= Masaki Takeuchi =

Japanese Muay Thai fighter

- Born: May 1, 1995 (age 31); Kōza District, Kanagawa, Japan
- Native name: 竹内将生
- Nationality: Japanese
- Height: 1.70 m (5 ft 7 in)
- Weight: 57.5 kg (127 lb; 9.05 st)
- Style: Karate, Muay Thai
- Stance: Orthodox
- Fighting out of: Yokohama, Japan
- Team: Eiwa Sports Gym
- Years active: 2012 - present

Kickboxing record
- Total: 46
- Wins: 26
- By knockout: 6
- Losses: 18
- By knockout: 7
- Draws: 2

Masaki Takeuchi (born 1 May 1995), is a Japanese Muay Thai fighter and kickboxer, currently fighting in the featherweight division of Krush.

Combat Press ranked him as a top ten super flyweight kickboxer in the world between July 2021 and June 2022, peaking at #8.

== Championships and accomplishments ==
- World Professional Muaythai Federation
  - 2013 WPMF Japan Bantamweight Champion
  - 2015 WPMF Japan Bantamweight Champion
- J-NETWORK
  - 2016 J-NETWORK Bantamweight Champion
- Martial Arts Japan Kickboxing Federation
  - 2016 MAJKF Super Bantamweight Champion
- Bigbang
  - 2019 Bigbang Featherweight Champion
- Battle of MuayThai
  - 2021 BOM Featherweight Champion

== Fight record ==
Kickboxing & Muay Thai record
28 Wins (7 (T)KO's), 18 Losses, 2 Draws
Date	Result	Opponent	Event	Location	Method	Round	Time
2024-07-27	Loss	(Japan) Takahito Niimi	Krush 163	Tokyo, Japan	TKO (Punches)	2	1:45
2024-02-24	Loss	(Japan) Hiroki	Krush 158	Tokyo, Japan	KO (Right hook)	2	2:03
2023-12-17	Win	(Japan) Yusuke	Krush 156	Tokyo, Japan	KO (Left hook)	3	1:28
2023-08-27	Win	(Japan) Kensuke	Krush 152	Tokyo, Japan	Decision (Unanimous)	3	3:00
2023-03-25	Loss	(Japan) Momotaro	Krush 147	Tokyo, Japan	Ext. R Decision (Split)	4	3:00
2022-07-30	Win	(Japan) Kazuma Kubo	Krush 139	Tokyo, Japan	Decision (Unanimous)	3	3:00
2022-04-30	Loss	(Japan) Riku Morisaka	Krush 136	Tokyo, Japan	Decision (Majority)	3	3:00
2022-01-23	Loss	(Japan) Ryoga Hirano	RISE 154	Tokyo, Japan	Decision (Unanimous)	3	3:00
2021-09-26	Win	(Japan) Takanobu Sano	Battle of MuayThai – ouroboros 2021 –	Tokyo, Japan	Ext. R Decision (Unanimous)	4	3:00
Wins the vacant BOM Featherweight title
2021-07-28	Loss	(Japan) Masahide Kudo	RISE 151	Tokyo, Japan	TKO (3 Knockdowns/Punches)	1	1:43
For the RISE Featherweight title
2021-01-30	Win	(Japan) Keisuke Monguchi	RISE 145	Tokyo, Japan	Decision (Unanimous)	3	3:00
2020-11-14	Win	(Japan) Shuto Miyazaki	RISE 143	Tokyo, Japan	Decision (Unanimous)	3	3:00
2020-02-09	Win	(Korea) Jae Jin Lee	The Battle Of Muay Thai Season 2 vol.7 Part 2	Yokohama, Japan	Decision (Majority)	3	3:00
2019-12-29	Win	(Japan) Yuki Miyazaki	Bigbang 37	Tokyo, Japan	Decision (Unanimous)	3	3:00
Wins the vacant Bigbang Featherweight title
2019-11-03	Win	(Japan) Kenichi Takeuchi	Bigbang Isehara 2019	Tokyo, Japan	Decision (Split)	3	3:00
2019-08-11	Loss	(Japan) Shota Oiwa	Shonan Fight Challenge	Shonan, Japan	Decision (Unanimous)	3	3:00
2019-06-07	Loss	(Japan) Daiki Toita	Bigbang 36	Tokyo, Japan	Decision (Unanimous)	3	3:00
2019-02-03	Loss	(Japan) Rasta	RISE 130	Tokyo, Japan	Decision (Unanimous)	3	3:00
2019-01-16	Win	(Japan) Yugo Kato	ROAD TO KNOCK OUT Vol. 3	Tokyo, Japan	TKO (Doctor Stoppage)	2	1:31
2018-12-09	Win	(Japan) Akihiko	The Battle of Muay Thai 20	Yokohama, Japan	Decision (Unanimous)	3	3:00
2018-10-21	Loss	(Japan) KOUMA	M-ONE 2018 FINAL	Tokyo, Japan	TKO (Doctor Stoppage)	2	1:56
For the vacant WPMF Japan Super Bantamweight title
2018-07-01	Win	(Japan) Taisei Umei	The Battle of Muay Thai 18	Yokohama, Japan	Decision (Unanimous)	3	3:00
2018-04-14	Loss	(Japan) Masahiko Suzuki	KNOCK OUT Sakura Burst	Kanagawa, Japan	TKO (3 Knockdowns)	2	1:14
2017-12-17	Win	(Japan) Shohei Mortishita	BOM 16 - The Battle Of Muay Thai 16 Part.2	Yokohama, Japan	Decision (Unanimous)	3	3:00
2017-08-06	Win	(Japan) Norihisa Isencho	BOM 15 - The Battle Of Muay Thai 15 -	Tokyo, Japan	KO (Left Hook)	3	3:00
2017-04-16	Win	(Japan) Daihachi Furuoka	SNKA TITANS NEOS 21	Tokyo, Japan	Decision (Unanimous)	3	3:00
2016-12-04	Win	(Japan) Ryo Takahashi	BOM 13 - The Battle Of Muay Thai 13 -	Yokohama, Japan	Decision (Majority)	3	3:00
2016-04-30	Win	(Japan) Takashi Ohno	MAJKF Festival of Martial Arts ～FIGHT FOR PEACE 7～	Tokyo, Japan	Decision (Majority)	3	3:00
Wins the vacant MAJKF Super Bantamweight title
2016-02-28	Win	(Japan) Tsuyoshi Ono	J-NETWORK - J-KICK 2016～Honor the fighting spirits～1st	Tokyo, Japan	Decision (Majority)	5	3:00
Wins J-NETWORK Bantamweight title
2015-09-19	Loss	(Japan) Takaaki Hayashi	GRACHAN 19×BOM IX.5	Tokyo, Japan	KO (Right Elbow)	3	0:44
For the WPMF World Bantamweight title.
2015-07-19	Loss	(United States) Hunter Vanhoose	The Battle Of Muay Thai IX -	Yokohama, Japan	Decision (Unanimous)	5	3:00
2015-06-21	Win	(Japan) Tsuyoshi Ono	J-NETWORK - J-FIGHT＆J-GIRLS 2015 3rd	Tokyo, Japan	Decision (Split)	3	3:00
2015-04-29	Win	(Japan) Tatsuya Hibata	The Battle of Muaythai VIII	Tokyo, Japan	TKO (Referee Stoppage)	4	3:00
Wins the vacant WPMF Japan Bantamweight title.
2014-08-10	Loss	(Japan) Takashi Ohno	MAJKF KICK GUTS 2014	Tokyo, Japan	KO (Flying Knee)	5	2:28
For the MAJKF Bantamweight title
2014-06-15	Loss	(Japan) Kunihiro	M-FIGHT SUK WEERASAKRECK VI	Tokyo, Japan	TKO (Right Hook)	3	1:38
2014-04-13	Win	(Thailand) Tinree Revival	M-FIGHT - The Battle Of Muay Thai IV -	Tokyo, Japan	Decision (Unanimous)	5	3:00
2014-02-23	Loss	(Japan) Kenta	J-NETWORK - J-FIGHT in SHINJUKU ～vol.36～	Tokyo, Japan	Decision (Unanimous)	3	3:00
2013-12-01	Win	(Japan) Yosuke Innami	M-FIGHT The Battle of Muaythai III	Yokohama, Japan	TKO (Doctor Stoppage)	3	0:27
Wins the vacant WPMF Japan Bantamweight title.
2013-10-20	Win	(Japan) Kyohei Chigira	J-NETWORK - J-FIGHT in SHINJUKU ～vol.33～NIGHT	Tokyo, Japan	Decision (Unanimous)	3	3:00
2013-08-12	Loss	(Thailand)	Queen's Cup	Bangkok, Thailand	Decision	5	3:00
2013-07-21	Loss	(Japan) Takuma Ito	Muay Lok 2013 2nd	Tokyo, Japan	Decision (Unanimous)	3	3:00
2013-06-09	Win	(Japan) David Chibana	TNK1 feat.REBELS	Tokyo, Japan	Decision (Unanimous)	3	3:00
2013-04-28	Win	(Japan) Yosuke Innami	Muay Lok 2013 1st	Tokyo, Japan	Decision (Majority)	3	3:00
2013-01-27	Loss	(Japan) Taisuke Degai	REBELS 14	Tokyo, Japan	Decision (Unanimous)	3	3:00
2012-12-02	Draw	(Japan) Ryuji Horio	Bigbang 11	Tokyo, Japan	Decision (Split)	3	3:00
2012-10-28	Draw	(Japan) Masayoshi Kunimoto	REBELS 13	Tokyo, Japan	Decision (Majority)	3	3:00
2012-09-09	Win	(Japan) Shohei Suzuki	M-1 Muay Thai Challenge Suk Yod Muaythai vol.3 Part 1	Tokyo, Japan	TKO	2	2:51
Wins the M-1 NEXT HEROES Cup.
2012-06-24	Win	(Japan) Ryosuke Makino	M-1 Muay Thai Challenge Suk Yod Muaythai vol.2 Part 1	Tokyo, Japan	Decision (Split)	3	3:00
2012-03-04	Win	(Japan) Shunking	Shuken V	Tokyo, Japan	KO (Right Cross)	1	2:35
Legend: Win Loss Draw/No contest Notes

Amateur Kickboxing
Date	Result	Opponent	Event	Location	Method	Round	Time
2011-08-27	Loss	(Japan) Shuto Miyazaki	K-1 Koshien East Japan A-Block Tournament, Final	Tokyo, Japan	Decision (Majority)	1	
2011-08-27	Win	(Japan) Joichiro Shimo	K-1 Koshien East Japan A-Block Tournament, Semi Finals	Tokyo, Japan	TKO	1	
2011-08-27	Win	(Japan) Atsushi Yamada	K-1 Koshien East Japan A-Block Tournament, Quarter Finals	Tokyo, Japan	Decision (Split)	1	
2011-08-27	Win	(Japan) Takumi Jitsukawa	K-1 Koshien East Japan A-Block Tournament, 1/8 Finals	Tokyo, Japan	TKO		
Legend: Win Loss Draw/No contest Notes

== See also ==
- List of male kickboxers
