= Taisei Umei =

Japanese kickboxer (born 1998)

- Born: 梅井泰成; April 27, 1998 (age 28); Kyoto, Kyoto Prefecture, Japan
- Nickname: Gluttonous Demon
- Height: 167 cm (5 ft 6 in)
- Weight: 57.5 kg (127 lb; 9.05 st)
- Stance: Southpaw
- Fighting out of: Chiba, Japan
- Team: Noguchi Gym (2017-2019); Teppen Gym (2020-2022); Mouton (2022-present)
- Years active: 2017-present

Kickboxing record
- Total: 30
- Wins: 16
- By knockout: 3
- Losses: 13
- By knockout: 1
- No contests: 1

Taisei Umei (Japanese: 梅井泰成, Umei Taisei; born April 27, 1998) is a Japanese professional kickboxer, currently competing in the featherweight division of RISE, where he is the former RISE featherweight champion.

== Kickboxing career ==
=== Early career ===
Umei faced Kuro Dash at DEEP☆KICK 35 on April 1, 2018. He won the fight by unanimous decision, with all three judges scoring the fight 30–28 in his favor. Umei next faced HΛL at NJKF 2018 west 3rd on May 27, 2018. He lost the fight by majority decision. After suffering his second professional loss, Umei was booked to face Masaki Takeuchi at The Battle Of Muay Thai 18 on July 1, 2018. He lost the fight by unanimous decision, with all three judges awarding Takeuchi a 30–29 scorecard. Umei's losing streak extended to three straight fights after suffering a first-round knockout loss, the first stoppage loss of his career, to Yosuke at DEEP☆KICK 37 on September 23, 2018.

Umei snapped his three-fight losing streak at The Battle Of Muay Thai 19 on October 14, 2018, as he stopped Kanta Suzuki in the second round. It was the first stoppage victory of his professional career. Umei faced Toranosuke at NJKF 2018 West 4th on December 16, 2018, in his sixth and final fight of the year. He won the fight by unanimous decision, with scores of 30–27, 30–27 and 30–28.

Umei was booked to face Yuichi at NJKF 2019 West 1st on February 24, 2019. He won the fight by unanimous decision, with scores of 30–28, 30–28 and 30–29. Umei next faced Seung Hyun Lee at DEEP☆KICK 39 on April 7, 2019. He won the fight by unanimous decision. After winning four fights in a row, Umei would go on to lose his next three fights. He first lost a decision to Thongsiam Kiatsongrit at DUEL 18 on May 19, 2019, after which he lost by decision to Rikiya at DEEP☆KICK 40, with his third loss being a unanimous decision loss to Seiki Ueyama at Rizin 19 - Osaka on October 12, 2019.

=== RISE ===
==== Early RISE career ====
Umei made his promotional debut with RISE against Ryoga Hirano at RISE 143 on November 14, 2020, in what was his first fight after transferring to TEAM TEPPEN. He won the fight by unanimous decision, with all three judges scoring the bout 30–29 in his favor.

Umei, at the time the #8 ranked RISE featherweight contender, was scheduled to face Naoki Yamada at RISE 147 on March 28, 2021. He won the fight by unanimous decision, with scores of 30–29, 30–28 and 30–28.

Umei was booked to face Kensei Yamakawa at RISE 151 on July 28, 2021. He won the fight by a third-round technical knockout, after the ringside physician advised the referee to stop the fight. It was his first stoppage victory since October 14, 2018.

Umei faced the sixth ranked RISE featherweight contender Shuto Miyazaki at Rise World Series 2021 Osaka 2 on November 14, 2021. He won the fight by a first-round knockout, flooring Miyazaki with a head kick at the 2:07 minute mark of the opening round.

==== RISE featherweight champion ====
His undefeated record with RISE earned Umei the opportunity to fight Ryoga Hirano for the vacant RISE Featherweight Championship at RISE 156 on March 27, 2022. The bout was a rematch of their November 14, 2020, meeting which Umei won by unanimous decision. Umei was more successful in the rematch as well, as he won the fight by majority decision. Two judges scored the fight 48–47 and 49–48 for him, while the third judge scored the fight an even 49–49 draw.

Umei made his first title defense against the third ranked RISE featherweight contender Keisuke Monguchi at RISE 161 on August 28, 2022. Umei left TEPPEN prior to the bout taking place, where he had trained since signing with RISE, and began training at Mouton gym. Umei lost the fight by unanimous decision, with two judges scoring the bout 50–46 for his opponent, while the third judge scored all five rounds for Monguchi.

==== Later featherweight career ====
Umei faced Kaito Sakaguchi at RISE 165: RISE 20th Memorial event on February 23, 2023. He lost the fight by majority decision, with scores of 30–29, 30–29 and 29–29.

Umei faced Haruto Yasumoto at RISE 176 on February 23, 2024. He lost the fight by majority decision, with scores of 30–28, 30–29 and 29–29.

Umei faced Kakeru at RISE 179 on June 30, 2024. He won the fight by unanimous decision.

Umei faced Yuta Kunieda at RISE WORLD SERIES 2024 YOKOHAMA on September 8, 2024. He lost the fight by unanimous decision.

Umei faced Shoa Arii at RISE 187 on April 19, 2025. He won the fight by unanimous decision.

Umei faced the Ryunosuke Omori at RISE 196 on February 23, 2026.

== Championships and accomplishments ==
- RISE
  - 2022 RISE Featherweight Championship

== Fight record ==
Kickboxing record
16 Wins (3 (T)KO's), 13 Losses, 0 Draws, 1 No Contests
Date	Result	Opponent	Event	Location	Method	Round	Time
2026-07-12	Loss	(Japan) Akito Nakashima	RISE 200	Tokyo, Japan	Decision (Unanimous)	3	3:00
2026-02-23	Loss	(Japan) Ryunosuke Omori	RISE 196	Tokyo, Japan	Ext.R Decision (Unanimous)	4	3:00
2025-10-19	Win	(Japan) Kosei Yoshida	RISE 192	Tokyo, Japan	Tech. Decision (Unanimous)	2	2:07
2025-04-19	Win	(Japan) Shoa Arii	RISE 187	Tokyo, Japan	Decision (Unanimous)	3	3:00
2024-09-08	Loss	(Japan) Yuta Kunieda	RISE WORLD SERIES 2024 YOKOHAMA	Yokohama, Japan	Decision (Unanimous)	3	3:00
2024-06-30	Win	(Japan) Kakeru	RISE 179	Tokyo, Japan	Decision (Unanimous)	3	3:00
2024-02-23	Loss	(Japan) Haruto Yasumoto	RISE 176	Tokyo, Japan	Decision (Majority)	3	3:00
2023-10-29	NC	(Thailand) Warm Onelink	RISE 172	Tokyo, Japan	No Contest (low blow)	1	
2023-02-23	Loss	(Japan) Kaito Sakaguchi	RISE 165: RISE 20th Memorial event	Tokyo, Japan	Decision (Majority)	3	3:00
2022-08-28	Loss	(Japan) Keisuke Monguchi	RISE 161	Tokyo, Japan	Decision (Unanimous)	5	3:00
Loses the RISE Featherweight Championship.
2022-03-27	Win	(Japan) Ryoga Hirano	RISE 156	Tokyo, Japan	Decision (Majority)	5	3:00
Won the vacant RISE Featherweight Championship.
2021-11-14	Win	(Japan) Shuto Miyazaki	Rise World Series 2021 Osaka 2	Osaka, Japan	KO (Left high kick)	1	2:07
2021-07-28	Win	(Japan) Kensei Yamakawa	RISE 151	Tokyo, Japan	TKO (Doctor stoppage)	2	0:07
2021-03-28	Win	(Japan) Naoki Yamada	RISE 147	Tokyo, Japan	Decision (Unanimous)	3	3:00
2020-11-14	Win	(Japan) Ryoga Hirano	RISE 143	Tokyo, Japan	Decision (Unanimous)	3	3:00
2019-10-12	Loss	(Japan) Seiki Ueyama	Rizin 19 - Osaka	Osaka, Japan	Decision (Unanimous)	3	3:00
2019-09-15	Loss	(Japan) Rikiya	DEEP☆KICK 40	Osaka, Japan	Decision (Unanimous)	3	3:00
2019-05-19	Loss	(Thailand) Thongsiam Kiatsongrit	DUEL 18	Kanagawa, Japan	Decision (Unanimous)	3	3:00
2019-04-07	Win	(South Korea) Seung Hyun Lee	DEEP☆KICK 39	Osaka, Japan	Decision (Unanimous)	3	3:00
2019-02-24	Win	(Japan) Yuichi	NJKF 2019 West 1st	Osaka, Japan	Decision (Unanimous)	3	3:00
2018-12-16	Win	(Japan) Toranosuke	NJKF 2018 West 4th	Osaka, Japan	Decision (Unanimous)	3	3:00
2018-10-14	Win	(Japan) Kanta Suzuki	The Battle Of Muay Thai 19	Tokyo, Japan	TKO (Referee stoppage)	2	1:02
2018-09-23	Loss	(Japan) Yosuke	DEEP☆KICK 37	Osaka, Japan	KO (Right straight)	1	3:00
2018-07-01	Loss	(Japan) Masaki Takeuchi	The Battle Of Muay Thai 18	Kanagawa, Japan	Decision (Unanimous)	3	3:00
2018-05-27	Loss	(Japan) HΛL	NJKF 2018 west 3rd	Osaka, Japan	Decision (Majority)	3	3:00
2018-04-01	Win	(Japan) Kuro Dash	DEEP☆KICK 35	Osaka, Japan	Decision (Unanimous)	3	3:00
2018-02-25	Loss	(Japan) Rikiya	Hoost Cup Kings Kyoto 4	Kyoto, Japan	Decision (Unanimous)	3	3:00
2018-01-14	Win	(Japan) Takeshi Oda	NJKF 2018 West 1st	Osaka, Japan	Decision (Unanimous)	3	3:00
2017-12-17	Win	(Japan) Fumiya	DEEP☆KICK 34	Osaka, Japan	Decision (Unanimous)	3	3:00
2017-10-07	Win	(Thailand) Faahsang	MUAYTHAI HIGHSPEED	Osaka, Japan	Tech. Decision (Unainmous)	3	0:20
Legend: Win Loss Draw/No contest Notes

== See also ==
- List of male kickboxers
