= Taiki Sawatani =

Japanese kickboxer (born 1999)

- Born: June 11, 1999 (age 27); Ishikawa Prefecture, Japan
- Native name: 澤谷大樹
- Nationality: Japanese
- Height: 1.69 m (5 ft 6 1/2 in)
- Weight: 58 kg (128 lb; 9.1 st)
- Style: Karate, Kickboxing
- Stance: Southpaw
- Fighting out of: Tokyo, Japan
- Team: HAWK GYM
- Years active: 2017 - present

Kickboxing record
- Total: 27
- Wins: 18
- By knockout: 1
- Losses: 9
- By knockout: 0
- Draws: 0
- No contests: 0

Taiki Sawatani (Japanese: 澤谷大樹, Sawatani Taiki; born June 11, 1999) is a Japanese kickboxer, currently competing in the super featherweight division of RISE.

As of May 2022 he was the #10 ranked Super Flyweight in the world by Combat Press.

== Kickboxing career ==
=== Featherweight ===
Sawatani's martial art experience started with full contact karate, after competing in numerous junior tournaments he switched to amateur kickboxing which led him to participate to the 2016 Japan Cup as a Shin Karate representant. He won the tournament and the event MVP award which earned him an opportunity to turn professional with the RISE organization.

Sawatani made his professional on March 5, 2017, at RISE 116 against Maiki Flyskygym. He lost the fight by unanimous decision. He traded wins and losses in his next bouts, winning by majority decision against Takuya Taira at RISE 117 and losing by unanimous decision to Yuki Kawate at RISE 118. On February 4, 2018, Sawatani faced YA-MAN at RISE 122. He lost the fight by split decision.

On August 5, 2018, Sawatani was selected to participate to the 2018 RISE Rookies Cup in the featherweight division. He defeated Silencer Higuchi by unanimous decision in a fight serving as the semifinal bout. In the final he rematched YA-MAN and defeated him by unanimous decision to win the Cup.

On February 3, 2019, Sawatani faced Teppei Tsuda at RISE 130. He won the fight by unanimous decision.

On January 13, 2020, Sawatani faced Shuto Miyazaki at RISE 136. He won the fight by majority decision.

Sawatani faced Keisuke Monguchi at RISE 143 on November 14, 2020. He lost the fight by unanimous decision, with scores of 29–28, 30–28 and 30–28.

On April 11, 2021, Sawatani entered a tournament for the vacant DEEP KICK Super Featherweight title at DEEP KICK 51. He faced Kaito in the semi-final, the fight was ruled a majority draw after the first three rounds, with two judges scoring it as a 29–29 draw, while the third judge scored it 29–28 for Sawatani. Sawatani was awarded a majority decision, after an extension round was fought. The final of the tournament happened on July 4, 2021, at DEEP KICK 54 where Sawatani defeated Taisei Iwagoe by split decision to capture the vacant title.

On December 19, 2021, Sawatani faced Tasuto at Professional Shooto 2021 Vol.8 in Osaka. He lost the fight by unanimous decision.

On February 23, 2022, Sawatani made his first appearance on a Rizin show at Rizin Trigger 2 where he defeated Kota Nakgawa by unanimous decision.

On April 24, 2022, Sawatani faced Daiki Toita at RISE 157. He won the fight by unanimous decision.

Sawatani was scheduled to defend his DEEP KICK -60 kg title at DEEP KICK 62 on June 12, 2022, against Koki Oomae. He won the fight by unanimous decision.

Sawatani faced Ryoga Hirano at RISE 163 on December 10, 2022. He lost the fight by unanimous decision, with all three judges scoring the bout 29–28 for Hirano. Sawatani was knocked down with a right hook early in the first round.

=== Super featherweight ===
Sawatani faced the #4 ranked RISE super featherweight contender Masaaki Ono at RISE 167 on April 21, 2023. He won the fight by unanimous decision, after an extra fourth round was contested.

Sawatani faced Haruto Yasumoto at RISE 173 on November 18, 2023. He lost the fight by unanimous decision, with scores of 30–28, 30–29 and 30–29.

== Championships and accomplishments ==
=== Kickboxing ===
Professional

- RISE
  - 2018 RISE Rookies Cup Featherweight Winner
- DEEP KICK
  - 2021 DEEP KICK -60 kg Champion
- Shooto
  - 2022 Shooto Cage Kick Championship -57.5 kg Winner

Amateur

- DEEP KICK
  - 2014 NEXT LEVEL Chushikoku Junior -60 kg Champion (1 defense)
- Shin Karate
  - 2016 Dageki Kakutougi Japan Cup -60 kg Winner & Event MVP

=== Karate ===
- Japan Karate Judge Organization
  - 2011 JKJO Full Contact All Japan Junior -40 kg Winner
  - 2013 JKJO Full Contact All Japan Jr -65 kg Runner-up
  - 2014 JKJO Full Contact All Japan Jr -65 kg Winner
- Ashiharakaikan Karate
  - 2012 Ashiharakaikan Japan Cup Jr. Championship 43 kg Runner-up
- Shin Karate
  - 2013 Super Karate All Japan Middle School Heavyweight Winner
  - 2011 Shin Karate K-4 GAORA Cup Winner
  - 2014 Shin Karate All Japan K-3 Grand Prix Middle School -60 kg Winner
  - 2015 Shin Karate Tokyo K-2 Tournament Lightweight Winner
  - 2016 Shin Karate Tokyo K-2 Tournament Lightweight Winner

== Kickboxing record ==
Professional Kickboxing record
18 Wins (1 (T)KOs), 10 Losses, 0 Draw
Date	Result	Opponent	Event	Location	Method	Round	Time
2024-08-04	Loss	(Japan) Yuki Hamada	DEEP☆KICK ISHIKAWA	Kanazawa, Japan	KO (Body kick)	2	1:52
Loses the DEEP KICK -60kg title.
2024-03-30	Loss	(Japan) King Ryuzo	DEEP☆KICK 69	Osaka, Japan	Decision (Unanimous)	3	3:00
2023-11-18	Loss	(Japan) Haruto Yasumoto	RISE 173	Tokyo, Japan	Decision (Unanimous)	3	3:00
2023-06-18	Win	(Japan) Kouki Ueno	DEEP KICK 66	Osaka, Japan	Decision (Unanimous)	3	3:00
Defends the DEEP KICK -60kg title.
2023-04-21	Win	(Japan) Masaaki Ono	RISE 167	Tokyo, Japan	Ext.R Decision (Unanimous)	4	3:00
2023-03-05	Loss	(Japan) Takuya Taira	HOOST CUP KINGS KYOTO 11, Championship Tournament Final	Kyoto, Japan	Decision (Majority)	3	3:00
For the HOOST CUP Japan Lightweight title.
2023-03-05	Win	(Japan) Hiroki Naruo	HOOST CUP KINGS KYOTO 11, Championship Tournament Semi-final	Kyoto, Japan	Decision (Majority)	3	3:00
2022-12-10	Loss	(Japan) Ryoga Hirano	RISE 163	Tokyo, Japan	Decision (Unanimous)	3	3:00
2022-07-03	Win	(Japan) Kazuhiro Matsuyama	SHOOTO 2022 Vol.4 - Cage Kick Championship, Final	Osaka, Japan	TKO (Knee)	2	2:33
Wins 2022 Shooto Cage Kick Championship -57.5kg title.
2022-07-03	Win	(Japan) Kakeru	SHOOTO 2022 Vol.4 - Cage Kick Championship, Semi-finals	Osaka, Japan	Decision (Unanimous)	3	3:00
2022-07-03	Win	(Japan) Taiki Matsui	SHOOTO 2022 Vol.4 - Cage Kick Championship, Quarter-finals	Osaka, Japan	Decision (Majority)	3	3:00
2022-06-12	Win	(Japan) Koki Oomae	DEEP KICK 62	Osaka, Japan	Decision (Unanimous)	3	3:00
Defends DEEP KICK -60kg title.
2022-04-24	Win	(Japan) Daiki Toita	RISE 157	Tokyo, Japan	Decision (Unanimous)	3	3:00
2022-02-23	Win	(Japan) Kota Nakagawa	Rizin Trigger 2	Fukuroi, Japan	Decision (Unanimous)	3	3:00
2021-12-19	Loss	(Japan) Tatsuto	Professional Shooto 2021 Vol.8	Osaka, Japan	Decision (Unanimous)	3	3:00
2021-07-04	Win	(Japan) Taisei Iwagoe	DEEP☆KICK 54 - Championship Tournament Final	Osaka, Japan	Decision (Split)	3	3:00
Wins the vacant DEEP KICK -60kg title.
2021-04-11	Win	(Japan) Kaito	DEEP☆KICK 51 - Championship Tournament Semi-final	Osaka, Japan	Ext.R Decision (Split)	4	3:00
2020-11-14	Loss	(Japan) Keisuke Monguchi	RISE 143	Tokyo, Japan	Decision (Unanimous)	3	3:00
2020-01-13	Win	(Japan) Shuto Miyazaki	RISE 136	Tokyo, Japan	Decision (Majority)	3	3:00
2019-04-29	Win	(Japan) Kensei Yamakawa	RISE EVOL.3	Tokyo, Japan	Decision (Unanimous)	3	3:00
2019-02-03	Win	(Japan) Teppei Tsuda	RISE 130	Tokyo, Japan	Decision (Unanimous)	3	3:00
2018-11-02	Win	(Japan) YA-MAN	RISE 128 - Featherweight Rookies Cup Final	Tokyo, Japan	Decision (Unanimous)	3	3:00
Wins RISE Rookies Cup Featherweight title.
2018-08-05	Win	(Japan) Silencer Higuchi	RISE ZERO - Featherweight Rookies Cup Semi-final	Tokyo, Japan	Decision (Unanimous)	3	3:00
2018-06-03	Win	(Japan) Aito Suenaga	RISE ZERO	Tokyo, Japan	Decision (Unanimous)	3	3:00
2018-02-04	Loss	(Japan) YA-MAN	RISE 122	Tokyo, Japan	Decision (Split)	3	3:00
2017-07-17	Loss	(Japan) Yuki Kawate	RISE 118	Tokyo, Japan	Decision (Unanimous)	3	3:00
2017-05-20	Win	(Japan) Takuya Taira	RISE 117	Tokyo, Japan	Decision (Majority)	3	3:00
2017-03-05	Loss	(Japan) Maiki Flyskygym	RISE 116	Tokyo, Japan	Decision (Unanimous)	3	3:00
Legend: Win Loss Draw/No contest Notes

Amateur Kickboxing record
Date	Result	Opponent	Event	Location	Method	Round	Time
2016-10-22	Win	(Japan) Keito Obinata	Amateur Dageki Kakutougi Japan Cup 2016, Final	Tokyo, Japan	Decision	2	2:00
Wins 2016 Japan Cup -60kg title.
2016-10-22	Win	(Japan)	Amateur Dageki Kakutougi Japan Cup 2016, Semi-final	Tokyo, Japan			
2016-01-31	Win	(Japan) Yuta Masuda	NEXT☆LEVEL Chushikoku 19	Okayama, Japan	KO	2	
2015-08-15	Loss	(Japan) Kensei Kondo	K-1 Koshien 2015 Tournament, Semi-final	Tokyo, Japan	Decision (Majority)	1	2:00
2015-08-15	Win	(Japan) Ryoma Kobayashi	K-1 Koshien 2015 Tournament, Quarter-final	Tokyo, Japan	Ext.R Decision (Majority)	1	2:00
2015-08-15	Win	(Japan) Kenichi Takeuchi	K-1 Koshien 2015 Tournament, First Round	Tokyo, Japan	Decision (Split)	1	2:00
2015-07-12	Draw	(Japan) Yudai Kitayama	HOOST CUP Spirit 6	Kyoto, Japan	Decision		
2014-08-10	Win	(Japan) Takeshi Ikeda	NJKF x NEXT LEVEL	Okayama, Japan	Decision	2	2:00
Defends NEXT LEVEL Chushikoku Junior -60kg title.
2014-04-27	Win	(Japan) Ryoga Hirano	NEXT☆LEVEL Chushikoku 13	Kurashiki, Japan	Decision (Unanimous)	2	2:00
Wins NEXT LEVEL Chushikoku Junior -60kg title.
2014-03-16	Win	(Japan) Yusuke Yamada	NEXT☆LEVEL Kansai 13	Sakai, Japan	Decision (Majority)	2	2:00
2013-10-20	Draw	(Japan) Renta Nishioka	NEXT LEVEL Kansai 10	Osaka, Japan	Decision (Majority)	2	2:00
Legend: Win Loss Draw/No contest Notes

== See also ==
- List of male kickboxers
