= Kaito Sakaguchi =

Japanese kickboxer

Kaito
- Born: Kaito Sakaguchi; August 28, 2001 (age 25); Osaka, Japan
- Native name: 坂口魁斗
- Height: 175 cm (5 ft 9 in)
- Weight: 58.0 kg (127.9 lb; 9.13 st)
- Style: Karate, Shoot boxing
- Stance: Orthodox
- Fighting out of: Osaka, Japan
- Team: SB Risshikaikan (2008-present)
- Years active: 2018-present

Kickboxing record
- Total: 26
- Wins: 19
- By knockout: 2
- Losses: 6
- By knockout: 2
- Draws: 1

Kaito Sakaguchi (坂口魁斗, born 28 August 2001), popularly known as Kaito (魁斗), is a Japanese kickboxer, currently competing in the super featherweight division of RISE.

As of August 2021 he was the #9 ranked Super Flyweight kickboxer in the world by Combat Press.

== Kickboxing career ==
=== Shootboxing ===
Kaito made his professional debut against Yu Jin at Shoot Boxing OSAKA 2018 ALPINISME vol.1 on March 18, 2018. He won the fight by unanimous decision, with scores of 30–27, 30–28 and 30–29.

Kaito was scheduled to face Satoru Shimizu at Shoot Boxing 2018 act.3 on June 10, 2018. He won the fight by unanimous decision, with scores of 30–28, 30–28 and 30–29.

Kaito was scheduled to face Bullseye Ryuta at Shoot Boxing 2018 Young Caesar Cup Central #23 on September 23, 2018. He won the fight by a third-round technical knockout.

Kaito was scheduled to face Shota Tezuka at Shoot Boxing S-Cup World Tournament 2018 on November 18, 2018. He won the fight by unanimous decision, with scores of 30–28, 30–27 and 30–27.

Kaito was scheduled to face Kazuya Ueda at Shoot Boxing 2018 Young Caesar Cup act.5 on December 16, 2018, in his fifth and final fight of 2018. He won the fight by unanimous decision, with all three judges scoring the bout 30–29 in his favor.

Kaito was scheduled to fight Genki at Shoot Boxing Osaka 2019 Alpinisme vol.1 on August 10, 2019. He won the fight by unanimous decision, with two judges awarding him a 30–29 scorecard, while the third judge scored the fight 30–28 in his favor.

Kaito was scheduled to face the #4 ranked featherweight contender Shota Tezuka at Shoot Boxing 2019 act.4 on September 28, 2019. He won the fight by unanimous decision, with scores of 29–28, 30–28 and 30–27.

Kaito was scheduled to face the #10 ranked featherweight contender TSUTOMU at Shoot Boxing Hanayashiki Extreme.3 on October 27, 2019. He won the fight by unanimous decision, with scores of 30–28, 30–28 and 30–27.

Kaito was next scheduled to fight the #1 ranked Shootboxing featherweight contender Yuki Kasahara at Shoot Boxing 2020 act.1 on February 15, 2020. The fight was ruled a majority draw after the first three rounds, with two of the judges seeing the fight as a draw (30–30 and 29–29), while the third judge scored the fight 30–29 for Kasahara. Accordingly, an extension round was fought and was once again ruled a majority draw, with one judge scoring the round for Kasahara. Kasahara was awarded a majority decision, after a second extension round was fought.

=== Move up to super featherweight ===
Following his first professional loss, Kaito moved up to super featherweight, a 2.5 kg increase in weight from his previous fights. He was scheduled to face Shoki Kaneda for the RKS Super Featherweight title at RKS GOLD RUSH VII on November 29, 2020. Kaito won the fight by majority decision.

Kaito was next scheduled to face Takuya Taira, in a 58.5 kg bout, at HOOST CUP KINGS KYOTO 7 on March 7, 2021. He won the fight by unanimous decision, with scores of 29–28, 30–27 and 30–27.

Kaito took part in the DEEP KICK super featherweight tournament held at DEEP☆KICK 51 on April 11, 2021, and was scheduled to face Taiki Sawatani in the semifinals. The fight was ruled a majority draw after the first three rounds, with two judges scoring it as a 29–29 draw, while the third judge scored it 29–28 for Sawatani. Sawatani was awarded a majority decision, after an extension round was fought.

=== RISE ===
Kaito was scheduled to make his promotional debut with RISE against Keisuke Monguchi at Rise World Series 2021 on July 18, 2021. He won the fight by split decision, with scores of 30–29, 30–29 and 29–30.

Kaito was scheduled to challenge Takuya Taira for the HOOST CUP Japan Featherweight title at HOOST CUP KINGS KYOTO 8 on October 17, 2021. He won the fight by unanimous decision after five rounds.

Sakaguchi faced Kyo Kawakami for the vacant Shoot Boxing Japan Featherweight title at Shoot Boxing 2022 act.2 on April 10, 2022. He lost the fight by majority decision, after an extra round was contested.

Sakaguchi faced the former RISE Featherweight champion Taisei Umei at RISE 165: RISE 20th Memorial event on February 23, 2023. He won the fight by majority decision, with two scorecards of 30–29 and one even scorecard of 29–29.

Sakaguchi was expected to face the former two-weight REBELS champion Haruto Yasumoto at RISE World Series 2023 Osaka on July 2, 2023. Yasumoto withdrew from the fight on June 1, after being hospitalized with compartment syndrome he sustained in a prior fight. The fight was rescheduled for August 26, 2023, and took place at RISE World Series 2023 - 2nd Round. Sakaguchi won the fight by unanimous decision, with scores of 29–27, 29–28 and 29–28.

Sakaguchi challenged the RISE Featherweight champion Keisuke Monguchi at RISE 172 on October 29, 2023. He lost the fight by unanimous decision, with scores of 50–47, 49–47 and 49–47.

Sakaguchi faced Ryoga Hirano at Shoot Boxing 2024 act.4 on August 17, 2024. He won the fight by unanimous decision.

== Titles and accomplishments ==
Professional

- Real Kakutou Spirits
  - 2020 RKS Super Featherweight Champion
- HOOST CUP
  - 2021 Hoost Cup Japan Featherweight Champion

Amateur

- All Japan Glove Karate Federation
  - 2008 Glove Karate Federation All Japan Elementary School Champion
  - 2012 Glove Karate Federation All Japan Elementary School Champion
  - 2013 Glove Karate Federation All Japan Elementary School Champion
  - 2014 Glove Karate Federation All Japan middle school Runner-up
  - 2015 Glove Karate Federation All Japan middle school Runner-up
  - 2017 Glove Karate Federation All Japan -60 kg Champion
- DEEP KICK
  - 2013 TOP RUN -40 kg Champion
  - 2014 All Japan Jr Kick -40 kg Runner-up
- Shootboxing
  - 2013 Shoot Boxing All Japan Junior -40 kg Champion
  - 2015 Shoot Boxing All Kansai Junior -50 kg Champion
  - 2016 Shoot Boxing All Japan -55 kg Champion
  - 2017 Shoot Boxing All Japan -60 kg Champion

== Fight record ==
Kickboxing record
19 Wins (2 (T)KO's), 6 Losses, 1 Draw, 0 No Contest
Date	Result	Opponent	Event	Location	Method	Round	Time
2026-04-11	Loss	(Japan) Kotaro Yamada	SHOOT BOXING 2026 act.2	Tokyo, Japan	TKO (Referee stoppage)	3	0:50
2026-02-14	Win	(Japan) Ryota Naito	SHOOT BOXING 2026 act.1	Tokyo, Japan	Decision (Majority)	3	3:00
2025-11-24	Win	(Algeria) Soheib Bentebiche	SHOOT BOXING 40th Anniversary - S-Cup reserve fight	Tokyo, Japan	TKO (leg injury)	1	1:41
2025-06-22	Loss	(Japan) Koyata Yamada	SHOOT BOXING 2025 act.3	Tokyo, Japan	KO (Right cross)	1	3:00
2025-04-12	Win	(Greece) Angelos Giakoumis	SHOOT BOXING 2025 act.2	Tokyo, Japan	Decision (Unanimous)	3	3:00
2024-08-17	Win	(Japan) Ryoga Hirano	Shoot Boxing 2024 act.4	Tokyo, Japan	Decision (Unanimous)	3	3:00
2024-06-28	Win	(China) Lan Shanteng	ONE Friday Fights 68	Bangkok, Thailand	Decision (Unanimous)	3	3:00
2024-03-10	Draw	(Japan) Takahito Niimi	HOOST CUP KINGS KYOTO 13	Kyoto, Japan	Ext.R Decision (Majority)	4	3:00
2023-10-29	Loss	(Japan) Keisuke Monguchi	RISE 172	Tokyo, Japan	Decision (Unanimous)	5	3:00
For the RISE Featherweight Championship.
2023-08-26	Win	(Japan) Haruto Yasumoto	RISE World Series 2023 - 2nd Round	Tokyo, Japan	Decision (Unanimous)	3	3:00
2023-02-23	Win	(Japan) Taisei Umei	RISE 165: RISE 20th Memorial event	Tokyo, Japan	Decision (Majority)	3	3:00
2022-04-10	Loss	(Japan) Kyo Kawakami	Shoot Boxing 2022 act.2	Tokyo, Japan	Ext.R Decision (Majority)	6	3:00
For the vacant Shoot Boxing Japan Featherweight title.
2021-10-17	Win	(Japan) Takuya Taira	HOOST CUP KINGS KYOTO 8	Kyoto, Japan	Decision (Unanimous)	5	3:00
Wins the HOOST CUP Japan Featherweight title.
2021-07-18	Win	(Japan) Keisuke Monguchi	RISE WORLD SERIES 2021 Osaka	Osaka, Japan	Decision (Split)	3	3:00
2021-04-11	Loss	(Japan) Taiki Sawatani	DEEP☆KICK 51, -60 kg Championship Tournament Semi Final	Osaka, Japan	Ext.R Decision (Split)	4	3:00
2021-03-07	Win	(Japan) Takuya Taira	HOOST CUP KINGS KYOTO 7	Kyoto, Japan	Decision (Unanimous)	3	3:00
2020-11-29	Win	(Japan) Shoki Kaneda	RKS GOLD RUSH VII	Osaka, Japan	Decision (Majority)	3	3:00
Wins the RKS Super Featherweight title.
2020-02-15	Loss	(Japan) Yuki Kasahara	Shoot Boxing 2020 act.1	Tokyo, Japan	2nd Ext.R Decision (Majority)	5	3:00
2019-10-27	Win	(Japan) TSUTOMU	Shoot Boxing Hanayashiki Extreme.3	Tokyo, Japan	Decision (Unanimous)	3	3:00
2019-09-28	Win	(Japan) Shota Tezuka	Shoot Boxing 2019 act.4	Tokyo, Japan	Decision (Unanimous)	3	3:00
2019-08-10	Win	(Japan) Genki	Shoot Boxing Osaka 2019 Alpinisme vol.1	Osaka, Japan	Decision (Unanimous)	3	3:00
2018-12-16	Win	(Japan) Kazuya Ueda	Shoot Boxing 2018 Young Caesar Cup act.5	Tokyo, Japan	Decision (Unanimous)	3	3:00
2018-11-18	Win	(Japan) Shota Tezuka	Shoot Boxing S-Cup World Tournament 2018	Tokyo, Japan	Decision (Unanimous)	3	3:00
2018-09-23	Win	(Japan) Bullseye Ryuta	Shoot Boxing 2018 Young Caesar Cup Central #23	Aichi, Japan	TKO (Corner Stoppage)	3	1:07
2018-06-10	Win	(Japan) Satoru Shimizu	Shoot Boxing 2018 act.3	Tokyo, Japan	Decision (Unanimous)	3	2:00
2018-03-18	Win	(Korea) Yu Jin	Shoot Boxing OSAKA 2018 ALPINISME vol.1	Osaka, Japan	Decision (Unanimous)	3	2:00
Legend: Win Loss Draw/No contest Notes

=== Amateur record ===
Amateur Kickboxing Record
Date	Result	Opponent	Event	Location	Method	Round	Time
2017-12-17	Win	(Japan) Shota Tezuka	All Japan Amateur Shoot Boxing	Tokyo, Japan	Decision		
Wins Amateur Shoot Boxing All Japan -60kg title
2017-10-29	Win	(Japan) Tadahiko Tsushima	Amateur Shoot Boxing Kansai	Osaka, Japan	Decision (Unanimous)	2	2:00
2017-06-25	Win	(Japan) Kohei Nagaoka	Amateur Shoot Boxing Kansai	Osaka, Japan	Decision (Unanimous)	2	2:00
2017-04-30	NC	(Japan) Koki Ueno	NEXT LEVEL Kansai 38	Osaka, Japan	Doctor stoppage (head clash)	1	
2017-03-05	Win	(Japan) Haru Furumiya	AJGKF XIII	Osaka, Japan	Decision (Unanimous)		
2016-12-18	Win	(Japan) Masahito Okuyama	All Japan Amateur Shoot Boxing	Osaka, Japan	Decision (Unanimous)	2	2:00
Wins Amateur Shoot Boxing All Japan Jr -55kg title
2016-09-25	Win	(Japan) Ryouga Yoshiharu	All Japan Amateur Shoot Boxing West Japan Selection	Osaka, Japan	Decision (Unanimous)	2	2:00
2016-08-13	Win	(Japan) Fumito Ando	SHOOT BOXING OSAKA 2016 "ALPINISME vol.1"	Osaka, Japan	Decision (Unanimous)	2	2:00
2016-01-24	Loss	(Japan) Yuki Kasahara	All Japan Shoot Boxing Amateur	Tokyo, Japan	Decision (Unanimous)	2	2:00
For the Amateur Shoot Boxing All Japan -50kg title
2015-10-03	Loss	(Japan) Ayumu Mita	SHOOT BOXING THE LAST BOMB	Japan	Ext.R Decision (Split)	3	2:00
2015-09-06	Win	(Japan) Tomoya Nishida	Shoot Boxing Amateur Kansai	Osaka, Japan	Ext.R Decision (Split)	3	2:00
2015-03-15		(Japan)	4th All Japan Jr. Kick -45 kg, Quarter Final	Tokyo, Japan	Decision		
2014-11-09	Win	(Japan) Aoi Takahashi	Shoot Boxing Amateur Kansai	Osaka, Japan	Decision (Majority)	2	2:00
2014-09-28	Loss	(Japan) Shogo Tanaka	DEEP KICK 22	Osaka, Japan	Decision (Majority)	3	2:00
Loses the TOP RUN -40kg title.
2014-06-29	Win	(Japan) Ruki Kawamura	Amateur Shoot Boxing Kansai	Osaka, Japan	Decision (Majority)	2	2:00
2014-06-15	Win	(Japan) Haruhi Tokunaga	NEXT LEVEL Kansai 15	Sakai, Japan	Decision (Unanimous)	2	2:00
2014-03-30	Loss	(Japan) Haruto Yasumoto	3rd All Japan Jr. Kick -40 kg, Final	Tokyo, Japan	Decision		
For the All Japan Jr Kick -40kg title.
2014-03-30	Win	(Japan)	3rd All Japan Jr. Kick -40 kg, Semi Final	Tokyo, Japan	Decision		
2014-02-23	Win	(Japan) Naoki Nagano	DEEP KICK 19	Osaka, Japan	Decision (Unanimous)	3	2:00
Defends the TOP RUN -40kg title.
2014-02-16	Win	(Japan) Aoi Takahashi	Shoot Boxing Amateur Kansai	Osaka, Japan	Decision (Unanimous)	2	2:00
2014-02-11	Win	(Japan) Naoki Nagano	Double Impact IV – All Japan Jr Kick Kansai Selection	Osaka, Japan	Ext.R Decision (Unanimous)		
2013-11-16	Win	(Japan) Haruto Yasumoto	Shoot Boxing GROUND ZERO TOKYO 2013	Tokyo, Japan	Decision (Majority)	2	2:00
Wins Shoot Boxing All Japan -40kg title.
2013-10-14	Win	(Japan) Taichi Isogai	Shoot Boxing West Japan Selection	Osaka, Japan	Decision (Split)	2	
2013-09-22	Win	(Japan) Yosuke Sekimoto	DEEP KICK 17	Osaka, Japan	Ext.R Decision (Split)	4	2:00
Wins the TOP RUN -40kg title.
2013-09-01	Win	(Japan) Naoki Nagano	NEXT LEVEL Kansai 9	Higashiōsaka, Japan	Ext.R Decision (Unanimous)	2	2:00
2013-07-07	Win	(Japan) Naoki Nagano	NEXT LEVEL Kansai 8	Sakai, Japan	Decision (Unanimous)	2	2:00
2013-06-15	Win	(Japan) Ayumu Mita	Shoot Boxing Amateur Kansai	Kansai, Japan	Decision (Unanimous)	2	2:00
2013-04-14	Win	(Japan) Kyo Kawakami	Shoot Boxing Amateur Kansai	Kansai, Japan	Decision (Unanimous)	2	2:00
2013-02-24	Win	(Japan) Ayumu Mita	Shoot Boxing Amateur Kansai	Kansai, Japan	Ext.R Decision (Unanimous)	3	2:00
2013-01-27	Loss	(Japan) Ryo Mandokoro	NEXT LEVEL Kansai 4	Sakai, Japan	Decision (Unanimous)	2	
2013-01-27	Win	(Japan) Naoki Asada	NEXT LEVEL Kansai 4	Sakai, Japan	TKO (Knee)	2	
2012-12-16	Loss	(Japan) Ryo Mandokoro	NEXT LEVEL Kansai 3	Osaka, Japan	Decision (Majority)	2	
2012-07-16	Loss	(Japan) Riku Kitani	NEXT LEVEL	Sakai, Japan	Decision (Unanimous)	2	
2012-05-20	Win	(Japan) Toma Maezono	Shoot Boxing Osaka 2012 Alpinisme Young Caesar Cup Vol.2	Osaka, Japan	Decision (Split)	2	
2012-05-06	Win	(Japan) Yuka Sato	NEXT LEVEL	Osaka, Japan	Decision (Unanimous)	2	
2012-03-25	Draw	(Japan) Keisuke	NEXT LEVEL	Habikino, Japan	Decision		
2012-03-25	Win	(Japan) Yoshiho Tane	NEXT LEVEL	Habikino, Japan	Ext.R Decision (Unanimous)		
Legend: Win Loss Draw/No contest Notes

== See also ==
- List of male kickboxers
