= Haruto Yasumoto =

Japanese kickboxer (born 2000)

- Born: May 27, 2000 (age 26); Tokyo, Japan
- Native name: 安本 晴翔
- Other names: Silent Assassin
- Height: 1.70 m (5 ft 7 in)
- Weight: 58 kg (128 lb; 9.1 st)
- Division: Super Flyweight
- Style: Kickboxing
- Stance: Orthodox
- Fighting out of: Tokyo, Japan
- Team: Hashimoto Dojo
- Years active: 2016 - present

Kickboxing record
- Total: 48
- Wins: 41
- By knockout: 19
- Losses: 4
- By knockout: 0
- Draws: 2
- No contests: 1

Other information
- Notable school: Surugadai University

Haruto Yasumoto (安本 晴翔, Yasumoto Haruto, born 27 May 2000) is a Japanese kickboxer and muay thai fighter, currently competing in the featherweight division of RISE, where he is the current champion. He is the former KNOCKOUT RED and WBC Muaythai Japan Featherweight champion.

A professional competitor since 2016, he is the former REBELS two-weight champion and the WPMF World featherweight champion. Prior to making his professional debut, Yasumoto had a lengthy amateur career, during which he captured a grand total of 24 championships.

== Martial arts career ==
=== Super flyweight career ===
==== Early career ====
Yasumoto made his professional debut against Kim Seung Min at REBELS.43 on June 1, 2016. He won the fight by a first-round spinning back fist knockout.

Yasumoto was scheduled to face Taiga Nakayama at Kunlun Fight 49 / Rebels 45 on August 7, 2016. He won the fight by unanimous decision, with scores of 30–28, 30–27 and 30–26.

Yasumoto made his first appearance with Japan Kickboxing Innovation on October 9, 2016, when he was scheduled to fight Ryuta. He won the fight by unanimous decision, with scores of 30–28, 30–28 and 29–28.

Yasumoto was scheduled to face Takuya Hasunuma in a REBELS and Innovation cross-promotional event on January 22, 2017. He dominated every round of the bout, with two judges awarding him a 30-27 scorecard, while the third judge scored the fight as 30-25 in his favor.

Yasumoto was scheduled to face Kazuya Okuwaki at REBELS.49 on March 11, 2017. He won the fight by unanimous decision, with scores of 29–28, 30–27 and 30–27.

==== REBELS Super Flyweight champion ====
Yasumoto challenged Kiminori Matsuzaki for the REBELS Red Super Flyweight title at REBELS.51 on June 11, 2016, at just 16 years of age. His 41 year old opponent was making his first title defense. The difference in experience was likewise notable, as Matsuzaki was a 39–fight veteran, while Yasumoto was making only his sixth professional appearance. Yasumoto won the fight by a unanimous decision, with scores of 49–47, 49–47 and 49–46, spending the majority of the bout pressuring and attempting to overwhelm Matsuzaki. Matsuzaki's sole moment of success was a left elbow in the third round, which resulted in a doctor check due to a cut before Yasumoto was allowed to continue fighting.

For the first fight of his title reign, Yasumoto was scheduled to face Yuya Kosaka in a non-title bout at ROAD TO KNOCK OUT.2 on July 20, 2017. The evenly contested fight was ruled a draw by unanimous decision, with all three judges scoring the bout 29–29.

=== Super bantamweight career ===
==== Move up in weight ====
Yasumoto was scheduled to face the #4 ranked RISE bantamweight Yugo Flyskygym at RISE 119 on September 15, 2017. The fight was contested at 55 kg, which was a 3 kg increase from Yasumoto's previous bouts. He won the fight by a second-round technical knockout due to repeated body shots which forced the referee to stop the fight. The knockout was preceded by a right hook which resulted in a knockdown.

Yasumoto moved back down to 53 kg for his next fight, against Lampoochai Kaewsamrit at Japan Kickboxing Innovation on October 18, 2017. He won the fight by unanimous decision, with scores of 30–28, 30–29 and 30–29.

Yasumoto was scheduled to fight Takahiro Sakuragi at Japan Kickboxing Innovation Champions Carnival 2017 on December 17, 2017. The fight was contested at 57 kg, the heaviest that Yasumoto weighed in at so far in his career. He won the fight by unanimous decision, with all three judges scoring the bout as 30–29.

Yasumoto remained at 57 kg for his next fight, against Yuudai Hamamoto at REBELS.55 on April 27, 2018. He notched his second ever stoppage victory, winning by a second-round technical knockout. The first knockdown was scored with a head kick, while the remaining two were scored with a left straight.

Yasumoto remained at 57 kg from that point on. He was next scheduled to face Dawsakorn Mor.Tasanai at REBELS.57 on August 3, 2018. The fight was ruled a majority draw after the first three rounds, with one judge scoring it for Dawsakorn, while the remaining two scored it as an even 29–29 draw. The judges were split in the same manner after an extra round was fought.

==== Innovation Super Bantamweight champion ====
Yasumoto fought Kazuto for the Innovation Super Bantamweight title at Japan Kickboxing Innovation on December 16, 2018. He won the fight by a third-round knockout. During the first minute of the round, Yasumoto landed a body shot which crumpled Kazuto. Kazuto was able to beat the eight-count, but quickly succumbed to a second body shot.

Yasumoto was scheduled to face the Shootboxing SB Japan Super Bantamweight champion Seiki Ueyama at SHOOT BOXING 2019 act.1 on February 11, 2019 in a non-title bout. Ueyama won the fight by majority decision, with scores of 30–27, 29–29 and 29–28, handing Yasumoto his first professional loss. The most significant moment of the bout came in the third round when Ueyama managed to catch Yasumoto in a standing front choke. Although he wasn't able to finish it, Ueyama was awarded a catch point for an effective attack.

Yasumoto was scheduled to face Hannya Hashimoto in his return to REBELS at REBELS.60 on April 20, 2019. The fight was contested at 59 kg, which was yet another increase in weight for Yasumoto. He dominated every round of the bout, winning by unanimous decision, with scores of 30–26, 30–26 and 30–25.

=== Featherweight career ===
==== REBELS Featherweight champion ====
Yasumoto was scheduled to face Shogo Kuriaki at REBELS.61 on June 9, 2019, for the REBELS Featherweight title. He won the fight by unanimous decision, with scores of 49–47, 49–47 and 49–46. Kuriaki had the most success during the third round, during which he caused a cut on Yasumoto which required a doctor check.

Yasumoto was scheduled to fight Shunta at K.O CLIMAX 2019 SUMMER KICK FEVER on August 18, 2019. He won the fight by a fifth-round knockout.

Yasumoto was scheduled to face Arato at KNOCK OUT × REBELS on October 4, 2019. He won the fight by a first-round technical knockout.

Yasumoto fought Plem TC.MuayThai for the WPMF World Featherweight title at JAPAN KICKBOXING INNOVATION on November 17, 2019. He won the fight by a first-round knockout.

Yasumoto was scheduled to fight Daosayam Nor.Naksin at the inaugural KNOCK OUT CHAMPIONSHIP event on February 11, 2020. He won the fight by split decisoon, with scores of 29–28, 28–29 and 30–29.

Yasumoto appeared at the second KNOCK OUT CHAMPIONSHIP event as well, being scheduled to face Visanlek Meibukai on September 12, 2020. He won the fight by a second-round technical knockout.

Yasumoto made his last appearance with REBELS, before its merger with KNOCKOUT, against BEN Samurai Y'ZD at REBELS 67 on November 8, 2020. He won the fight by a second-round spinning back kick knockout.

==== KNOCKOUT RED Featherweight champion ====
Following the REBELS and KNOCKOUT merger, Yasumoto was announced as the KNOCKOUT RED champion. His first appearance as the KNOCKOUT champion was a non-title bout against Phetsila FurumuraGym at KNOCK OUT ～The REBORN～ on March 13, 2021. He won the fight by a second-round knockout.

Yasumoto was scheduled to face Kenichi Takeuchi at KNOCK OUT 2021 vol.3 on July 18, 2021. He won the fight by a third-round knockout, landing a head kick at the 0:30 minute mark.

Yasumoto was scheduled to face Ryuto Matsumoto for the WBC Muay Thai Japan Featherweight title at NJKF 2021 3rd on September 19, 2021. He won the fight by a third-round technical knockout.

Yasumoto faced Taisei Kakuda at KNOCK OUT 2021 vol.6 on November 28, 2021. He won the fight by unanimous decision, with scores of 29-25, 29-26 and 29-27.

On February 8, 2022, it was announced that Yasumoto would fight at Chakuriki 15 on April 27, 2022, against former MAX Muay Thai champion Yodprapsuek Sor Ninthai. He won the fight by a first-round technical knockout. Yasmuoto knocked Yodprapsuek twice before the stoppage, first time with a right straight and the second time with a flurry of strikes.

Yasumoto was scheduled to face veteran Yosuke Morii at NO KICK NO LIFE on May 28, 2022. This would mark his debut above the 60 kg limit. He won the fight by a third-round knockout.

=== RISE ===
On June 19, 2022, it was announced that Yasumoto had signed with RISE. On July 28, three weeks after he had signed with RISE, it was announced that Yasumoto had vacated the KNOCKOUT RED featherweight title. He made his promotional return against Mehrdad Sayyadi at RISE 160 on July 29, 2022. Yasumoto won the fight by a first-round knockout. The bout was later reviewed and changed to a no contest, as Sayyadi was stopped with an elbow, which is an illegal strike under the RISE rule-set.

Yasumoto faced the sixth-ranked RISE featherweight Kensei Yamakawa at RISE Word Series 2022 on October 15, 2022. He needed just 64 seconds to stop Yamakawa.

Yasumoto faced the two-weight Shootboxing champion Kyo Kawakami, in a Shootboxing rules bout, at RISE WORLD SERIES / SHOOTBOXING-KINGS on December 25, 2022. Although Yasumoto was able to fight to a draw following the first three rounds, he lost the fight by majority decision after the extra fourth round was contested.

Yasumoto faced the 2022 K-1 Featherweight World Grand Prix Tournament Runner-up Toma Tanabe at K-1 World GP 2023: K'Festa 6 on March 12, 2023. He won the fight by unanimous decision, with scores of 30-29, 30-28 and 29-28.

Yasumoto faced Kiyoto Takahashi at NO KICK NO LIFE Okayama Gym 50th Anniversary Event on May 21, 2023. He won the fight by majority decision. Two of the judges awarded Yasumoto a narrow 49–48 scorecard, while the third judge scored the bout as an even 49–49 draw.

Yasumoto was expected to face Kaito Sakaguchi at RISE World Series 2023 Osaka on July 2, 2023. He withdrew from the fight on June 1, due to compartment syndrome in his left leg he sustained in his previous fight with Takahashi, which left him unable to walk. The contest was rescheduled for RISE World Series 2023 - 2nd Round, which took place on August 26, 2023. He lost the fight by unanimous decision, with scores of 29–27, 29–28 and 29–28.

Yasumoto faced Taiki Sawatani at RISE 173 on November 18, 2023. He won the fight by unanimous decision, with scores of 30–28, 30–29 and 30–29.

Yasumoto faced the former RISE Featherweight champion Taisei Umei at RISE 176 on February 23, 2024. He won the fight by majority decision, with scores of 30–28, 30–29 and 29–29.

Yasumoto made his ONE Championship debut against Temirlan Bekmurazev at ONE Friday Fights 62 on May 10, 2024. He won the fight by unanimous decision.

Yasumoto challenged the reigning RISE Featherweight champion Keisuke Monguchi at RISE 182 on October 20, 2024. He won the fight by unanimous decision, with scores of 48–47, 49–47 and 49–47.

Yasumoto faced Wang Xianjin at RISE 185 on January 25, 2025. He won the fight by unanimous decision, with scores of 30–28, 30–28 and 30–28.

Yasumoto made his first RISE Featherweight Championship defense against Yuta Kunieda at RISE 188 on May 31, 2025. He won the fight by a first-round knockout.

== Championships and accomplishments ==
=== Amateur ===
- M-1
  - 2010 M-1 -25 kg Champion
  - 2014 M-ONE WPMF -45 kg Champion
- Windy Super Fight
  - 2010 Windy Super Fight -25 kg Champion
  - 2012 Windy Super Fight -30 kg Champion
  - 2013 Windy Super Fight -35 kg Champion
  - 2014 Windy Super Fight -40 kg Champion
- Martial Arts Japan Kickboxing Federation
  - 2011 MA Kick Jr -28 kg Champion
  - 2012 MA Kick Jr -32 kg Champion
  - 2013 MA Kick Jr -32 kg Champion
- New Japanese Kickboxing Federation
  - 2012 NJKF -30 kg Champion
  - 2013 NJKF -35 kg Champion
- All Japan Jr. Kick
  - 2012 All Japan Jr. Kick -30 kg Champion
  - 2014 All Japan Jr. Kick -40 kg Champion
  - 2015 All Japan Jr. Kick -45 kg Champion
- REBELS
  - 2014 REBELS Blow Cup -40 kg Winner
- Battle of Muay Thai
  - 2014 Battle of Muay Thai -40 kg Champion
- Muaythai Open
  - 2014 MuayThaiOpen -45 kg Champion
- INNOVATION
  - 2015 SMASHERS -50 kg Champion and Best Fighter Award
- WBC Muaythai
  - 2015 WBC Muay Thai All Japan Jr League -50 kg Champion

=== Muay Thai ===
- REBELS
  - 2017 REBELS Red Super Flyweight Championship
  - 2019 REBELS Red Featherweight Championship
- Japan Kickboxing Innovation
  - 2018 Innovation Super Bantamweight Championship
- World Professional Muaythai Federation
  - 2019 WPMF World Featherweight Championship
- KNOCK OUT
  - 2021 KNOCK OUT Red Featherweight Championship
- World Boxing Council Muaythai
  - 2021 WBC Muay Thai Japan Featherweight Championship

=== Kickboxing ===
- RISE
  - 2024 RISE Featherweight (-57.5kg) Championship
    - One successful title defense
  - 2024 RISE Fight of the Year (vs. Keisuke Monguchi)
  - 2025 RISE Fighter of the Year
- Shoot Boxing
  - 2025 Shoot Boxing S-Cup Tournament Winner

== Fight record ==
Kickboxing record
41 Wins (19 (T)KOs), 4 Losses, 2 Draws, 1 No contest
Date	Result	Opponent	Event	Location	Method	Round	Time
2026-12-20		(Thailand) Narak Banglong Auto Max	RISE World Series 2026 Tokyo Final	Tokyo, Japan			
For the vacant RISE Featherweight (-57.5 kg) World Championship.
2026-09-19	Win	(Thailand) Petchpayathai Sor.Poonsawat	RISE World Series 2026 Tokyo 2	Tokyo, Japan	KO (Punches)	1	2:59
2026-06-06	Win	(China) Ze Waliuo	RISE World Series 2026 Tokyo	Tokyo, Japan	Decision (Unanimous)	3	3:00
2026-03-28	Win	(Japan) Takumi Terada	RISE ELDORADO 2026	Tokyo, Japan	Decision (Unanimous)	3	3:00
2025-11-24	Win	(Japan) Kotaro Yamada	SHOOT BOXING 40th Anniversary - S-Cup, Final	Tokyo, Japan	KO (Right cross)	2	2:44
Wins the 2025 Shoot Boxing S-Cup Tournament title.
2025-11-24	Win	(Japan) Koyata Yamada	SHOOT BOXING 40th Anniversary - S-Cup, Semifinals	Tokyo, Japan	TKO (2 Knockdowns)	1	2:21
2025-11-24	Win	(Japan) Kyo Kawakami	SHOOT BOXING 40th Anniversary - S-Cup, Quarterfinals	Tokyo, Japan	Decision (Unanimous)	3	3:00
2025-08-09	Win	(Thailand) Petchuahin Jitmuangnon	SHOOT BOXING 2025 act.4	Tokyo, Japan	Decision (Unanimous)	3	3:00
2025-05-31	Win	(Japan) Yuta Kunieda	RISE 188	Tokyo, Japan	KO (High kick)	1	2:12
Defends the RISE Featherweight Championship.
2025-01-25	Win	(China) Wang Xianjin	RISE 185	Tokyo, Japan	Decision (Unanimous)	3	3:00
2024-10-20	Win	(Japan) Keisuke Monguchi	RISE 182	Tokyo, Japan	Decision (Unanimous)	5	3:00
Wins the RISE Featherweight Championship.
2024-07-26	Loss	(Azerbaijan) Akif Guluzada	ONE Friday Fights 72, Lumpinee Stadium	Bangkok, Thailand	Decision (Unanimous)	3	3:00
2024-05-10	Win	(Russia) Temirlan Bekmurzaev	ONE Friday Fights 62, Lumpinee Stadium	Bangkok, Thailand	Decision (Unanimous)	3	3:00
2024-02-23	Win	(Japan) Taisei Umei	RISE 176	Tokyo, Japan	Decision (Majority)	3	3:00
2023-11-18	Win	(Japan) Taiki Sawatani	RISE 173	Tokyo, Japan	Decision (Unanimous)	3	3:00
2023-08-26	Loss	(Japan) Kaito	RISE World Series 2023 - 2nd Round	Tokyo, Japan	Decision (Unanimous)	3	3:00
2023-05-21	Win	(Japan) Kiyoto Takahashi	Japan Kickboxing Innovation Okayama Gym 50th Anniversary Event 9	Tokyo, Japan	Decision (Majority)	5	3:00
2023-03-12	Win	(Japan) Toma	K-1 World GP 2023: K'Festa 6	Tokyo, Japan	Decision (Unanimous)	3	3:00
2022-12-25	Loss	(Japan) Kyo Kawakami	RISE WORLD SERIES / SHOOTBOXING-KINGS 2022	Tokyo, Japan	Ext.R Decision (Majority)	4	3:00
2022-10-15	Win	(Japan) Kensei Yamakawa	RISE WORLD SERIES 2022	Tokyo, Japan	KO (High kick)	1	1:05
2022-07-29	NC	(Iran) Mehrdad Sayyadi	RISE 160	Tokyo, Japan	No Contest (Illegal elbow)	1	2:22
2022-05-28	Win	(Japan) Yosuke Morii	NO KICK NO LIFE	Tokyo, Japan	KO (Punches)	3	2:18
2022-04-27	Win	(Thailand) Yodprapsuek Sor Ninthai	Chakuriki 15 Fujiwara Festival	Tokyo, Japan	TKO (Referee stoppage)	1	1:07
2021-11-28	Win	(Japan) Taisei Kakuda	KNOCK OUT 2021 vol.6	Tokyo, Japan	Decision (Unanimous)	3	3:00
2021-09-19	Win	(Japan) Ryuto Matsumoto	NJKF 2021 3rd	Tokyo, Japan	TKO (Elbow)	3	0:46
Wins the WBC Muay Thai Japan Featherweight title.
2021-07-18	Win	(Japan) Kenichi Takeuchi	KNOCK OUT 2021 vol.3	Tokyo, Japan	KO (High Kick)	3	0:30
2021-03-13	Win	(Thailand) Phetsila FurumuraGym	KNOCK OUT ～The REBORN～	Tokyo, Japan	KO (Spinning back kick)	2	1:18
2020-11-08	Win	(Thailand) BEN Samurai Y'ZD	REBELS 67	Tokyo, Japan	KO (Spinning back kick)	2	2:38
2020-09-12	Win	(Thailand) Visanlek Meibukai	KNOCK OUT CHAMPIONSHIP.2	Tokyo, Japan	TKO (Doctor stoppage)	2	1:12
2020-02-11	Win	(Thailand) Daosayam Nor.Naksin	KNOCK OUT CHAMPIONSHIP.1	Tokyo, Japan	Decision (Split)	3	3:00
2019-11-17	Win	(Thailand) Plem TC.MuayThai	JAPAN KICKBOXING INNOVATION	Okayama, Japan	KO (Punches)	1	2:00
Wins WPMF World Featherweight title.
2019-10-04	Win	(Japan) Arato	KNOCK OUT × REBELS	Tokyo, Japan	KO (3 Knockdown/right cross)	1	2:01
2019-08-18	Win	(Japan) Shunta	K.O CLIMAX 2019 SUMMER KICK FEVER	Tokyo, Japan	KO (Punches)	5	1:18
2019-06-09	Win	(Japan) Shogo Kuriaki	REBELS.61	Tokyo, Japan	Decision (Unanimous)	5	3:00
Wins REBELS Featherweight title.
2019-04-20	Win	(Japan) Hannya Hashimoto	REBELS.60	Tokyo, Japan	Decision (Unanimous)	3	3:00
2019-02-11	Loss	(Japan) Seiki Ueyama	SHOOT BOXING 2019 act.1	Tokyo, Japan	Decision (Majority)	3	3:00
2018-12-16	Win	(Japan) Kazuto	Japan Kickboxing Innovation	Tokyo, Japan	KO (Left hook to the body)	3	1:12
Wins the Innovation Super Bantamweight title.
2018-08-03	Draw	(Thailand) Dawsakorn Mor.Tasanai	REBELS.57	Tokyo, Japan	Ext.R Decision	4	3:00
2018-04-27	Win	(Japan) Yuudai Hamamoto	REBELS.55	Tokyo, Japan	TKO (Three knockdowns)	2	1:50
2017-12-17	Win	(Japan) Takahiro Sakuragi	Japan Kickboxing Innovation Champions Carnival 2017	Tokyo, Japan	Decision (Unanimous)	3	3:00
2017-10-18	Win	(Thailand) Lampoochai Kaewsamrit	Japan Kickboxing Innovation	Okayama, Japan	Decision (Unanimous)	3	3:00
2017-09-15	Win	(Japan) Yugo Flyskygym	RISE 119	Tokyo, Japan	TKO (Body shots)	2	2:09
2017-07-20	Draw	(Japan) Yuya Kosaka	ROAD TO KNOCK OUT.2	Tokyo, Japan	Decision (Unanimous)	3	3:00
2017-06-11	Win	(Japan) Kiminori Matsuzaki	REBELS.51	Tokyo, Japan	Decision (Unanimous)	5	3:00
Wins the REBELS Super Flyweight title.
2017-03-11	Win	(Japan) Kazuya Okuwaki	REBELS.49	Tokyo, Japan	Decision (Unanimous)	3	3:00
2017-01-22	Win	(Japan) Takuya Hasunuma	REBELS.48 & INNOVATION Champions Carnival	Tokyo, Japan	Decision (Unanimous)	3	3:00
2016-10-09	Win	(Japan) Ryuta	Japan Kickboxing Innovation	Okayama, Japan	Decision (Unanimous)	3	3:00
2016-08-07	Win	(Japan) Taiga Nakayama	Kunlun Fight 49 / Rebels 45	Tokyo, Japan	Decision (Unanimous)	3	3:00
2016-06-01	Win	(Korea) Kim Seung Min	REBELS.43	Tokyo, Japan	KO (Spinning back fist)	1	1:15
Legend: Win Loss Draw/No contest Notes

=== Amateur record ===
Amateur Kickboxing record
Date	Result	Opponent	Event	Location	Method	Round	Time
2016-04-29	Win	(Japan) Keito Akiyama	JAKF SMASHERS 179	Tokyo, Japan	TKO	2	1:58
2016-03-27	Win	(Japan) Koudai Kanamitsu	K-1 Amateur, Final	Tokyo, Japan	Decision (Unanimous)	2	3:00
2016-03-27	Win	(Japan) Naoya Otada	K-1 Amateur, Semi Final	Tokyo, Japan	Decision (Majority)	2	3:00
2016-03-20	Win	(Japan) Teshima	JAKF SMASHERS 178	Tokyo, Japan	Decision (Unanimous)		
2016-02-14	Win	(Japan) Kazuya Kato	K-1 Challenge A-Class -55 kg Tournament, Final	Tokyo, Japan	KO		
2016-02-14	Win	(Japan) Yusei Sakurai	K-1 Challenge A-Class -55 kg Tournament, Semi Final	Tokyo, Japan	Decision (Majority)	2	3:00
2015-08-30	Win	(Japan) Kyosuke Yamaguchi	1st WBC Muay Thai Jr League, All Japan Tournament Final	Tokyo, Japan	Decision		
Wins 2015 WBC Muay Thai Jr League All Japan -50kg title.
2015-08-30	Win	(Japan) Aoshi Kitano	1st WBC Muay Thai Jr League, All Japan Tournament Semi Final	Tokyo, Japan	Decision		
2015-08-02	Win	(Japan) Kohei Watanabe	Muay Thai Super Fight Amateur vol.2 - Suk Wan Kingtong	Tokyo, Japan	Decision (Unanimous)	2	2:00
2015-08-02	Win	(Japan) Michitaka Yamaguchi	Muay Thai Super Fight Amateur vol.2 - Suk Wan Kingtong	Tokyo, Japan	Decision (Unanimous)	2	2:00
2015-07-19	Win	(Japan) Kyosuke Yamaguchi	SMASHERS 175	Tokyo, Japan	Decision		
Wins SMASHERS -50kg title.
2015-06-14	Win	(Japan) Yuuki Miyoshi	JAKF SMASHERS 174	Tokyo, Japan	Decision (Unanimous)	2	1:30
2015-03-22	Win	(Japan) Hidenojou Shimizu	JAKF SMASHERS 170	Tokyo, Japan	Decision	2	1:30
Defends SMASHERS -45kg title.
2015-03-15	Win	(Japan) Yuya Hayashi	4th All Japan Jr. Kick -45 kg, Final	Tokyo, Japan	Decision		
Wins the All Japan Jr Kick -45kg title.
2015-03-15	Win	(Japan)	4th All Japan Jr. Kick -45 kg, Semi Final	Tokyo, Japan	Decision		
2015-03-15	Win	(Japan)	4th All Japan Jr. Kick -45 kg, Quarter Final	Tokyo, Japan	Decision		
2014-12-21	Loss	(Japan) Haruto Abe	Windy Sports Tournament, Semi Final	Tokyo, Japan	Decision		
2014-12-13	Win	(Japan) Ryutaro Uchida	JAKF SMASHERS Tournament	Tokyo, Japan	Decision	2	1:30
2014-11-30	Win	(Japan) Hayate	TENKAICHI Fight	Tokyo, Japan	Decision (Unanimous)	3	2:00
2014-10-19	Win	(Japan) Madoki Tanaka	BOM Amateur 8	Yokohama, Japan	Decision	2	2:00
2014-10-13	Win	(Japan) Kyo Kawakami	MUAYTHAI WINDY SUPER FIGHT vol.18 in KYOTO	Kyoto, Japan	Decision (Unanimous)	2	2:00
2014-10-05	Win	(Japan) Rikusho Kabe	MuayThaiOpen 28	Yokohama, Japan	KO		
Wins MuayThaiOpen Amateur -45kg title.
2014-09-21	Win	(Japan) Shino Ishibashi	JAKF SMASHERS 167	Tokyo, Japan	Decision (Unanimous)	2	1:30
2014-08-31	Draw	(Japan) Aito Sasaki	Japan Kickboxing INNOVATION	Tokyo, Japan	Decision	2	2:00
2014-08-17	Loss	(Japan) Koki Osaki	MUAYTHAI WINDY SUPER FIGHT vol.17	Tokyo, Japan	Decision (Unanimous)	3	2:00
2014-06-29	Win	(Japan) Riichi Hoshino	Muay Thai WINDY Super Fight vol.16, Final	Tokyo, Japan	Decision (Unanimous)	5	1:00
Wins Windy Super Fight -40kg title.
2014-06-29	Win	(Japan) Ryutaro Uchida	Muay Thai WINDY Super Fight vol.16, Semi Final	Tokyo, Japan	Decision (Split)	2	1:30
2014-06-29	Win	(Japan) Shinnosuke Hatsuda	Muay Thai WINDY Super Fight vol.16, Quarter Final	Tokyo, Japan	Decision		
2014-06-29	Win	(Japan) Retsu Akabane	Muay Thai WINDY Super Fight vol.16, First Round	Tokyo, Japan	Decision		
2014-06-01	Win	(Japan) Kou Sugita	JAKF SMASHERS 165	Tokyo, Japan	Decision (Unanimous)	2	1:30
2014-05-06	Win	(Japan) Toki Tamaru	The Battle of Muay Thai Amateur 6, -40 kg Championship League	Tokyo, Japan	Decision	2	2:00
Wins the BOM Amateur -40kg title.
2014-05-06	Win	(Japan) Taison Suzuki	The Battle of Muay Thai Amateur 6, -40 kg Championship League	Tokyo, Japan	Decision	2	2:00
2014-05-06	Win	(Japan) Retsu Akabane	The Battle of Muay Thai Amateur 6, -40 kg Championship League	Tokyo, Japan	Decision	2	2:00
2014-03-30	Win	(Japan) Kaito Sakaguchi	3rd All Japan Jr. Kick -40 kg, Final	Tokyo, Japan	Decision		
Wins the All Japan Jr Kick -40kg title.
2014-03-30	Win	(Japan)	3rd All Japan Jr. Kick -40 kg, Semi Final	Tokyo, Japan	Decision		
2014-03-30	Win	(Japan)	3rd All Japan Jr. Kick -40 kg, Quarter Final	Tokyo, Japan	Decision		
2014-03-23	Win	(Japan) Ryuta Inoue	JAKF SMASHERS 163	Tokyo, Japan	KO	2	
2014-03-16	Win	(Japan) Toki Tamaru	REBELS.25	Tokyo, Japan	Decision	2	2:00
2014-02-11	Win	(Japan) Jukiya Itō	REBELS Amateur BLOW-CUP 24, Final	Tokyo, Japan	Decision	1	2:00
2014-02-11	Win	(Japan) Yuya Hayashi	REBELS Amateur BLOW-CUP 24, Semi Final	Tokyo, Japan	Decision	1	3:00
2013-12-02	Win	(Japan) Jun Sakuma	6th Kokusai Junior Kickboxing	Japan	Decision		
2013-11-16	Loss	(Japan) Kaito Sakaguchi	SHOOT BOXING GROUND ZERO TOKYO 2013	Tokyo, Japan	Decision (Majority)	2	2:00
For the Shoot Boxing All Japan -40kg title.
2013-11-03	Win	(Japan) Jinnojou Shimizu	JAKF Amateur	Tokyo, Japan	Decision (Majority)	2	1:30
2013-10-13	Win	(Japan) Kotaro Yamada	Amateur Shootboxing	Tokyo, Japan	Decision		
2013-10-06	Win	(Japan) Ikko Oota	Blizzard Gym - Muay Thai - Samak Len 4	Tokyo, Japan	Decision	3	2:00
Wins NJKF Amateur -35kg title.
2013-09-08	Loss	(Japan) Yuuta Sasaki	Battle of Muay Thai Amateur, Final	Tokyo, Japan	Decision	2	2:00
2013-09-08	Win	(Japan) Kaisei Yamada	Battle of Muay Thai Amateur, Semi Final	Tokyo, Japan	Decision	2	2:00
2013-09-08	Win	(Japan) Raito Tamagawa	Battle of Muay Thai Amateur, Quarter Final	Tokyo, Japan	Decision	2	2:00
2013-08-11	Win	(Japan) Riichi Hoshino	Muay Thai WINDY Super Fight vol.14, Final	Tokyo, Japan	Decision	5	1:30
Wins Windy Super Fight -35kg title.
2013-08-11	Win	(Japan)	Muay Thai WINDY Super Fight vol.14, Semi Final	Tokyo, Japan	Decision		
2013-06-30	Win	(Japan) Ikkō Oota	NJKF Muay Thai Open 23	Tokyo, Japan	Decision (Unanimous)	2	3:00
2013-05-12	Loss	(Japan) Ruka Tagawa	DEEP☆KICK 15	Osaka, Japan	Decision (Unanimous)	2	3:00
For the TOP RUN -35kg title.
2013-05-06	Win	(Japan) Jukiya Itō	REBELS Amateur BLOW-CUP 16	Tokyo, Japan	Decision (Unanimous)	2	2:00
2013-03-31	Loss	(Japan) Takasuke Sekimto	All Japan Jr Kick, Semi Final	Tokyo, Japan	Decision		
2013-03-31	Win	(Japan)	All Japan Jr Kick, Quarter Final	Tokyo, Japan	Decision		
2013-03-17	Win	(Japan) Toki Tamaru	MA Kick BREAK-35	Tokyo, Japan	Decision	3	1:30
Wins MA Kick Jr -32kg title.
2013-03-03	Win	(Japan) Jukiya Itō	REBELS Amateur BLOW-CUP 14	Tokyo, Japan	Ex.R Decision (Unanimous)	3	2:00
2013-02-03	Win	(Japan) Retsu Akabane	REBELS Amateur BLOW-CUP 13	Tokyo, Japan	Decision (Unanimous)	2	2:00
2012-11-18	Win	(Japan) REIYA	MA Japan Kick 2012 -FINAL-	Tokyo, Japan	KO	2	
2012-10-21	Win	(Japan) Ryutaro Uchida	Muay Thai Open 22	Tokyo, Japan	Decision	3	1:30
Defends NJKF Amateur -30kg title.
2012-08-05	Win	(Japan) Ryuya Okuwaki	Muay Yoko 19	Tokyo, Japan	Decision	2	2:00
2012-06-10	Win	(Japan) Ikko Oota	Muay Thai WINDY Super Fight vol.12	Tokyo, Japan	Decision		
Wins Windy Super Fight -30kg title.
2012-05-26	Win	(Japan) Ryuya Koyama	Muay Thai Open 20	Tokyo, Japan	Decision (Split)	3	1:30
Wins the NJKF Amateur -30kg title.
2012-05-06	Win	(Japan) REIYA	MA Japan Kick BREAK-25 - CANNONBALL	Tokyo, Japan	Decision (Unanimous)	3	1:30
Wins the MA Jr Kick -32kg title.
2012-04-15	Win	(Japan) Naito Harada	All Japan Jr Kick, Final	Tokyo, Japan	Decision	3	2:00
Wins the All Japan Jr Kick -30kg title.
2012-04-15	Win	(Japan)	All Japan Jr Kick, Semi Final	Tokyo, Japan	Decision	2	2:00
2012-04-15	Win	(Japan)	All Japan Jr Kick, Quarter Final	Tokyo, Japan	Decision	2	2:00
2012-03-04	Win	(Japan) Tōma Sugihara	All Japan Jr Kick Kanto Selection, Final	Tokyo, Japan	Decision	3	2:00
2012-03-04	Win	(Japan) Naito Harada	All Japan Jr Kick Kanto Selection, Semi Final	Tokyo, Japan	Decision	2	2:00
2012-03-04	Win	(Japan) Rei Yamamoto	All Japan Jr Kick Kanto Selection, Quarter Final	Tokyo, Japan	Decision	2	2:00
2012-01-29	Loss	(Japan) Naito Harada	M-1 Amateur Event, Semi Final	Chiba Prefecture, Japan	Decision	2	2:00
2012-01-29	Win	(Japan) Ryuusei Kashiwagi	M-1 Amateur Event, Quarter Final	Chiba Prefecture, Japan	Decision	2	2:00
2011-08-07	Win	(Japan) Kippei Niina	Muay Lok 2011 3rd	Tokyo, Japan	Decision (Unanimous)	2	2:00
2011-07-18	Win	(Japan) Kan Kikuchi	MA Japan Kick BREAK-16 - GRASP	Tokyo, Japan	Decision	3	1:30
Defends the MA Jr Kick -28kg title.
2011-06-05	Win	(Japan) Naoto Fukuda	Muay Yoko 15	Tokyo, Japan	Decision		
2011-04-24	Win	(Japan) Naito Harada	MA Japan Kick BREAK-12 -It starts-	Tokyo, Japan	Decision	3	1:30
Wins the MA Jr Kick -28kg title.
2011-04-17	Win	(Japan) Ryunosuke Suzuki	MA Kick Amateur 135	Tokyo, Japan	Decision	2	1:30
2010-11-07	Win	(Japan) Shogo Nakajima	Muay Thai WINDY Super Fight vol.5 2010 FINAL	Tokyo, Japan	Decision		
Defends Windy Super Fight -25kg title.
2010-10-10	Win	(Japan) Shogo Gokan	MANihon Kick BREAK-6	Tokyo, Japan	Decision	2	1:30
2010-09-19	Win	(Japan) Riku Oonishi	Muay Thai WINDY Super Fight vol.4	Tokyo, Japan	Decision		
Wins Windy Super Fight -25kg title.
2010-08-29	Win	(Japan) Naito Harada	M-1 Muay Thai Amateur 36 - M-1 Kid's CHAMPION CARNIVAL 2010 2nd	Tokyo, Japan	Decision (Majority)	3	
Defends M-1 Muay Thai Amateur -25kg title.
2010-03-28	Win	(Japan) Riku Oonishi	M-1 Muay Thai Amateur 33 - M-1 Kid's CHAMPION CARNIVAL 2010	Tokyo, Japan	Decision (Unanimous)	3	
Wins M-1 Muay Thai Amateur -25kg title.
2010-02-28	Win	(Japan) Naito Harada	M-1 Muay Thai Amateur 32	Tokyo, Japan	Decision		
2010-01-17	Draw	(Japan) Riku Oonishi	Muay Lok Junior 1	Tokyo, Japan	Decision		
Legend: Win Loss Draw/No contest Notes

== See also ==
- List of male kickboxers
