= Rasta Kido =

Japanese kickboxer

Rasta
- Born: Rasta Kido (城戸 良星); January 8, 1997 (age 29); Tokyo, Japan
- Height: 160 cm (5 ft 3 in)
- Weight: 55.0 kg (121.3 lb; 8.66 st)
- Style: Kickboxing, Karate
- Stance: Orthodox
- Fighting out of: Tokyo, Japan
- Team: Top Lead Gym; Team Bull (2021-2024); Hirai Dojo (former)
- Years active: 2013 - present

Kickboxing record
- Total: 40
- Wins: 28
- By knockout: 6
- Losses: 11
- By knockout: 3
- Draws: 1

Rasta Kido known as Rasta (良星) is a Japanese kickboxer. A professional competitor since 2013, Kido is the former BigBang Super Bantamweight titlist and one-time RISE Bantamweight title challenger. He is a highly considered Flyweight fighter by Combat Press.

== Kickboxing career ==
Rasta was scheduled to face Masaki Takeuchi at RISE 130 on February 3, 2019. He won the fight by unanimous decision, with scores of 30-29, 30-28 and 30-29.

Rasta made his KNOCK OUT debut against Keisuke Miyamoto at KNOCK OUT 2019 SPRING: THE FUTURE IS IN THE RING on April 29, 2019, in a five-round fight. He won the closely-contested fight by unanimous decision, with scores of 50-49, 50-49 and 50-47.

Rasta was scheduled to face Tomo Arimatsu at RISE 133 on July 5, 2019. He won the fight by a first-round knockout, stopping Arimatsu with a right straight at the 2:05 minute mark of the round.

Rasta was scheduled to face Yuki Masato at RISE 134 on September 29, 2019. He won the fight by a third-round technical knockout.

His seven-fight winning streak earned Rasta the chance to challenge the reigning RISE Bantamweight champion Masahiko Suzuki at RISE 136 on January 13, 2020. The bout was a rematch of their July 6, 2018, meeting, which Rasta lost by unanimous decision. Rasta lost the fight by a late fourth-round knockout. It was the first stoppage loss of his kickboxing career.

Rasta was scheduled to fight Daiki Toita at RISE 141 on August 23, 2020. He won the fight by unanimous decision, with scores of 30-29, 30-28 and 30-28.

Rasta made his RIZIN debut against the four-time Rajadamnern Stadium title challenger Mutsuki Ebata at Rizin 24 - Saitama on September 27, 2020. He lost the fight by unanimous decision.

Rasta was scheduled to face Keito Naito at RISE 146 on February 23, 2021. He won the fight by unanimous decision.

Rasta was scheduled to face the former WBC Muaythai and WMC Japan titleholder David Chibana at RISE 151 on July 28, 2021. Rasta lost the fight by split decision, after an extra round was contested.

Rasta was scheduled to face the #4 ranked RISE bantamweight Takuya at RISE 152 on October 22, 2021. He won the fight by unanimous decision, with scores of 30-27, 30-27 and 30-26. He scored the sole knockdown of the fight in the second round, flooring Takuya with a high kick.

Rasta faced Ryunosuke Omori at RISE 157 on April 24, 2022. He lost the fight by knockout in the second round.

Kyotani faced Yuki Kyotani at RISE 177 on April 21, 2024. He lost the fight by unanimous decision.

Rasta faced Hyuga at RISE WORLD SERIES 2024 YOKOHAMA on September 8, 2024. He won the fight by unanimous decision, with scores of 29—27, 30—27 and 30—26.

== Titles and accomplishments ==
=== Kickboxing ===
==== Professional ====
- Bigbang
  - 2016 Bigbang Super Bantamweight Champion
    - Three successful title defenses
  - 2024 Bigbang Super Bantamweight Champion

==== Amateur ====
- 2013 J-NETWORK All Japan Championship A-League Bantamweight Winner & event MVP

== Fight record ==
Kickboxing record
28 Wins (6 (T)KO's), 11 Losses, 1 Draw, 0 No Contest
Date	Result	Opponent	Event	Location	Method	Round	Time
2025-12-21	Loss	(Japan) Akito Nakashima	Maturi BOM-BA-YE	Okinawa, Japan	KO	1	
2025-11-02	Win	(Japan) Hiroya Oshima	Super Bigbang 2025	Yokohama, Japan	Decision (Unanimous)	3	3:00
2025-08-02	Win	(Thailand) Auto Nor.Naksin	RISE WORLD SERIES 2025 Tokyo	Tokyo, Japan	KO (Left cross)	1	2:32
2025-06-01	Loss	(Japan) Koki	Bigbang 52	Tokyo, Japan	Decision (Majority)	3	3:00
Loses the Bigbang Super Bantamweight (-55kg) title.
2025-04-19	Win	(Japan) Ryoya Ito	RISE 187	Tokyo, Japan	Decision (Majority)	3	3:00
2024-09-29	Win	(Japan) Sho Uchida	Bigbang 50	Tokyo, Japan	Decision (Majority)	3	3:00
Wins the vacant Bigbang Super Bantamweight (-55kg) title.
2024-09-08	Win	(Japan) Hyuga	RISE WORLD SERIES 2024 YOKOHAMA	Yokohama, Japan	Decision (Unanimous)	3	3:00
2024-04-21	Loss	(Japan) Yuki Kyotani	RISE 177	Tokyo, Japan	Decision (Unanimous)	3	3:00
2022-04-24	Loss	(Japan) Ryunosuke Omori	RISE 157	Tokyo, Japan	KO (Punches)	2	2:38
2021-10-22	Win	(Japan) Takuya	RISE 152	Tokyo, Japan	Decision (Unanimous)	3	3:00
2021-07-28	Loss	(Japan) David Chibana	RISE 151	Tokyo, Japan	Ext.R Decision (Split)	4	3:00
2021-02-23	Win	(Japan) Keito Naito	RISE 146	Tokyo, Japan	Decision (Unanimous)	3	3:00
2020-09-27	Loss	(Japan) Mutsuki Ebata	Rizin 24 - Saitama	Saitama, Japan	Decision (Unanimous)	3	3:00
2020-08-23	Win	(Japan) Daiki Toita	RISE 141	Tokyo, Japan	Decision (Unanimous)	3	3:00
2020-01-13	Loss	(Japan) Masahiko Suzuki	RISE 136	Tokyo, Japan	KO (Straight Right)	4	2:49
For the RISE Bantamweight Championship.
2019-09-29	Win	(Japan) Yuki Masato	RISE 134	Tokyo, Japan	TKO (3 Knockdowns)	3	1:28
2019-07-05	Win	(Japan) Tomo Arimatsu	RISE 133	Tokyo, Japan	KO (Straight Right)	1	2:05
2019-04-29	Win	(Japan) Keisuke Miyamoto	KNOCK OUT 2019 SPRING: THE FUTURE IS IN THE RING	Tokyo, Japan	Decision (Unanimous)	5	3:00
2019-02-03	Win	(Japan) Masaki Takeuchi	RISE 130	Tokyo, Japan	Decision (Unanimous)	3	3:00
2018-12-27	Win	(Japan) Taku Ookubo	BigBang 34	Tokyo, Japan	Decision (Unanimous)	3	3:00
Defends the BigBang Super Bantamweight title.
2018-11-02	Win	(Korea) Jaehyuk Kang	RISE 128	Tokyo, Japan	KO (High Kick and punches)	2	
2018-09-16	Win	(Japan) Ryuji Horio	RISE 127	Tokyo, Japan	Decision (Unanimous)	3	3:00
2018-07-06	Loss	(Japan) Masahiko Suzuki	RISE 126	Tokyo, Japan	Decision (Unanimous)	3	3:00
2018-06-03	Win	(Japan) Yu Thong A	BigBang 33	Tokyo, Japan	Decision (Unanimous)	3	3:00
2018-02-18	Win	(Japan) Yuta Hayashi	BigBang 32	Tokyo, Japan	Decision (Unanimous)	3	3:00
2017-12-03	Win	(Japan) Chikara Iwao	BigBang 31	Tokyo, Japan	Decision (Unanimous)	3	3:00
Defends the BigBang Super Bantamweight title.
2017-10-08	Win	(Japan) Takashi Oono	BigBang Isehara 2017	Tokyo, Japan	Decision (Majority)	3	3:00
2017-09-03	Win	(Japan) Mochifumi Takahashi	BigBang 30	Tokyo, Japan	TKO (Ref. Stoppage/Punches)	2	2:43
2017-06-04	Draw	(Japan) Chikara Iwao	BigBang 29	Tokyo, Japan	Decision (Majority)	3	3:00
Defends the BigBang Super Bantamweight title.
2017-04-02	Win	(Japan) Takaaki	Krush.75	Tokyo, Japan	Decision (Unanimous)	3	3:00
2017-01-15	Loss	(Japan) Namito Izawa	Krush.72	Tokyo, Japan	Decision (Unanimous)	3	3:00
2016-09-04	Win	(Japan) Takashi Ohno	BigBang 26	Tokyo, Japan	Decision (Unanimous)	3	3:00
Wins the BigBang Super Bantamweight title.
2016-06-05	Win	(Japan) Ryo Pegasus	BigBang 25	Tokyo, Japan	Decision (Unanimous)	3	3:00
2016-02-21	Win	(Japan) Yu Thong A	BigBang 24	Tokyo, Japan	Decision (Unanimous)	3	3:00
2015-12-06	Loss	(Japan) Chikara Iwao	BigBang 23	Tokyo, Japan	Decision (Majority)	3	3:00
2013-12-29	Win	(Japan) Yuki	NJKF - Kizuna II	Tokyo, Japan	Decision (Unanimous)	3	3:00
2013-12-01	Win	(Japan) Shuto Hagiwara	M-fight - The Battle of Muaythai III	Tokyo, Japan	Decision (Unanimous)	3	3:00
2013-10-14	Win	(Japan) Yuya Iwanami	M-fight - Shuken 13	Tokyo, Japan	Decision (Unanimous)	3	3:00
2013-09-08	Loss	(Japan) Takuya Saenchaigym	M-fight - The Battle of Muaythai II	Tokyo, Japan	Decision (Unanimous)	3	3:00
2013-06-29	Loss	(Japan) Toraji Otawara	TRIBELATE vol.40 -Hybrid Club Fight-	Tokyo, Japan	Decision (Majority)	3	3:00
2013-04-13	Win	(Japan) Yuta	NJKF - Kizuna I PIT Gym 20th Anniversary Show	Tokyo, Japan	TKO	2	
Legend: Win Loss Draw/No contest Notes

=== Amateur record ===
Amateur Kickboxing Record
Date	Result	Opponent	Event	Location	Method	Round	Time
2013-08-04	Loss	(Japan) Daisuke Hara	J-GROW 43	Tokyo, Japan	Decision	1	3:00
2013-07-21	Win	(Japan) Ryusei Shimizu	REBELS.18	Tokyo, Japan	KO	1	1/38
2013-06-09	Win	(Japan) Yuya Kosaka	TNK1 feat. REBELS	Takasaki, Japan	Decision (Unanimous)	2	3:00
2013-05-12	Win	(Japan) Michitake Shioi	BOM Kickboxing Amateur	Kanagawa Prefecture, Japan		2	2:00
2013-05-12	Win	(Japan) Yuya Inako	BOM Kickboxing Amateur	Kanagawa Prefecture, Japan		2	2:00
2013-05-04	Win	(Japan) Kousei Nakao	7th J-NETWORK All Japan Championship	Tokyo, Japan	Decision		
Wins the 2013 J-NETWORK All Japan A-League Bantamweight title.
2013-03-24	Win	(Japan) Ryo Watanabe	J-NETWORK	Tokyo, Japan	TKO		
2013	Win	(Japan) Hiroyuki Ishihara	TNT Amateur YZD Gym	Tokyo, Japan	Decision		
2012-10-28	Win	(Japan) Ruki Miwa	REBELS MUAY-THAI 1	Tokyo, Japan	Decision (Unanimous)	2	2:00
2012-10-21	Loss	(Japan) Tenshin Nasukawa	Muay Lok 2012 3rd	Tokyo, Japan	Decision	2	2:00
2012-09-02	Win	(Japan) Yuki Egawa	BigBang Amateur Kickboxing	Tokyo, Japan	Decision		
2012-07-01	Win	(Japan) Yuki Kurumizawa	Amateur REBELS BLOW-CUP 7	Tokyo, Japan	Decision	2	2:00
2012-06-03	Loss	(Japan) Taiga Kawabe	BigBang Amateur 6	Tokyo, Japan	Decision	2	1:30
2012-04-15	Loss	(Japan) Kaito Ono	All Japan Jr. Kick Tournament, Semi Final	Osaka, Japan	Decision	2	2:00
2012-04-15	Win	(Japan)	All Japan Jr. Kick Tournament, Quarter Final	Osaka, Japan			
2012-03-04	Win	(Japan) Yuki Egawa	All Japan Jr. Kick Kanto Area Selection Tournament, Final	Tokyo, Japan	Decision		
2012-03-04	Win	(Japan)	All Japan Jr. Kick Kanto Area Selection Tournament, Semi Final	Tokyo, Japan	Decision		
2012-03-04	Win	(Japan)	All Japan Jr. Kick Kanto Area Selection Tournament, Quarter Final	Tokyo, Japan	Decision		
2011-12-18	Loss	(Japan) Atsuki Senoo	KAMINARIMON	Tokyo, Japan	Decision	2	1:30
Legend: Win Loss Draw/No contest Notes

== See also ==
- List of male kickboxers
