= Keisuke Monguchi =

Japanese kickboxer (born 1995)

- Born: 25 May 1995 (age 31); Suita, Japan
- Native name: 門口佳佑
- Other names: Frenzy Destroyer
- Height: 170 cm (5 ft 7 in)
- Weight: 57.5 kg (127 lb; 9 st 1 lb)
- Division: Super Flyweight
- Style: Kyokushin, Kickboxing
- Stance: Orthodox
- Fighting out of: Toyokawa, Aichi, Japan
- Team: Striking Gym Ares
- Years active: 2018 - present

Kickboxing record
- Total: 24
- Wins: 18
- By knockout: 3
- Losses: 5
- By knockout: 1
- Draws: 1

Keisuke Monguchi (門口佳佑, born 25 May 1995) is a Japanese kickboxer who was the 2022 RISE featherweight champion.

As of August 2021, he is the #10 ranked Super Flyweight in the world, according to Combat Press.

== Kickboxing career ==
=== RISE ===
Monguchi made his professional debut against Masaaki Ono on 16 July 2018. He won the fight by a third-round right hook knockout.

Monguchi was scheduled to make his second professional appearance against Kojiro Flysky Gym at RISE 127 on 16 September 2018. The fight was ruled a majority draw.

Monguchi was scheduled to face Hyuma Hitachi at RISE 128 on 2 November 2018. He won the fight by a first-round technical knockout.

Monguchi fought another Target Shibuya gym representative, YA-MAN, at RISE 130 on 3 February 2019. He won the fight by unanimous decision, with scores of 30–28, 29–28 and 29–27.

Monguchi made his first appearance at a RISE EVOL event, being scheduled to face Teppei Tsuda at RISE EVOL.3 on 26 April 2019. It was the first RISE ranked opponent that Monguchi faced in his career. He won the fight by unanimous decision, with scores of 30–26, 30–26 and 30–27.

Monguchi was scheduled to face the 2018 RISE Rookies Cup winner Naoki Yamada at RISE WORLD SERIES 2019 Semi-Final Round in OSAKA on 21 July 2019. He won the fight by split decision.

Monguchi faced Ryuji Horio at RISE 135 on 4 November 2019. He won the fight by a convincing unanimous decision, with all three judges awarding him every single round of the bout.

Monguchi was scheduled to face Kensei Yamakawa at RISE 137 on 23 February 2020. He won the fight by unanimous decision, winning all three rounds on all three of the judges' scorecards.

Monguchi faced Taiki Sawatani at RISE 143 on 14 November 2020. He won the fight by unanimous decision, with scores of 29–28, 30–28 and 30–28.

Monguchi suffered the first loss of his professional career at the hands of Masaki Takeuchi at RISE 145 on 30 January 2021. Takeuchi won the fight by unanimous decision, with one scorecard of 30–29 in his favor, and two scorecards of 30–28 in his favor.

Monguchi was scheduled to fight Ryoga Hirano at Rise on Abema 2 on 16 May 2021. He won the fight by unanimous decision, with scores of 30–29, 30–28 and 30–28.

Monguchi was scheduled to face Kaito at Rise World Series 2021 on 18 July 2021. Kaito utilized his longer reach to win the closely contested bout by split decision, with scores of 30–29, 30–29 and 29–30.

Monguchi was booked to face Yoshinobu Ozaki at RISE 155 on 23 February 2022. He won the fight by a first-round technical knockout, after successfully knocking Ozaki down three times by the 1:51 minute mark of the opening round.

==== RISE Featherweight champion ====
Monguchi challenged the reigning RISE featherweight champion Taisei Umei at RISE 161 on 28 August 2022. He won the fight by unanimous decision, with two judges scoring the bout 50–46 for him, while the third judge scored all five rounds of the bout in his favor.

Monguchi faced Kotaro Yamada in a Shootboxing rules bout at RISE WORLD SERIES / SHOOTBOXING-KINGS on 25 December 2022. He won the fight by unanimous decision, with two scorecards of 29–26 and one scorecard of 29–25. Monguchi twice knocked his opponent down in the third round, the first time with a flying knee and the second time with a right hook. Yamada scored a shoot point in the second round with a hip throw.

Monguchi faced the former Krush Featherweight champion Takahito Niimi at RISE EL DORADO 2023 on 26 March 2023. He won the fight by unanimous decision. Two of the judges scored the bout 30–28 in his favor, while the third judge awarded him a narrower 30–29 scorecard.

Monguchi faced the former two-weight Shootboxing champion Kyo Kawakami in a non-title bout at RISE World Series 2023 - 1st Round on 2 July 2023. He won the fight by majority decision, with two scorecards of 30–28 and 30–29 and one even 29–29 scorecard.

Monguchi made his maiden RISE Featherweight title defense against Kaito Sakaguchi at RISE 172 on 29 October 2023. He won the fight by unanimous decision, with scores of 50–47, 49–47 and 49–47.

Monguchi faced the K-1 Featherweight champion Taito Gunji at K-1 World MAX 2024 - World Tournament Opening Round on 20 March 2024. He lost the fight by split decision, after an extra fourth round was contested.

Monguchi made his second RISE Featherweight Championship defense against Haruto Yasumoto at RISE 182 on 20 October 2024. He lost the fight by unanimous decision.

==== Post title reign ====
Monguchi faced Auto Nor.Naksin at RISE WORLD SERIES 2024 Final on 21 December 2024. He won the fight by majority decision.

Monguchi faced the reigning RISE bantamweight champion Koki Osaki in a bantamweight non-title bout at RISE Fire Ball on 11 May 2025. He lost the fight by second-round technical knockout. It was the first stoppage loss of his professional career.

Monguchi made his ONE Championship debut against Zhao Zhengdong at ONE Friday Fights 139 on January 23, 2026.

== Titles and accomplishments ==
=== Kickboxing ===
- RISE
  - 2022 RISE Featherweight (-57.5kg) Championship
    - One successful title defense
  - 2024 RISE Fight of the Year (vs. Haruto Yasumoto)

=== Karate ===
- World Karate Organization
  - 2006 WKO Shinkyokunshinkai All Shikoku 5th Grade Championship Third Place
  - 2015 WKO Shinkyokyushinkai All Kanto Weight Championship Lightweight Runner-up
  - 2017 WKO Shinkyokyushinkai All Kanto Weight Championship Lightweight Runner-up

== Kickboxing record ==
Kickboxing record
18 Wins (3 (T)KO's), 6 Losses, 1 Draw, 0 No Contest
Date	Result	Opponent	Event	Location	Method	Round	Time
2026-08-28	Win	(South Korea) Jung Hyun Woo	ONE The Inner Circle 28, Lumpinee Stadium	Bangkok, Thailand	Decision (Split)	3	3:00
2026-01-23	Loss	(China) Zhao Zhengdong	ONE Friday Fights 139, Lumpinee Stadium	Bangkok, Thailand	TKO (Punches)	3	1:21
2025-11-02	Win	(Japan) Ryuto	RISE World Series 2025 Final	Tokyo, Japan	Decision (Majority)	3	3:00
2025-05-11	Loss	(Japan) Koki Osaki	RISE Fire Ball	Nagoya, Japan	TKO (Referee stoppage)	2	2:17
2024-12-21	Win	(Thailand) Auto Nor.Naksin	RISE WORLD SERIES 2024 Final	Chiba, Japan	Decision (Majority)	3	3:00
2024-10-20	Loss	(Japan) Haruto Yasumoto	RISE 182	Tokyo, Japan	Decision (Unanimous)	5	3:00
Loses the RISE Featherweight Championship.
2024-03-20	Loss	(Japan) Taito Gunji	K-1 World MAX 2024 - World Tournament Opening Round	Tokyo, Japan	Ext.R Decision (Split)	4	3:00
2023-10-29	Win	(Japan) Kaito	RISE 172	Tokyo, Japan	Decision (Unanimous)	5	3:00
Defends the RISE Featherweight Championship.
2023-07-02	Win	(Japan) Kyo Kawakami	RISE World Series 2023 - 1st Round	Osaka, Japan	Decision (Majority)	3	3:00
2023-03-26	Win	(Japan) Takahito Niimi	RISE ELDORADO 2023	Tokyo, Japan	Decision (Unanimous)	3	3:00
2022-12-25	Win	(Japan) Kotaro Yamada	RISE WORLD SERIES / SHOOTBOXING-KINGS 2022	Tokyo, Japan	Decision (Unanimous)	3	3:00
2022-08-28	Win	(Japan) Taisei Umei	RISE 161	Tokyo, Japan	Decision (Unanimous)	5	3:00
Wins the RISE Featherweight Championship.
2022-02-23	Win	(Japan) Yoshinobu Ozaki	RISE 155	Tokyo, Japan	TKO (Three knockdowns)	1	1:51
2021-07-18	Loss	(Japan) Kaito	Rise World Series 2021	Osaka, Japan	Decision (Split)	3	3:00
2021-05-16	Win	(Japan) Ryoga Hirano	Rise on Abema 2	Ōta, Tokyo, Japan	Decision (Unanimous)	3	3:00
2021-01-30	Loss	(Japan) Masaki Takeuchi	RISE 145	Bunkyo, Tokyo, Japan	Decision (Unanimous)	3	3:00
2020-11-14	Win	(Japan) Taiki Sawatani	RISE 143	Bunkyo, Tokyo, Japan	Decision (Unanimous)	3	3:00
2020-02-23	Win	(Japan) Kensei Yamakawa	RISE 137	Tokyo, Japan	Decision (Unanimous)	3	3:00
2019-11-04	Win	(Japan) Ryuji Horio	RISE 135	Tokyo, Japan	Decision (Unanimous)	3	3:00
2019-07-21	Win	(Japan) Naoki Yamada	RISE WORLD SERIES 2019 Semi-Final Round in OSAKA	Osaka, Japan	Decision (Split)	3	3:00
2019-04-26	Win	(Japan) Teppei Tsuda	RISE EVOL.3	Tokyo, Japan	Decision (Unanimous)	3	3:00
2019-02-03	Win	(Japan) YA-MAN	RISE 130	Tokyo, Japan	Decision (Unanimous)	3	3:00
2018-11-02	Win	(Japan) Hyuma Hitachi	RISE 128	Tokyo, Japan	TKO (Punches)	1	1:53
2018-09-16	Draw	(Japan) Kojiro Flysky Gym	RISE 127	Tokyo, Japan	Decision (Majority)	3	3:00
2018-07-16	Win	(Japan) Masaaki Ono	RISE 126	Tokyo, Japan	KO (Right hook)	3	0:48
Legend: Win Loss Draw/No contest Notes

== Exhibition kickboxing record ==
1 fight	wins	1 loss
By decision	0	1

Date	Result	Opponent	Event	Location	Method	Round	Time
2018-05-26	Loss	(Japan) Tenshin Nasukawa	ABEMA TV "VS Tenshin Nasukawa"	Tokyo, Japan	Decision (Unanimous)	3	2:00

== See also ==
- List of male kickboxers
