= Ryoga Hirano =

Japanese male kickboxer

- Born: 11 May 1999 (age 27); Kurashiki, Japan
- Native name: 平野凌我
- Other names: Okayama's Child
- Height: 170 cm (5 ft 7 in)
- Weight: 57.5 kg (127 lb; 9 st 1 lb)
- Division: Super Flyweight
- Style: Kickboxing
- Stance: Orthodox
- Team: MTS
- Years active: 2019–present

Kickboxing record
- Total: 26
- Wins: 16
- By knockout: 7
- Losses: 9
- By knockout: 2
- Draws: 1

Ryoga Hirano (born 11 May 1999) is a Japanese professional kickboxer who competes in the featherweight division of RISE.

Combat Press ranked him as a top ten super flyweight between February and June 2022.

== Kickboxing career ==
=== Early career ===
Hirano faced Kanta Tabuchi at KING OF SOUL vol.1 on June 16, 2019. The fight was ruled a draw. After beating Tabuchi, Hirano participated in the "Legend of Heroes" tournament, which was held between November 22 and November 24, 2019. Hirano successfully won the semifinal bout against Hoi Fai by decision, but lost a decision in turn to Lee Yelin in the tournament finals. Hirano rebounded from this loss with a second-round knockout victory against Rai at TWO FC on December 12, 2019.

=== RISE ===
Hirano made his RISE debut against Tatsuki Shinotsuka at RISE 137 on February 23, 2020. He lost the fight by a first-round knockout. Shinotsuka forced Hirano to shell up with a flurry of punches, before he floored him with a right knee to the chin.

Hirano faced Teppei Tsuda at Rise EVOL.6 on September 19, 2020. He won the closely contested bout by majority decision. Two of the judges scored the fight 29-29 after the first three rounds were contested, while the third judge scored it 29-28 for Tsuda. After an extra round was fought, Hirano was awarded a 10-9 scorecard by two of the judges, while the third one scored it as an even 10–10 draw.

Hirano faced Taisei Umei, in his third RISE appearance, at Rise 143 on November 14, 2020. Umei won the fight by unanimous decision, with all three judges scoring the fight 29–28 in his favor.

Hirano faced Fumiya at Rise EVOL.7 on January 16, 2021. He won the fight by a third-round technical knockout, after he had knocked Fumiya down thrice by the 2:38 minute mark of the opening round.

Hirano faced Keisuke Monguchi at Rise on Abema 2 on May 15, 2021. He lost the fight by unanimous decision, with scores of 30–29, 30–28 and 30–28.

After suffering his fourth professional loss, Hirano was booked to face YU-YA at Rise World Series 2021 Osaka on July 18, 2021. He won the fight by a first-round knockout, flooring YU-YA with a right hook.

Hirano next faced Shota Tezuka at Rise 152 on October 22, 2021. He won the fight by a second-round technical knockout, stopping Tezuka with leg kicks.

Hirano face the one-time RISE featherweight title challenger Masaki Takeuchi at RISE 154 on January 23, 2022. He achieved his career-best victory, as he beat Takeuchi by unanimous decision, with scores of 29–28, 29-28 and 30–29.

Hirano was booked to face Taisei Umei for the vacant RISE Featherweight title at RISE 156 on March 27, 2022. He lost the fight by majority decision, with scores of 49–49, 49–48 and 48–47.

Hirano faced Taiki Sawatani at RISE 163 on December 10, 2022. He won the fight by unanimous decision, with all three judges scoring the bout 29–28 in his favor. Hirano scored the sole knockdown of the fight in the first round, as he knocked Sawatani down with a right hook.

Hirano faced Kensei Yamakawa at Rizin 43 – Sapporo on June 24, 2023. He lost the bout in the second round via TKO, getting knocked down three times in the round.

Hirano faced Yuta Kunieda for the vacant MAJKF Featherweight tile on March 31, 2024. He won the fight by technical knockout after he sent his opponent down for the fourth time during the second round.

Hirano faced Kaito at Shoot Boxing 2024 act.4 on August 17, 2024. He lost the fight by unanimous decision.

Hirano faced Ryunosuke Omori at RISE 185 on January 25, 2025. He lost the fight by unanimous decision, with scores of 29–28, 30–29 and 29–28.

== Championships and accomplishments ==
=== Professional ===
- Martial Arts Japan Kickboxiong Federation
  - 2024 MAJKF Featherweight Champion
- X-FIGHT
  - 2026 X-FIGHT Feathnerweight Champion

=== Amateur ===
- 2011 Kennokai Amakick -45 kg Championship
- 2012 NEXT LEVEL Chushikoku -50 kg Championship
- 2013 All Japan Jr Kick - 50 kg runner-up

== Fight record ==
Kickboxing record
17 wins (9 (T)KOs), 10 losses, 1 draw, 0 no contests
Date	Result	Opponent	Event	Location	Method	Round	Time
2026-12-05		(Japan) Shoma	KNOCK OUT REBELS SERIES.16	Tokiwa, Fukushima, Japan			
2026-09-20	Win	(Japan) Makoto	KNOCK OUT MX LIVE.2	Tokiwa, Fukushima, Japan	KO (punches)	1	1:48
2026-06-18	Win	(South Korea) Yoon Deok Jae	X-FIGHT	Kurashiki, Japan	KO	1	
Won the vacant X-FIGHT Featherweight title.
2026-04-18	Win	(Japan) Kei	KNOCK OUT.63 SPRING FES in Okinawa	Ginowan, Okinawa, Japan	KO (punches)	2	1:57
2025-11-09	Loss	(Thailand) Khotchasarn FellowGym	TWO FC vol.9	Akashi, Hyōgo, Japan	TKO	2	0:46
2025-06-01	Loss	(Japan) Kakeru	RISE WEST 26	Fukuoka, Japan	Decision (unanimous)	3	3:00
2025-01-25	Loss	(Japan) Ryunosuke Omori	RISE 185	Tokyo, Japan	Decision (unanimous)	3	3:00
2024-08-17	Loss	(Japan) Kaito	Shoot Boxing 2024 act.4	Tokyo, Japan	Decision (unanimous)	3	3:00
2024-03-31	Win	(Japan) Yuta Kunieda	MAJKF KING OF SOUL vol.7	Osaka, Japan	TKO (4 knockdowns)	2	1:30
Won the vacant MAJKF Featherweight title.
2023-12-10	Win	(Japan) Kengo	RISE 174	Tokyo, Japan	KO (left hook)	1	2:33
2023-07-23	Win	(Japan) Hiro Yokono	KING OF SOUL vol.6	Osaka, Japan	Decision (unanimous)	3	3:00
2023-06-24	Loss	(Japan) Kensei Yamakawa	Rizin 43 – Sapporo	Sapporo, Japan	TKO (3 knockdowns)	2	1:22
2022-12-10	Win	(Japan) Taiki Sawatani	RISE 163	Tokyo, Japan	Decision (unanimous)	3	3:00
2022-03-27	Loss	(Japan) Taisei Umei	RISE 156	Tokyo, Japan	Decision (majority)	5	3:00
For the vacant RISE Featherweight title.
2022-01-23	Win	(Japan) Masaki Takeuchi	RISE 154	Tokyo, Japan	Decision (unanimous)	3	3:00
2021-10-22	Win	(Japan) Shota Tezuka	RISE 152	Tokyo, Japan	TKO (leg kicks)	2	1:52
2021-07-18	Win	(Japan) YU-YA	Rise World Series 2021 Osaka	Osaka, Japan	KO (right hook)	1	2:45
2021-05-16	Loss	(Japan) Keisuke Monguchi	Rise on Abema 2	Tokyo, Japan	Decision (unanimous)	3	3:00
2021-01-16	Win	(Japan) Fumiya	Rise EVOL.7	Tokyo, Japan	TKO (three knockdowns)	1	2:38
2020-11-22	Win	(Japan) Kaku Chonbon	KING OF SOUL vol.2	Osaka, Japan	Decision (split)	3	3:00
2020-11-14	Loss	(Japan) Taisei Umei	Rise 143	Tokyo, Japan	Decision (unanimous)	3	3:00
2020-09-19	Win	(Japan) Teppei Tsuda	Rise EVOL.6	Osaka, Japan	Ext. R. decision (majority)	3	3:00
2020-02-23	Loss	(Japan) Tatsuki Shinotsuka	Rise 137	Tokyo, Japan	KO (right knee)	1	1:50
2019-12-22	Win	(Japan) Rai	TWO FC	Kobe, Japan	KO (right hook)	2	2:46
2019-11-24	Loss	(China) Li Yelin	Legend of Heroes, Semifinals	Shenzhen, China	Decision (unanimous)	3	3:00
2019-11-23	Win	(China) Fei Hui	Legend of Heroes, Tournament Quarterfinals	Shenzhen, China	Decision	3	3:00
2019-06-16	Draw	(Japan) Kanta Tabuchi	KING OF SOUL vol.1	Osaka, Japan	Decision	3	3:00
2019-05-19	Win	(Thailand) Kaiyasit Chuwattana		Japan	Decision	3	3:00
Legend: Win Loss Draw/no contest Notes

Amateur kickboxing record
Date	Result	Opponent	Event	Location	Method	Round	Time
2016-04-10	Win	(Japan) Satoshi Kawai	NJKF West Japan YOUNG FIGHT 1st	Osaka, Japan	Decision (majority)	3	2:00
2016-01-31	Win	(Japan) Naoya Nakamura	NEXT☆LEVEL Chushikoku 19	Okayama, Japan	KO	1	
2014-12-07	Win	(Japan) Yuta Masuda	NEXT☆LEVEL Chushikoku 14	Kurashiki, Japan	KO	1	
2014-11-02	Loss	(Japan) Tsukasa Nijo	NJKF 2014 7th	Osaka, Japan	Ext. R. decision (unanimous)	4	2:00
2014-08-10	Win	(Japan) Kei Ishiguro	NJKF: Professional Young Fight x5	Kurashiki, Japan	KO	1	
2014-04-27	Loss	(Japan) Taiki Sawatani	NEXT☆LEVEL Chushikoku 13	Kurashiki, Japan	Decision (unanimous)	2	2:00
For the NEXT LEVEL Chushikoku Junior -60kg title.
2013-05-12	Loss	(Japan) Ryo Sato	DEEP KICK 15	Osaka, Japan	Decision (unanimous)	3	2:00
For the TOP RUN -50kg title.
2013-03-31	Loss	(Japan) Tenshin Nasukawa	2013 All Japan Jr. Kick Tournament, Tournament Finals	Tokyo, Japan	KO (knee)	1	
For the 2013 All Japan Jr Kick -55kg title.
2013-03-31	Win	(Japan) Hiroaki Okae	2013 All Japan Jr. Kick Tournament, Tournament Semifinals	Tokyo, Japan	Decision	2	2:00
2013-03-31	Win	(Japan) Shoya Suzuki	2013 All Japan Jr. Kick Tournament, Tournament Quarterfinals	Tokyo, Japan	Decision	2	2:00
2013-01-13	Win	(Japan) Ryuki Endo	NEXT☆LEVEL Chushikoku 9	Kurashiki, Japan	KO	1	
2012-11-04	Win	(Japan) Renya Ishigami	NJKF: Kick to The Future 8	Kurashiki, Japan	Decision (unanimous)	3	2:00
2012-07-29	Win	(Japan) Kyosuke Nishida	NJKF	Kurashiki, Japan	Decision (unanimous)	3	2:00
Wins the NEXT LEVEL Chushikoku Junior -50kg title.
2012-04-15	Loss	(Japan)	2012 All Japan Jr. Kick Tournament, Quarter Final	Tokyo, Japan	Decision	2	2:00
2012-03-04	Draw	(Japan) Yahiro Kawahigashi	DOUBLE IMPACT 2	Chiba, Japan	Decision (split)	2	2:00
2011-12-24	Win	(Japan) Ko Tee Han	DEEP KICK 9	Osaka, Japan	TKO (punches)	1	0:44
2011-10-23	Loss	(Japan) Ryo Sato	DEEP KICK 8	Osaka, Japan	Decision (unanimous)	3	2:00
For the TOP RUN -45kg title.
2011-07-31	Win	(Japan) Yusuke Yamada	DEEP KICK 7	Osaka, Japan	Decision (unanimous)	2	2:00
2011-04-17	Loss	(Japan) Urakami Shanghai	New Japan Blood 4	Okayama, Japan	Decision (majority)	2	2:00
2011-02-27	Win	(Japan) Yuki Kuremoto	Kennokai Amakick 4, Tournament Finals	Okayama, Japan	Decision (unanimous)	2	2:00
Wins 2011 Kennokai Amakick -45kg title.
2011-02-27	Win	(Japan) Nagisa Nitani	Kennokai Amakick 4, Tournament Semifinals	Okayama, Japan	Decision (unanimous)	2	1:30
2010-10-10	Win	(Japan) Shun Yoriki	Kennokai Amakick 3	Okayama, Japan	KO	2	
2010-07-18	Win	(Japan) Takumi Seki	Kennokai Amakick 2	Okayama, Japan	Decision (unanimous)	2	2:00
2010-04-24	Draw	(Japan) Toki Matsui	Kennokai Amakick 1	Okayama, Japan	Decision (unanimous)	2	2:00
2010-04-24	Draw	(Japan) Tsubasa Yoshikawa	Kennokai Amakick 1	Okayama, Japan	Decision (unanimous)	2	2:00
Legend: Win Loss Draw/no contest Notes

== See also ==
- List of male kickboxers
