= Ryunosuke Omori =

Japanese kickboxer

- Born: 大森隆之介; December 2, 1999 (age 26); Osaka, Japan
- Nickname: Plus Ultra
- Height: 175 cm (5 ft 9 in)
- Weight: 55 kg (121 lb; 8.7 st)
- Style: Karate, Kickboxing
- Stance: Orthodox
- Fighting out of: Osaka, Japan
- Team: EX ARES
- Years active: 2020 - present

Kickboxing record
- Total: 18
- Wins: 14
- By knockout: 6
- Losses: 4
- By knockout: 1

Ryunosuke Omori (Japanese: 大森隆之介, Omori Ryunosuke; born 2 December 1999) is a Japanese kickboxer, currently competing in the super bantamweight division of RISE

As of September 2022 he was the #10 ranked Strawweight kickboxer in the world by Combat Press.

== Kickboxing career ==
Omori made his professional debut against Takaya Nanami at RISE 136 on January 13, 2020. He won the fight by a third-round knockout. Omori faced Keito Asahi at RISE DEAD OR ALIVE 2020 OSAKA on November 1, 2020, in his second appearance with RISE. He won the fight by a first-round knockout.

Omori faced Rikiya at RISE Eldorado 2021 on February 28, 2021. He won the fight by technical knockout, after dropping Rikiya three times by the 2:32 minute mark of the second round. Omori next faced Yosuke at the May 16, 2021, RISE on Abema event. He won the fight by unanimous decision, the first decision victory of his professional career. Two judges scored the bout 30–28 for him, while the third judge scored it 30–29 for him.

Omori participated in the 2021 Cage Kick Championship tournament, held at Shooto 2021 Vol.4 on July 4, 2021. His four-fight winning streak was snapped, as he was defeated in the quarter finals by unanimous decision by Shoa Arii.

After suffering the first loss of his professional career, Omori was booked to face Kanta Tabuchi at Rise World Series Osaka 2 on November 14, 2021. He won the fight by majority decision. Two of the judges scored the bout 30–29 in his favor, while the third judge scored it as an even 29–29 draw.

Omoiri faced Rasta at RISE 157 on April 24, 2022. He won the fight by knockout in the second round.

Omori faced the sixth-ranked RISE super bantamweight contender Yuki Kyotani at RISE World Series Osaka 2022 on August 21, 2022. He won the fight by a second-round knockout, flooring his opponent with a well placed knee to the body.

Omori faced Yugo Kato at RISE 163 on December 10, 2022. He lost the fight by majority decision, with scores of 30–29, 29–28 and 29–29.

Omori faced Koyata Yamada at RISE ELDORADO 2024 on March 17, 2024. He won the fight by a first-round knockout.

Omori challenged the RISE Bantamweight (-55kg) champion Koki Osaki at RISE 181 on August 31, 2024. He lost the fight by way of unanimous decision, with scores of 49–47, 50–47 and 50–46.

Omori faced Ryoga Hirano at RISE 185 on January 25, 2025. He won the fight by unanimous decision, with scores of 29–28, 30–29 and 29–28.

Omori faced the former RISE Bantamweight champion Masahiko Suzuki at RISE 187 on April 19, 2025. He won the fight by unanimous decision, with scores of 29—29, 29—28 and 30—28.

Omori faced the former RISE featherweight champion Taisei Umei at RISE 196 on February 23, 2026.

== Titles and accomplishments ==
=== Amateur ===
- 2019 Japan Cup Selection Tournament -60 kg Winner
- 2019 Dageki Kakutougi Japan Cup -60 kg Champion

== Fight record ==
Professional Kickboxing Record
14 Wins (6 (T)KO's), 4 Losses, 0 Draw, 0 No Contest
Date	Result	Opponent	Event	Location	Method	Round	Time
2026-10-17	Loss	(Japan) Akito Nakashima	RISE 202	Tokyo, Japan	TKO (3 knockdowns)	1	2:30
For the vacant RISE Featherweight Championship.
2026-07-17	Win	(Iraq) Ali Al-Kinani	ONE Friday Fights 162, Lumpinee Stadium	Bangkok, Thailand	Decision (unanimous)	3	3:00
2026-02-23	Win	(Japan) Taisei Umei	RISE 196	Tokyo, Japan	Ext.R Decision (unanimous)	4	3:00
2025-10-19	Win	(Japan) Kakeru	RISE 192	Tokyo, Japan	Decision (unanimous)	3	3:00
2025-04-19	Win	(Japan) Masahiko Suzuki	RISE 187	Tokyo, Japan	Decision (unanimous)	3	3:00
2025-01-25	Win	(Japan) Ryoga Hirano	RISE 185	Tokyo, Japan	Decision (unanimous)	3	3:00
2024-08-31	Loss	(Japan) Koki Osaki	RISE 181	Tokyo, Japan	Decision (unanimous)	5	3:00
For the RISE Bantamweight (-55kg) title.
2024-03-17	Win	(Japan) Koyata Yamada	RISE ELDORADO 2024	Tokyo, Japan	KO (spinning back fist)	1	2:16
2022-12-10	Loss	(Japan) Yugo Kato	RISE 163	Tokyo, Japan	Decision (majority)	3	3:00
2022-08-21	Win	(Japan) Yuki Kyotani	RISE WORLD SERIES OSAKA 2022	Osaka, Japan	KO (knee to the body)	2	1:39
2022-04-24	Win	(Japan) Rasta	RISE 157	Tokyo, Japan	KO (punches)	2	2:38
2021-11-14	Win	(Japan) Kanta Tabuchi	Rise World Series Osaka 2	Osaka, Japan	Decision (majority)	3	3:00
2021-07-04	Loss	(Japan) Shoa Arii	Shooto Cage Kick Championship, Quarter Final	Osaka, Japan	Decision (unanimous)	3	3:00
2021-05-16	Win	(Japan) Yosuke	RISE on ABEMA	Tokyo, Japan	Decision (unanimous)	3	3:00
2021-02-28	Win	(Japan) Rikiya	RISE Eldorado 2021	Yokohama, Japan	TKO (3 knockdowns)	2	2:32
2020-11-01	Win	(Japan) Keito Asahi	RISE DEAD OR ALIVE 2020 OSAKA	Osaka, Japan	KO (spinning back kick to the body)	1	2:34
2020-01-13	Win	(Japan) Takaya Nanami	RISE 136	Tokyo, Japan	KO (right straight)	3	1:17
Legend: Win Loss Draw/No contest Notes

Amateur Kickboxing Record
Date	Result	Opponent	Event	Location	Method	Round	Time
2019-10-27	Win	(Japan) Reo Yoshida	Amateur Dageki Kakutougi Japan Cup 2019, Final	Tokyo, Japan	Decision	2	2:00
Wins 2019 Japan Cup -60kg title.
2019-10-27	Win	(Japan) Ryuki Yamamoto	Amateur Dageki Kakutougi Japan Cup 2019, Semi Final	Tokyo, Japan			
2019-08-04	Win	(Japan) Reo Yoshida	KAMINARIMON, Japan Cup Selection Tournament -60 kg Final	Tokyo, Japan	Decision (majority)	1	2:00
Qualifies to the 2019 Japan Cup -60kg Tournament.
2019-08-04	Win	(Japan) Towa Yamaguchi	KAMINARIMON, Japan Cup Selection Tournament -60 kg Semi Final	Tokyo, Japan	Decision (unanimous)	1	2:00
2019-08-04	Win	(Japan) Kosuke Yano	KAMINARIMON, Japan Cup Selection Tournament -60 kg Quarter Final	Tokyo, Japan	Decision (unanimous)	1	2:00
2019-01-20	Win	(Japan) Ryoga Matsumoto	NEXT☆LEVEL Kansai 53	Sakai, Japan	Decision (unanimous)	2	2:00
2018-12-02	Win	(Japan) Takuma Sudo	KAMINARIMON	Tokyo, Japan	Decision (unanimous)	2	2:00
2018-12-02	Win	(Japan) Sho Ota	KAMINARIMON	Tokyo, Japan	Decision (unanimous)	2	2:00
Legend: Win Loss Draw/No contest Notes

== See also ==
- List of male kickboxers
