= YA-MAN =

Japanese kickboxer

- Born: Ren Sugiyama (杉山 怜); May 31, 1996 (age 30); Fujimi, Saitama, Japan
- Other names: King of Street Fight
- Height: 173 cm (5 ft 8 in)
- Weight: 62.5 kg (138 lb; 9.84 st)
- Stance: Orthodox
- Fighting out of: Shibuya, Tokyo
- Team: TARGET Shibuya
- Years active: 2018–present

Kickboxing record
- Total: 20
- Wins: 15
- By knockout: 8
- Losses: 5
- By knockout: 1

Mixed martial arts record
- Total: 5
- Wins: 2
- By knockout: 2
- Losses: 3
- By decision: 3

Other information
- University: Tokai University

YouTube information
- Channel: 翔んでやーまん
- Years active: 2022–present
- Genre: vlog
- Subscribers: 86.3 thousand
- Views: 16.1 million
- Last updated: 4 September 2024

Ren Sugiyama (Japanese: 杉山 怜, Sugiyama Ren; born May 31, 1996), better known by his ring name YA-MAN, is a Japanese kickboxer, mixed martial artist and YouTuber. He currently competes in the lightweight division of RISE.

Combat Press ranks YA-MAN as the fifth best bantamweight kickboxer in the world, as of July 2022.

== Kickboxing career ==
=== Early career ===
==== RISE Rising Rookie Cup ====
YA-MAN made his professional debut against Taiki Sawatani on the prelims of RISE 122 on February 4, 2018. He won the fight by split decision. Two of the judges scored the bout 30–28 and 30–29 in his favor, while the third judge scored the bout 30–28 for Sawatani.

After successfully winning his first professional fight, YA-MAN was placed in the 2018 RISING Rookies Cup. He was booked to face the winless Kazuyoshi at RISE 124 in the tournament quarterfinals. YA-MAN won the fight by a first-round technical knockout, stopping Kazuyoshi with eight seconds left in the opening round. YA-MAN faced Kosuke Kai in the penultimate bout of the tournament, which was held at RISE 126 on July 16, 2018. He won the fight by split decision, with scores of 29–28, 28–29 and 29–27,

YA-MAN advanced to the tournament finals, held on the prelims of RISE 128 on November 2, 2018, where he faced Taiki Sawatani. The pair previously fought at RISE 122, in YA-MAN's professional debut, with YA-MAN winning by split decision. He was less successful in the rematch, as Sawatani won the fight by unanimous decision, with all three judges awarding him a 29–28 scorecard.

==== Move up in weight ====
YA-MAN faced the undefeated Keisuke Monguchi (2–0–1) at RISE 132 on February 3, 2019. He lost the fight by unanimous decision, with scores of 30–28, 29–28 and 29–27. YA-MAN faced YUU in his sixth and final fight at featherweight at RISE 132 on May 19, 2019. He won the fight by unanimous decision. Two of the judges scored the bout 30–28 in his favor, while the third judge awarded all three of the rounds to YA-MAN.

After amassing a 4–2 record at featherweight, YA-MAN moved up to super featherweight (-60 kg). He was booked to face the 2019 Shinkarate K2 Grand Prix winner Ryota Saito at Stand up Kickboxing Vol.1 on December 22, 2019. YA-MAN knocked Saito down once en-route to winning the fight by unanimous decision, with scores of 29–26, 30–27 and 30–26.

YA-MAN was next booked to face Senichi at Rise 142 on September 4, 2020. The bout was contested at lightweight (-62.5 kg), which represented a 5 kg move up in weight in his last two bouts. He won the fight by unanimous decision, with all three judges awarding him every single round of the fight.

YA-MAN faced the seventh ranked RISE super featherweight contender Taishi Hiratsuka at Rise El Dorado 2021 on February 28, 2021. He lost his first fight on RISE's flagship event series by unanimous decision, with scores of 29–28, 29–28 and 30–28.

=== Rise up the ranks ===
==== YA-MAN vs. Yamaguchi ====
At a press conference held by RISE on April 15, 2021, it was revealed that YA-MAN would face the seventh ranked RISE super-lightweight contender Yuma Yamaguchi at Rise on Abema 2 on June 15, 2021, in an "open finger glove" match. Both fighters competed in MMA gloves under this rule-set, in a three-round three-minute bout. There were no extension rounds, as is normal under the regular RISE rule-set and the fight could only end in knockout or technical knockout, any decision would result in a pre-determined draw. YA-MAN's fight with Yamaguchi was one of two such matches held at the event, with RISE representative Takashi Ito stating he would introduce an OFG belt and rankings, should it prove to be popular enough.

During the press conference, YA-MAN revealed that he had volunteered to fight under this rule-set, although he remained respectful of his opponent, stating: "...I hope Yuma Yamaguchi is coming in with a mentality like 'If I lose to a guy like this [who's only been training for five years], I'm getting weaker, and it's probably best I retire soon'".

YA-MAN had a poor start to the fight, as he was knocked down with a left hook in an exchange after managing to corner Yamaguchi. He continued pressuring when the fight action resumed and was able to rally back in the second round, as he knocked Yamaguchi with a left uppercut to a right hook combination. Yamaguchi was unable to beat the eight-count following the knockdown, forcing the referee to wave the fight off at the 1:53 minute mark. YA-MAN stated his desire to fight the winner of the other OFG bout on the card, between Yuma's brother Hiroto and Yoshimichi Matsumoto.

==== YA-MAN vs. Kitai ====
On August 24, 2021, several additional bouts were announced for Rise World Series 2021 Yokohama, which was scheduled to take place on September 23, 2021. Two of these bouts were "open fingers glove" fights, which saw Hiroto Yamaguchi faced Tatsuya Inaishi and YA-MAN face the second ranked RISE lightweight contender Tomohiro Kitai. The rule-set was slightly tweaked prior to the event taking place: fights which don't end in stoppage would no longer result in a pre-determined draw, but would be judged just the same as a fight which took place under the regular RISE rules. On September 22, the two fighters were engaged in a brief onstage scuffle during the face-offs, in which Kitai initiated physical contact when he shoved YA-MAN.

On fight night, YA-MAN won the fight by a first-round knockout. He knocked his opponent down with a left hook right hook combination, which floored Kitai and left him unable to beat the ten-count. It was the quickest stoppage victory of his career up to that point, as he needed just 43 seconds to knock Kitai out. During his post-fight speech, YA-MAN called out Hiroto Yamaguchi, the brother of his previous opponent Yuma. He furthermore publicly called for an open finger glove tournament to be held by RISE.

==== YA-MAN vs. Nakamura ====
On September 24, 2021, a day after the RISE WORLD SERIES 2021 Yokohama event was held, YA-MAN called out Kan Nakamura over social media. Nakamura had entered the ring following RISE Lightweight champion Naoki Tanaka's non-title bout with Taiju Shiratori at the event and demanded a title fight with Naoki, who however refused, as he felt Nakamura hadn't earned it. YA-MAN felt the same way and instead offered to face Nakamura himself, in an open finger glove match. The fight between YA-MAN and Nakamura was officially announced on October 13. It was scheduled as the featured bout of Rise World Series 2021 Osaka 2, which took place on November 14. YA-MAN kept his undefeated record in OFG bouts, as he won the fight by unanimous decision. Although no fighter was able to knock the other down, YA-MAN was able to win two of the three rounds of all of the judges' scorecards, who scored the bout 29–28 in his favor.

==== YA-MAN vs. Kouzi ====
On November 15, 2021, in a Twitter post, Kouzi named four fighters he wished to face at the Rizin FF New Year's Eve event: Genji Umeno, Taiga, Shibatar and YA-MAN. A day later, YA-MAN accepted the call-out in his own Twitter post. The fight was officially announced on December 20. It was booked for the undercard of Rizin 33, which took place on December 30, 2021, at the Saitama Super Arena in Saitama, Japan. The fight was contested at a 62 kg catchweight in 8 oz gloves under the Rizin kickboxing rule-set. It was YA-MAN's first fight not contested under the "open finger glove" rules since his decision loss to Taishi Hiratsuka on February 28, 2021.

In front of an audience of 22,449 people, YA-MAN won the fight by majority decision. Two of the judges scored the fight 30–29 and 30–28 for him, while the third judge scored the fight as an even 30–30 draw. The bout was briefly stopped in the first round, as Kouzi landed an inadvertent headbutt on YA-MAN. It was later revealed that YA-MAN had donated his entire fight purse to a children’s charity called “Peace Project.”

==== YA-MAN vs. Ito ====
At a press conference held by RISE on March 15, 2022, it was announced that YA-MAN would face Sumiya Ito. The fight was scheduled for the undercard of Rise El Dorado 2022, which took place on April 2, 2022 at the Yoyogi National Gymnasium in Shibuya, Tokyo. YA-MAN claimed that he had tried to arrange a fight with different, more well known opponents, but was refused by all of them. As such, he chose to fight Ito, who was likewise introduced as an "underground fighter".

YA-MAN had a great start to the fight and managed to knock Ito down with a flurry of punches a minute into the round. Ito was however able to beat the ten count and knocked YA-MAN down in turn, with a well placed left straight soon after the action resumed. Immediately after this knockdown, the ringside physician was called in to take a look at a cut above YA-MAN's right eye. The fight was allowed to continue and YA-MAN was able to knock Ito down two additional times, with a right hook and a right uppercut. Under the RISE rules, three knockdowns inside of a single round resulted in a technical knockout victory for YA-MAN.

==== YA-MAN vs. Ashizawa ====
On May 19, 2022, at a joint press conference held by K-1 and RISE, it was announced that YA-MAN would face Ryusei Ashizawa on the undercard of the Tenshin Nasukawa vs Takeru Abema pay-per-view, which took place at the Tokyo Dome on June 18, 2022. The bout would be contested at a 62 kg catchweight, under the RISE rule-set, with both fighters wearing MMA gloves. The two fighters came to blows at the press conference, after Ashizawa had initiated physical contact by kicking YA-MAN. The pair was quickly separated by the security, with YA-MAN being tackled to the ground by one of them. They once again engaged in a scuffle during the pre-fight weigh-ins and once again had to be separated by the security.

In front of a sold-out audience of 56,399 people, YA-MAN won the fight by a first-round knockout. He needed just 109 seconds to stop Ashizawa. YA-MAN knocked his opponent down as soon as the fight started, dropping him with a counter right cross. Although Ashizawa was able to beat the count, he was knocked down for a second time with a left hook soon afterwards, which left him unable to stand up in time. During the post-fight press conference, YA-MAN stated his desire to compete in mixed martial arts by the end of the year.

==== YA-MAN vs. Shiratori ====
Shiratori faced the 2019 RISE lightweight World Series tournament winner and former RISE Lightweight Champion Taiju Shiratori in a super lightweight (-65 kg) bout at RISE World Series 2022 on October 15, 2022. It was the highest weight he had competed at up to that point in his career, with most of his previous fights taking place at lightweight (-62.5 kg). He lost the fight by unanimous decision, with all three judges scoring it 29–28 for Shiratori. The first round was scored as a draw, the second round was scored 10–8 in favor of Shiratori due to a knockdown he scored with a knee strike, while the third and final round was scored 10–9 for YA-MAN. It was later revealed that YA-MAN had broken his nose and bruised several ribs during the fight.

=== RISE OFG Super Lightweight champion ===
YA-MAN was booked to face Hiroto Yamaguchi, whose brother Yuma he beat by a second-round knockout at "Rise on Abema 2" two years prior, for the inaugural RISE Super Lightweight "Open Finger Glove" championship at "RISE World Series 2023 - 2nd Round" on August 26, 2023. Despite suffering a knockdown in the opening round, YA-MAN was able to knock his opponent down four times by the 1:05 minute mark of the second round, which resulted in a technical knockout victory under the RISE rules.

YA-MAN faced the two-time Rizin Featherweight title challenger Mikuru Asakura at the inaugural "Fight Club" event. The fight was contested in open-finger gloves, under kickboxing rules and at the lightweight (-70 kg) limit. He won the fight by a first-round knockout.

YA-MAN faced Miguel Trindade at RISE ELDORADO 2025 on March 29, 2025. He lost the fight by a third-round technical knockout.

== Mixed martial arts career ==
=== Rizin FF ===
YA-MAN made his professional mixed martial arts debut against Kota Miura at Rizin 42 on May 6, 2023, in a special rules bout, which shortened the bout down to two five-minute rounds. He won the fight by a first-round knockout.

YA-MAN faced Ren Hiramoto at Rizin 45 on December 31, 2023, losing the fight by unanimous decision.

YA-MAN is scheduled to face Yutaka Saito on September 10, 2026 at Super Rizin 5.

== Championships and accomplishments ==
=== Professional ===
- RISE
  - 2018 RISE RISING Rookies Cup Runner-up
  - 2023 RISE OFG Super Lightweight (-65kg) Champion

=== Amateur ===
- J-NETWORK
  - 2017 J-NETWORK All Japan Championship -57 kg Winner & Fighting Spirit Award

== Mixed martial arts record ==
Professional record breakdown
6 matches	3 wins	3 losses
By knockout	3	0
By decision	0	3

Res.	Record	Opponent	Method	Event	Date	Round	Time	Location	Notes
Loss	3–3	Yutaka Saito	Decision (unanimous)	Super Rizin 5	September 10, 2026	3	5:00	Osaka, Japan	
Win	3–2	Masanori Kanehara	KO (punches)	Super Rizin 4	July 27, 2025	3	2:51	Saitama, Japan	
Loss	2–2	Karshyga Dautbek	Decision (unanimous)	Rizin 49	December 31, 2024	3	5:00	Saitama, Japan	
Win	2–1	Hiroaki Suzuki	KO (punches)	Super Rizin 3	July 28, 2024	1	3:28	Saitama, Japan	
Loss	1–1	Ren Hiramoto	Decision (unanimous)	Rizin 45	December 31, 2023	3	5:00	Saitama, Japan	
Win	1–0	Kota Miura	KO (knee and punches)	Rizin 42	May 6, 2023	1	3:13	Tokyo, Japan	Featherweight debut. Rizin Special rules (2x5 min).

== Kickboxing record ==
Kickboxing record
14 Wins (7 (T)KO's), 5 Losses, 0 Draw, 0 No Contest
Date	Result	Opponent	Event	Location	Method	Round	Time
2025-03-29	Loss	(Portugal) Miguel Trindade	RISE ELDORADO 2025	Tokyo, Japan	TKO (Corner stoppage)	3	0:43
2023-11-19	Win	(Japan) Mikuru Asakura	Fight Club	Tokyo, Japan	KO (Punches)	1	1:17
2023-08-26	Win	(Japan) Hiroto Yamaguchi	RISE World Series 2023 - 2nd Round	Tokyo, Japan	TKO (4 Knockdowns)	2	1:05
Wins the inaugural RISE OFG Super Lightweight (-65kg) title.
2022-10-15	Loss	(Japan) Taiju Shiratori	RISE WORLD SERIES 2022	Tokyo, Japan	Decision (Unanimous)	3	3:00
2022-06-19	Win	(Japan) Ryusei Ashizawa	THE MATCH 2022	Tokyo, Japan	TKO (Right hook to left hook)	1	1:49
2022-04-02	Win	(Japan) Sumiya Ito	RISE ELDORADO 2022	Tokyo, Japan	TKO (Three knockdown rule)	1	2:33
2021-12-30	Win	(Japan) Kouzi	Rizin 33 - Saitama	Saitama, Japan	Decision (Majority)	3	3:00
2021-11-14	Win	(Japan) Kan Nakamura	RISE World Series 2021 Osaka 2	Osaka, Japan	Decision (Unanimous)	3	3:00
2021-09-23	Win	(Japan) Tomohiro Kitai	RISE World Series 2021 Yokohama	Yokohama, Japan	KO (Right hook)	1	0:43
2021-05-16	Win	(Japan) Yuma Yamaguchi	RISE on Abema 2	Ōta, Tokyo, Japan	KO (Uppercut and hook)	2	1:53
2021-02-28	Loss	(Japan) Taishi Hiratsuka	RISE El Dorado 2021	Yokohama, Japan	Decision (Unanimous)	3	3:00
2020-09-04	Win	(Japan) Senichi	RISE 142	Tokyo, Japan	Decision (Unanimous)	3	3:00
2019-12-22	Win	(Japan) Ryota Saito	Stand up Kickboxing Vol.1	Tokyo, Japan	Decision (Unanimous)	3	3:00
2019-05-19	Win	(Japan) Yu Kato	RISE 132	Tokyo, Japan	Decision (Unanimous)	3	3:00
2019-02-03	Loss	(Japan) Keisuke Monguchi	RISE 130	Tokyo, Japan	Decision (Unanimous)	3	3:00
2018-11-02	Loss	(Japan) Taiki Sawatani	RISE 128, Tournament Final	Tokyo, Japan	Decision (Unanimous)	3	3:00
For the 2018 RISE RISING Rookies Cup.
2018-07-16	Win	(Japan) Kosuke Kai	RISE 126, Tournament Semifinal	Tokyo, Japan	Decision (Split)	3	3:00
2018-05-25	Win	(Japan) Kazuyoshi	RISE 124, Tournament Quarterfinal	Tokyo, Japan	TKO (Referee stoppage)	1	2:52
2018-02-04	Win	(Japan) Taiki Sawatani	RISE 122	Tokyo, Japan	Decision (Split)	3	3:00
Legend: Win Loss Draw/No contest Notes

=== Amateur record ===
Amateur Kickboxing & Muay Thai record
Date	Result	Opponent	Event	Location	Method	Round	Time
2017-10-09	Loss	(Japan) Kento Haraguchi	Dageki Kakutougi Japan Cup, Semifinals	Tokyo, Japan	Decision		
2017-10-09	Win	(Japan)	Dageki Kakutougi Japan Cup, Quarterfinals	Tokyo, Japan			
2017-08-06	Win	(Japan) Shun Shiraishi	KAMINARIMON - Japan Cup Selection, Final	Tokyo, Japan	Decision (Unanimous)	3	2:00
2017-06-04	Win	(Japan) Madoki Tanaka	KAMINARIMON & RISE ZERO	Tokyo, Japan	Decision (Unanimous)	3	2:00
2017-03-19	Win	(Japan) Sean Mizoguchi	J-NETWORK Amateur All Japan Championship, Tournament Finals	Tokyo, Japan	Decision (Unanimous)	2	2:00
Wins the J-NETWORK Amateur All Japan Championship.
2017-03-19	Win	(Japan) Jun Matsuzaki	J-NETWORK Amateur All Japan Championship, Tournament Semifinals	Tokyo, Japan	Ext. R. Decision (Split)	3	2:00
2017-03-19	Win	(Japan) Hiroki Suzuki	J-NETWORK Amateur All Japan Championship, Tournament Quarterfinals	Tokyo, Japan	Decision (Unanimous)	2	2:00
2016-12-11	Loss	(Japan) Kosuke Kai	KAMINARIMON All Japan Championship, Tournament, Tournament Semifinals	Tokyo, Japan	Decision (Unanimous)	2	2:00
2016-12-11	Win	(Japan) Takuya Aragaki	KAMINARIMON All Japan Championship, Tournament Quarterfinals	Tokyo, Japan	TKO	2	
2016-10-09	Loss	(Japan) Kyosuke Takahashi	KAMINARIMON	Tokyo, Japan	Decision (Split)	3	2:00
2016-06-19	Win	(Japan) Shohei Kuroki	UKF 84th All Japan Student Kickboxing Championship	Tokyo, Japan	Decision (Majority)	3	2:00
2016-03-13	Win	(Japan) Hiroyuki Goto	MuayThai Super Fight Suk Wan Kingthong vol.4	Tokyo, Japan	Decision	2	1:30
2014-10-11	Win	(Japan) Hiroki Adachi	UKF 29th Rookie Battle	Tokyo, Japan	Decision (Unanimous)	2	2:00
Legend: Win Loss Draw/No contest Notes

== See also ==
- List of male kickboxers
