= Taiga Kawabe =

Japanese kickboxer

Taiga
- Born: Taiga Kawabe (河部 大雅); August 14, 1996 (age 30); Aikawa, Kanagawa Prefecture
- Other names: Hypernova
- Height: 166 cm (5 ft 5 in)
- Weight: 60.0 kg (132.3 lb; 9.45 st)
- Division: Bantamweight; Super Bantamweight
- Style: Kickboxing, karate
- Stance: Southpaw
- Fighting out of: Tokyo, Japan
- Team: TRY HARD GYM (2012-2020, 2022-); Team Dragon (2021); Reversal Yokohama Grand Slam (2024-)
- Years active: 2012 - present

Kickboxing record
- Total: 45
- Wins: 30
- By knockout: 6
- Losses: 13
- By knockout: 6
- Draws: 2

Other information
- Notable relatives: Hiroya (elder brother)

Taiga Kawabe is a Japanese kickboxer, currently signed with RISE, where he is the former RISE Super Featherweight (-60kg) champion. He is the former Krush Super Bantamweight and K-1 Super Featherweight champion, as well as a two-time K-1 Grand Prix runner-up.

Taiga is the younger brother of Hiroya, who inspired him along with the two time K-1 Max World Champion Masato to start practicing Karate in his childhood, becoming a Black Belt at the fifth grade.

He was ranked as a top ten bantamweight in the world by Combat Press between April 2018 and January 2019.

== Kickboxing career ==
=== Early career ===
Taiga made his professional debut against Ryota at Krush-EX 2012 vol.6, winning by a third-round TKO. He won his next three fights by unanimous decision, before participating in the Krush Youth Super Bantamweight Grand Prix. He won the tournament with a split decision against Namito Izawa in the semifinals and a unanimous decision against Ryuji Horio in the finals.

After an extra round decision win against Yuya Suzuki at Krush.41, Taiga won the Krush Super Bantamweight title with a unanimous decision victory over Shota Takiya.

=== K-1 ===
==== Early K-1 career ====
Taiga made his K-1 debut against Takeru Segawa at the K-1 World GP 2014 -65kg Championship Tournament event. Taiga lost the fight by a spinning backfist knockout. It was both the first loss and the first knockout loss of his career.

Immediately following this loss, Taiga was scheduled to take part in the K-1 Super Bantamweight Grand Prix, to crown the inaugural champion. He defeated Soufiane El Haji by unanimous decision in the quarterfinals and Nobuchika Terado by a third-round knockout in the semifinals. In a rematch with Takeru Segawa in the tournament finals, Taiga once again came up short, losing by unanimous decision.

At K-1 World GP 2015 The Championship, Taiga fought the future Krush Super Featherweight champion Leona Pettas. Pettas won the fight by a majority decision. Returning to Krush, Taiga bounced back from this losing skid with a second-round knockout of Taishi Hiratsuka.

==== K-1 Super Featherweight tournament ====
Taiga took part in the K-1 World GP 2016 -60kg Japan Tournament. He scored a first-round flying knee knockout of Masahiro Yamamoto in the quarterfinals, and a first-round left-hook knockout of Toshi in the semifinals. Taiga won the tournament with a unanimous decision win against Koya Urabe.

Winning this tournament earned him a place in the K-1 World GP 2016 -60kg Japan Tournament. He won his quarterfinal bout against Javier Hernández by TKO, after his opponent retired at the end of the second round. He beat Hirotaka Urabe by unanimous decision in the semifinals. Taiga fought a rematch with Koya Urabe in the tournament finals, and lost by TKO, after being knocked down three times inside of the first 90 seconds.

==== K-1 title reign ====
After beating Chen Wende at the Wu Lin Feng 2016: WLF x Krush - China vs Japan event, Taiga was given the chance to challenge Hirotaka Urabe for the K-1 Super Featherweight title. He beat Urabe by unanimous decision.

Four months after winning the title, Taiga was scheduled to fight Koji in a non-title bout. He won the fight by unanimous decision.

In his last fight with the promotion, Taiga was scheduled to fight Stavros Exakoustidis. Exakoustidis won the fight by a first-round knockout.

Moving away from K-1, Taiga participated in the Kunlun Fight 74 61.5 kg Tournament, being scheduled to fight Lin Qiangbang in the quarterfinals. Qiangbang won the fight by majority decision.

=== RIZIN ===
Taiga made his promotional debut with RIZIN against Kento Haraguchi at Rizin 13. The fight ended in a draw.

Taiga would lose his next two fights to Zhu Xu at Emei Legend 36 by majority decision, and to Saeksan Or. Kwanmuang at Rise by unanimous decision.

Kawabe was scheduled to fight Thalisson Gomes Ferreira at Rizin 15. Taiga once again lost, after being knocked down three times inside of the second round.

His third appearance for RIZIN was at Rizin 17, when he was scheduled to fight Hikaru Machida. Taiga managed to beat Machida by unanimous decision.

After his first victory in over two years, Taiga was scheduled to fight the former RISE Lightweight champion Taiju Shiratori at Rizin 19. Shiratori won the fight by unanimous decision. The two of them fought an immediate rematch at Rizin 20. Shiratori once again won, this time by TKO, as Taiga was unable to continue after the second round due to a cut.

Taiga was next scheduled to fight the reigning RISE Lightweight champion Kento Haraguchi at Rizin 23. Taiga lost the fight by a first-round knockout.

Following these three losses, Taiga was scheduled to fight Yuma Yamahata at Rizin 25. He snapped the second losing streak of his career with a unanimous decision victory over Yamahata.

Taiga was next scheduled to fight Kanta Motoyama at Rizin 27. He dominated throughout the three rounds and won a unanimous decision.

=== RISE ===
Taiga was scheduled to fight Kan Nakamura at RISE WORLD SERIES 2021 on July 18, 2021. He lost the fight by majority decision.

Taiga was scheduled to face Genji Umeno at RISE World Series 2021 Osaka 2 on November 14, 2021. He won the fight by unanimous decision.

Taiga was booked to face Ryo Takahashi at Rizin 34 – Osaka on March 20, 2022. The bout was ruled a majority decision draw.

Taiga faced Soichiro Arata at Rizin 36 – Okinawa on July 2, 2022. He won the fight by unanimous decision, with all three judges scoring the fight 30–24 in his favor, as he had knocked Arata down in every round of the bout.

Taiga faced Shota Okudeira in a super featherweight (-60 kg) bout at RISE World Series 2022 on October 15, 2022. The fight was ruled a split decision draw after the first three rounds, with one scorecard of 30–28 for Okudeira and one scorecard of 30–29 for Taiga, while the third judge had it as an even 30–30 draw. Taiga was awarded a unanimous decision following an extra fourth round.

Taiga was expected to face Kazuma at RISE EL DORADO 2023 on March 26, 2023. The fight was cancelled following the official weigh-ins, due to Taiga's poor physical condition.

Taiga faced Fares Oumahamed at MTGP Impact in Paris on June 24, 2023. Oumahamed later withdrew with an injury and was replaced by Paul Karpowicz. Taiga won the fight by a third-round knockout.

Taiga faced the one-time RISE Super Featherweight title challenger Hyuma Hitachi at RISE World Series 2023 - 2nd Round on August 26, 2023. He won the fight by unanimous decision, after an extra fourth round was contested.

Taiga challenged the RISE Super Featherweight champion Chan Hyung Lee at RISE 175 on January 14, 2024. He won the fight by unanimous decision, with scores of 50–49, 50–48 and 50–47.

Taiga faced Daniel Puertas at RISE WORLD SERIES 2024 OSAKA on June 15, 2024. He won the fight by unanimous decision, with scores of 30–28, 30–28 and 30–29.

Taiga vacated the RISE Super Featherweight title on January 21, 2025, in order to focus on his mixed martial arts career.

== Mixed martial arts career ==
Taiga faced Pungluang Banramba in an Unlimited Rules bout at KNOCK OUT.60 on December 30, 2025. Under the ruleset, takedowns and ground striking were permitted, while chokes and joint locks were prohibited. He won the fight by a first-round knockout.

== Titles and accomplishments ==
- RISE
  - 2024 RISE Super Featherweight (-60kg) Champion
- K-1
  - 2017 K-1 -60 kg World Champion
  - 2016 K-1 World GP 2016 -60kg World Tournament runner-up
  - 2016 K-1 -60kg Japan Tournament Champion
  - 2015 K-1 World GP -55kg Championship Tournament runner-up
- Krush
  - 2014 Krush Super Bantamweight Champion
  - 2013 Krush Youth GP -55 kg Tournament Champion

Awards

- eFight.jp
  - 2x Fighter of the Month (April 2016, January 2024)

== Mixed martial arts record ==
Professional record breakdown
2 matches	0 wins	2 losses
By decision	0	2

Res.	Record	Opponent	Method	Event	Date	Round	Time	Location	Notes
Loss	0–2	Shogo Kuriaki	Decision (unanimous)	Super Rizin 4	July 27, 2025	3	5:00	Saitama, Japan	Catchweight (137 lb) bout.
Loss	0–1	Genji Umeno	Decision (unanimous)	Rizin 49	December 31, 2024	3	5:00	Saitama, Japan	Bantamweight debut.

== Custom rules record ==
Professional record breakdown
2 matches	2 wins	0 losses
By knockout	2	0

Res.	Record	Opponent	Method	Event	Date	Round	Time	Location	Notes
Win	2–0	Hikaru Fukunaga	TKO (body knee)	KNOCK OUT.65 ～THE KNOCK OUT 2026～	June 21, 2026	2	2:25	Tokyo, Japan	Catchweight (136 lb) bout. Knock out Unlimited rules
Win	1–0	Pungluang Banramba	KO (left cross)	KNOCK OUT.60 ～K.O CLIMAX 2025～	December 30, 2025	1	2:37	Tokyo, Japan	Catchweight (136 lb) bout. Knock out Unlimited rules

== Kickboxing record ==
Kickboxing record
30 wins (6 (T)KOs), 13 losses, 2 draws, 0 no contests
Date	Result	Opponent	Event	Location	Method	Round	Time
2024-06-15	Win	(Spain) Daniel Puertas	RISE WORLD SERIES 2024 OSAKA	Osaka, Japan	Decision (unanimous)	3	3:00
2024-01-14	Win	(South Korea) Chan Hyung Lee	RISE 175	Tokyo, Japan	Decision (unanimous)	5	3:00
Wins the RISE Super Featherweight (-60kg) title.
2023-08-26	Win	(Japan) Hyuma Hitachi	RISE World Series 2023 - 2nd Round	Tokyo, Japan	Ext.R decision (unanimous)	4	3:00
2023-06-24	Win	(United Kingdom) Paul Karpowicz	MTGP Impact in Paris	Paris, France	Decision (unanimous)	3	3:00
2022-10-15	Win	(Japan) Shota Okudaira	RISE WORLD SERIES 2022	Tokyo, Japan	Ext.R decision (unanimous)	4	3:00
2022-07-02	Win	(Japan) Soichiro Arata	Rizin 36 – Okinawa	Okinawa, Japan	Decision (unanimous)	3	3:00
2022-03-20	Draw	(Japan) Ryo Takahashi	Rizin 34 – Osaka	Osaka, Japan	Decision (majority)	3	3:00
2021-11-14	Win	(Japan) Genji Umeno	RISE World Series 2021 Osaka 2	Osaka, Japan	Decision (unanimous)	3	3:00
2021-07-18	Loss	(Japan) Kan Nakamura	RISE WORLD SERIES 2021	Osaka, Japan	Decision (majority)	3	3:00
2021-03-21	Win	(Japan) Kanta Motoyama	Rizin 27 – Nagoya	Nagoya, Japan	Decision (unanimous)	3	3:00
2020-11-21	Win	(Japan) Yuma Yamahata	Rizin 25 – Osaka	Osaka, Japan	Decision (unanimous)	3	3:00
2020-08-10	Loss	(Japan) Kento Haraguchi	Rizin 23 – Yokohama	Yokohama, Japan	KO (punches)	1	2:50
2019-12-31	Loss	(Japan) Taiju Shiratori	Rizin 20 - Saitama	Saitama, Japan	TKO (doctor stoppage/cut)	2	3:00
2019-10-12	Loss	(Japan) Taiju Shiratori	Rizin 19 - Osaka	Osaka, Japan	Decision (unanimous)	3	3:00
2019-07-27	Win	(Japan) Hikaru Machida	Rizin 17 - Saitama	Saitama, Japan	Decision (unanimous)	3	3:00
2019-04-21	Loss	(Brazil) Thalisson Gomes Ferreira	Rizin 15 - Yokohama	Yokohama, Japan	TKO (3 knockdowns rule)	2	2:34
2019-03-10	Loss	(Thailand) Saeksan Or. Kwanmuang	Rise World Series 2019 First Round	Tokyo, Japan	Decision (unanimous)	3	3:00
2019-01-12	Loss	(China) Zhu Xu	Emei Legend 36	China	Decision (majority)	3	3:00
2018-09-30	Draw	(Japan) Kento Haraguchi	Rizin 13 - Saitama	Saitama, Japan	Decision	3	3:00
2018-05-13	Loss	(China) Lin Qiangbang	Kunlun Fight 74 61.5 kg Tournament, Quarter Finals	China	Decision (majority)	3	3:00
2017-09-18	Loss	(Greece) Stavros Exakoustidis	K-1 World GP 2017 Welterweight Championship Tournament	Tokyo, Japan	KO (3 knockdowns/left hook)	1	2:41
2017-06-18	Win	(Japan) Koji	K-1 World GP 2017 Super Welterweight Championship Tournament	Tokyo, Japan	Decision (unanimous)	3	3:00
2017-02-25	Win	(Japan) Hirotaka Urabe	K-1 World GP 2017 Lightweight Championship Tournament	Tokyo, Japan	Decision (unanimous)	3	3:00
Wins the K-1 World GP 2016 -60kg World Title.
2016-12-03	Win	(China) Chen Wende	Wu Lin Feng 2016: WLF x Krush - China vs Japan	Zhengzhou, China	Decision (unanimous)	3	3:00
2016-09-19	Loss	(Japan) Koya Urabe	K-1 World GP 2016 -60kg World Tournament, Final	Tokyo, Japan	KO (3 knockdowns/left cross)	1	1:30
For the K-1 World GP 2016 -60kg World Tournament.
2016-09-19	Win	(Japan) Hirotaka Urabe	K-1 World GP 2016 -60kg World Tournament, Semi Finals	Tokyo, Japan	Decision (unanimous)	3	3:00
2016-09-19	Win	(Spain) Javier Hernández	K-1 World GP 2016 -60kg World Tournament, Quarter Finals	Tokyo, Japan	TKO (retirement)	2	3:00
2016-04-24	Win	(Japan) Koya Urabe	K-1 World GP 2016 -60kg Japan Tournament, Final	Tokyo, Japan	Decision (unanimous)	3	3:00
Wins the K-1 -60kg Japan Championship.
2016-04-24	Win	(Japan) Toshi	K-1 World GP 2016 -60kg Japan Tournament, Semi Finals	Tokyo, Japan	KO (left hook)	1	0:54
2016-04-24	Win	(Japan) Masahiro Yamamoto	K-1 World GP 2016 -60kg Japan Tournament, Quarter Finals	Tokyo, Japan	KO (left flying knee)	1	1:48
2016-02-05	Win	(Japan) Taishi Hiratsuka	Krush.63	Tokyo, Japan	KO (Left Hook)	2	2:46
2015-11-21	Loss	(Japan) Leona Pettas	K-1 World GP 2015 The Championship	Tokyo, Japan	Decision (majority)	3	3:00
2015-04-19	Loss	(Japan) Takeru	K-1 World GP 2015 -55kg Championship Tournament, Final	Tokyo, Japan	Decision (unanimous)	3	3:00
For the K-1 -55kg World Championship.
2015-04-19	Win	(Japan) Nobuchika Terado	K-1 World GP 2015 -55kg Championship Tournament, Semi Finals	Tokyo, Japan	KO (right hook)	3	2:40
2015-04-19	Win	(Morocco) Soufiane El Haji	K-1 World GP 2015 -55kg Championship Tournament, Quarter Finals	Tokyo, Japan	Decision (unanimous)	3	3:00
2014-11-03	Loss	(Japan) Takeru	K-1 World GP 2014 -65kg Championship Tournament	Tokyo, Japan	KO (spinning back fist)	3	0:13
2014-08-24	Win	(Japan) Shota Takiya	Krush.45	Nagoya, Japan	Decision (unanimous)	3	3:00
Wins the Krush Super Bantamweight Belt.
2014-05-11	Win	(Japan) Yuya Suzuki	Krush.41	Tokyo, Japan	Ext.R decision (unanimous)	3	3:00
2013-12-14	Win	(Japan) Ryuji Horio	Krush.35 - Youth Grand Prix, Final	Tokyo, Japan	Decision (unanimous)	3	3:00
Wins the 2013 Krush Youth Grand Prix -55kg title.
2013-10-13	Win	(Japan) Namito Izawa	Krush-IGNITION 2013 vol.6 - Youth Grand Prix, Semi Finals	Tokyo, Japan	Ext.R decision (split)	4	3:00
2013-10-13	Win	(Japan) Masahiro	Krush-IGNITION 2013 vol.6 - Youth Grand Prix, Quarter Finals	Tokyo, Japan	Ext.R decision (unanimous)	4	3:00
2013-09-01	Win	(Japan) Hiraoka Seiji	J-NETWORK "J-FIGHT SHINJUKU vol.32"	Tokyo, Japan	Decision (unanimous)	3	3:00
2013-06-16	Win	(Japan) Yoshiki	Krush.29	Tokyo, Japan	Decision (unanimous)	3	3:00
2013-03-20	Win	(Japan) Keisuke Ishida	Krush.27	Tokyo, Japan	Decision (unanimous)	3	3:00
2012-11-23	Win	(Japan) Ryota	Krush-EX 2012 vol.6	Tokyo, Japan	TKO (3 knockdowns/left high kick)	3	1:20
Legend: Win Loss Draw/no contest Notes

Amateur kickboxing record
Date	Result	Opponent	Event	Location	Method	Round	Time
2012-06-03	Win	(Japan) Rasta Kido	BigBang Amateur 6	Tokyo, Japan	Decision (unanimous)	2	1:30
2012-03-11	Win	(Japan) Daisuke Hirano	KAMINARIMON	Tokyo, Japan	KO	2	
2011-12-18	Win	(Japan) Sho Oota	KAMINARIMON	Tokyo, Japan	Decision (unanimous)	2	1:30
Legend: Win Loss Draw/no contest Notes

== See also ==
- List of male kickboxers
