= Genji Umeno =

Japanese kickboxer

- Born: December 13, 1988 (age 37); Tokyo, Japan
- Other names: ヤバいだろ
- Nationality: Japanese
- Height: 180 cm (5 ft 11 in)
- Weight: 61.0 kg (134.5 lb; 9.61 st)
- Division: Bantamweight; Super Bantamweight
- Style: Muay Thai
- Stance: Orthodox
- Fighting out of: Tokyo, Japan
- Team: Phoenix Kickboxing & Muay Thai
- Years active: 2007–present

Kickboxing record
- Total: 71
- Wins: 51
- By knockout: 24
- Losses: 15
- By knockout: 5
- Draws: 4
- No contests: 1

Genji Umeno (梅野 源治) is a Japanese Muay Thai and Kickboxing practitioner. He is the current BoM Lightweight champion.

He is a former Rajadamnern 135 lbs champion, WPMF World Super Featherweight champion, WBC Muaythai World, International Super Featherweight champion, as well as a former M-1 Featherweight champion.

== Career beginnings ==
Genji Umeno grew up watching combat sports as a kid, which led him to become enthralled by the sport. When he first started his training at a young age, Umeno thought he would be world champion easily, only to realize how good he would have to be. Umeno says he kept working at his skills to become the best he could be.

Umeno says he doesn't really have many hobbies outside of fighting and training.

== Muay Thai career ==
=== Winning his first titles ===
Umeno made his professional debut in November 2007, against Hiroaki, winning by decision. Umeno was undefeated in his next eight fights, defeating Hiro, Okami and Hari Nagata by decision and Takaaki Sugano, Meechok Manopganchan, Yusuke Miho, Shinjin and Rajasaklek Sor Vorapin by (T)KO. He suffered his first professional loss to Norasing Kiatpurasanchai at REBELS 2, losing by decision. He rebounded from this loss with a second-round TKO of Yotonyot Ketsiripat. His 10–1 record earned him the chance to fight Yu Saenchaigym for the WPMF Japan Super Bantamweight title at REBELS 3. He won the fight by unanimous decision.

In his next fight, in September 2010, Umeno fought Egkarat for the WBC Muay Thai Japan Super Bantamweight title. He fought his third title fight in a row when he fought Kompayak Weerasakreck for the M-1 Featherweight title. He beat Kompayak by majority decision.

Umeno fought his next three fights with the REBELS organization, defeating Yuya Kiyokawa and Suwannoi Acegym by unanimous decision, and Kaichon Sit Tamsap by a third round low kick knockout. Moving to M-1, Umeno fought Wuttidet Lookprabat, defeating him by a fourth-round knockout. In November 2011, Genji fought Dekkamon Hiraigym for the WPMF World Super Featherweight title, and won by a first-round TKO. This victory was followed by a unanimous decision win against Yosuke Morii.

=== Lumpinee title fight ===
In his next fight, Umeno made his Lumpinee Stadium debut, fighting Kongnapa Sirimongkol. Kongnapa would win their fight by unanimous decision. He won his next two fights, before making his K-1 debut as well, being scheduled to fight Chan Hyung Lee. He lost the fight by decision. He rebounded by winning his next three fights, one of them being a rematch with Chan Hyung Lee at RISE 92. Following these three wins, Umeno went on a 2–1 run, that nonetheless earned him the chance to fight Stephen Meleady for the WBC Muay Thai International Super Featherweight title. He defeated Meleady by unanimous decision.

After drawing with the former Lumpini Stadium champion Singtongnoi Por.Telakun, he was scheduled to fight Jompichit Chuwattana for the WBC Muaythai World Super Featherweight title. He won the fight by unanimous decision.

After defeating Rungrat Naratrikul at NO KICK, NO LIFE 2015, Umeno was scheduled to fight Phetmorakot Wor Sangprapai for the prestigious Lumpinee Stadium 130 lbs title. Phetmorakot successfully defended his title through a decision win.

=== Rajadamnern title win ===
After failing to capture the title, Umeno went on the worst run of his career up to that point, going on a 5-3-2 run, losing both of his Rajadamnern Stadium fights. Following this run, he was scheduled to defend his WBC Muaythai title again Keith McLachlan. He defended the title with a second-round TKO.

After defending his title, Umeno was scheduled to fight Yodlekpet Or. Pitisak at REBELS.46 for the Rajadamnern 135 lbs title. Umeno won the most prestigious title of his career through a unanimous decision.

Following this title capture, Umeno won his next two fights, winning decision against Sirimongkol PKsaenchaimuaythaigym and Juan Mario Kaewsamrit. His eight fight undefeated streak was snapped by Rodlek Jaotalaytong at KNOCK OUT vol.2, as Rodlek won a majority decision. After losing to Rodlek, Umeno was scheduled to defend the Rajadamnern title against Sakmongkol Sor.Sommai. Sakmongkol won the fight by unanimous decision.

Umeno rebounded from this loss by defeating Suarek Rukkukamui and Inseetong Por.Phinaphat, before challenging Kulabdam Sor.Jor.Piek-U-Thai for the Lumpinee Stadium 135 lbs title at Rebels 54. Kulabdam won the fight, knocking Genji out in the fourth round.

=== RISE tournament and BoM title ===
In his next two fights, Umeno defeated Pinphet Sitjadaeng and Piëtro Doorjé, before dropping a majority decision to Kiatpet Peekmairestaurant, rebounding with a three fight winning streak during which he beat Jeong Kihan, Lu Jun and Gyudong Lee. He then entered the 2019 Rise World Series Super Featherweight tournament. In the semifinals, Umeno faced Chan Hyung Lee, whom he defeated by unanimous decision. In the finals, he fought Taiju Shiratori, and lost by knockout in the first round.

After losing the tournament finals, Umeno fought Sila YZD for the Battle of Muay Thai lightweight title. Umeno won the title with a first-round TKO of Sila.

Umeno next fought Norasing Specialgym at RISE Eldorado 2021. He won the fight by unanimous decision.

Umeno was scheduled to make the first defense of his BOM Lightweight title against Kiewsongsang Flyskygym, at BOM WAVE 04. The fight was a rematch, with Kiewsongsang winning their first fight at BOM WAVE03. He won the fight by unanimous decision.

Umeno faced Koji in the semifinal bout of a four-man tournament, held during the Rizin 29 – Osaka event. Leading into the fight with Kouzi, Umeno says his Thai boxing experience would not play a factor due to the rule differences between Muay Thai and kickboxing. 43 seconds into his fight with Koji, there was an inadvertent clash of heads which left Umeno unable to continue fighting. Umeno later revealed that he had suffered a broken nose due to the head clash.

Umeno was scheduled to face Lompet Y'zd at BOM – ouroboros 2021 – on September 26, 2021. He fight was ruled a majority draw.

Umeno was scheduled to face Taiga Kawabe at RISE World Series Osaka 2 on November 14, 2021. He lost the fight by unanimous decision.

Umeno fought a rematch with Kouzi at Rizin 34 – Osaka on March 20, 2022. He lost the fight by majority decision.

Umeno faced Trent Girdham in a kickboxing bout at Rizin 39 on October 23, 2022. He won the bout early in the first round after Girdham went down with a knee injury.

Umeno faced Hiroki Suzuki at Rizin 43 – Sapporo on June 24, 2023. He lost the bout via flying knee in the second round.

Umeno faced Yuto Saito at Rizin Landmark 6 on October 1, 2023, winning the bout via majority decision.

Umeno faced Mamoru Uoi at Rizin 47 on June 9, 2024, winning the bout via unanimous decision.

== Titles and accomplishments ==
=== Kickboxing ===
- RISE
  - 2019 RISE World Series -61 kg Tournament Runner-up

=== Muay Thai ===
- The Battle of MuayThai
  - 2019 BoM Lightweight Champion
- Rajadamnern Stadium
  - 2016 Rajadamnern Stadium 135 lbs Champion
- World Boxing Council Muaythai
  - 2010 WBC Muay Thai Japan Bantamweight Champion
  - 2014 WBC Muay Thai World Super Featherweight Champion
  - 2014 WBC Muay Thai International Super Featherweight Champion
- World Professional Muaythai Federation
  - 2011 WPMF World Super Featherweight Champion
- M-1 Muay Thai
  - 2010 M-1 Featherweight Champion

Awards

- eFight.jp
  - 2x Fighter of the Month (September 2011, April 2012)

== Mixed martial arts record ==
Professional record breakdown
4 matches	2 wins	2 losses
By submission	0	1
By decision	2	1

Res.	Record	Opponent	Method	Event	Date	Round	Time	Location	Notes
Loss	2–2	Shoji Maruyama	Decision (unanimous)	Rizin Landmark 15	July 18, 2026	3	5:00	Hiroshima, Japan	Catchweight (141 lb) bout.
Loss	2–1	Daiki Tsubota	Submission (triangle choke)	Rizin 53	May 10, 2026	1	2:37	Kobe, Japan	
Win	2–0	Ryusei Ashizawa	Decision (unanimous)	Rizin 51	September 28, 2025	3	5:00	Nagoya, Japan	
Win	1–0	Taiga Kawabe	Decision (unanimous)	Rizin 49	December 31, 2024	3	5:00	Saitama, Japan	Bantamweight debut.

== Muay Thai and Kickboxing record ==
Kickboxing & Muay Thai record
51 Wins (24 (T)KO's), 15 Losses, 4 Draw, 1 No Contest
Date	Result	Opponent	Event	Location	Method	Round	Time
2024-06-09	Win	(Japan) Mamoru Uoi	Rizin 47	Tokyo, Japan	Decision (Unanimous)	3	3:00
2023-10-01	Win	(Japan) Yuto Saito	Rizin Landmark 6	Nagoya, Japan	Decision (Majority)	3	3:00
2023-06-24	Loss	(Japan) Hiroki Suzuki	Rizin 43 – Sapporo	Sapporo, Japan	KO (Flying knee)	2	2:43
2022-10-23	Win	(Australia) Trent Girdham	Rizin 39	Fukuoka, Japan	TKO (Knee Injury)	1	0:21
2022-07-23	Win	(Japan) Shoji Otani	KNOCK OUT 2022 vol.4	Tokyo, Japan	TKO (Doctor stoppage)	3	2:57
2022-03-20	Loss	(Japan) Kouzi	Rizin 34 – Osaka	Tokyo, Japan	Decision (Majority)	3	3:00
2021-11-14	Loss	(Japan) Taiga	RISE World Series 2021 Osaka 2	Osaka, Japan	Decision (Unanimous)	3	3:00
2021-09-26	Draw	(Thailand) Lompet Y'zd	BOM – ouroboros 2021 –	Tokyo, Japan	Decision	5	3:00
2021-06-27	NC	(Japan) Kouzi	Rizin 29 – Osaka, Tournament Semifinal	Osaka, Japan	Doctor stop. (Head clash)	1	
2021-04-11	Win	(Thailand) Kiewsongsang Flyskygym	BOM WAVE 04 – Get Over The COVID-19	Yokohama, Japan	Decision (Unanimous)	5	3:00
Defends Battle of Muay Thai Lightweight title
2021-02-28	Win	(Thailand) Norasing Specialegym	RISE Eldorado 2021	Yokohama, Japan	Decision (Unanimous)	3	3:00
2020-12-06	Loss	(Thailand) Kiewsongsang Flyskygym	The Battle Of MuayThai - BOM WAVE03 – Get Over The COVID-19-	Yokohama, Japan	Decision (Unanimous)	5	3:00
2019-12-08	Win	(Thailand) Sila Y'ZD	BOM 2-6～THE Battle Of Muaythai SEASON II vol.6	Tokyo, Japan	TKO (Doctor Stoppage/cut)	1	2:46
Wins Battle of Muay Thai Lightweight title
2019-09-16	Loss	(Japan) Taiju Shiratori	Rise World Series 2019 Final	Chiba (city), Japan	KO (Left Straight)	1	
For the RISE World Series -61kg Tournament title.
2019-07-21	Win	(Korea) Chan Hyung Lee	Rise World Series 2019 Semi Finals	Osaka, Japan	Decision (Unanimous)	3	3:00
2019-05-19	Win	(Korea) Gyudong Lee	Rise 132	Tokyo, Japan	TKO (Middle kick)	2	2:45
2019-03-10	Win	(China) Lu Jun	Rise World Series 2019 First Round	Tokyo, Japan	Decision (Unanimous)	3	3:00
2018-12-05	Win	(Korea) Jeong Kihan	REBELS.59	Tokyo, Japan	Decision (Unanimous)	5	3:00
2018-10-08	Loss	(Thailand) Kiatpet Peekmairestaurant	REBELS.58	Tokyo, Japan	Decision (Majority)	5	3:00
2018-08-03	Win	(Netherlands) Piëtro Doorjé	REBELS.57	Tokyo, Japan	TKO (Right Elbow)	3	0:50
2018-06-06	Win	(Thailand) Pinphet Sitjadaeng	REBELS.56	Tokyo, Japan	Decision (Majority)	5	3:00
2018-02-18	Loss	(Thailand) Kulabdam Sor.Jor.Piek-U-Thai	Rebels 54	Tokyo, Japan	KO (Punches)	4	0:55
For the vacant Lumpinee Stadium Lightweight (135 lbs) title.
2017-11-24	Win	(Thailand) Inseetong Por.Phinaphat	REBELS.53	Tokyo, Japan	KO (Left Elbow)	4	0:31
2017-09-06	Win	(Thailand) Suarek Rukkukamui	REBELS.52	Tokyo, Japan	Decision (Unanimous)	5	3:00
2017-05-17	Loss	(Thailand) Sakmongkol Sor.Sommai	Rajadamnern Stadium	Bangkok, Thailand	Decision (Unanimous)	5	3:00
Loses the 135lbs Rajadamnern title.
2017-04-01	Loss	(Thailand) Rodlek Jaotalaytong	KNOCK OUT vol.2	Tokyo, Japan	Decision (Majority)	5	3:00
2017-02-12	Win	(Spain) Juan Mario Kaewsamrit	KNOCK OUT vol.1	Tokyo, Japan	Decision (Unanimous)	5	3:00
2016-12-05	Win	(Thailand) Sirimongkol PKsaenchaimuaythaigym	KNOCK OUT vol.0	Tokyo, Japan	Decision (Unanimous)	5	3:00
2016-10-23	Win	(Thailand) Yodlekpet Or. Pitisak	REBELS.46	Tokyo, Japan	Decision (Unanimous)	5	3:00
Wins the 135lbs Rajadamnern title
2016-09-17	Win	(England) Keith McLachlan	NJKF 2016 6th	Tokyo, Japan	TKO (Referee stoppage)	2	0:34
Defends WBC Muay Thai World Super Featherweight title
2016-08-07	Win	(Japan) Yasuyuki	REBELS.45	Tokyo, Japan	Technical Decision (Majority)	3	3:00
2016-06-24	Draw	(Thailand) Yodwandee Nitisamui	RIKIX NO KICK NO LIFE～THE FINAL～	Tokyo, Japan	Decision	5	3:00
2016-05-01	Win	(Thailand) Chatchainoi Sor Jor Toipaetriw	Syu Ken 31	Tokyo, Japan	TKO (Referee stoppage)	1	
2016-03-12	Draw	(Thailand) Starboy KwaythongGym	NO KICK NO LIFE 2016	Tokyo, Japan	Decision (Majority)	5	3:00
2015-12-23	Loss	(Thailand) Yodlekpet Or. Pitisak	Rajadamnern Stadium	Bangkok, Thailand	KO (Left Elbow)	3	
2015-10-18	Win	(Thailand) Songkom Nayoksany	REBELS.39	Tokyo, Japan	Decision (Unanimous)	5	3:00
2015-09-10	Loss	(Thailand) Saeksan Or. Kwanmuang	Rajadamnern Stadium	Bangkok, Thailand	Decision (Unanimous)	5	3:00
2015-07-20	Win	(Thailand) Petchboonchu Sor.Sommai	NJKF 2015 5th	Tokyo, Japan	KO (Right uppercut)	3	2:13
2015-05-10	Win	(Thailand) Muangthai PKSaenchaimuaythaigym	Wanchai+PK MuayThai Super Fight	Nagoya, Japan	TKO (Referee stoppage)	4	1:09
2015-04-19	Loss	(Thailand) Phetmorakot Wor Sangprapai	WPMF JAPAN×REBELS.35	Tokyo, Japan	Decision (Unanimous)	5	3:00
For the Lumpinee Stadium 130 lbs title
2015-02-11	Win	(Thailand) Rungrat Naratrikul	NO KICK NO LIFE 2015	Tokyo, Japan	Decision (Unanimous)	5	3:00
2014-11-15	Win	(Thailand) Jompichit Chuwattana	NJKF 2014 8th	Tokyo, Japan	Decision (Unanimous)	5	3:00
Wins WBC Muay Thai World Super Featherweight title
2014-09-21	Draw	(Thailand) Singtongnoi Por.Telakun	M-FIGHT Suk WEERASAKRECK VII	Tokyo, Japan	Decision	5	3:00
2014-04-13	Win	(Republic of Ireland) Stephen Meleady	NJKF 2014 3rd	Tokyo, Japan	Decision (Unanimous)	5	3:00
Wins WBC Muay Thai International Super Featherweight title
2014-02-11	Win	(Thailand) Pornsanae Sitmonchai	NO KICK NO LIFE 2014	Tokyo, Japan	TKO (Doctor Stoppage)	4	0:48
2013-11-17	Win	(Thailand) Kongsiam Tor Pitachai	M-FIGHT SUK WEERASAKRECK IV	Tokyo, Japan	KO (Right uppercut)	3	1:25
2013-09-15	Loss	(Thailand) Kaew Fairtex	M-FIGHT SUK WEERASAKRECK III	Tokyo, Japan	TKO (3 knockdowns)	2	1:14
2013-06-16	Win	(Thailand) Rudpet Por Warasin	M-FIGHT SUK WEERASAKRECK II	Tokyo, Japan	KO	1	2:01
2013-03-20	Win	(Korea) Chan Hyung Lee	RISE 92	Tokyo, Japan	Decision (Unanimous)	3	
2013-01-06	Win	(Korea) Kim Seung Yeol	RISE 91/M-1MC	Tokyo, Japan	KO	3	1:04
2012-10-14	Loss	(Korea) Chan Hyung Lee	K-1 World Grand Prix 2012 in Tokyo final 16	Tokyo, Japan	Decision	3	
2012-06-24	Win	(Thailand) Ankarnlek Excidicongym	M-1 Muay Thai Challenge Sutt Yod Muaythai vol.2 Part.2	Tokyo, Japan	KO (Right Cross)	2	2:31
2012-04-15	Win	(Thailand) Kongnapa Sirimongkol	REBELS.11	Tokyo, Japan	Decision (Unanimous)	5	3:00
2012-02-24	Loss	(Thailand) Kongnapa Sirimongkol	Lumpinee Stadium	Bangkok, Thailand	Decision	5	3:00
2011-12-22	Win	(Japan) Yosuke Morii	Fujiwara Matsuri 2011 Fuyu no Jin	Tokyo, Japan	Decision (Unanimous)	5	3:00
2011-11-13	Win	(Thailand) Dekkamon Hiraigym	M-1 Muay Thai Challenge RAORAK MUAY FINAL	Tokyo, Japan	TKO (Right Elbow)	1	2:39
Wins WPMF World Super Featherweight title
2011-09-11	Win	(Thailand) Wuttidet Lukprabat	M-1 FAIRTEX Muay Thai Challenge RAORAK MUAY vol.3	Tokyo, Japan	KO (Right Elbow)	4	2:23
2011-07-18	Win	(Thailand) Kaichon Sit Tamsap	REBELS.8 × IT'S SHOWTIME JAPAN countdown-1	Tokyo, Japan	KO (Left Low kick)	3	1:53
2011-04-24	Win	(Thailand) Suwannoi Acegym	REBELS.7	Tokyo, Japan	Decision (Unanimous)	5	3:00
2011-01-23	Win	(Japan) Yuya Kiyokawa	REBELS.7	Tokyo, Japan	Decision (Unanimous)	3	3:00
2010-11-14	Win	(Thailand) Kompayak Weerasakreck	M-1 FAIRTEX SINGHA BEER Muay Thai Challenge NAI KANOMTOMvol.4	Tokyo, Japan	Decision (Majority)	5	3:00
Wins M-1 Featherweight title
2010-09-26	Win	(Thailand) Egkarat	WBC Muay Thai The Path to the World Champion	Tokyo, Japan	Decision (Unanimous)	5	3:00
Wins WBC Muay Thai Japan Super Bantamweight title
2010-07-19	Win	(Japan) Yu Saenchaigym	REBELS.3	Tokyo, Japan	Decision (Unanimous)	5	3:00
Wins WPMF Japan Super Bantamweight title
2010-05-08	Win	(Thailand) Yotonyot Ketsiripat	Suk Fairtex	Tokyo, Japan	TKO	2	
2010-03-21	Loss	(Thailand) Norasing Kiatprasanchai	REBELS.2	Tokyo, Japan	Decision (Unanimous)	5	3:00
2010-01-23	Win	(Thailand) Rajasaklek Sor Vorapin	REBELS	Tokyo, Japan	TKO	4	0:49
2009-11-28	Win	(Japan) Shinjin	NJKF ROAD TO REAL KING 14	Japan	TKO	2	1:36
2009-08-09	Win	(Japan) Hari Nagata	Muay Thai Wave from YOKOHAMA 8	Japan	Decision (Unanimous)	3	3:00
2009-03-22	Win	(Japan) Yusuke Miho	NJKF GO FOR BROKE 〜ROAD TO REAL KING III	Japan	KO	1	2:19
2008-12-21	Win	(Thailand) Meechok Manopganchan	Daorung Chujaroen・UBC	Japan	KO	2	
2008-09-07	Win	(Japan) Takaaki Sugano	J-NETWORK "J-FIGHT in SHINJUKU 〜vol.5〜"	Tokyo, Japan	KO	2	0:54
2008-05-18	Win	(Japan) Okami	J-NETWORK "J-FIGHT 21"	Japan	Decision	3	3:00
2008-02-21	Win	(Japan) Hiro	TRIBELATE vol.16	Japan	Decision	3	3:00
2007-11-11	Win	(Japan) Hiroaki	M-1 FAIRTEX Freshmans in Oomori	Japan	Decision	3	3:00
Legend: Win Loss Draw/No contest Notes

== Exhibition boxing record ==
Professional record breakdown
1 match	0 wins	1 loss
By knockout	0	1

Res.	Record	Opponent	Method	Event	Date	Round	Time	Location	Notes
Loss	0–1	Ren Hiramoto	KO (left hook)	Bellator MMA vs. Rizin	31 December 2022	2	3:00	Tokyo, Japan	Special standing bout. Boxing rules with spinning back fist allowed.

== See also ==
- List of male kickboxers
- List of WBC Muaythai world champions
