= Hyuma Hitachi =

Japanese kickboxer

- Born: 常陸飛雄馬; February 16, 1998 (age 28); Munakata, Fukuoka, Japan
- Nickname: Star of the SHIBUYA
- Height: 172 cm (5 ft 8 in)
- Weight: 60 kg (130 lb; 9.4 st)
- Style: Kickboxing
- Stance: Orthodox
- Fighting out of: Tokyo, Japan
- Team: Target Shibuya
- Years active: 2018–present

Kickboxing record
- Total: 23
- Wins: 15
- By knockout: 9
- Losses: 7
- By knockout: 1
- Draws: 1

Hyuma Hitachi (Japanese: 常陸飛雄馬, Hitachi Hyuma; born February 16, 1998) is a Japanese kickboxer, currently competing in the super featherweight division of RISE. He is the current RISE Super Featherweight Champion. As of October 2022, he is ranked as the third best super bantamweight by Beyond Kick and the fourth best bantamweight by Combat Press.

== Kickboxing career ==
=== RISE ===
Hitachi made his professional debut against the future RISE featherweight (-57.5 kg) champion Keisuke Monguchi on the prelims of RISE 128 on November 2, 2018. He lost the fight by a first-round technical knockout. Hitachi next faced Masaaki Ono at RISE EVOL.2 on February 8, 2019. He won the fight by unanimous decision, with two judges scoring the bout 29–28 in his favor, while the third judge awarded Hitachi all three rounds of the bout. Hitachi failed to build on this victory however, as he suffered a unanimous decision loss to Ryosuke Nakazawa at RISE EVOL.3 on April 26, 2019, with all three judges scoring the fight 29–28 for Nakazawa.

Hitachi faced Masaumi Shimizu at RISE WEST ZERO on July 28, 2019. He won the fight by a third-round knockout, the first stoppage victory of his professional career. Hitachi faced REITO BRAVELY at Rise West 12 on December 8, 2019, in his fourth and final fight of the year. The bout was ruled a split decision draw. Two of the judges awarded a 30–29 scorecard to Hitachi and REITO respectively, while the third judge scored the fight as an even 29–29 draw.

After amassing a 2–2–1 record in his first five fights, Hitachi was booked to face Masanori Shimada at the fifth iteration of the RISE EVOL series, which was held on February 10, 2020. He won the fight by a second-round knockout, flooring Shimada with a right hook at the 1:54 minute mark of the round.

Hitachi faced Shun Onishi at Rise 149 on May 23, 2021, following a 15-month absence from competition. It was his first appearance on a numbered RISE event since his debut in November 2018. Hitachi won the fight by a second-round knockout. He dropped Onishi with a right straight near the end of the round, which left him unable to rise from the canvas in time to beat the eight-count.

These two victories earned Hitachi the #7 ranking in the RISE super featherweight division, as well as a fight with the #5 ranked contender SEIDO. The bout was booked for the undercard of Rise 152, which took place on October 22, 2021. He won the fight by unanimous decision, with scores of 30–29, 30–28 and 30–28.

Hitachi took a slight step-down in competition in his next bout, as he was scheduled to fight the top-ranked DEEP KICK super featherweight contender Taisei Iwago at Rise 154 on January 23, 2022. He won the fight by a second-round knockout, stopping Iwago with a right hook with just three seconds left in the round.

Hitachi faced the top ranked RISE super featherweight contender Yusaku Ishizuki at Rise El Dorado 2022 on April 2, 2022. He won the fight by a first-round knockout. He first forced the referee to step in, and call a knockdown, with a flurry of punches just past the midway point of the opening round. The referee waved the fight off soon after, as Ishizuki appeared unresponsive to Hitachi's hooking punches.

As he was unable to get a fight with the reigning RISE super featherweight champion Chan Hyung Lee, who was obliged to fight the interim titlist Kazuma, Hitachi faced the two-weight Shootboxing champion Yuki Kasahara at SHOOT BOXING 2022 act.4 on September 14, 2022. He won the fight by a second-round knockout.

Hotachi challenged Chan Hyung Lee for the RISE Super Featherweight Championship at RISE 164 on January 28, 2023. The fight was ruled a majority decision draw after the first five rounds, with one judge scoring the bout 49–48 for Lee, while the remaining two judges scored it an even 48–48. Lee was awarded the unanimous decision after an extra sixth round was contested.

Hitachi faced the one-time K-1 Super Featherweight champion Taiga at RISE World Series 2023 - 2nd Round on August 26, 2023. He lost the fight by unanimous decision, after an extra fourth round was contested.

Hitachi faced promotional newcomer Katsuji at RISE WORLD SERIES 2023 Final Round on December 16, 2023. He won the fight by a second-round knockout.

Hitachi faced the former Krush Featherweight and K-1 Featherweight champion Yuki Egawa at K-1 World MAX 2024 - World Tournament Opening Round on March 20, 2024. He lost the fight by split decision, after an extra fourth round was contested.

Hitachi faced Alisher Karmenov at RISE WORLD SERIES 2024 YOKOHAMA on September 8, 2024.

Hitachi faced Yuan Pengjie at RISE 185 on January 25, 2025. He won the fight by unanimous decision, with three scorecards of 29–28 in his favor.

Hitachi faced Shakhriyor Juraev in the quarterfinals of the 2025 RISE 61.5 kg World Series, which took place at RISE ELDORADO 2025 on March 29, 2025. He won the fight by a third-round knockout, as he stopped Juraev with a body kick with just 5 seconds left in the final round. Hitachi faced Yuan Pengjie at RISE WORLD SERIES 2025 Yokohama on June 21, 2025. He lost the fight by unanimous decision, with scores of 30—28, 30—28 and 30—27. Hitachi was knocked down by a left straight in the third round.

Hitachi faced Panuwat TGT for the vacant RISE Super Featherweight (-60kg) title at RISE 195 on January 18, 2026. He won the fight by unanimous decision, with scores of 47—50, 47—49, 47—48.

On September 12, 2026, Hitachi faced Hyu Iwata at ONE Samurai 3. He lost the bout by unanimous decision.

== Championships and accomplishments ==
=== Professional ===
- RISE
  - 2026 RISE Super Featherweight (-60kg) Champion

=== Amateur ===
- All Japan Student Kickboxing Federation
  - 2016 All Japan University Kickboxing -57.5 kg Champion & Best Newcomer Award
  - 2017 All Japan University Kickboxing -57.5 kg Champion & Best Fighter Award

== Fight record ==
Kickboxing record
15 wins (9 (T)KOs), 7 losses, 1 draw, 0 no contests
Date	Result	Opponent	Event	Location	Method	Round	Time
2026-09-12	Loss	(Japan) Hyu Iwata	ONE Samurai 3	Yokohama, Japan	Decision (unanimous)	3	3:00
2026-01-18	Win	(Thailand) Panuwat TGT	RISE 195	Tokyo, Japan	Decision (unanimous)	5	3:00
Wins the vacant RISE Super Featherweight (-60kg) title.
2025-10-19	Win	(Japan) GUMP	RISE 192	Tokyo, Japan	Decision (unanimous)	3	3:00
2025-06-21	Loss	(China) Yuan Pengjie	RISE WORLD SERIES 2025 Yokohama - 61.5 kg World Series, Semifinals	Yokohama, Japan	Decision (unanimous)	3	3:00
2025-03-29	Win	(Uzbekistan) Shakhriyor Juraev	RISE ELDORADO 2025 - 61.5 kg World Series, Quarterfinals	Tokyo, Japan	KO (body kick)	3	2:55
2025-01-25	Win	(China) Yuan Pengjie	RISE 185	Tokyo, Japan	Decision (unanimous)	3	3:00
2024-09-08	Win	(Kazakhstan) Alisher Karmenov	RISE WORLD SERIES 2024 YOKOHAMA	Yokohama, Japan	Decision (majority)	3	3:00
2024-03-20	Loss	(Japan) Yuki Egawa	K-1 World MAX 2024 - World Tournament Opening Round	Tokyo, Japan	Ext.R decision (split)	4	3:00
2023-12-16	Win	(Japan) Katsuji	RISE World Series 2023 - Final Round	Tokyo, Japan	KO (punches)	2	2:19
2023-08-26	Loss	(Japan) Taiga	RISE World Series 2023 - 2nd Round	Tokyo, Japan	Ext.R decision (unanimous)	4	3:00
2023-01-28	Loss	(South Korea) Chan Hyung Lee	RISE 164	Tokyo, Japan	Ext.R decision (unanimous)	6	3:00
For the RISE Super Featherweight (-60kg) title.
2022-09-17	Win	(Japan) Yuki Kasahara	Shoot Boxing 2022 act.4	Tokyo, Japan	KO (right straight)	2	1:12
2022-04-02	Win	(Japan) Yusaku Ishizuki	RISE ELDORADO 2022	Tokyo, Japan	TKO (three knockdowns)	1	2:59
2022-01-23	Win	(Japan) Taisei Iwago	RISE 154	Tokyo, Japan	KO (right hook)	2	2:57
2021-10-22	Win	(Japan) SEIDO	RISE 152	Tokyo, Japan	Decision (unanimous)	3	3:00
2021-07-04	Win	(Japan) Rai	DEEP☆KICK 54	Osaka, Japan	TKO (referee stoppage)	2	2:37
2021-05-23	Win	(Japan) Shun Onishi	RISE 149	Tokyo, Japan	KO (right straight)	2	2:38
2020-02-10	Win	(Japan) Masanori Shimada	RISE EVOL.5	Tokyo, Japan	KO (right hook)	2	1:54
2019-12-08	Draw	(Japan) REITO BRAVELY	RISE West 12	Fukuoka, Japan	Decision (split)	3	3:00
2019-07-28	Win	(Japan) Masaumi Shimizu	RISE WEST ZERO	Tokyo, Japan	KO	3	2:40
2019-04-26	Loss	(Japan) Ryosuke Nakazawa	RISE EVOL.3	Tokyo, Japan	Decision (unanimous)	3	3:00
2019-02-08	Win	(Japan) Masaaki Ono	RISE EVOL.2	Tokyo, Japan	Decision (unanimous)	3	3:00
2018-11-02	Loss	(Japan) Keisuke Monguchi	RISE 128	Tokyo, Japan	TKO (punches)	1	1:53
Legend: Win Loss Draw/no contest Notes

Amateur kickboxing record
Date	Result	Opponent	Event	Location	Method	Round	Time
2018-07-21	Loss	(Thailand) Pakorn Yoppakaw	World College Muaythai Championship	Pattaya, Thailand	KO	2	
2017-11-25	Win	(Japan) Ryo Hirayama	2017 All Japan Student Kickboxing Championship, -57.5 kg Tournament Final	Tokyo, Japan	KO	3	2:00
Won the 2017 All Japan University Kickboxing Featherweight (-57.5 kg) Championship.
2016-11-26	Win	(Japan) Taiki Morita	2016 All Japan Student Kickboxing Championship, -57.5 kg Tournament Final	Tokyo, Japan	Decision (majority)	3	2:00
Won the 2016 All Japan University Kickboxing Featherweight (-57.5 kg) Championship.
2016-09-18	Draw	(Japan) Ryo Miyake	2016 All Japan Student Kickboxing Championship, -57.5 kg Tournament Preliminaries	Tokyo, Japan	Decision (majority)	3	2:00
Hitachi advances despite the draw, due to tournament rules.
2015-08-15	Loss	(Japan) Yuto Shinohara	2015 K-1 Koshien, -65 kg Tournament Quarterfinals	Tokyo, Japan	KO		
2015-08-15	Win	(Japan) Takuma Tsukamoto	2015 K-1 Koshien, -65 kg Tournament Second Round	Tokyo, Japan	Ext. R. decision (split)	2	2:00
Legend: Win Loss Draw/no contest Notes

== See also ==
- List of male kickboxers
