= Kan Nakamura =

Japanese kickboxer

- Born: 中村寛; August 6, 1996 (age 30); Yao, Osaka, Japan
- Other names: Human Beast
- Height: 164 cm (5 ft 5 in)
- Weight: 62.0 kg (136.7 lb; 9.76 st)
- Stance: Southpaw
- Fighting out of: Osaka, Japan
- Team: BK Gym
- Years active: 2017 - present

Kickboxing record
- Total: 28
- Wins: 22
- By knockout: 16
- Losses: 5
- By knockout: 1
- No contests: 1

Kan Nakamura (Japanese: 中村寛, Nakamura Kan; born August 6, 1996) is a Japanese kickboxer. He is the reigning Rajadamnern Stadium Lightweight Champion and a former RISE lightweight champion. Kan Nakamura utilizes a southpaw stance based on Nippon Kempo and karate.

As of August 2024, he was ranked as the seventh best featherweight (-64 kg) kickboxer in the world by Beyond Kickboxing and the ninth best super bantamweight kickboxer (-64 kg) in the world by Combat Press.

== Career ==
=== Early career ===
==== Career beginnings ====
Nakamura made his professional kickboxing debut against Sota Kimura at Hoost Cup Kings Kyoto 3 on July 9, 2017. He won the fight by a second-round knockout. Nakamura's next fight was likewise with Hoost Cup, as he faced Ryuya at their Kings Osaka 2 event on November 26, 2017. He won the fight by a third-round technical knockout.

Nakamura faced Shun Kongo at DEEP KICK 35 on April 1, 2017. He won his promotional debut by a first-round technical knockout. Nakamura next faced Daiki at NJKF West Young Fight 4th on August 19, 2018. He won the fight by a first-round stoppage, needing just 46 seconds to knock Daiki out with a well placed knee. Nakamura returned to DEEP KICK to face Ryo Sato at DEEP☆KICK 37 on September 23, 2018. He won the fight by a second-round knockout, as Sato's corner opted to throw in the towel at the 1:01 minute mark, following a knockdown. Nakamura faced YO$HI at RKS GOLD RUSH 3 on December 16, 2018, in his fourth and final fight of the year. He won the fight by a first-round knockout.

==== DEEP KICK champion ====
His undefeated record, as well as his two victories with the organization, promoted Nakamura to DEEP KICK's top contender at super featherweight and earned him the right to challenge the reigning champion. His fight with Yuki Tanioka was scheduled as the main event of DEEP☆KICK 39, which took place on April 7, 2019, in Nakamura's native Osaka, Japan. Nakamura captured his first professional title via a second-round technical knockout. He knocked Tanioka twice in the first round, first time with a left straight and the second time with a left high kick. Nakamura knocked Tanioka down once more in the next round, before forcing the referee to wave the fight off with a flurry of punches at the 1:31 minute mark.

Kumura made his Rizin FF debut against Itto at Rizin 16 - Kobe on June 2, 2019. Nakamura knocked Itto with a right straight in the first round, before stopping him with a head kick in the second round.

=== RISE ===
==== Rise up the ranks ====
Nakamura was scheduled to participate in the 2019 RISE World Series super featherweight tournament, held on July 21, 2019, in Osaka, Japan. He faced the more experienced Ryuki in the semifinals of the four-man tournament. Nakamura lost his RISE debut by unanimous decision. Two of the judges scored the bout 30–28 in Ryuki's favor, while the third judge scored the bout 30–29 for Ryuki.

Nakamura faced Hirokatsu Miyagi at Rise on Abema on July 12, 2020, following a year-long absence from the sport. The fight was contested at 70 kg. He suffered his second professional loss, as Miyagi won the fight by split decision, with two judges scoring the bout 30–29 for Miyagi, while the third judge awarded an identical scorecard to Namakura.

Nakamura faced the former Krush Super Bantamweight and K-1 Super Featherweight champion Taiga at RISE WORLD SERIES 2021 Osaka on July 18, 2021, in a -62 kg catchweight bout. The two fighters were engaged in a brief onstage scuffle during the pre-fight face off, as Taiga shoved Nakamura after the latter stuck a middle finger in Taiga's face. Nakamura notched his first victory with RISE, as he won the fight by majority decision. Two judges scored the fight 29–28 for Nakamura, while the third judge scored it an even 28–28 draw. Nakamura came to the next day press conference wearing a cast and revealed that he had suffered a broken finger in training three weeks before the fight.

Nakamura was present in the audience during the RISE WORLD SERIES 2021 Yokohama event and entered the ring after the Naoki and Taiju Shiratori match took place, demanding a title fight. Although he was dismissed by Naoki, Nakamura was later called out by YA-MAN who offered Nakamura a fight in open finger gloves. The fight between the two was officially announced at a RISE press conference on October 13, 2021. It took place at RISE World Series 2021 Osaka 2 on November 14, 2021, and was contested at lightweight (62.5 kg). Nakamura lost the fight by unanimous decision, with all three judges scoring the bout 29–28 for YA-MAN.

After amassing a 1–3 record with RISE in his first three years with the promotion, Nakamura was booked to face Tomohiro Kitai at RISE El Dorado 2022 on April 2, 2022. He won the fight by a first-round knockout. Nakamura floored Kitai with a left cross in the final minute of the opening round, who had to be carried out on a stretcher. He called for a place at THE MATCH 2022 in his post-fight interview.

At a joint press conference held by RISE and K-1 on April 22, 2022, it was announced that Nakamura would face the former Krush super featherweight champion in a 62 kg catchweight bout. The fight took place on the undercard of the Tenshin Nasukawa vs. Takeru Abema pay-per-view, which took place on June 19, 2022, at the Tokyo Dome in Tokyo, Japan. Pettas was dismissive of Nakamura in his pre-fight interviews, stating: "Personally I thought I might fight Shiratori...When they gave me Nakamura, I watched his fights and he looked good, but his opponents were weak". Pettas was regarded as the second best kickboxer at 61.2 kg at the time of the fight's booking. Nakamura achieved the best win of his career up to that point, as he won the fight by majority decision. Two of the judges scored the fight 30–29 in his favor, while the third judged scored the bout as a 30–30 draw. During the post-fight interview, Nakamura revealed that he had suffered injuries to his hands.

Nakamura faced the RISE Super Featherweight (-60 kg) champion Chan Hyung Lee in a lightweight (62.5 kg) bout at RISE World Series 2022 on October 15, 2022. At the pre-fight press-conference, Nakamura stated that his fist hadn't yet fully healed from the break he suffered during the Pettas fight, but expected it to heal by October. Nakamura lost the fight by technical knockout. He was dropped by a flurry of punches at the 1:29 minute mark of the second round as was unable to rise from the canvas in time to beat the count.

Nakamura faced the 3–3 Sumiya Ito on the undercard of RISE 163 on December 10, 2022. He won the fight by a second-round knockout. He first dropped Ito with a left straight, before finishing him with another left straight soon after.

==== Lightweight champion ====
Nakamura challenged Naoki Tanaka for the RISE Lightweight Championship at RISE 167 on April 21, 2023. He captured the title by majority decision. Two ringside officials scored the bout 49–48 for Nakamura, while the third judge handed in an even 48–48 scorecard.

Nakamura faced Alisher Karmenov in a non-title bout at RISE World Series 2023 - 2nd Round on August 26, 2023. The fight was stopped in the first round, after an inadvertent low blow rendered Nakamura unable to continue competing. It was later revealed that Nakamura had suffered a dislocated shoulder at some point of the contest as well.

Nakamura faced Ahmed Akoudad at RISE WORLD SERIES 2023 Final Round on December 16, 2023. He won the fight by a second-round knockout.

Nakamura faced the reigning K-1 Lightweight champion Yuki Yoza in a cross-promotional bout at RISE ELDORADO 2024 on March 17, 2024. He lost the fight by a third-round knockout. The result was overturned to a majority decision win for Yoza on March 22, as the stoppage was judged to have resulted from an illegal strike on review.

Nakamura faced Thalisson Ferraira at RISE WORLD SERIES 2024 OSAKA on June 15, 2024. He won the fight by a third-round technical knockout.

Nakamura faced Yuan Pengjie at RISE WORLD SERIES 2024 YOKOHAMA on September 8, 2024. He won the fight by unanimous decision, after an extra fourth round was contested.

Nakamura faced the former RISE Super Featherweight (-60kg) champion Chan Hyung Lee in the quarterfinals of the 2025 RISE World Series at RISE ELDORADO 2025 on March 29, 2025. He won the fight by unanimous decision.

Nakamura faced the Shoot Boxing Japan Super Featherweight (-60 kg) title holder Yuki Kasahara in the semifinals of the RISE -61.5 kg World Series, held at RISE WORLD SERIES 2025 Yokohama. The fight was ruled a draw by majority decision, with one judge scoring the bout 30—29 for Kasahara. Nakamura won the fight by knockout in the fourth, extra round.

== Titles and accomplishments ==
=== Kickboxing ===
- DEEP KICK
  - 2019 DEEP KICK Super Featherweight (-60 kg) Championship
- RISE
  - 2023 RISE Lightweight (-63kg) Championship
  - 2025 RISE World Series -61.5kg Tournament Winner

=== Muay Thai ===
- Rajadamnern Stadium
  - 2026 Rajadamnern Stadium Lightweight (135 lbs) Champion

== Fight record ==
Kickboxing record
22 Wins (16 (T)KO's), 5 Losses, 0 Draw, 1 No Contest
Date	Result	Opponent	Event	Location	Method	Round	Time
2026-12-05		(Thailand) Samingdet Nor.Anuwatgym	Rajadamnern World Series	Bangkok, Thailand			
Defending the Rajadamnern Stadium Lightweight (135 lbs) title.
2026-10-10	Win	(Russia) Egor Bikrev	Rajadamnern World Series - Knocktober Fest	Bangkok, Thailand	KO (Stab kick to the body)	2	2:39
Wins the Rajadamnern Stadium Lightweight (135 lbs) title.
2026-05-16	Win	(Thailand) Kaipa Wor.Sangprapai	RISE 198	Tokyo, Japan	KO (Knee to the body)	2	1:04
2026-03-28	Win	(Thailand) Phet A-Cheer BangsaenFightClub	RISE ELDORADO 2026	Tokyo, Japan	KO (Left cross)	1	2:40
2025-11-02	Win	(China) Yuan Pengjie	RISE World Series 2025 Final - 61.5 kg World Series, Final	Tokyo, Japan	Ext.R Decision (Unanimous)	4	3:00
Wins the 2025 RISE World Series -61.5kg Tournament title.
2025-06-21	Win	(Japan) Yuki Kasahara	RISE WORLD SERIES 2025 Yokohama - 61.5 kg World Series, Semifinals	Yokohama, Japan	Ext.R KO (High kick)	4	1:48
2025-03-29	Win	(South Korea) Chan Hyung Lee	RISE ELDORADO 2025 - 61.5 kg World Series, Quarterfinals	Tokyo, Japan	Decision (Unanimous)	3	3:00
2024-09-08	Win	(China) Yuan Pengjie	RISE WORLD SERIES 2024 YOKOHAMA	Yokohama, Japan	Ext.R Decision (Unanimous)	4	3:00
2024-06-15	Win	(Brazil) Thalisson Gomes Ferreira	RISE WORLD SERIES 2024 OSAKA	Osaka, Japan	TKO (3 Knockdowns)	3	3:00
2024-03-17	Loss	(Japan) Yuki Yoza	RISE ELDORADO 2024	Tokyo, Japan	Tech.Decision (Majority)	3	2:33
2023-12-16	Win	(Morocco) Ahmed Akoudad	RISE World Series 2023 - Final Round	Tokyo, Japan	KO (Left hook)	2	1:31
2023-08-26	NC	(Kazakhstan) Alisher Karmenov	RISE World Series 2023 - 2nd Round	Tokyo, Japan	Doctor stoppage	1	
2023-04-21	Win	(Japan) Naoki Tanaka	RISE 167	Tokyo, Japan	Decision (Majority)	5	3:00
Wins the RISE Lightweight (-63kg) title.
2022-12-10	Win	(Japan) Sumiya Ito	RISE 163	Tokyo, Japan	KO (Left straight)	2	2:22
2022-10-15	Loss	(South Korea) Chan Hyung Lee	RISE WORLD SERIES 2022	Tokyo, Japan	TKO (Punches)	2	1:39
2022-06-19	Win	(Japan) Leona Pettas	THE MATCH 2022	Tokyo, Japan	Decision (Majority)	3	3:00
2022-04-02	Win	(Japan) Tomohiro Kitai	RISE El Dorado 2022	Tokyo, Japan	KO (Left cross)	1	2:13
2021-11-14	Loss	(Japan) YA-MAN	RISE World Series 2021 Osaka 2	Osaka, Japan	Decision (Unanimous)	3	3:00
2021-07-18	Win	(Japan) Taiga	RISE WORLD SERIES 2021 Osaka	Osaka, Japan	Decision (Majority)	3	3:00
2020-07-12	Loss	(Japan) Hirokatsu Miyagi	Rise on Abema	Tokyo, Japan	Decision (Split)	3	3:00
2019-07-21	Loss	(Japan) Ryuki Kaneda	RISE World Series Semi Finals	Osaka, Japan	Decision (Unanimous)	3	3:00
2019-06-02	Win	(Japan) Itto Nakatake	Rizin 16 - Kobe	Kobe, Japan	KO (Head kick)	2	3:00
2019-04-07	Win	(Japan) Yuki Tanioka	DEEP☆KICK 39	Osaka, Japan	TKO (Referee stoppage)	2	1:31
Wins DEEP Kick -60kg title.
2018-12-16	Win	(Japan) YO$HI	RKS GOLD RUSH 3	Osaka, Japan	KO (Left cross)	1	2:09
2018-09-23	Win	(Japan) Ryo Sato	DEEP☆KICK 37	Osaka, Japan	TKO (Corner stoppage)	2	1:01
2018-08-19	Win	(Japan) Daiki	NJKF West Young Fight 4th	Osaka, Japan	KO (Left Knee to the body)	1	0:46
2018-04-01	Win	(Japan) Shun Onishi	DEEP KICK 35	Osaka, Japan	TKO	1	2:37
2017-11-26	Win	(Japan) Ryuya	Hoost Cup Kings Osaka 2	Osaka, Japan	TKO	3	1:52
2017-07-09	Win	(Japan) Sota Kimura	Hoost Cup Kings Kyoto 3	Kyoto, Japan	KO (Left cross)	2	2:35
Legend: Win Loss Draw/No contest Notes

== See also ==
- List of male kickboxers
