= Yuan Pengjie =

Chinese kickboxer

- Born: September 26, 2002 (age 24); China
- Other names: Dark Horse Prince (黑马王子)
- Height: 172 cm (5 ft 8 in)
- Weight: 61 kg (134 lb; 9.6 st)
- Style: Kickboxing
- Stance: Southpaw
- Fighting out of: Foshan, China
- Team: Winner Fight Club

Kickboxing record
- Total: 45
- Wins: 41
- Losses: 4
- Draws: 0

Yuan Pengjie (Chinese: 袁鹏杰) is a Chinese kickboxer.

As of July 2025 he was the #9 ranked -61 kg kickboxer in the world by Beyond Kickboxing.

== Career ==
On July 30, 2022, Yuan defeated Jiang Ronglong by unanimous decision at Battle Time Championship.

On November 12, 2022, Yuan defeated Gao Haiwen by unanimous decision at Battle Time Championship.

On August 5, 2023, Yuan defeated Marius Odilon by decision at Wumenghui World Fighting Championship.

On October 23, 2023, Yuan defeated Ma Qiang by unanimous decision at TOP World Fighting Championship.

On May 4, 2024, Yuan defeated Fabio Loisi by unanimous decision at AFL.

Yuan faced Kan Nakamura at RISE World Series 2024 Yokohama on September 8, 2024. He lost the fight by unanimous decision after an extension round was contested.

Yuan faced Hyuma Hitachi at RISE 185 on January 25, 2025. He lost the fight by unanimous decision.

In January 2025 Yuan was announced as one of the eight participants in the RISE 61.5 kg World Series. In the quarterfinals of the tournament happening on March 29, 2025, at RISE Eldorado 2025 Yuan defeated Enfusion champion Rida Bellahcen by unanimous decision.

For the 2025 RISE 61.5 kg World Series semifinals Yuan rematched Hyuma Hitachi at RISE World Series 2025 Yokohama on June 21, 2025. He won the fight by unanimous decision after scoring a knockdown in the third round.

== Titles and accomplishments ==
=== Professional ===
- Zhuang Yao Warriors
  - 2023 Zhuang Yao Warriors 128-man Tournament -60 kg Winner
- RISE
  - 2025 RISE World Series -61.5kg Tournament Runner-up

=== Amateur ===
- 2023 Chinese National Kickboxing Championship (gold) -60 kg

== Fight record ==
Professional Kickboxing Record
40 Wins, 5 Losses, 0 Draw
Date	Result	Opponent	Event	Location	Method	Round	Time
2026-09-25	Loss	(Thailand) Kongthoranee Sor.Sommai	ONE The Inner Circle 32, Lumpinee Stadium	Bangkok, Thailand	Decision (Unanimous)	3	3:00
2026-06-05	Win	(Thailand) Jaosuayai Mor. Krungthepthonburi	ONE Friday Fights 157, Lumpinee Stadium	Bangkok, Thailand	Decision (Unanimous)	3	3:00
2026-03-27	Win	(Thailand) Lamnamoonlek Or.Atchariya	ONE Friday Fights 148, Lumpinee Stadium	Bangkok, Thailand	Decision (Unanimous)	3	3:00
2025-11-02	Loss	(Japan) Kan Nakamura	RISE World Series 2025 Final - 61.5 kg World Series, Final	Tokyo, Japan	Ext.R Decision (Unanimous)	4	3:00
For the 2025 RISE World Series -61.5kg Tournament title.
2025-06-21	Win	(Japan) Hyuma Hitachi	RISE WORLD SERIES 2025 Yokohama - 61.5 kg World Series, Semifinals	Yokohama, Japan	Decision (Unanimous)	3	3:00
2025-03-29	Win	(Morocco) Rida Bellahcen	RISE ELDORADO 2025 - 61.5 kg World Series, Quarterfinals	Tokyo, Japan	Decision (Unanimous)	3	3:00
2025-01-25	Loss	(Japan) Hyuma Hitachi	RISE 185	Tokyo, Japan	Decision (Unanimous)	3	3:00
2024-09-08	Loss	(Japan) Kan Nakamura	RISE WORLD SERIES 2024 YOKOHAMA	Yokohama, Japan	Ext.R Decision (Unanimous)	4	3:00
2024-05-04	Win	(France) Fabio Loisi	AFL	Duyun, China	Decision (Unanimous)	3	3:00
2024-04-22	Win	(Thailand)	Rajadamnern Stadium	Bangkok, Thailand	KO (Punch)	1	
2024-01-	Win	(China)	China Kickboxing League	China	Decision (Unanimous)	3	3:00
2023-11-18	Win	(China) Zhao Boshi	TOP World Fighting Championship	Anhui, China	Decision (Unanimous)	3	3:00
2023-10-21	Win	(China) Ma Qiang	TOP World Fighting Championship	Anhui, China	Decision (Unanimous)	3	3:00
2023-09-14	Win	(China) Li He	TOP World Fighting Championship	China	Decision (Unanimous)	3	3:00
2023-08-05	Win	(Madagascar) Marius Odilon	Wumenghui World Fighting Championship	Xiqiao, China	Decision	3	3:00
2023-05-01	Win	(China) Wang Xianjing	Zhuang Yao Warriors Tournament, Final	China	Decision (Unanimous)	3	3:00
Wins the Zhuang Yao 128-man Tournament -60kg title.
2023-05-01	Win	(China) Qing Puheng	Zhuang Yao Warriors Tournament, Semifinals	China	Decision (Unanimous)	3	3:00
2023-04-11	Win	(China) Wang Zhongxian	Zhuang Yao Warriors Tournament, Quarterfinals	China	Decision (Unanimous)	3	3:00
2023-04-10	Win	(China) Zhang Jingtao	Zhuang Yao Warriors Tournament	China	Decision (Unanimous)	3	3:00
2023-04-09	Win	(China)	Zhuang Yao Warriors Tournament	China	Decision (Unanimous)	3	3:00
2023-04-	Win	(China)	Zhuang Yao Warriors Tournament	China	KO (High kick)		
2023-03-25	Loss	(Thailand) Sanit Lookthamsuea	LWC Super Champ	Bangkok, Thailand	Decision	3	3:00
2023-01-	Win	(Belgium)	Rajadamnern Stadium	Bangkok, Thailand	Decision (Unanimous)	3	3:00
2023-	Win	(China) Li Xiancheng	Battle Time Championship	China	Decision (Unanimous)	3	3:00
2022-12-31	Win	(China)	Wu Lin Feng - Ruizhixin Mattress Cup	Foshan, China	Decision		
2022-11-18	Win	(China) Liu Longkuan	Eastern Dragon EWD Professional Boxing Championship	Nanshan, China	Decision (Unanimous)	3	3:00
2022-11-12	Win	(China) Gao Haiwen	Battle Time Championship, Team Tournament Semifinals	Kunming, China	Decision (Unanimous)	3	3:00
2022-07-30	Win	(China) Jiang Ronglong	Battle Time Championship	Linyi, China	Decision (Unanimous)	3	3:00
2022-	Win	(China)	Eastern Dragon EWD Professional Boxing Championship	Nanshan, China	TKO (Knee to the body)	2	
2022-	Win	(Thailand) Yutasak		China	KO (Body punches)	1	
2020-10-30	Win	(China)	Arena Hero Challenge 2020 WBC	Shenzhen, China	Decision	3	3:00
2019-07-	Win	(Thailand)		Hua Hin, Thailand	KO (Knee to the body)		
2019-07-	Win	(China) Wang Tianxiang		China	KO (Knee to the body)	3	
Legend: Win Loss Draw/No contest Notes

Professional Kickboxing Record
Date	Result	Opponent	Event	Location	Method	Round	Time
2023-06-24	Win	(China) Pan Xueqiang	Wu Lin Feng 539 - National Kickboxing Championship, Final	Tangshan, China	Decision (Unanimous)	3	2:00
Wins the 2023 Chinese National Kickboxing Championship -60kg title.
Legend: Win Loss Draw/No contest Notes
