= 2025 in RISE =

Kickboxing events

Information
- First date: January 25, 2025

The year 2025 is the 22nd year in the history of RISE, a Japanese kickboxing promotion.

RISE events are streamed on online service Abema TV.

== List of events ==
| # | Event title | Date | Arena | Location |
|---|---|---|---|---|
| 1 | RISE 185 | January 25, 2025 | Korakuen Hall | Tokyo, Japan |
| 2 | RISE EVOL 13 | February 11, 2025 | Otemachi Mitsui Hall | Tokyo, Japan |
| 3 | RISE 186 | February 23, 2025 | Korakuen Hall | Tokyo, Japan |
| 4 | RISE ELDORADO 2025 | March 29, 2025 | Ryōgoku Kokugikan | Tokyo, Japan |
| 5 | RISE 187 | April 19, 2025 | Korakuen Hall | Tokyo, Japan |
| 6 | RISE Fire Ball | May 11, 2025 | Port Messe Nagoya Exhibition Hall 3 | Nagoya, Japan |
| 7 | RISE 188 | May 31, 2025 | Korakuen Hall | Tokyo, Japan |
| 8 | RISE World Series 2025 Yokohama | June 21, 2025 | Yokohama Buntai | Yokohama, Japan |
| 9 | RISE 189 | June 29, 2025 | Korakuen Hall | Tokyo, Japan |
| 10 | RISE 190 | July 25, 2025 | Korakuen Hall | Tokyo, Japan |
| 11 | RISE World Series 2025 Tokyo | June 21, 2025 | Ota City General Gymnasium | Tokyo, Japan |
| 12 | RISE 191 | August 30, 2025 | Korakuen Hall | Tokyo, Japan |
| 13 | RISE EVOL Osaka | August 31, 2025 | Texpia Osaka | Osaka, Japan |
| 14 | RISE 192 | October 19, 2025 | Korakuen Hall | Tokyo, Japan |
| 15 | RISE World Series 2025 Final | November 2, 2025 | Ryōgoku Kokugikan | Tokyo, Japan |
| 16 | RISE 193 | November 9, 2025 | Korakuen Hall | Tokyo, Japan |
| 17 | RISE 194 | December 14, 2025 | Korakuen Hall | Tokyo, Japan |

== RISE 185 ==
RISE 185
- Promotion: RISE
- Date: January 25, 2025
- Venue: Korakuen Hall
- City: Tokyo, Japan

RISE 185 was a kickboxing event held by RISE at the Korakuen Hall in Tokyo, Japan on January 25, 2025.

=== Background ===
A catchweight bout between Hyuma Hitachi and Yuan Pengjie served as the co-main event.

=== Fight Card ===
RISE 185
| Weight Class | | | | Method | Round | Time | Notes |
|---|---|---|---|---|---|---|---|
| Catchweight 58 kg | (Japan) Haruto Yasumoto | def. | (China) Wang Xianjin | Decision (Unanimous) | 3 | 3:00 | |
| Catchweight 61.5 kg | (Japan) Hyuma Hitachi | def. | (China) Yuan Pengjie | Decision (Unanimous) | 3 | 3:00 | |
| Middleweight 70 kg | (Slovenia) Samo Petje | def. | (Japan) YUYA | Ext.R Decision (Split) | 4 | 3:00 | |
| Bantamweight 55 kg | (Japan) Ryoya Ito | def. | (Japan) Yuki Kyotani | Decision (Unanimous) | 3 | 3:00 | |
| Featherweight 57.5 kg | (Japan) Ryunosuke Omori | def. | (Japan) Ryoga Hirano | Decision (Unanimous) | 3 | 3:00 | |
| Featherweight 57.5 kg | (Japan) Kengo | def. | (Japan) Shuto Miyazaki | Decision (Unanimous) | 3 | 3:00 | |
| Featherweight 57.5 kg | (Japan) Retsu Sashida | def. | (Japan) Kenshin Miyamoto | KO (Right cross) | 2 | 2:40 | |
| Mini Flyweight 49 kg | (Japan) Mei Miyamoto | def. | (South Korea) Minju Cha | Decision (Unanimous) | 3 | 3:00 | |
| Mini Flyweight 49 kg | (Japan) Yura | def. | (Japan) Kitariko | Decision (Unanimous) | 3 | 3:00 | |
| Super Featherweight 60 kg | (Japan) Yutaro Hori | def. | (Japan) Sena Uchida | Decision (Majority) | 3 | 3:00 | |
| Lightweight 63 kg | (Japan) Masashi | def. | (Japan) Yuga Sugita | TKO (Referee stoppage) | 3 | | |

== RISE EVOL 13 ==
RISE EVOL 13
- Promotion: RISE
- Date: February 11, 2025
- Venue: Otemachi Mitsui Hall
- City: Tokyo, Japan

RISE EVOL 13 was a kickboxing event held by RISE at the Otemachi Mitsui Hall in Tokyo, Japan on February 11, 2025.

=== Fight Card ===
RISE EVOL 13
| Weight Class | | | | Method | Round | Time | Notes |
|---|---|---|---|---|---|---|---|
| Welterweight 67.5 kg | (Japan) Chappy Yoshinuma | def. | (Japan) Hiroshi Noguchi | Decision (Unanimous) | 3 | 3:00 | |
| Bantamweight 55 kg | (Japan) Tomoya Fukui | def. | (Japan) Ryuga Natsume | Decision (Unanimous) | 3 | 3:00 | |
| Super Featherweight 60 kg | (Japan) Taisei Kondo | def. | (Japan) Kazuteru Yamazaki | Decision (Unanimous) | 3 | 3:00 | |
| Super Flyweight 53 kg | (Japan) Shohei Ono | def. | (Japan) Ryoma Takeuchi | Decision (Majority) | 3 | 3:00 | |
| Mini Flyweight 49 kg | (Japan) Aira Sakabe | def. | (Japan) Ayuna | Decision (Unanimous) | 3 | 3:00 | |
| Super Flyweight 53 kg | (Japan) Masaki Senba | def. | (Japan) Yua | KO | 2 | | |

== RISE 186 ==
RISE 186
- Promotion: RISE
- Date: February 23, 2025
- Venue: Korakuen Hall
- City: Tokyo, Japan

RISE 186 was a kickboxing event held by RISE at the Korakuen Hall in Tokyo, Japan on February 23, 2025.

=== Background ===
A flyweight bout between former divisional champion Riku Kazushima and second-ranked RISE flyweight Tenshi Matsumoto was booked as the main event, while a women's flyweight bout between Manazo Kobayashi and KOKOZ served as the co-main event.

=== Fight Card ===
RISE 186
| Weight Class | | | | Method | Round | Time | Notes |
|---|---|---|---|---|---|---|---|
| Flyweight 51.5 kg | (Japan) Riku Kazushima | def. | (Japan) Tenshi Matsumoto | Decision (Unanimous) | 3 | 3:00 | |
| Women's Flyweight 52 kg | (Japan) Manazo Kobayashi | def. | (Japan) KOKOZ | Decision (Unanimous) | 3 | 3:00 | |
| Bantamweight 55 kg | (Japan) Musashi Matsushita | def. | (Thailand) Auto Nor.Naskin | Ext.R KO (Spinning back kick) | 4 | 2:59 | |
| Featherweight 57.5 kg | (Japan) Reiji | def. | (Japan) Ryoga Terayama | Decision (Unanimous) | 3 | 3:00 | |
| Super Featherweight 60 kg | (Japan) Shigeki Fujii | def. | (Japan) Takuya Taira | Decision (Unanimous) | 3 | 3:00 | |
| Super Lightweight 65 kg | (Japan) Genki Morimoto | def. | (Japan) Yuki Tanaka | Decision (Majority) | 3 | 3:00 | |
| Super Flyweight 53 kg | (Japan) Takumi Hoshi | def. | (Japan) Yuto Uemura | Decision (Unanimous) | 3 | 3:00 | |
| Featherweight 57.5 kg | (Japan) Shun Shiraishi | def. | (Japan) Saigo | Decision (Unanimous) | 3 | 3:00 | |
| Mini Flyweight 49 kg | (Japan) Yun Toshima | def. | (Japan) Yura | Decision (Unanimous) | 3 | 3:00 | |
| Atomweight 46 kg | (Japan) Haruka Shimada | def. | (Japan) Yuika Iwanaga | Decision (Unanimous) | 3 | 3:00 | |

== RISE Eldorado 2025 ==
RISE WORLD SERIES 2025
- Promotion: RISE
- Date: March 29, 2025
- Venue: Ryōgoku Kokugikan
- City: Tokyo, Japan

RISE ELDORADO 2025 was a kickboxing event held by RISE at the Ryōgoku Kokugikan in Tokyo, Japan on March 29, 2025.

=== Background ===
The event will feature the quarterfinals of the 2025 RISE 61.5 World Series as well as a 65kg title fight for the vacant belt between Taiju Shiratori and Yutaro Asahi. Miguel Trindade will take on YA-MAN in an open finger gloves match at 65kg.

=== Fight Card ===
RISE ELDORADO 2025
| Weight Class | | | | Method | Round | Time | Notes |
|---|---|---|---|---|---|---|---|
| Super Lightweight 65 kg | (Portugal) Miguel Trindade | def. | (Japan) YA-MAN | TKO (corner stoppage) | 3 | 0:43 | Open finger gloves match |
| Super Lightweight 65 kg | (Japan) Taiju Shiratori | def. | (Japan) Yutaro Asahi | Decision (majority) | 5 | 3:00 | For the vacant RISE Super Lightweight title |
| Super Lightweight 65 kg | (Japan) Kento Haraguchi | def. | (South Korea) Lee Sung-hyun | Decision (unanimous) | 3 | 3:00 | |
| Catchweight 52 kg | (Japan) Ryujin Nasukawa | def. | (Thailand) Kumandoi Petchyindee Academy | TKO (3 Knockdowns) | 2 | 2:39 | |
| Bantamweight 55 kg | (Japan) Shiro | def. | (South Korea) Deok Jae Yoon | Decision (unanimous) | 3 | 3:00 | |
| Catchweight 61.5 kg | (Japan) Kan Nakamura | def. | (South Korea) Chan Hyung Lee | Decision (unanimous) | 3 | 3:00 | 2025 RISE 61.5kg World Series Quarterfinals |
| Catchweight 61.5 kg | (Japan) Yuki Kasahara | def. | (Thailand) Panuwat TGT | KO (left cross) | 2 | | 2025 RISE 61.5kg World Series Quarterfinals |
| Catchweight 61.5 kg | (Japan) Hyuma Hitachi | def. | (Uzbekistan) Shakhriyor Juraev | KO (body kick) | 3 | 2: | 2025 RISE 61.5kg World Series Quarterfinals |
| Catchweight 61.5 kg | (China) Yuan Pengjie | def. | (Morocco) Rida Bellahcen | Decision (unanimous) | 3 | 3:00 | 2025 RISE 61.5kg World Series Quarterfinals |
| Super Flyweight 53 kg | (Japan) Kazuki Osaki | def. | (Philippines) Alester Tagure | KO (hook to the body) | 1 | 0:48 | |
| Welterweight 67.5 kg | (Japan) Meison Hide Usami | def. | (Philippines) Jerald Villarde | KO (knee to the head) | 2 | 1:41 | |
| Super Lightweight 65 kg | (Japan) YURA | def. | (Japan) Hiroto Yamaguchi | KO (left hook) | 1 | 1:53 | Open finger gloves match |
| Catchweight 61.5 kg | (Japan) GUMP | def. | (Japan) Ryunosuke Hosokoshi | Decision (majority) | 3 | 3:00 | 2025 RISE 61.5kg World Series Reserve |
Preliminary Card
| Flyweight 51 kg | (Japan) Ryunosuke Ito | def. | (Japan) Yumeto Mizuno | Decision (unanimous) | 3 | 3:00 | |
| Welterweight 67.5 kg | (Japan) Ruka | def. | (Japan) Atsuki | KO (knee to the head) | 1 | 1:48 | |
| Featherweight 57.5 kg | (Japan) Raiki | def. | (Japan) Kaoru Shimizu | KO (left hook) | 1 | 2:23 | |

== RISE 187 ==
RISE 187
- Promotion: RISE
- Date: April 19, 2025
- Venue: Korakuen Hall
- City: Tokyo, Japan

RISE 187 was a kickboxing event held by RISE at the Korakuen Hall in Tokyo, Japan on April 19, 2025.

=== Background ===
A bantamweight bout between Ryunosuke Omori and Masahiko Suzuki was scheduled as the main event.

=== Fight Card ===
RISE 187
| Weight Class | | | | Method | Round | Time | Notes |
|---|---|---|---|---|---|---|---|
| Bantamweight 55 kg | (Japan) Ryunosuke Omori | def. | (Japan) Masahiko Suzuki | Decision (unanimous) | 3 | 3:00 | |
| Featherweight 57.5 kg | (Japan) Taisei Umei | def. | (Japan) Shoa Arii | Decision (unanimous) | 3 | 3:00 | |
| Bantamweight 55 kg | (Japan) Rasta | def. | (Japan) Ryoya Ito | Decision (majority) | 3 | 3:00 | |
| Bantamweight 55 kg | (Japan) Tsubasa | def. | (Japan) Yuki Kyotani | KO (Left cross) | 3 | | |
| Super Lightweight 65 kg | (Japan) Sumiya Ito | def. | (Japan) Jin Ishida | KO (right cross) | 1 | | |
| Lightweight 63 kg | (Japan) Masahito Okuyama | def. | (Japan) Tomohiro Kitai | Decision (unanimous) | 3 | 3:00 | |
| Featherweight 57.5 kg | (Japan) Daiki Toita | def. | (Japan) Masamitsu Kutsuwa | Decision (unanimous) | 3 | 3:00 | |
| Featherweight 57.5 kg | (Japan) Aoi Kadowaki | def. | (Japan) Joichi Yana | TKO (Referee stoppage) | 2 | | |
| Bantamweight 55 kg | (Japan) Shoma Okumura | vs. | (Japan) Ren Kikukawa | No Contest (doctor stop) | 1 | | |
| Super Featherweight 60 kg | (Japan) Kosei Yoshida | def. | (Japan) Yushin Kodama | Decision (unanimous) | 3 | 3:00 | |
| Super Flyweight 53 kg | (Japan) Jo Aizawa | def. | (Japan) Kira | Decision (unanimous) | 3 | 3:00 | |

== RISE Fire Ball ==
RISE Fire Ball
- Promotion: RISE
- Date: May 11, 2025
- Venue: Port Messe Nagoya Exhibition Hall 3
- City: Nagoya, Japan

RISE Fire Ball was a kickboxing event held by RISE in Nagoya, Japan on May 11, 2025.

=== Background ===
The inaugural RISE Super Flyweight (-53 kg) World title bout between Corey Nicholson and Kazuki Osaki was booked as the main event. A RISE Mini Flyweight title bout between champion Arina Kobayashi and challenger Mei Miyamoto was scheduled as the co-main event.

=== Fight Card ===
RISE Fire Ball
| Weight Class | | | | Method | Round | Time | Notes |
|---|---|---|---|---|---|---|---|
| Super Flyweight 53 kg | (Japan) Kazuki Osaki | def. | (Australia) Corey Nicholson | TKO (Referee stoppage) | 5 | 1:24 | For the inaugural RISE Super Flyweight World title |
| Mini Flyweight 49 kg | (Japan) Mei Miyamoto | def. | (Japan) Arina Kobayashi (c) | Ext.R Decision (Unanimous) | 6 | 3:00 | For the RISE Queen Mini Flyweight title |
| Bantamweight 55 kg | (Japan) Koki Osaki | def. | (Japan) Keisuke Monguchi | TKO (Referee stoppage) | 2 | 2:17 | |
| Super Flyweight 53 kg | (Japan) Jin Mandokoro | def. | (Japan) Riku Kazushima | Decision (Split) | 3 | 3:00 | |
| Welterweight 67.5 kg | (Japan) Taichi Ishikawa | def. | (Japan) Aoki Yosuke | Decision (Unanimous) | 3 | 3:00 | |
| Super Lightweight 65 kg | (Japan) Sota Kimura | def. | (Japan) Shota | Decision (Unanimous) | 3 | 3:00 | |
| Lightweight 63 kg | (Japan) Kiyoto Takahashi | def. | (Japan) Kinchan | TKO (Doctor stoppage) | 3 | | |
| Catchweight 72 kg | (Thailand) Jet Petchmanee Meibukai | def. | (Japan) Masashi Yamato | Decision (Unanimous) | 3 | 3:00 | |
| Featherweight 57.5 kg | (Japan) Shosuke Iwanaga | def. | (Japan) Kazuhito | TKO (Punches) | 3 | 1:59 | |
| Super featherweight 60 kg | (Japan) Taisei Kondo | def. | (Japan) Kazuto | TKO (leg injury) | 3 | 0:15 | |
Preliminary Card
| Welterweight 67.5 kg | (Japan) Seiya | def. | (Japan) Haru Miyanoiri | KO (Left hooks) | 1 | 1:28 | |
| Super Lightweight 65 kg | (Japan) Yuya Kubota | draw. | (Argentina) Facundo Gramajo | Decision (Unanimous) | 3 | 3:00 | |
| Flyweight 51.5 kg | (Japan) Tasuku Okubo | def. | (Japan) Masaki Shion | Decision (Majority) | 3 | 3:00 | |

== RISE 188 ==
RISE 188
- Promotion: RISE
- Date: May 31, 2025
- Venue: Korakuen Hall
- City: Tokyo, Japan

RISE 188 was a kickboxing event held by RISE in Tokyo, Japan on May 31, 2025.

=== Background ===
A RISE Featherweight title bout between champion Haruto Yasumoto and challenger Yuta Kuneida served as the main event.

=== Fight Card ===
RISE 188
| Weight Class | | | | Method | Round | Time | Notes |
|---|---|---|---|---|---|---|---|
| Featherweight 57.5 kg | (Japan) Haruto Yasumoto (c) | def. | (Japan) Yuta Kunieda | KO (high kick) | 1 | 2:12 | For the RISE Featherweight title |
| Middleweight 70 kg | (Japan) Kakushi Takagi | def. | (Japan) Motoyasukku | Decision (unanimous) | 3 | 3:00 | |
| Middleweight 70 kg | (Japan) Hirokatsu Miyagi | def. | (Japan) Masashi Nakajima | Decision (unanimous) | 3 | 3:00 | |
| Super Flyweight 53 kg | (Japan) Kaito Hasegawa | def. | (Japan) Hiroto Yokoyama | Decision (unanimous) | 3 | 3:00 | |
| Super Flyweight 53 kg | (Japan) Sora Tanazawa | def. | (Japan) Ryuta Suekuni | KO (high kick) | 2 | 2:02 | |
| Super Featherweight 60 kg | (Japan) Shigeki Fujii | def. | (Japan) Aito Suenaga | Decision (unanimous) | 3 | 3:00 | |
| Atomweight 46 kg | (Japan) Honoka Tsujii | def. | (Japan) Yuika Iwanaga | Decision (majority) | 3 | 3:00 | |
| Atomweight 46 kg | (Japan) Haruka Shimada | def. | (Japan) Runa Okumura | TKO (punches) | 1 | 2:27 | |
| Lightweight 63 kg | (Japan) Hiroki Suzuki | def. | (Japan) Andrei Haraguchi | Decision (majority) | 3 | 3:00 | |
| Lightwweight 63 kg | (Japan) Masashi | def. | (Japan) Noboru Kuboyama | KO (Low kick) | 3 | 0:28 | |
| Mini Flyweight 49 kg | (Japan) Ami | def. | (Japan) Yuka Terada | Decision (unanimous) | 3 | 3:00 | |

== RISE World Series 2025 Yokohama ==
RISE World Series 2025 Yokohama
- Promotion: RISE
- Date: June 21, 2025
- Venue: Yokohama Buntai
- City: Yokohama, Japan

RISE World Series 2025 Yokohama or Glory 101 was a kickboxing event held by RISE in Yokohama, Japan on June 21, 2025.

=== Background ===
The inaugural ISKA K-1 World Strawweight (-51.5 kg) title bout between Ryujin Nasukawa and Hamada Azmani was scheduled as the main event.

=== Fight Card ===
RISE World Series 2025 Yokohama
| Weight Class | | | | Method | Round | Time | Notes |
|---|---|---|---|---|---|---|---|
| Flyweight 51.5 kg | (Japan) Ryujin Nasukawa | def. | (Morocco) Hamada Azmani | Decision (unanimous) | 3 | 3:00 | For the inaugural ISKA K-1 World Strawweight title |
| Catchweight 61.5 kg | (Japan) Kan Nakamura | def. | (Japan) Yuki Kasahara | KO (high kick) | 4 | | 2025 RISE 61.5kg World Series Semifinals |
| Catchweight 61.5 kg | (China) Yuan Pengjie | def. | (Japan) Hyuma Hitachi | Decision (unanimous) | 3 | 3:00 | 2025 RISE 61.5kg World Series Semifinals |
| Super Lightweight 65 kg | (Japan) Hiroki Kasahara | def. | (Thailand) Lompetch BeastGym | Decision (unanimous) | 3 | 3:00 | RISE GLORY Last Featherweight Standing Opening Round |
| Super Lightweight 65 kg | (Moldova) Petru Morari | def. | (Japan) Sumiya Ito | Decision (split) | 3 | 3:00 | RISE GLORY Last Featherweight Standing Opening Round |
| Super Lightweight 65 kg | (Spain) Aitor Currito | def. | (Morocco) Ayoub Bourass | Decision (unanimous) | 3 | 3:00 | RISE GLORY Last Featherweight Standing Opening Round |
| Super Lightweight 65 kg | (France) Bobo Sacko | def. | (Netherlands) Jan Kaffa | Decision (unanimous) | 3 | 3:00 | RISE GLORY Last Featherweight Standing Opening Round |
| Catchweight 54 kg | (Japan) Ryu Hanaoka | def. | (Malaysia) Muhammad Mikail Ghazali | Decision (unanimous) | 3 | 3:00 | |
| Catchweight 57 kg | (Japan) Masahiko Suzuki | def. | (Japan) Daiki Toita | Decision (unanimous) | 3 | 3:00 | |
| Lightweight 63 kg | (Japan) Tomohiro Kitai | def. | (Japan) Yuki | Decision (unanimous) | 3 | 3:00 | |
| Catchweight 61.5 kg | (Japan) GUMP | def. | (Japan) Ryo Takahashi | Decision (unanimous) | 3 | 3:00 | |
| Bantamweight 55 kg | (Japan) Ryoya Ito | def. | (Japan) Musashi Matsushita | Decision (majority) | 3 | 3:00 | |
| Welterweight 67.5 kg | (Japan) Chappy Yoshinuma | def. | (Japan) Takamasa Abiko | TKO (punches) | 3 | 0:24 | |
| Bantamweight 55 kg | (Japan) Yugo Kato | def. | (Japan) Reiji | KO (left hook) | 2 | | |
Preliminary Card
| Welterweight 67.5 kg | (Japan) Ruka | def. | (Japan) Hiroki Zaitsu | KO (Left cross) | 2 | 0:54 | |
| Flyweight 51.5 kg | (Japan) Yumeto Mizuno | def. | (Japan) Aron | Decision (unanimous) | 3 | 3:00 | |
| Super Flyweight 53 kg | (Japan) Kodai Ono | def. | (Japan) Koki | Decision (unanimous) | 3 | 3:00 | |

== RISE 189 ==
RISE 189
- Promotion: RISE
- Date: June 29, 2025
- Venue: Korakuen Hall
- City: Tokyo, Japan

RISE 189 was a kickboxing event held by RISE in Tokyo, Japan on June 29, 2025.

=== Background ===
A RISE Queen Flyweight title bout between champion Tessa De Kom and challenger Manazo Kobayashi was scheduled as the main event.

=== Fight Card ===
RISE 189
| Weight Class | | | | Method | Round | Time | Notes |
|---|---|---|---|---|---|---|---|
| W.Flyweight 52 kg | (Netherlands) Tessa De Kom (c) | def. | (Japan) Manazo Kobayashi | Decision (unanimous) | 5 | 3:00 | for the RISE Queen Flyweight title |
| Super Lightweight 65 kg | (Thailand) Suarek TeppenGym | def. | (Japan) Sota "Cerberus" Kimura | Decision (unanimous) | 3 | 3:00 | Gachi!! Tournament, Final |
| Flyweight 51.5 kg | (Japan) Tenshi Matsumoto | def. | (Japan) Yuto Hirayama | Decision (unanimous) | 3 | 3:00 | |
| Flyweight 51.5 kg | (Japan) Reiya | def. | (Japan) Ryunosuke Ito | Decision (unanimous) | 3 | 3:00 | |
| Super Featherweight 60 kg | (Japan) Ryunosuke Hosokoshi | def. | (Japan) Taisei Kondo | TKO (body kick and punches) | 1 | 1:25 | |
| W.Flyweight 52 kg | (Japan) Melty Kira | vs. | (Japan) Yaya Weerasakreck | No contest (head clash) | 1 | 0:17 | |
| Super Lightweight 65 kg | (Japan) Taichi Nomura | def. | (Japan) Genki Morimoto | Ext.R Decision (unanimous) | 4 | 3:00 | Gachi!! Tournament, Reserve |
| Super Lightweight 65 kg | (Thailand) Suarek TeppenGym | def. | (Japan) Ke-suke | Decision (unanimous) | 3 | 3:00 | Gachi!! Tournament, Semifinals |
| Super Lightweight 65 kg | (Japan) Sota "Cerberus" Kimura | def. | (Japan) Hiroto Yamaguchi | Decision (unanimous) | 3 | 3:00 | Gachi!! Tournament, Semifinals |
| Featherweight 57.5 kg | (Japan) Kosei Yoshida | def. | (Japan) Ryoga Terayama | Decision (split) | 3 | 3:00 | |

== RISE 190 ==
RISE 190
- Promotion: RISE
- Date: July 25, 2025
- Venue: Korakuen Hall
- City: Tokyo, Japan

RISE 190 was a kickboxing event held by RISE in Tokyo, Japan on July 25, 2025.

=== Fight Card ===
RISE 190
| Weight Class | | | | Method | Round | Time | Notes |
|---|---|---|---|---|---|---|---|
| Light Heavyweight 90 kg | (Japan) Kenta Nanbara | def. | (South Korea) Seong Jik Jeong | Ext.R Decision (unanimous) | 4 | 3:00 | |
| Middleweight 70 kg | (Thailand) Singphayak Hamagym | def. | (Japan) Takumi Sanekata | Decision (unanimous) | 3 | 3:00 | |
| Atomweight 46 kg | (Japan) Koto Hiraoka | def. | (Japan) Honoka Tsujii | Ext.R Decision (unanimous) | 4 | 3:00 | |
| Super Lightweight 65 kg | (Japan) Yuki Tanaka | def. | (Japan) Tetsu | TKO (3 knockdowns) | 1 | 2:24 | |
| Bantamweight 55 kg | (Japan) Shoma Okumura | def. | (Japan) Kyosuke | KO (Uppercut) | 2 | 1:34 | |
| Super Featherweight 60 kg | (Japan) Shu Sugimoto | def. | (Japan) Kenichi Takeuchi | KO (punches) | 1 | 2:45 | |
| Exhibition | (Japan) Tenshi Matsumoto | vs. | (Japan) Ryu Matsunaga | | | | |
| Featherweight 57.5 kg | (Japan) Shosuke Iwanaga | def. | (Japan) Ryunosuke Matsushita | TKO (doctor stoppage) | 3 | 3:00 | |
| Lightweight 63 kg | (Japan) Kanazawa Gorichu Mitsuki | def. | (Japan) Masashi | TKO (corner stoppage) | 2 | 3:00 | |
| Super Lightweight 65 kg | (Japan) Taiyo | def. | (Japan) Yuta Take | KO (knee to the body) | 2 | 1:29 | |
| Heavyweight | (Japan) Chan | def. | (Japan) Kazuyayanenkedo | Decision (unanimous) | 3 | 3:00 | |
| Super Flyweight 53 kg | (Japan) Shohei Ono | def. | (Japan) Rikuto | TKO (3 knockdowns) | 3 | 2:09 | |

== RISE World Series 2025 Tokyo ==
RISE World Series 2025 Tokyo
- Promotion: RISE
- Date: August 2, 2025
- Venue: Ota City General Gymnasium
- City: Tokyo, Japan

RISE World Series 2025 Tokyo was a kickboxing event held by RISE in Tokyo, Japan on August 2, 2025.

=== Background ===
A RISE Bantamweight World title bout between champion Shiro and challenger Masashi Kumura was booked as the main event, while a RISE Super Lightweight (-65kg) World title bout between champion Chadd Collins and challenger Kento Haraguchi served as the co-main event.

=== Fight Card ===
RISE World Series 2025 Tokyo
| Weight Class | | | | Method | Round | Time | Notes |
|---|---|---|---|---|---|---|---|
| Bantamweight 55 kg | (Japan) Shiro (c) | def. | (Japan) Masashi Kumura | Decision (unanimous) | 5 | 3:00 | For the RISE Bantamweight World title |
| Super Lightweight 65 kg | (Australia) Chadd Collins (c) | def. | (Japan) Kento Haraguchi | Decision (split) | 5 | 3:00 | For the RISE Super Lightweight World title |
| Super Flyweight 53 kg | (Japan) Ryujin Nasukawa | def. | (Japan) Jin Mandokoro | Decision (unanimous) | 3 | 3:00 | |
| Super Lightweight 65 kg | (Japan) Taiju Shiratori | def. | (United Kingdom) Andy Turland | KO (body kick) | 1 | 1:53 | |
| Super Lightweight 65 kg | (Germany) Denis Wosik | def. | (Thailand) Suarek TeppenGym | Decision (unanimous) | 3 | 3:00 | RISE GLORY Last Featherweight Standing Opening Round |
| Super Lightweight 65 kg | (Japan) Yutaro Asahi | def. | (Spain) Eduardo Catalin | KO (high kick) | 3 | 2:28 | RISE GLORY Last Featherweight Standing Opening Round |
| Super Lightweight 65 kg | (Italy) Achraf Aasila | def. | (Algeria) Lounis Saing | Decision (unanimous) | 3 | 3:00 | RISE GLORY Last Featherweight Standing Opening Round |
| Super Lightweight 65 kg | (Japan) YURA | def. | (China) Kong Dexiang | TKO (punches) | 1 | 1:33 | RISE GLORY Last Featherweight Standing Opening Round |
| Bantamweight 55 kg | (Japan) Rasta | def. | (Thailand) Auto OneLink | KO (left cross) | 1 | 2:32 | |
| Super Featherweight 60 kg | (Japan) Rantaro | def. | (Japan) Seido | Decision (unanimous) | 3 | 3:00 | |
| Catchweight 54 kg | (Japan) Ryu Hanaoka | def. | (Japan) Momu Tsukamoto | TKO (punches) | 2 | 2:53 | Open finger gloves match |
| Catchweight 53.5 kg | (Japan) Kazuki Osaki | def. | (Thailand) Lanyakaew Tor.Silapon | TKO (body punches) | 3 | 2:46 | Open finger gloves match |
Preliminary Card
| Catchweight 51 kg | (Japan) Yun Toshima | draw. | (Japan) Hotaru | Decision (split) | 3 | 3:00 | |
| Lightweight 63 kg | (Japan) Kazuteru Yamazaki | def. | (Japan) Yudai Arai | KO (body kick) | 3 | 1:40 | |
| Bantamweight 55 kg | (Japan) Renji Inoue | def. | (Japan) Masaki Senba | TKO (corner stoppage) | 3 | 3:52 | |

== RISE 191 ==
RISE 191
- Promotion: RISE
- Date: August 30, 2025
- Venue: Korakuen Hall
- City: Tokyo, Japan

RISE 191 was a kickboxing event held by RISE in Tokyo, Japan on August 30, 2025.

=== Background ===
A bantamweight non-title bout between RISE Bantamweight champion Koki Osaki and Djillali Kharroubi was booked as the main event.

=== Fight Card ===
RISE 191
| Weight Class | | | | Method | Round | Time | Notes |
|---|---|---|---|---|---|---|---|
| Bantamweight 55 kg | (Japan) Koki Osaki | def. | (France) Djillali Kharroubi | Decision (unanimous) | 3 | 3:00 | |
| Bantamweight 55 kg | (Japan) Masahiko Suzuki | def. | (Japan) Yugo Kato | Decision (unanimous) | 3 | 3:00 | |
| Super Flyweight 53 kg | (Japan) Sora Tanazawa | def. | (Japan) Reiya | Decision (unanimous) | 3 | 3:00 | Gachi!! Tournament, Final |
| Atomweight 46 kg | (Japan) Haruka Shimada | def. | (Japan) Fuu | Decision (majority) | 3 | 3:00 | |
| Middleweight 70 kg | (Japan) YUYA | def. | (Japan) Kakushi Takagi | TKO (corner stoppage) | 2 | 2:18 | |
| Welterweight 67.5 kg | (Japan) Ryoya Inai | def. | (Japan) Teppei Wada | Ext.R Decision (unanimous) | 4 | 3:00 | |
| Welterweight 67.5 kg | (Japan) Kenta | def. | (Japan) Hiroshi Noguchi | KO (right cross) | 1 | 2:18 | |
| Super Flyweight 53 kg | (Japan) Jo Aizawa | def. | (Japan) Renji Inoue | KO (knee to the head) | 2 | 0:32 | Gachi!! Tournament, Reserve |
| Super Flyweight 53 kg | (Japan) Reiya | def. | (Japan) JIN | Ext.R Decision (split) | 4 | 3:00 | Gachi!! Tournament, Semifinals |
| Super Flyweight 53 kg | (Japan) Sora Tanazawa | def. | (Japan) Shuri Sakayori | Decision (unanimous) | 3 | 3:00 | Gachi!! Tournament, Semifinals |
| Super Flyweight 60 kg | (Japan) Ryusho Toda | def. | (Japan) Taisei Kako | KO (Body kick) | 1 | 1:04 | |

== RISE EVOL Osaka ==
RISE EVOL Osaka
- Promotion: RISE
- Date: August 31, 2025
- Venue: Texpia Osaka
- City: Osaka, Japan

RISE EVOL Osaka was a kickboxing event held by RISE in Osaka, Japan on August 31, 2025.

=== Fight Card ===
RISE EVOL Osaka
| Weight Class | | | | Method | Round | Time | Notes |
|---|---|---|---|---|---|---|---|
| Faetherweight 57.5 kg | (Japan) Renji | def. | (Japan) Shoma | Decision (majority) | 3 | 3:00 | |
| Flyweight 51.5 kg | (Japan) King Rikuto | def. | (Japan) Dangan Futa | KO (left cross) | 2 | 1:10 | |
| Faetherweight 57.5 kg | (Japan) Aoi Kadowaki | def. | (Japan) King Ryuzo | Decision (unanimous) | 3 | 3:00 | |
| Bantamweight 55 kg | (Japan) Atsuki Yamada | def. | (Japan) Shoma Okumura | Decision (unanimous) | 3 | 3:00 | |
| Super Flyweight 53 kg | (Japan) Yuto Uemura | def. | (Japan) Shunnosuke | Decision (unanimous) | 3 | 3:00 | |
| Super Faetherweight 60 kg | (Japan) Koki Ueno | def. | (Japan) Sho Arao | KO (punches) | 1 | 1:04 | |
| Super Flyweight 53 kg | (Japan) Taki | def. | (Japan) Ryusei | KO (high kick) | 3 | 2:59 | |
| Super Lightweight 65 kg | (Japan) Yuki Yamamoto | def. | (Japan) Rinto Kato | Decision (unanimous) | 3 | 3:00 | |
| Super Flyweight 53 kg | (Japan) Kosei Sasaki | def. | (Japan) Kotaro Hayashi | KO | 3 | 1:59 | |

== RISE 192 ==
RISE 192
- Promotion: RISE
- Date: October 19, 2025
- Venue: Korakuen Hall
- City: Tokyo, Japan

RISE 192 was a kickboxing event held by RISE in Tokyo, Japan on October 19, 2025.

=== Fight Card ===
RISE 192
| Weight Class | | | | Method | Round | Time | Notes |
|---|---|---|---|---|---|---|---|
| Super Featherweight 60 kg | (Japan) Hyuma Hitachi | def. | (Japan) GUMP | Decision (unanimous) | 3 | 3:00 | |
| Super Featherweight 60 kg | (Thailand) Panuwat TGT | def. | (Japan) Ryunosuke Hosokoshi | Decision (unanimous) | 3 | 3:00 | |
| Mini Flyweight 49 kg | (Japan) Mei Miyamoto | def. | (South Korea) Ko Yuna | Decision (unanimous) | 3 | 3:00 | |
| Featherweight 57.5 kg | (Japan) Taisei Umei | def. | (Japan) Kosei Yoshida | Tech. Decision (unanimous) | 2 | 2:07 | |
| Featherweight 57.5 kg | (Japan) Ryunosuke Omori | def. | (Japan) Kakeru | Decision (unanimous) | 3 | 3:00 | |
| Lightweight 63 kg | (Japan) Ryuto Shiokawa | def. | (Japan) Sumiya Ito | Decision (unanimous) | 3 | 3:00 | |
| Lightweight 63 kg | (Japan) Aichi | def. | (Japan) Tomohiro Kitai | Decision (unanimous) | 3 | 3:00 | |
| Mini Flyweight 49 kg | (Japan) Ayuna | def. | (Japan) Ayuna | Decision (unanimous) | 3 | 3:00 | |
| Welterweight 67.5 kg | (Japan) Ruka | def. | (Japan) Koki Takeuchi | TKO (punches) | 1 | 1:35 | |
| Super Flyweight 53 kg | (Japan) Yusuke ito | def. | (Japan) Oyacchi | Decision (unanimous) | 3 | 3:00 | |

== RISE World Series 2025 Final ==
RISE World Series 2025 Final
- Promotion: RISE
- Date: November 2, 2025
- Venue: Ryōgoku Kokugikan
- City: Tokyo, Japan

RISE World Series 2025 Final will be a kickboxing event held by RISE in Tokyo, Japan on November 2, 2025.

=== 2025 RISE 61.5kg World Series bracket ===
Quarter-finals (2025-03-29)
(China) Yuan Pengjie | UD
(Morocco) Rida Bellahcen | 3
(Japan) Hyuma Hitachi | KO
(Uzbekistan) Shakhriyor Jurayev | 3
(Japan) Yuki Kasahara | KO
(Thailand) Panuwat TGT | 2
(Japan) Kan Nakamura | UD
(South Korea) Chan Hyung Lee | 3

Semi-finals (2025-06-21)
(China) Yuan Pengjie | UD
(Japan) Hyuma Hitachi | 3
(Japan) Yuki Kasahara | 4
(Japan) Kan Nakamura | KO

Final
(China) Yuan Pengjie | Ext.R
(Japan) Kan Nakamura | UD

=== Fight Card ===
RISE World Series 2025 Final
| Weight Class | | | | Method | Round | Time | Notes |
|---|---|---|---|---|---|---|---|
| Catchweight 61.5 kg | (Japan) Kan Nakamura | def. | (China) Yuan Pengjie | Ext.R Decision (unanimous) | 4 | 3:00 | 2025 RISE 61.5kg World Series Final |
| Catchweight 66 kg | (Japan) YURA | def. | (Japan) Sumiya Ito | KO (jab) | 1 | 1:46 | Open finger gloves bout |
| Super Lightweight 65 kg | (Japan) Hiroki Kasahara | def. | (Japan) Taiju Shiratori | Ext.R Decision (unanimous) | 4 | 3:00 | RISE x GLORY Last Featherweight Standing Second Round |
| Super Lightweight 65 kg | (South Korea) Lee Sung-hyun | def. | (Japan) Yutaro Asahi | Decision (majority) | 3 | 3:00 | RISE x GLORY Last Featherweight Standing Second Round |
| Super Lightweight 65 kg | (Japan) Kento Haraguchi | def. | (Moldova) Petru Morari | TKO (3 Knockdowns) | 1 | | RISE x GLORY Last Featherweight Standing Second Round |
| Catchweight 85 kg | (Japan) Kenta Nanbara | def. | (France) Frangis Goma | Decision (unanimous) | 3 | 3:00 | |
| Bantamweight 55 kg | (Japan) Shiro | def. | (Thailand) Petchsaenkom Sor.Sommai | KO (right cross) | 2 | 0:29 | |
| Welterweight 67.5 kg | (Japan) Meison Hide Usami | def. | (South Korea) Sang-hae Cho | Decision (majority) | 3 | 3:00 | |
| Catchweight 52.5 kg | (Japan) Miyo Yoshida | def. | (Japan) Mikity | Decision (unanimous) | 3 | 3:00 | |
| Flyweight 51.5 kg | (Japan) Sora Tanazawa | def. | (Japan) Riku Kazushima | Decision (unanimous) | 3 | 3:00 | |
| Flyweight 51.5 kg | (Japan) Tenshi Matsumoto | def. | (Japan) Momu Tsukamoto | Decision (majority) | 3 | 3:00 | |
| Super Featherweight 60 kg | (Japan) Keisuke Monguchi | def. | (Japan) Ryuto | Decision (majority) | 3 | 3:00 | |
| Super Featherweight 60 kg | (Japan) Daiki Toita | def. | (Japan) Yuki | KO (right cross) | 2 | 2:44 | |
Preliminary Card
| Atomweight 46 kg | (Japan) Yaya Weerasakreck | def. | (Japan) Ami | Decision (unanimous) | 3 | 3:00 | |
| Super Flyweight 53 kg | (Japan) Kodai Ono | def. | (Japan) Tokiya Ibata | TKO (Punches) | 1 | 2:53 | |
| Featherweight 57.5 kg | (Japan) Kazuki | draw. | (Japan) Raiki | Decision (majority) | 3 | 3:00 | |
| Atomweight 46 kg | (Japan) Emiko Konishi | def. | (Japan) Ayame | Decision (unanimous) | 3 | 3:00 | |

== RISE 193 ==
RISE 193
- Promotion: RISE
- Date: November 9, 2025
- Venue: Korakuen Hall
- City: Tokyo, Japan

RISE 193 was a kickboxing event held by RISE in Tokyo, Japan on November 9, 2025.

=== Fight Card ===
RISE 193
| Weight Class | | | | Method | Round | Time | Notes |
|---|---|---|---|---|---|---|---|
| Catchweight 55.5 kg | (Japan) Koki Osaki | def. | (Thailand) Wuttikorn Suannamtankiri | TKO (punches) | 3 | 2:16 | |
| Super Lightweight 65 kg | (Japan) Sota "Cerberus" Kimura | def. | (Japan) Yuki Tanaka | KO (right cross) | 1 | 0:24 | |
| Lightweight 63 kg | (Japan) Masahito Okuyama | def. | (Japan) Kiyoto Takahashi | Decision (unanimous) | 3 | 3:00 | |
| Lightweight 63 kg | (Japan) Hiroki Suzuki | def. | (Japan) Hiroto Yamaguchi | Decision (unanimous) | 3 | 3:00 | |
| Welterweight 67.5 kg | (Japan) Ryoya Inai | def. | (Thailand) Singphayak HamaGym | TKO (3 Knockdowns) | 2 | 2:59 | |
| Bantamweight 55 kg | (Japan) Ryoya Ito | def. | (Japan) Tsubasa | Decision (unanimous) | 3 | 3:00 | |
| Bantamweight 55 kg | (Japan) Atsuki Yamada | def. | (Japan) Musashi Matsushita | Decision (unanimous) | 3 | 3:00 | |
| Lightweight 63 kg | (Japan) Ryuki Yoshioka | def. | (Japan) Teleka∞ | Ext.R Decision (unanimous) | 4 | 3:00 | |
| Featherweight 57.5 kg | (Japan) Kazuhiro Matsuyama | def. | (Japan) Sho Sugimoto | Decision (unanimous) | 3 | 3:00 | |
| Bantamweight 55 kg | (Japan) Reiji | def. | (Japan) Ryu Matsunaga | Decision (unanimous) | 3 | 3:00 | |
| Catchweight 85 kg | (Democratic Republic of the Congo) Gunther Kalunda | def. | (Japan) Takahiro Kikutani | Decision (unanimous) | 3 | 3:00 | |
| Lightweight 63 kg | (Japan) Yuga Sakura | def. | (Japan) Mitsuki Gorichu Kanazawa | Decision (majority) | 3 | 3:00 | |

== RISE 194 ==
RISE 194
- Promotion: RISE
- Date: December 14, 2025
- Venue: Korakuen Hall
- City: Tokyo, Japan

RISE 194 was a kickboxing event held by RISE in Tokyo, Japan on December 14, 2025.

=== Background ===
A bantamweight bout between former RISE bantamweight champion Masahiko Suzuki and current RISE super flyweight champion Ryu Hanaoka was scheduled as the main event.

=== Fight Card ===
RISE 194
| Weight Class | | | | Method | Round | Time | Notes |
|---|---|---|---|---|---|---|---|
| Bantamweight 55 kg | (Japan) Ryu Hanaoka | def. | (Japan) Masahiko Suzuki | Decision (unanimous) | 3 | 3:00 | |
| Atomweight 46 kg | (Japan) Haruka Shimada | def. | (Japan) Koto Hiraoka | Decision (unanimous) | 5 | 3:00 | For the vacant RISE Queen Atomweight title |
| Super Flyweight 53 kg | (Japan) Jin Mandokoro | def. | (Japan) Shuri Sakayori | TKO (punches) | 2 | 1:50 | |
Koyuki Miyazaki retirement ceremony
| Flyweight 51.5 kg | (Japan) Reiya | draw. | (Japan) King Rikuto | Ext.R Decision (majority) | 4 | 3:00 | |
| Welterweight 67.5 kg | (Japan) KENTA | def. | (Japan) Chappy Yoshinuma | Decision (majority) | 3 | 3:00 | |
| Featherweight 57.5 kg | (Japan) Ryoga Terayama | def. | (Japan) Retsu Sashida | Decision (unanimous) | 3 | 3:00 | |
| Featherweight 57.5 kg | (Japan) Aoi Kadowaki | def. | (Japan) Momotaro | KO (right cross) | 1 | 2:57 | |
| Atomweight 46 kg | (Japan) Momoka Cinderella | def. | (Japan) Minori Kikuchi | Decision (unanimous) | 3 | 3:00 | |
| Women's Flyweight 52 kg | (Japan) Melty Kira | def. | (Japan) Manaka | Decision (unanimous) | 3 | 3:00 | |
| Super Flyweight 53 kg | (Japan) Renji Inoue | def. | (Japan) Kirato Konno | KO (left hook) | 2 | 2:36 | |

== See also ==
- 2025 in K-1
- 2025 in ONE Championship
- 2025 in Romanian kickboxing
- 2025 in Wu Lin Feng
- 2025 in Glory
