= Yuki Kasahara =

Japanese kickboxer (born 2001)

- Born: June 3, 2001 (age 25); Taitō, Tokyo, Japan
- Native name: 笠原友希
- Height: 1.75 m (5 ft 9 in)
- Weight: 60 kg (130 lb; 9.4 st)
- Style: Kickboxing
- Stance: Southpaw
- Fighting out of: Tokyo, Japan
- Team: Caesar Gym
- Years active: 2017-present

Kickboxing record
- Total: 42
- Wins: 36
- By knockout: 17
- Losses: 6
- By knockout: 4

Other information
- Notable relatives: Hiroki Kasahara (older brother)

Yuki Kasahara (笠原 友希, Kasahara Yūki; born June 3, 2001) is a Japanese kickboxer, currently competing in the super featherweight division of Shoot Boxing.

A professional competitor since 2017, he is a two-weight Shootboxing champion, having held the Japan Super Featherweight title since 2021, and the Japan Featherweight title between 2020 and 2021.

As of July 2022 he was the #6 ranked Bantamweight in the world by Combat Press.

== Career ==
=== Super bantamweight ===
==== Career beginnings ====
Kasahara made his professional debut against Pako Lai at Shoot Boxing 2017 act.2 on April 8, 2017. He won the fight by technical knockout midway through the first round, as Lai dislocated his left arm.

A month later, Kasahara was booked to face Genki Takeno at Shoot Boxing 2017 Young Cesar in Hanayashiki act.2 on May 13, 2017. He won the fight by unanimous decision, with all three judges scoring the bout 29–28 in his favor.

Kasahara faced his second foreign opponent, Kim So Hu, at Shoot Boxing 2017 Young Cesar in Hanayashiki act.3 on August 6, 2017. He won the fight by a first-round technical knockout, forcing Kim's corner to throw in the towel near the end of the round.

Kasahara faced Shuto Sato at Shoot Boxing 2017 act.4 on September 16, 2017, five weeks after his victory against Hu. He won the fight by unanimous decision, with scores of 30–26, 30–27 and 30–27.

Kasahara faced the WMC Japan super flyweight champion Koki Yamada in a 54.5 kg catchweight bout at Shoot Boxing 2017 Young Cesar in Hanayashiki act.4 on October 14, 2017. He won the fight by unanimous decision, with scores of 30–26, 30–25 and 30–25. Kasahara scored a shoot point with a head and arm throw in the first-round, and badly staggered Yamada with a flurry of punches near the end of the last round.

Kasahara faced Ryu, in his sixth and final fight of the year, at Shoot Boxing 2017 Young Cesar in Hanayashiki act.5 on December 17, 2017. He won the fight by unanimous decision. Kasahara scored two shoot points, one in the first and one in the third round.

Kasahara faced Keito Naito at Shoot Boxing 2018 act.1 on February 10, 2018. He knocked Naito down with a flurry of punches, before knocking him out with a right hook at the 2:48 minute mark of the first round.

Kasahara faced Genki Takeno at Shoot Boxing 2018 act.2 on April 1, 2018. He won the fight by majority decision. Two of the judges scored the fight 30–29 and 30–28 for Kasahara, while the third judge scored it as an even 29–29 draw.

==== Shootboxing super bantamweight tournament ====
Kasahara faced the fourth ranked Shootboxing super bantamweight Ryota Naito at Shoot Boxing 2018 act.2 on June 10, 2018, in the quarterfinals of the Shootboxing tournament. He won the fight by unanimous decision, with two scorecards of 30–27 and one scorecard of 30–28.

Kasahara faced the second ranked Shootboxing super bantamweight Kyo Kawakami in the co-main event of Shoot Boxing 2018 act.4 on September 15, 2018. He won the semifinal bout of the tournament by a first-round knockout, stopping Kawakami at the very end of the first round.

His 10–0 undefeated streak earned Kasahara the #2 ranking in the division, as well as the right to face Seiki Ueyama in the finals of the Shootboxing super bantamweight tournament, with the vacant title on the line. The bout was booked as the co-main event of Shoot Boxing S-cup 65 kg World Tournament 2018 on November 18, 2018. Ueyama handed Kasahara his first professional loss, stopping him with a flurry of punches at the 0:56 minute mark of the third round.

Kasahara fought twice more at super bantamweight, before moving up to featherweight (-57.5 kg). He first stopped Shota Tezuka with a right hook in the first round at Shoot Boxing 2019 act.2 on April 27, 2019, which he followed up with a third-round technical knockout of Eisaku Ogasawara at Shoot Boxing 2019 act.3 on June 23, 2019.

=== Move to featherweight ===
==== Early featherweight career ====
After successfully rebounded from his first professional loss, Kasahara moved up to featherweight to face Ponchan Bravegym at Shoot Boxing 2019 act.4 on September 28, 2019. He won the fight by unanimous decision, with scores of 30–27, 29–28 and 30–28.

Kasahara faced Lertchai Aor.Saensuk at Shoot Boxing GROUND ZERO TOKYO 2019 on December 3, 2019. He won the fight by a third-round technical knockout, stopping Lertchai with a flurry of punches in the final minute of the last round.

Kasahara faced Kaito Sakaguchi at Shoot Boxing 2020 act.1 on February 15, 2020. He won the fight by majority decision, after two extension rounds were fought.

==== Kasahara vs. Nasukawa ====
On June 23, 2019, Kasahara was booked in the highest profile bout of his career up to that point, as it was announced that he would face the Rizin FF flyweight and RISE World featherweight champion Tenshin Nasukawa at the July 12, 2019 Rise on Abema event. The non-title bout was broadcast by Abema and was held in front of an empty arena, due to measures implemented to combat the COVID-19 pandemic. Kasahara lost the fight by a first-round stoppage, as he was knocked down three times by the midway point of the opening round, which resulted in a technical knockout victory for Nasukawa.

==== Shootboxing Japan Featherweight champion ====
Kasahara, who was at the time the top ranked Shootboxing featherweight, was booked to face the #4 ranked featherweight contender Shota Tezuka for the vacant title at Shoot Boxing 2020 act.2 on September 19, 2020. He won the fight by a fourth-round technical knockout. Both fighters traded knockdowns in the second round, while Kasahara scored the sole shoot point in the first round.

Kasahara faced Shogo Kuriaki in a non-title bout at Shoot Boxing 2021 act.2 on February 7, 2021. He won the fight by unanimous decision.

Kasahara faced Shuto Miyazaki in another non-title bout at Shoot Boxing 2021 act.2 on April 10, 2021. Miyazaki failed to make weight before the fight, coming in at 58 kg, 0.5 kg above the featherweight limit of 57.5 kg. Kasahara won the fight by unanimous decision.

Kasahara faced Pon SirilakGym at Shoot Boxing 2021 act.4 on September 4, 2021, in his final fight at featherweight. Despite a poor start to the fight, which saw him get knocked down with a left hook in the first round, Kasahara rallied to win the fight by a second-round technical knockout.

=== Move to super featherweight ===
Kasahara was booked to face the second ranked Shootboxing super featherweight contender Shota Tezuka for the vacant title at Shoot Boxing 2021 Champion Carnival on December 26, 2021, in his first fight at super featherweight. He won the fight by unanimous decision. Two judges scored the bout 49–46 in his favor, while the third judge scored it 50–45 for Kasahara.

Kasahara made his promotional debut with Rizin FF against Motoki at Rizin 34 – Osaka on March 20, 2022. He won the fight by a first-round knockout, stopping Motoki with a flying knee in the last minute of the opening round.

On May 19, 2022, it was announced that Kasahara would face the reigning Krush Super Featherweight champion Chihiro Nakajima in a cross-promotional fight on June 19, 2022. The bout was scheduled for the undercard of THE MATCH 2022, an Abema pay per view headlined by Takeru Segawa and Tenshin Nasukawa. Kasahara won the fight by unanimous decision, with scores of 30–28, 30–28 and 30–27. He scored the sole knockdown of the fight in the third round, when he dropped Nakajima with a right hook.

Kasahara faced the second ranked RISE super featherweight contender Hyuma Hitachi at SHOOT BOXING 2022 act.4 on September 14, 2022. He lost the fight by a second-round knockout.

Kasahara faced the third ranked RISE super featherweight contender Yusaku Ishizuki at RISE WORLD SERIES / SHOOTBOXING-KINGS on December 25, 2022. He won the fight by unanimous decision, with all three judges scoring the bout 30–25 for him. He knocked Ishizuki down in both the second and third rounds, both times with a left straight.

Kasahara faced TAaaaCHAN at SHOOT BOXING 2023 act.1 on February 12, 2023. He won the fight by unanimous decision, with scores of 30–29, 30–29 and 30–28.

Kasahara faced Pomlop Looksuan at SHOOT BOXING 2023 act.2 on April 30, 2023. He won the fight by unanimous decision, with scores of 30–27, 30–24 and 30–24.

Kasahara faced the former Rajadamnern Stadium super bantamweight champion Singdam SunriseGym at SHOOT BOXING 2023 act.4 on September 23, 2023. He won the fight by a first-round knockout.

Kasahara faced Sunay Miftar at SHOOT BOXING 2023 Series Final on November 14, 2023. He won the fight by a third-round technical knockout.

Kasahara faced Son Jae Min at SHOOT BOXING 2024 act.1 on February 10, 2024. He won the fight by a second-round knockout, after being knocked down in the first.

Kasahara faced Phetsimok P.K.SaenchaiMuaythaiGym at ONE Friday Fights 59 on April 19, 2024. He won the fight by a first-round knockout.

Kasahara faced Phetmorakot Teeded99 at SHOOT BOXING 2024 act.4 on August 17, 2024. He won the fight by a first-round knockout.

Kasahara made his ONE Championship debut against Sonrak Fairtex at ONE Friday Fights 84 on October 25, 2024. He lost the fight by unanimous decision.

Kasahara faced GUMP at SHOOTBOXING GROUND ZERO TOKYO 2024 on December 26, 2024. He won the fight by unanimous decision, with scores of 29—27, 29—28 and 30—27.

Kasahara faced Panuwat TGT in the quarterfinals of the 2025 RISE World Series at RISE ELDORADO 2025 on March 29, 2025. He won the fight by a second-round technical knockout.

== Championships and accomplishments ==
=== Amateur ===
- 2013 Shoot Boxing All Japan Junior -45 kg Championship
- 2014 All Japan Shoot Boxing Junior -50 kg Championship
- 2015 Muay Thai Open -50 kg Championship
- 2015 Shoot Boxing All Japan Junior -50 kg Championship
- 2016 Shoot Boxing All Japan Junior -50 kg Championship

=== Professional ===
- SHOOT BOXING
  - 2020 Shoot Boxing Japan Featherweight (-57.5 kg) Championship
  - 2021 Shoot Boxing Japan Super Featherweight (-60 kg) Championship
- International Sport Kickboxing Association
  - 2026 ISKA K-1 World Super-lightweight (-63.5kg) Championship

== Fight record ==
Professional Kickboxing record
36 Wins (17 (T)KO's), 6 Losses
Date	Result	Opponent	Event	Location	Method	Round	Time
2026-10-25	Win	(France) Soheil Dridi	GOAT Kickboxing Fes. 3	Tokyo, Japan	Decision (Unanimous)	3	3:00
Won the vacant ISKA K-1 World Super-lightweight (-63.5kg) Championship.
2026-08-22	Win	(Thailand) Lom-Isan ReonGym	SHOOT BOXING 2026 act.4	Tokyo, Japan	Decision (Unanimous)	3	3:00
2026-05-28	Loss	(Japan) Taito Gunji	Kickboxing Fes. GOAT 2	Tokyo, Japan	Decision (Unanimous)	3	3:00
2026-02-14	Win	(Brazil) Thalison Ferreira	SHOOT BOXING 2026 act.1	Tokyo, Japan	KO (Knee to the body)	2	1:09
2025-11-24	Win	(Thailand) Maemmot Sor Salacheep	SHOOT BOXING 40th Anniversary	Tokyo, Japan	Decision (Unanimous)	3	3:00
2025-06-21	Loss	(Japan) Kan Nakamura	RISE WORLD SERIES 2025 Yokohama - 61.5 kg World Series, Semifinals	Yokohama, Japan	Ext.R KO (High kick)	4	1:48
2025-03-29	Win	(Thailand) Panuwat TGT	RISE ELDORADO 2025 - 61.5 kg World Series, Quarterfinals	Tokyo, Japan	KO (Left cross)	2	2:48
2024-12-26	Win	(Japan) GUMP	SHOOTBOXING GROUND ZERO TOKYO 2024	Tokyo, Japan	Decision (Unanimous)	3	3:00
2024-10-25	Loss	(Myanmar) Sonrak Fairtex	ONE Friday Fights 84, Lumpinee Stadium	Bangkok, Thailand	Decision (Unanimous)	3	3:00
2024-08-17	Win	(Thailand) Phetmorakot Teeded99	SHOOT BOXING 2024 act.4	Tokyo, Japan	KO (Knee to the body)	1	2:27
2024-04-19	Win	(Thailand) Phetsimok P.K.SaenchaiMuaythai	ONE Friday Fights 59, Lumpinee Stadium	Bangkok, Thailand	KO (Punches)	1	1:55
2024-02-10	Win	(South Korea) Son Jae Min	SHOOT BOXING 2024 act.1	Tokyo, Japan	KO (Left high kick)	2	1:15
2023-11-14	Win	(North Macedonia) Sunay Miftar	SHOOT BOXING 2023 Series Final	Tokyo, Japan	TKO (Doctor stoppage)	3	1:05
2023-09-23	Win	(Thailand) Singdam SunriseGym	SHOOT BOXING 2023 act.4	Tokyo, Japan	KO (Straight to the body)	1	2:43
2023-04-30	Win	(Thailand) Pomrob Looksuan	SHOOT BOXING 2023 act.2	Tokyo, Japan	Decision (Unanimous)	3	3:00
2023-02-12	Win	(Japan) TAaaaCHAN	SHOOT BOXING 2023 act.1	Tokyo, Japan	Decision (Unanimous)	3	3:00
2022-12-25	Win	(Japan) Yusaku Ishizuki	RISE WORLD SERIES / SHOOTBOXING-KINGS 2022	Tokyo, Japan	Decision (Unanimous)	3	3:00
2022-09-17	Loss	(Japan) Hyuma Hitachi	SHOOT BOXING 2022 act.4	Tokyo, Japan	KO (Right hook)	2	1:12
2022-06-19	Win	(Japan) Chihiro Nakajima	THE MATCH 2022	Tokyo, Japan	Decision (Unanimous)	3	3:00
2022-03-20	Win	(Japan) Motoki	Rizin 34 – Osaka	Osaka, Japan	KO (Flying knee)	1	2:24
2021-12-26	Win	(Japan) Shota Tezuka	Shoot Boxing 2021 Champion Carnival	Tokyo, Japan	Decision (Unanimous)	5	3:00
Wins the vacant Shoot Boxing Japan Super Featherweight (-60 kg) title.
2021-09-04	Win	(Thailand) Pon SirilakGym	Shoot Boxing 2021 act.4	Tokyo, Japan	TKO (3 knockdowns)	2	2:20
2021-04-10	Win	(Japan) Shuto Miyazaki	Shoot Boxing 2021 act.2	Tokyo, Japan	Decision (Unanimous)	3	3:00
2021-02-07	Win	(Japan) Shogo Kuriaki	Shoot Boxing 2021 act.2	Tokyo, Japan	Decision (Unanimous)	3	3:00
2020-09-19	Win	(Japan) Shota Tezuka	Shoot Boxing 2020 act.2	Tokyo, Japan	TKO (Punches)	4	1:07
Wins the vacant Shoot Boxing Japan Featherweight (-57.5 kg) title.
2020-07-12	Loss	(Japan) Tenshin Nasukawa	Rise on Abema	Tokyo, Japan	TKO (3 Knockdowns)	1	1:30
2020-02-15	Win	(Japan) Kaito Sakaguchi	Shoot Boxing 2020 act.1	Tokyo, Japan	2nd Ext.R Decision (Majority)	5	3:00
2019-12-03	Win	(Thailand) Lertchai Aor.Saensuk	Shoot Boxing GROUND ZERO TOKYO 2019	Tokyo, Japan	TKO (Ref. stoppage/Punches)	3	2:23
2019-09-28	Win	(Thailand) Ponchan Bravegym	Shoot Boxing 2019 act.4	Tokyo, Japan	Decision (Unanimous)	3	3:00
2019-06-23	Win	(Japan) Eisaku Ogasawara	Shoot Boxing 2019 act.3	Tokyo, Japan	TKO (Doctor Stoppage)	3	0:46
2019-04-27	Win	(Japan) Shota Tezuka	Shoot Boxing 2019 act.2	Tokyo, Japan	KO (Right hook)	1	1:19
2018-11-18	Loss	(Japan) Seiki Ueyama	Shoot Boxing S-cup 65 kg World Tournament 2018	Tokyo, Japan	TKO (Ref. stop./Punches)	3	0:56
For the vacant SHOOT BOXING Japan Super Bantamweight (-55kg) title.
2018-09-15	Win	(Japan) Kyo Kawakami	Shoot Boxing 2018 act.4	Tokyo, Japan	KO (Left cross)	1	3:00
2018-06-10	Win	(Japan) Ryota Naito	Shoot Boxing 2018 act.3	Tokyo, Japan	Decision (Unanimous)	3	3:00
2018-04-01	Win	(Japan) Genki Takeno	Shoot Boxing 2018 act.2	Tokyo, Japan	Decision (Majority)	3	3:00
2018-02-10	Win	(Japan) Keito Naito	Shoot Boxing 2018 act.1	Tokyo, Japan	KO (Right Hook)	1	2:48
2017-12-17	Win	(Japan) Ryu	Shoot Boxing 2017 Young Cesar in Hanayashiki act.5	Tokyo, Japan	Decision (Unanimous)	3	3:00
2017-10-14	Win	(Japan) Koki Yamada	Shoot Boxing 2017 Young Cesar in Hanayashiki act.4	Tokyo, Japan	Decision (Unanimous)	3	3:00
2017-09-16	Win	(Japan) Shuto Sato	Shoot Boxing 2017 act.4	Tokyo, Japan	Decision (Unanimous)	3	3:00
2017-08-06	Win	(Korea) Kim So Hu	Shoot Boxing 2017 Young Cesar in Hanayashiki act.3	Tokyo, Japan	TKO (Corner stoppage)	1	
2017-05-13	Win	(Japan) Genki Takeno	Shoot Boxing 2017 Young Cesar in Hanayashiki act.2	Tokyo, Japan	Decision (Unanimous)	3	3:00
2017-04-08	Win	(Hong Kong) Pako Lai	Shoot Boxing 2017 act.2	Tokyo, Japan	TKO (Arm injury)	1	1:30
Legend: Win Loss Draw/No contest Notes

=== Amateur record ===
Amateur Kickboxing Record
Date	Result	Opponent	Event	Location	Method	Round	Time
2016-10-09	Win	(Japan) Taichi Tsuzuki	Young Caesar in Hanayashiki act.4	Tokyo, Japan	Decision (Unanimous)	3	2:00
2016-08-21	Win	(Japan) Taichi Isogai	Young Caesar in Hanayashiki act.3	Tokyo, Japan	Decision (Unanimous)	3	2:00
2016-06-18	Win	(Japan) Kazuya Ueda	Young Caesar in Hanayashiki act.2, U-16 Tournament Final	Tokyo, Japan	Decision (Unanimous)	3	2:00
2016-06-18	Win	(Japan) Ryuuto Nakamura	Young Caesar in Hanayashiki act.2, U-16 Tournament Semi Final	Tokyo, Japan	Decision (Majority)	3	2:00
2016-04-16	Win	(Japan) Kyosuke Yamaguchi	Young Caesar in Hanayashiki act.1	Tokyo, Japan	Decision (Majority)	3	2:00
2016-01-24	Win	(Japan) Kaito Sakaguchi	All Japan Shoot Boxing Amateur	Tokyo, Japan	Decision (Unanimous)	2	2:00
Wins Amateur Shoot Boxing All Japan -50kg title
2015-09-27	Win	(Japan) Kazuya Ueda	9th All Japan Amateur Shootboxing Championship	Tokyo, Japan			
Wins All Japan Shootboxing Amateur -45kg title.
2015-06-22	Win	(Japan) Kyosuke Yamaguchi	Muay Thai Open Amateur 31	Tokyo, Japan			
Wins Muay Thai Open Amateur -50kg title.
2014-12-21	Win	(Japan) Ryoga Matsumoto	All Japan Amateur Shoot Boxing	Japan	TKO	1	
Wins Amateur Shoot Boxing All Japan -50kg title
2014-06-29	Win	(Japan) Hotaru Shigematsu	Amateur Shootboxing Kansai	Osaka, Japan	TKO	1	
2014-06-29	Loss	(Japan) Kyo Kawakami	Amateur Shootboxing Kansai	Osaka, Japan	Ext.R Decision (Unanimous)	2	2:00
2013-11-16	Win	(Japan) Toma Maezono	Shootboxing GROUND ZERO TOKYO 2013, All Japan Amateur Shootboxing Final	Tokyo, Japan	Decision (Unanimous)	1	2:00
Wins All Japan Shootboxing Amateur -45kg title.
2013-02-10	Win	(Japan) Kisho Inoue	SHOOT BOXING Amateur	Tokyo, Japan	KO	1	
Legend: Win Loss Draw/No contest Notes

== See also ==
- List of male kickboxers
