= Chan Hyung Lee =

South Korean kickboxer (born 1992)

- Born: August 11, 1992 (age 34); Incheon, South Korea
- Native name: 이찬형
- Other names: Korean Devil
- Height: 1.67 m (5 ft 5 1/2 in)
- Weight: 61.0 kg (134.5 lb; 9.61 st)
- Division: Bantamweight
- Style: Kyeok Too Ki
- Stance: Orthodox
- Fighting out of: Incheon, South Korea
- Team: RAON GYM
- Years active: 2009 - present

Kickboxing record
- Total: 41
- Wins: 25
- By knockout: 10
- Losses: 15
- By knockout: 1
- Draws: 1

Chan Hyung Lee (Korean: 이찬형; born August 11, 1992) is a South Korean kickboxer. He is the former RISE Super Featherweight champion.

== Kickboxing career ==
=== Early career ===
Lee made his professional debut against Chung Woo Chee in June 2009, winning by decision. He went on to amass a 7–2 record, including a notable victory over Genji Umeno. On the back of these wins, Lee was given a chance to fight Samuel Hadzima at Simply The Best 6 for the WKN Intercontinental Lightweight title. He defeated Hadzima by decision.

=== RISE ===
==== RISE Super Featherweight title reign ====
After this title win, Lee would go on to win five of his next eight fights before signing with RISE in 2017. In his promotional debut, Lee fought Yuki at RISE 118 and won by second-round knockout. In his next fight, he challenged Koudai Nobe for the RISE Super Featherweight title and won by unanimous decision. Lee's winning streak was snapped at RISE 122 when he lost to Hideki by decision.

Lee was scheduled to fight Hikaru Machida at RISE 125. He won by unanimous decision. Lee extended his winning streak with stoppage wins of Hikaru Machida and Yosuke Morii. He then fought a rematch with Yuki at Rise World Series 2019, and won the rematch by unanimous decision.

At the KNOCK OUT 2019 SPRING event, Lee fought Yodlekpet Or. Pitisak for the KNOCK OUT 135 lbs title. Yodlekpet won the fight by unanimous decision. Lee then fought Genji Umeno, for the third time in his career, in the semifinal bout of the 2019 RISE World Series. Umeno won the fight by decision. After losing to Kento Haraguchi in September 2019, Lee fought Suakim PK Saenchaimuaythaigym in December 2019, for the Battle of Muay Thai Super Lightweight title. Suakim won the fight by a third-round TKO.

Lee faced the interim RISE super featherweight champion Kazuma in his first title defense at RISE 160 on July 29, 2022, following a three-year absence from competition. He won the fight by a fourth-round technical knockout. Lee was knocked down in the first round, but was able to build back into the fight by utilizing body shots and low kicks.

Lee faced the #3 ranked RISE lightweight Kan Nakamura in a super lightweight (62.5 kg) bout at RISE World Series 2022 on October 15, 2022. He won the fight by a second-round technical knockout, as Nakamura was unable to beat the count following a knockdown.

Lee made his second RISE Super Featherweight title defense against the #1 ranked RISE contender Hyuma Hitachi at RISE 164 on January 28, 2023. He retained the title by unanimous decision, after an extra sixth round was contested, as the bout was ruled a majority draw after the first five rounds were fought.

Lee faced Yuma Yamaguchi in a lightweight open finger glove bout at RISE World Series 2023 - 1st Round on July 2, 2023. He won the fight by a first-round knockout, flooring Yamaguchi with a left hook, which left him unable to rise from the canvas.

Lee faced Hideki at RISE World Series 2023 - 2nd Round on August 26, 2023, in the latter's retirement bout. Lee lost the fight by unanimous decision, with three scorecards of 30–27.

Lee made his third RISE Super Featherweight title defense against the former K-1 Super Featherweight champion Taiga at RISE 175 on January 14, 2024. He lost the fight by unanimous decision, with scores of 50–49, 50–48 and 50–47.

==== Post title reign ====
Lee faced Panuwat TGT at RISE WORLD SERIES 2024 Final on December 21, 2024. He lost the fight by split decision, after an extra fourth round was contested.

Lee faced the RISE Lightweight (-63kg) champion Kan Nakamura in the quarterfinals of the 2025 RISE World Series at RISE ELDORADO 2025 on March 29, 2025. He lost the fight by unanimous decision.

== Championships and awards ==
- World Kickboxing Network
  - 2015 WKN Intercontinental Lightweight Champion
- RISE
  - 2017 RISE Super Featherweight -60kg Champion
    - two successful title defenses
- KNOCK OUT
  - 2019 KNOCK OUT Asia Lightweight Tournament Runner-up

== Fight record ==
Kickboxing record
25 Wins (10 (T)KOs), 15 Losses, 1 Draw
Date	Result	Opponent	Event	Location	Method	Round	Time
2026-07-12	Loss	(Japan) GUMP	RISE 200	Tokyo, Japan	Decision (Majority)	3	3:00
2025-03-29	Loss	(Japan) Kan Nakamura	RISE ELDORADO 2025 - 61.5 kg World Series, Quarterfinals	Tokyo, Japan	Decision (Unanimous)	3	3:00
2024-12-21	Loss	(Thailand) Panuwat TGT	RISE WORLD SERIES 2024 Final	Chiba, Japan	Ext.R Decision (Split)	4	3:00
2024-01-14	Loss	(Japan) Taiga	RISE 175	Tokyo, Japan	Decision (Unanimous)	5	3:00
Loses the RISE Super Featherweight (-60kg) title.
2023-08-26	Loss	(Japan) Hideki	RISE World Series 2023 - 2nd Round	Tokyo, Japan	Decision (Unanimous)	3	3:00
2023-07-02	Win	(Japan) Yuma Yamaguchi	RISE World Series 2023 - 1st Round	Osaka, Japan	KO (Left hook)	1	1:11
2023-01-28	Win	(Japan) Hyuma Hitachi	RISE 164	Tokyo, Japan	Ext.R Decision (Unanimous)	6	3:00
Defends the RISE Super Featherweight title.
2022-10-15	Win	(Japan) Kan Nakamura	RISE WORLD SERIES 2022	Tokyo, Japan	TKO (Punches)	2	1:39
2022-07-29	Win	(Japan) Kazuma	RISE 160	Tokyo, Japan	TKO (Referee stoppage)	4	2:55
Defends the RISE Super Featherweight title.
2019-12-08	Loss	(Thailand) Suakim PK Saenchaimuaythaigym	BOM 2-6～THE Battle Of Muaythai SEASON II vol.6	Tokyo, Japan	TKO (retirement)	3	3:00
For the Battle of Muay Thai Super Lightweight title
2019-09-16	Loss	(Japan) Kento Haraguchi	Rise World Series 2019 Final Round	Chiba, Japan	Decision (Unanimous)	3	3:00
2019-07-21	Loss	(Japan) Genji Umeno	Rise World Series 2019 Semi Finals	Tokyo, Japan	Decision (Unanimous)	3	3:00
2019-04-29	Loss	(Thailand) Yodlekpet Or. Pitisak	KNOCK OUT 2019 SPRING: THE FUTURE IS IN THE RING	Tokyo, Japan	Decision (Unanimous)	5	3:00
For the KNOCK OUT Lightweight Asian Tournament and 135lbs title.
2019-03-10	Win	(Japan) Yuki	Rise World Series 2019, First Round	Tokyo, Japan	Decision (Unanimous)	3	3:00
2019-02-11	Win	(Japan) Yosuke Morii	KNOCK OUT 2019 WINTER	Tokyo, Japan	TKO (Punches)	2	1:21
2018-12-09	Win	(Japan) Hikaru Machida	KING OF KNOCK OUT 2018	Tokyo, Japan	TKO (Doctor Stoppage)	4	2:12
2018-06-17	Win	(Japan) Hikaru Machida	RISE 125	Tokyo, Japan	Decision (Unanimous)	3	3:00
2018-02-04	Loss	(Japan) Hideki	RISE 122	Tokyo, Japan	Decision (Unanimous)	3	3:00
2017-11-23	Win	(Japan) Koudai Nobe	RISE 121	Tokyo, Japan	Decision (Unanimous)	5	3:00
Wins the RISE Super Featherweight title.
2017-07-17	Win	(Japan) Yuki	RISE 118	Tokyo, Japan	TKO (3 Knockdowns)	2	2:58
2017-05-14	Win	(Thailand) Rungravee Sasiprapa	ICX Seoul	Seoul, South Korea	KO (Left uppercut)	1	0:57
2017-03-26	Win	(Thailand) Tombship Yontong	MKF Ultimate Victory 03	Incheon, South Korea	Decision	3	3:00
2017-03-05	Win	(Japan) Kodai Nobe	RISE 116	Tokyo, Japan	KO (Left hook)	2	0:28
2016-10-30	Loss	(China) Wang Wenfeng	Kunlun Fight 54	Hubei, China	Decision (Unanimous)	3	3:00
2016-07-02	Loss	(China) Deng Zeqi	Glory of Heroes 3	China	Decision (Unanimous)	3	3:00
2016-04-23	Loss	(Japan) Keijiro Miyakoshi	Kunlun Fight 43	China	Ext.R Decision (Unanimous)	4	
2016-01-23	Win	(China) Jiao Daobo	Kunlun Fight 37	China	Decision (Unanimous)	3	3:00
2015-11-14	Win	(Thailand) Daugnkwan Fobbolitox	MKF Ultimate Victory 2015	Incheon, South Korea	KO		
2015-10-03	Win	(Slovakia) Samuel Hadzima	Simply The Best 6	Poprad, Slovakia	Decision	5	3:00
Wins the WKN Intercontinental Lightweight title.
2015-08-29	Win	(Korea) Son Joon Oh	MAX FC 01	South Korea	Decision (Unanimous)	3	3:00
2015-08-01	Loss	(Japan) Motochika Hanada	Blade FC 2	Tokyo, Japan	Decision	3	3:00
2013-03-20	Loss	(Japan) Genji Umeno	RISE 92	Tokyo, Japan	Decision (Unanimous)	3	3:00
2013-02-02	Win	(China) Li Ning	K-1 Korea Max 2013 Khan vs Wulinfeng	South Korea	Decision	3	3:00
2012-12-02	Win	(Japan) Daiki Nagashima	RISE/M-1MC ～INFINITY～	Tokyo, Japan	KO (Left hook)	2	0:47
2012-10-14	Win	(Japan) Genji Umeno	K-1 World Grand Prix 2012 in Tokyo final 16	Tokyo, Japan	Decision (Unanimous)	3	3:00
2012-04-21	Win	(South Korea) Howlam		South Korea	Decision	3	3:00
2011-06-17	Win	(South Korea) Kim Jin-hyeok	RISE Korea	Seoul, South Korea	Decision	3	3:00
2009-05-31	Win	(South Korea) Chung Woo Chee		South Korea			
Legend: Win Loss Draw/No contest Notes

== See also ==
- List of male kickboxers
