= Kazuki Osaki =

Japanese kickboxer (born 1996)

- Born: August 28, 1996 (age 30); Nagoya, Aichi Prefecture, Japan
- Other names: Kazuki Wor.Wanchai; Kazuki Oishigym; Kazuki ExcidiconGYM
- Height: 1.60 m (5 ft 3 in)
- Weight: 53 kg (117 lb; 8.3 st)
- Division: Flyweight
- Style: Muay Thai, Kickboxing
- Stance: Orthodox
- Fighting out of: Nagoya, Japan
- Team: Oishi Gym
- Years active: 2014 - present

Kickboxing record
- Total: 59
- Wins: 49
- By knockout: 25
- Losses: 7
- By knockout: 0
- Draws: 2
- No contests: 1

Other information
- Spouse: Misaki Morita
- Notable relatives: Koki Osaki (brother)

Kazuki Osaki (大﨑 一貴, Osaki Kazuki; born August 28, 1996) is a Japanese kickboxer and Muay Thai fighter, currently signed with RISE, where he is a former RISE Super Flyweight (-53 kg) World champion and RISE Super Flyweight (-53 kg) champion.

As of May 2025, he is ranked as the world's best flyweight (-53 kg) and third-best pound-for-pound kickboxer by Beyond Kickboxing and as the second best strawweight (-54 kg) and eighth-best pound-for-pound kickboxer by Combat Press.

== Personal life ==
In October 2024, it was announced that he married MISAKI, the current Shootboxing Women's Atomweight (-46 kg) champion.

== Martial arts career ==
=== Muay thai career ===
Osaki made his professional debut against Yuzuki Sakai at MUAYTHAI WINDY SUPER FIGHT. He won the fight by unanimous decision. He won his next fight against Kaito Gibu as well, before suffering his first professional loss to Banfus Hunter at MUAYTHAI WINDY SUPER FIGHT vol.17. Osaki would go on to amass a 7-1-2 (1) record, before fighting Yuya Kosaka for the WMC Japan Flyweight title at Muay Lok 2017 1st. He won the fight by unanimous decision.

Osaki won his next six fights, including four straight victories at the Lumpinee Stadium. He was scheduled to defend his WMC title for the first time against Taiga Nakayama at The Battle Of Muaythai 17. Osaki won the fight by majority decision. In his next fight he won the Lumpinee Stadium of Japan Flyweight title, with a knockout of Tatsuya Hibata. He afterwards fought Kiew Parunchai for the Lumpinee Stadium 112 lbs belt, but lost the fight by decision.

=== Transition to kickboxing ===
==== KNOCK OUT ====
Osaki made his KNOCK OUT debut against Tatsuya Noto at KNOCK OUT SUMMER FES.2018 on August 19, 2018, in the quarterfinals of the 2018 flyweight tournament, held to crown the King of Knock Out flyweight champion. He won the fight by a second-round technical knockout, knocking him down twice before the referee waved the fight off. Osaki advanced to the tournament semifinals, held at KNOCK OUT 2018 cross over on October 7, 2018, where he faced Yoshiho Tane. He won the fight by a fifth-round technical knockout. Osaki faced Issei Ishii at KING OF KNOCK OUT 2018 on December 9, 2018, in the finals of the tournament. He lost the fight by a narrow majority decision. Two of the judges scored the fight 49–48 for Ishii, while the third judge scored it as an even 49–49 draw.

Osaki made his fourth appearance with the promotion against Chokdee PK.Saenchaimuaythaigym at KNOCK OUT 2019 WINTER on February 11, 2019. He lost the fight by unanimous decision, with two scorecards of 49–46 and one scorecard of 48–46.

==== HOOST CUP ====
Osaki returned to Hoost Cup to face KING Takeshi at HOOST CUP KINGS NAGOYA 6 on May 26, 2019. He won the fight by unanimous decision, after an extra fourth round was contested.

Osaki faced the former two-time Krush Super Bantamweight champion Shota Takiya at Rizin 18 - Nagoya on August 18, 2019. He won the fight by a wide unanimous decision. Osaki knocked Takiya down twice, first with a left hook to the body in the second round and the second time with a right hook in the third round.

Osaki faced Koudai Hirayama at HOOST CUP KINGS OSAKA 4 on October 27, 2019. He won the fight by a close majority decision, with scores of 30–29, 29–29 and 30–29.

Osaki faced Konesarn Acegym at Norainu Matsuri 6 Shin Kiba 1st Ring on January 19, 2020. He stopped Konesarn with low kicks at the 2:53 minute mark of the opening round.

=== RISE ===
==== Early promotional career ====
Osaki made his RISE debut against Kazane, who entered the fight on a five-fight winning streak, at RISE 137 on February 23, 2020. He won the fight by unanimous decision. Two of the judges scored the fight 29–27 in his favor, while the third judge awarded all three rounds of the bout to him. Osaki knocked his opponent down with a right hook midway through the second round.

Osaki faced the #1 ranked RISE super flyweight contender Jin Mandokoro at RISE 140 on July 19, 2020, in a title eliminator bout. The fight was ruled a majority decision draw after the first three rounds were contested, with one judge scoring the bout 29–28 for Osaki. Osaki was awarded a majority decision win after an extra fourth round was contested.

==== Super flyweight champion ====
Osaki, who as at the time the top ranked contender, challenged Toki Tamaru for the RISE Super Flyweight (-53 kg) Championship at RISE 142 on September 4, 2020. Due to measures implemented to combat the COVID-19 pandemic, only a limited audience of 700 people was allowed into the Korakuen Hall, where the title bout took place. Osaki captured the title by unanimous decision. Two judges scored the fight 49–47 in his favor, while the third judge scored it 50–47 for him.

Osaki faced the Shootboxing Japan bantamweight champion Kyo Kawakami in a non-title bout at RISE 143 on November 14, 2020. He beat Kawakami by unanimous decision, with scores of 30–29, 29–28 and 30–28.

Osaki faced the WMC and WBC Muaythai bantamweight champion Ikko in a non-title bout at RISE 146 on February 23, 2021. He won the fight by unanimous decision, with two scorecards of 29–28 and one scorecard of 30–28. Osaki was next expected to face Shiro at "Rise on Abema" on May 15, 2021, in a bantamweight (-55 kg) bout. His brother Koki Osaki tested positive for COVID-19 on May 12, which led to the fight being scrapped as a preventive measure.

Osaki faced Issei Ishii at RISE WORLD SERIES 2021 Osaka on July 18, 2021, in the quarterfinals of the 2021 RISE Dead or Alive 53 kg tournament. The pair previously fought on December 9, 2018, with Ishii winning by majority decision. Osaki won the rematch by unanimous decision, with scores of 29–28, 29–28 and 29–27. He scored the sole knockdown of the fight in the second round, as he dropped Ishii with a left hook. Advancing to the tournament semifinals, Osaki was expected to face Shiro at RISE WORLD SERIES 2021 Yokohama on September 23, 2021, in the tournament semifinals. Osaki withdrew from the bout with an ankle injury on August 24, and was replaced by his brother Koki Osaki.

Osaki was booked to face Kanta Tabuchi in a non-title bout at RISE 156 on March 27, 2022. He won the fight by majority decision, with scores of 30–29, 30–29 and 30–30. Osaki then faced Sanchai TeppenGym in another non-title bout at RISE WORLD SERIES 2022 Osaka on August 21, 2022. He won the fight by a third-round knockout.

Osaki made his first RISE super flyweight (-53 kg) title defense against the 2021 RISE super flyweight Dead or Alive Tournament winner and the number one ranked contender Kazane at RISE Word Series 2022 on October 15, 2022. He won the fight by a narrowly contested majority decision, with scores of 50–49, 48–48 and 49–48.

Osaki was booked to face Mangkon Boomdeksean in a non-title bout at RISE 164 on January 28, 2023. He won the fight by a third-round technical knockout. Osaki knocked Mangkon down three times inside of single round, which forced the referee to stop the contest.

==== RISE World Series ====
Osaki faced Javier Cecilio at RISE EL DORADO 2023 on March 26, 2023. He won the fight by a first-round knockout. During his post-fight speech, Osaki asked for a fight with one of the flyweight ISKA world champions, as well as a place in the upcoming RISE -54 kg World Series tournament. His wish was granted, as he was booked to face Nicolas Rivas for the vacant ISKA Oriental rules World Flyweight (-53.5 kg) championship at RISE 167 on April 21, 2023. Osaki stopped Rivas with a spinning heel kick 28 seconds into the fourth round.

Osaki was expected to face the ISKA K-1 Super Flyweight (-55 kg) World champion Frederico Cordeiro in the quarterfinals of the 2023 RISE -54 kg World Series, held on July 2, 2023. Corderiro withdrew with an injury suffered in training camp on June 23 and was replaced by the 17-year old Aiman Lahmar. Osaki was able to thrice knock Lahmar down with low kicks in the second round, which resulted in a technical knockout victory for him under the RISE rules.

Osaki faced the RISE Flyweight champion Toki Tamaru in the tournament quarterfinals on August 26, 2023. He beat Tamaru three years prior, by unanimous decision, to capture the RISE Super Flyweight title. Osaki lost the rematch by majority decision, with scores of 30–28, 29–29 and 30–29.

==== Continued title reign ====
Osaki faced Jaroensuk BoonlannaMuaythai at RISE WORLD SERIES 2023 Final Round on December 16, 2023. He won the fight by split decision, after an extra fourth round was contested.

Osaki made his first ISKA Oriental rules World Flyweight (-53.5 kg) title defense against Djillali Kharroubi at RISE ELDORADO 2024 on March 17, 2024. He won the fight by unanimous decision.

Osaki made his second RISE Super Flyweight (-53 kg) title defense against Jin Mandokoro at RISE WORLD SERIES 2024 OSAKA on June 15, 2024. He won the fight by unanimous decision, with two scorecards of 50–47 and one scorecard of 49–47 in his favor.

Osaki vacated the RISE Super Flyweight (-53 kg) title on October 21, 2024, in order to aim for the world version of the title.

==== World super flyweight champion ====
Osaki faced Albert Campos at RISE WORLD SERIES 2024 Final on December 21, 2024. He won the fight by unanimous decision. Osaki called for a RISE World Super Flyweight title to be created during a post-fight press conference, stating "Please create a world 53 kilogram title and allow to challenge for it", to which the RISE CEO Takashi Ito responded by saying "I'd like him to have one more fight in between".

Osaki faced Alester Tagure at RISE ELDORADO 2025 on March 29, 2025. RISE CEO Takashi Ito revealed during the press conference at which the bout was announced that Osaki would take part in a RISE Super Flyweight World title bout should he win the upcoming contest by stoppage. Osaki needed just 48 seconds to stop his opponent.

Osaki faced the WBC Muay Thai World Bantamweight and Super Bantamweight champion Corey Nicholson for the inaugural RISE Super Flyweight (-53 kg) World title at RISE Fire Ball on May 11, 2025. He won the fight by a fifth-round technical knockout. Osaki was up 40—35 on all three of the judges' scorecards at the time of the stoppage.

Osaki faced Lanyakaew Tor.Silapon in an open-finger glove bout at RISE WORLD SERIES 2025 Tokyo on August 2, 2025. He won the fight by a third-round technical knockout.

== Championships and accomplishments ==
=== Muay Thai ===
- World Muaythai Council
  - 2017 WMC Japan Flyweight Champion
- Lumpinee Stadium of Japan
  - 2018 LPNJ Flyweight Champion
- KNOCK OUT
  - 2018 King of Knock Out Super Flyweight Tournament Runner-up

=== Kickboxing ===
- RISE
  - 2020 RISE Super Flyweight (-53 kg) Champion
    - Two successful title defenses
  - 2025 RISE Super Flyweight (-53 kg) World Champion
  - 2023 RISE "Knockout of the Year" (vs. Nicolas Rivas)
- International Sport Kickboxing Association
  - 2023 ISKA Oriental Rules World Flyweight (-53.5 kg) Champion
    - One successful title defense

== Fight record ==
Kickboxing record
49 Wins (25 (T)KO's), 8 Losses, 2 Draws, 1 No Contest
Date	Result	Opponent	Event	Location	Method	Round	Time
2026-09-19	Loss	(Japan) Ryujin Nasukawa	RISE World Series 2026 Tokyo 2	Tokyo, Japan	Ext.R Decision (split)	6	3:00
Loses the RISE World Super Flyweight (-53 kg) title.
2026-06-06	Win	(Japan) Ryujin Nasukawa	RISE World Series 2026 Tokyo	Tokyo, Japan	Ext.R Decision (Unanimous)	4	3:00
2025-12-27	Loss	(Thailand) Jaroensuk BoonlannaMuaythai	Rajadamnern World Series, Rajadamnern Stadium 80th Anniversary	Bangkok, Thailand	Decision (Unanimous)	5	3:00
For the Rajadamnern Stadium Bantamweight (118 lbs) title.
2025-08-02	Win	(Thailand) Lanyakaew Tor.Silapon	RISE WORLD SERIES 2025 Tokyo	Tokyo, Japan	TKO (Body punches)	3	2:48
2025-05-11	Win	(Australia) Corey Nicholson	RISE Fire Ball	Nagoya, Japan	TKO (Referee stoppage)	5	1:24
Wins the inaugural RISE World Super Flyweight (-53 kg) title.
2025-03-29	Win	(Philippines) Alester Tagure	RISE ELDORADO 2025	Tokyo, Japan	KO (Punches)	1	0:48
2024-12-21	Win	(Spain) Albert Campos	RISE WORLD SERIES 2024 Final	Chiba, Japan	Decision (Unanimous)	3	3:00
2024-06-15	Win	(Japan) Jin Mandokoro	RISE WORLD SERIES 2024 Osaka	Osaka, Japan	Decision (Unanimous)	5	3:00
Defends the RISE Super Flyweight (-53 kg) title.
2024-03-17	Win	(France) Djillali Kharroubi	RISE ELDORADO 2024	Tokyo, Japan	Decision (Unanimous)	5	3:00
Defends the ISKA Oriental rules World Flyweight (-53.5 kg) title.
2023-12-16	Win	(Thailand) Jaroensuk BoonlannaMuaythai	RISE World Series 2023 - Final Round	Tokyo, Japan	Ext.R Decision (Split)	4	3:00
2023-08-26	Loss	(Japan) Toki Tamaru	RISE World Series 2023 - 2nd Round - Semi Finals	Tokyo, Japan	Decision (Majority)	3	3:00
2023-07-02	Win	(France) Aiman Lahmar	RISE World Series 2023 - 1st Round - Quarter Finals	Osaka, Japan	TKO (3 knockdowns)	2	1:41
2023-04-21	Win	(France) Nicolas Rivas	RISE 167	Tokyo, Japan	KO (Spinning heel kick)	4	0:28
Wins the vacant ISKA Oriental rules World Flyweight (-53.5 kg) title.
2023-03-26	Win	(Spain) Javier Cecilio	RISE ELDORADO 2023	Tokyo, Japan	KO (Right cross)	1	2:49
2023-01-28	Win	(Thailand) Mangkon Boomdeksian	RISE 164	Tokyo, Japan	TKO (Three knockdowns)	2	2:20
2022-10-15	Win	(Japan) Kazane	RISE WORLD SERIES 2022	Tokyo, Japan	Decision (Majority)	5	3:00
Defends the RISE Super Flyweight (-53 kg) Title.
2022-08-21	Win	(Thailand) Sanchai TeppenGym	RISE WORLD SERIES OSAKA 2022	Osaka, Japan	KO (Left hook)	3	1:45
2022-03-27	Win	(Japan) Kanta Tabuchi	RISE 156	Tokyo, Japan	Decision (Majority)	3	3:00
2021-07-18	Win	(Japan) Issei Ishii	RISE WORLD SERIES 2021 Osaka - Dead or Alive Tournament, Quarter Final	Osaka, Japan	Decision (Unanimous)	3	3:00
2021-02-23	Win	(Japan) Ikko	RISE 146	Tokyo, Japan	Decision (Majority)	3	3:00
2020-11-14	Win	(Japan) Kyo Kawakami	RISE 143	Tokyo, Japan	Decision (Unanimous)	3	3:00
2020-09-04	Win	(Japan) Toki Tamaru	RISE 142	Tokyo, Japan	Decision (Unanimous)	5	3:00
Wins the RISE Super Flyweight (-53 kg) Title.
2020-07-19	Win	(Japan) Jin Mandokoro	RISE 140	Tokyo, Japan	Ext.R Decision (Majority)	4	3:00
2020-02-23	Win	(Japan) Kazane	RISE 137	Tokyo, Japan	Decision (Unanimous)	3	3:00
2020-01-19	Win	(Thailand) Konesarn Acegym	Norainu Matsuri 6 Shin Kiba 1st Ring	Tokyo, Japan	KO (Low Kick)	1	2:53
2019-12-15	Win	(Korea) Choi Seok Hee	HOOST CUP KINGS NAGOYA 7	Nagoya, Japan	TKO (Ref. Stoppage/Punches)	2	2:57
2019-10-27	Win	(Japan) Koudai	HOOST CUP KINGS OSAKA 4	Osaka, Japan	Decision (Majority)	3	3:00
2019-08-18	Win	(Japan) Shota Takiya	Rizin 18 - Nagoya	Nagoya, Japan	Decision (Unanimous)	3	3:00
2019-06-22	Win	(Thailand)	Lumpinee Stadium	Bangkok, Thailand	KO		
2019-05-26	Win	(Japan) KING Takeshi	HOOST CUP KINGS NAGOYA 6	Nagoya, Japan	Ext.R Decision (Unanimous)	4	3:00
2019-02-11	Loss	(Thailand) Chokdee PK.Saenchaimuaythaigym	KNOCK OUT 2019 WINTER	Tokyo, Japan	Decision (Unanimous)	5	3:00
2018-12-09	Loss	(Japan) Issei Ishii	KING OF KNOCK OUT 2018, Tournament Final	Tokyo, Japan	Decision (Majority)	5	3:00
For the inaugural KNOCK OUT Flyweight Title.
2018-10-07	Win	(Japan) Yoshiho Tane	KNOCK OUT 2018 CROSS OVER, Tournament Semifinal	Tokyo, Japan	TKO (Ref. Stoppage)	5	1:35
2018-08-19	Win	(Japan) Tatsuya Noto	KNOCK OUT SUMMER FES.2018, Tournament Quarterfinal	Tokyo, Japan	TKO (Punches)	2	1:12
2018-06-15	Loss	(Thailand) Kiew Parunchai	Lumpinee Stadium	Bangkok, Thailand	Decision	5	3:00
For the Lumpinee Stadium 112 lbs Title.
2018-04-30	Win	(Japan) Tatsuya Hibata	Muay thai Open 41	Tokyo, Japan	KO (Knee)	2	2:45
Wins the Lumpinee Stadium of Japan Flyweight Title.
2018-04-08	Win	(Japan) Taiga Nakayama	The Battle Of Muaythai 17	Tokyo, Japan	Decision (Majority)	5	3:00
Defends the WMC Japan Flyweight Title.
2018-02-24	Win	(Thailand) Samsayam Siriliakmuaythai	Lumpinee Stadium	Bangkok, Thailand	KO (Knees)	1	
2018-01-27	Win	(Thailand) Attachai Sitkunthap	Lumpinee Stadium	Bangkok, Thailand	TKO (Ref. Stoppage/Punches)	2	
2017-12-02	Win	(Thailand) Suarek Lianplaza	Lumpinee Stadium	Bangkok, Thailand	KO (Left Hook)	1	
2017-11-04	Win	(Thailand) Changpueknoi Warriormuaythaipattaya	Lumpinee Stadium	Bangkok, Thailand	KO (Left hook to the body)	1	
2017-08-06	Win	(Thailand) Gukkorn Lianresort	Suk Wanchai MuayThai Super Fight	Nagoya, Japan	KO (Left Body Hook)	2	2:55
2017-04-12	Win	(Thailand) Jamtalay	Rajadamnern Stadium	Bangkok, Thailand	KO	2	
2017-03-05	Win	(Japan) Yuya Kosaka	Muay Lok 2017 1st, Final	Tokyo, Japan	Decision (Unanimous)	5	3:00
Wins the WMC Japan Flyweight Title.
2017-03-05	Win	(Japan) Yuri	Muay Lok 2017 1st, Semi Final	Tokyo, Japan	KO	1	2:34
2017-02-06	Win	(Thailand) Kongchaiden ThorPhran49	Rajadamnern Stadium	Bangkok, Thailand	KO	1	
2016-11-20	Win	(Japan) Bunta Tanouchi	HOOST CUP KINGS NAGOYA II ～REVOLUTION	Nagoya, Japan	Decision (Unanimous)	3	3:00
2016-06-19	Win	(Thailand) Towakiew Kiatkampon	Wanchai+Kingthong Rajadamnern Stadium	Bangkok, Thailand	KO (Left Body Hook)	2	2:57
2016-02-13	Win	(Thailand) Chadpayak Toyturakijbanteng	Lumpinee Stadium	Bangkok, Thailand	TKO	2	
2015-12-27	NC	(Japan) Daiki	Hoost Cup Kings Nagoya	Nagoya, Japan	Doctor stoppage (head clash)	1	2:28
2015-05-10	Draw	(Japan) Issei Ishii	Wanchai + PK MuayThai Super Fight	Nagoya, Japan	Decision	3	3:00
2015-02-10	Win	(Thailand) Phetsmuslim Kitchikes		Nakhon Pathom, Thailand	TKO	1	
2014-12-27	Draw	(Japan) Issei Ishii	Hoost Cup FOREVER～Kick yo、Eien ni ！～	Nagoya, Japan	Decision	3	3:00
2014-08-17	Loss	(Japan) Hunter Vanhoose	MUAYTHAI WINDY SUPER FIGHT vol.17	Tokyo, Japan	Decision (Unanimous)	3	3:00
2014-03-23	Win	(Japan) Kaito Gibu	HOOST CUP LEGEND	Nagoya, Japan	Decision (Unanimous)	3	3:00
2014-01-12	Win	(Japan) Yuzuki Sakai	MUAYTHAI WINDY SUPER FIGHT ～Muaythaiphoon～	Nagoya, Japan	Decision (Unanimous)	3	3:00
Legend: Win Loss Draw/No contest Notes

=== Amateur record ===
Amateur Kickboxing & Muay Thai record
Date	Result	Opponent	Event	Location	Method	Round	Time
2013-09-23	Win	(Japan) Genki Takeno	Amateur Shootboxing	Japan			
2013-08-11	Win	(Japan) Shogo Hosoda	MUAY THAI WINDY SUPER FIGHT vol.14	Tokyo, Japan	KO	2	
2011-10-23	Loss	(Japan) Ueda	Nagoya Kick	Nagoya, Japan	Decision (Majority)	2	2:00
2011-10-16	Win	(Japan) Tsuchiya	BRIDGE one match challenge 18th	Aichi Prefecture, Japan	Decision		
2011-10-16	Win	(Japan)	BRIDGE one match challenge 18th	Aichi Prefecture, Japan	Decision		
2011-02-20	Loss	(Japan) Yukari Yamaguchi	Striking Challenge Shootboxing	Nagoya, Japan	Decision	2	2:00
2011-02-20	Draw	(Japan) Kentaro Miyachi	Striking Challenge Shootboxing	Nagoya, Japan	Decision	2	2:00
2010-11-07	Win	(Japan) Hiroaki Osanai	BRIDGE one match challenge 15th	Aichi Prefecture, Japan	Decision	2	2:00
2010-02-21	Draw	(Japan) Jun Sugishita	BRIDGE one match challenge 13th	Aichi Prefecture, Japan	Decision	2	2:00
2010-01-24	Loss	(Japan) Toraji Ootahara	KAMINARIMON	Aichi Prefecture, Japan	Decision (Unanimous)	3	2:00
For the KAMINARIMON -35kg Title.
2009-10-25	Win	(Japan) Shohei Miura	KAMINARIMON, Final	Tokyo, Japan	Decision (Unanimous)	1	2:00
2009-10-25	Win	(Japan) Yuta Shinozaki	KAMINARIMON, Semi Final	Tokyo, Japan	Decision (Unanimous)	1	2:00
2009-10-18	Win	(Japan) Ayumu Saito	BRIDGE one match challenge 12th	Tokyo, Japan	Decision (Unanimous)	2	2:00
Legend: Win Loss Draw/No contest Notes

== See also ==
- List of male kickboxers
