= Koudai Hirayama =

Japanese kickboxer

Koudai
- Born: Koudai Hirayama; March 15, 1998 (age 28); Amagasaki, Hyōgo Prefecture, Japan
- Native name: 平山 滉大
- Nickname: Master of the Sixth Sense
- Nationality: Japanese
- Height: 1.64 m (5 ft 4 1/2 in)
- Weight: 53 kg (117 lb; 8.3 st)
- Style: Kickboxing, karate
- Stance: Orthodox
- Fighting out of: Osaka, Japan
- Team: Oikawa Dojo
- Years active: 2015 - 2023

Kickboxing record
- Total: 25
- Wins: 16
- By knockout: 4
- Losses: 7
- By knockout: 0
- Draws: 2

Koudai Hirayama (Japanese: 平山 滉大, Hirayama Koudai; born March 15, 1998), better known by his ring name Koudai, is a Japanese retired kickboxer.

As of October 2022, he was ranked as the fourth best strawweight (-54 kg) kickboxer in the world by Combat Press and the sixth best flyweight (-53 kg) kickboxer in the world by Beyond Kick.

== Kickboxing career ==
=== Early career ===
After winning his debut fight against Ogre Maruhata, Koudai would win his next six fights as well. He defeated Kyo Kawakami at Shoot Boxing 2017 act.1 on February 11, 2017. Some of the most notable victories during this run included Masashi Kumura and Jin Mandokoro.

His seven fight winning streak earned Koudai a chance to challenge Yoshiho Tane for the DEEP KICK -53 kg championship at DEEP☆KICK 34 on December 17, 2017. Koudai won the fight by unanimous decision, with scores of 30–28, 29–28 and 30–29.

Koudai faced Yuuya Hayashi at NJKF WEST Young Fight 4th on August 19, 2018. The fight ended in a majority decision draw, a career-first for Koudai.

Koudai faced Ponchan OZgym at Suk Wanchai MuayThai Super Fight vol.5 on September 24, 2019. He got back to his winning ways, as he won the fight by a first-round knockout. Koudai was next booked to face Yuuichi at HOOST CUP KINGS OSAKA 3 on October 28, 2018. He won the fight by a second-round technical knockout.

Hiroyama faced Masayoshi Kunimoto at HOOST CUP KINGS Nagoya 5 on December 23, 2018. The fight was ruled a unanimous decision draw, with two scorecards of 29–29 and one scorecard of 30–30. The two fought an immediate rematch at HOOST CUP KINGS Kyoto 5 on March 3, 2019. Hiroyama won the fight by a majority decision, with scores of 30–29, 29–29 and 29–28.

Koudai faced Koki Osaki for the vacant HOOST CUP -53 kg title at HOOST CUP KINGS NAGOYA 6 on May 26, 2019. Hiroyama defeated Osaki by an extra round majority decision, with scores of 10–9, 10–9 and 10–10. Koudai made his first DEEP KICK -53 kg title defense in a rematch with Jin Mandokoro at DEEP KICK 40 on September 15, 2019. Koudai won the rematch by unanimous decision, with scores of 29–28, 30–29 and 30–28.

Hiroyama faced Kazuki Osaki in a non-title bout at HOOST CUP KINGS OSAKA 4 on October 27, 2019. Hiroyama lost the fight by majority decision, with scores of 30–29, 29–29 and 30–29. Koudai made his first HOOST CUP -53 kg title defense against King Takeshi at HOOST CUP KINGS OSAKA 5 on October 18, 2020. He won the fight by unanimous decision.

=== RISE ===
Koudai was booked to face Shiro in the quarterfinals of the 2021 RISE Dead or Alive -53 kg Tournament, which was held at RISE WORLD SERIES 2021 Osaka on July 18, 2021. The bout was ruled a split decision draw after the first three rounds, which led to an extension round being contested. Shiro was awarded a unanimous decision after the extra round, with all three judges scoring the fight 10–8 in his favor, as Koudai was knocked down with a one-two midway through the round.

Hirayama was expected to face Koki Osaki in a tournament reserve match at RISE WORLD SERIES 2021 Yokohama on September 23, 2021. Osaki was later rescheduled to face Shiro in the tournament semifinals, as a replacement for his brother Kazuki Osaki, who withdrew with an ankle injury. As Osaki later missed weight, he was in turn replaced by Hirayama. Kodai lost the fight by unanimous decision.

Koudai faced Azusa Kaneko at HOOST CUP KINGS KYOTO 9 〜REVERSAL〜 on March 27, 2022. He won the fight by unanimous decision. After successfully snapping his two-fight losing skid, Koudai was scheduled to face Ryu Hanaoka at RISE 159 on June 24, 2022. He lost the fight by unanimous decision, with all three judges scoring the fight 30–29 for him.

Koudai faced Auto Muangphapoon in a -55 kg bout at HOOST CUP KINGS KYOTO 10 on October 16, 2022. He lost the fight by majority decision.

Koudai faced the one-time RISE super flyweight title challenger Jin Mandokoro at RISE 163 on December 10, 2022. He lost the fight by unanimous decision, with all three judges scoring the bout 30–29 in his favor.

Koudai made his second HOOST CUP -53 kg title defense against Ryuki Matsuda at HOOST CUP KINGS KYOTO 11 on March 5, 2023. He lost the fight by unanimous decision, with two scorecards of 50–46 and one scorecard of 50–47. Koudai was knocked down with a left hook in the fourth round.

== Championships and accomplishments ==
=== Amateur ===
- Shoot Boxing
  - 2014 Shootboxing Kansai -55 kg Champion
- Shin Karate
  - 2015 Shin Karate All Japan K-2 Grand Prix Lightweight Champion
  - 2015 Dageki Kakutougi Japan Cup -55 kg runner-up

=== Professional ===
- HOOST CUP
  - 2019 HOOST CUP -53 kg Championship
    - One successful title defense
- DEEP KICK
  - 2017 DEEP KICK -53 kg Championship
    - One successful title defense

== Fight record ==
Kickboxing record
16 wins (4 (T)KOs), 7 losses, 2 draws
Date	Result	Opponent	Event	Location	Method	Round	Time
2023-03-05	Loss	(Japan) Ryuki Matsuda	HOOST CUP KINGS KYOTO 11	Kyoto, Japan	Decision (unanimous)	5	3:00
Loses the HOOST CUP -53kg title.
2022-12-10	Loss	(Japan) Jin Mandokoro	RISE 163	Tokyo, Japan	Decision (unanimous)	3	3:00
2022-10-16	Loss	(Thailand) Autor Muangphapoon	HOOST CUP KINGS KYOTO 10	Kyoto, Japan	Decision (majority)	3	3:00
2022-06-24	Loss	(Japan) Ryu Hanaoka	RISE 159	Tokyo, Japan	Decision (unanimous)	3	3:00
2022-03-27	Win	(Japan) Azusa Kaneko	HOOST CUP KINGS KYOTO 9 〜REVERSAL〜	Kyoto, Japan	Decision (unanimous)	3	3:00
2021-09-23	Loss	(Japan) Shiro	RISE WORLD SERIES 2021 Yokohama - Dead or Alive Tournament, Semi Finals	Yokohama, Japan	Decision (unanimous)	3	3:00
2021-07-18	Loss	(Japan) Shiro	RISE WORLD SERIES 2021 Osaka - Dead or Alive Tournament, Quarter Final	Osaka, Japan	Ext.R decision (unanimous)	4	3:00
2021-03-07	Win	(Thailand) Jomrawee RefinasGym	HOOST CUP KINGS KYOTO 7	Kyoto, Japan	Decision (unanimous)	3	3:00
2020-10-18	Win	(Japan) King Takeshi	HOOST CUP KINGS OSAKA 5	Osaka, Japan	Decision (unanimous)	3	3:00
Defends the HOOST CUP -53kg title.
2019-10-27	Loss	(Japan) Kazuki Osaki	HOOST CUP KINGS OSAKA 4	Osaka, Japan	Decision (majority)	3	3:00
2019-09-15	Win	(Japan) Jin Mandokoro	DEEP☆KICK 40	Osaka, Japan	Decision (unanimous)	3	3:00
Defends the DEEP KICK -53kg title.
2019-05-26	Win	(Japan) Koki Osaki	HOOST CUP KINGS NAGOYA 6	Nagoya, Japan	Ext.R decision (majority)	4	3:00
Wins the vacant HOOST CUP -53kg title.
2019-03-03	Win	(Japan) Masayoshi Kunimoto	HOOST CUP KINGS KYOTO 5	Kyoto, Japan	Decision (majority)	3	3:00
2018-12-23	Draw	(Japan) Masayoshi Kunimoto	HOOST CUP KINGS NAGOYA 5	Nagoya, Japan	Decision (unanimous)	3	3:00
2018-10-28	Win	(Japan) Yuuichi	HOOST CUP KINGS OSAKA 3	Osaka, Japan	TKO (doctor stoppage)	2	1:57
2018-09-24	Win	(Thailand) Ponchan OZgym	Suk Wanchai MuayThai Super Fight vol.5	Aichi Prefecture, Japan	KO (high kick)	1	
2018-08-19	Draw	(Japan) Yuuya Hayashi	NJKF WEST Young Fight 4th	Osaka, Japan	Decision (majority)	3	3:00
2017-12-17	Win	(Japan) Yoshiho Tane	DEEP☆KICK 34	Osaka, Japan	Decision (unanimous)	3	3:00
Wins the DEEP KICK -53kg title.
2017-07-16	Win	(Japan) Jin Mandokoro	DEEP☆KICK 33	Osaka, Japan	Decision (split)	3	3:00
2017-04-09	Win	(Japan) Masashi Kumura	DEEP☆KICK 32	Osaka, Japan	KO (left high kick)	2	2:26
2017-02-11	Win	(Japan) Kyo Kawakami	SHOOT BOXING 2017 act.1	Tokyo, Japan	KO (straight right)	2	2:02
2016-10-02	Win	(Japan) Kazane	HOOST CUP KINGS OSAKA	Osaka, Japan	Decision (unanimous)	3	3:00
2016-06-05	Win	(Japan) Hiroaki Ookuwa	SHOOT BOXING 2016 act.3	Tokyo, Japan	Decision (unanimous)	3	3:00
2016-05-22	Win	(Japan) Ken Taniguchi	HIGHSPEED EX	Osaka, Japan	Decision	3	3:00
2015-10-03	Win	(Japan) Ogre Maruhata	SHOOT BOXING THE LAST BOMB	Osaka, Japan	Decision (unanimous)	3	3:00
Legend: Win Loss Draw/no contest Notes

=== Amateur record ===
Amateur kickboxing record
Date	Result	Opponent	Event	Location	Method	Round	Time
2015-10-24	Loss	(Japan) Hiroto Ishitsuka	Amateur Dageki Kakutougi Japan Cup 2015, Final	Tokyo, Japan	Decision		
For the 2015 Japan Cup -55kg title.
2015-10-24	Win	(Japan) Shun Sato	Amateur Dageki Kakutougi Japan Cup 2015, Semi Final	Tokyo, Japan			
2015-10-24	Win	(Japan) Jun Nojo	Amateur Dageki Kakutougi Japan Cup 2015, Quarter Final	Tokyo, Japan			
2015-01-18	Win	(Japan) Kyouji Watano	SHOOT BOXING Amateur	Osaka, Japan	Decision (unanimous)	2	2:00
2014-10-05	Loss	(Japan) Genki Takeno	SHOOT BOXING Amateur	Nagoya, Japan	Ex.R decision	3	2:00
2014-06-29	Win	(Japan) Hiroki Kasahara	SHOOT BOXING Amateur	Osaka, Japan	Decision	2	2:00
2014-03-23	Win	(Japan) Kaiichi Kitayama	HOOST CUP LEGEND	Nagoya, Japan	Decision	2	2:00
2014-02-16	Win	(Japan) Yusuke Aoyama	SHOOT BOXING Amateur	Osaka, Japan	Decision	2	2:00
2013-10-20	Draw	(Japan) Nobuhide Toyooka	NEXT LEVEL Kansai 10	Osaka, Japan	Decision	2	2:00
Legend: Win Loss Draw/no contest Notes

== See also ==
- List of male kickboxers
