= RISE (kickboxing) =

Kickboxing promotion

RISE Creation Co Ltd
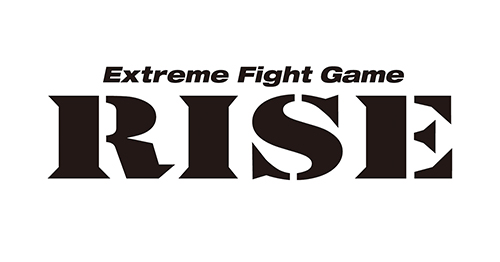
- Type: Private
- Industry: Martial arts promotion
- Founded: 2003
- Founder: Takashi Ito
- Headquarters: Toshima, Tokyo, Japan
- Key people: Takashi Ito, CEO
- Website: https://rise-rc.com/

Extreme Fight Game RISE, known simply as RISE, is a Japanese kickboxing promotion company based in Tokyo. Their name is an abbreviation of "Real Impact Sports Entertainment".

Its main roster showcases ten male and three female weight classes. They also hold the KAMINARIMON events, which are exclusively open to amateur fighters.

== History ==
RISE held their inaugural event on February 23, 2003, at the Gold Jim South Tokyo Annex in Ōmori, Japan. They held their first "Dead or Alive" tournament on December 23, 2003, which would later become an annual event held at the end of each year. Before the bankruptcy of Fighting and Entertainment Group, winners of the "Dead or Alive" tournaments earned a berth in the K-1 MAX Japan tournaments. After successfully holding "Dead or Alive" tournaments at 70 kg for two consecutive years, by the end of 2005 they furthermore held tournaments at 60 kg, 80 kg and heavyweight as well.

It 2008, RISE opted to stop deciding on champions through one-day tournaments, as they believed the result of the matches may be affected by a combination of favorable match-ups and luck. They instead began deciding on champions through single five-round bouts. The first three championships were at 60 kg, 70 kg and at heavyweight. Rankings weren't established at the time.

Beginning with R.I.S.E. 46 ~ THE KING OF GLADIATORS '08 ~, RISE began to use Arabic numerals in event names. Up to that point, event names used Roman numerals.

The first women's championship was established on November 23, 2011, when Rena Kubota was crowned the RISE Queen after defeating Erika Kamimura.

On January 5, 2022, RISE announced a partnership with Glory, which would allow cross-promotion and mutual exchange of fighters under contract. On February 10, 2023, they reached the same agreement with K-1. On January 11, 2024, it was announced that Glory and RISE would hold joint tournaments, combine their rankings and unify their rankings.

== Rules ==
The original RISE rules allowed strikes with fists and elbows, but prohibited knee strikes. Passivity from fighters was penalized by half point deductions. From May 16, 2010, RISE adopted K-1 rules which allowed for a single knee strike, but prohibited elbow strikes. The bouts are contested across three rounds lasting three minutes. Two additional extra rounds can be fought. The fighters wear shorts or tight kick pants, while women must additionally wear a top. All fighters must have a mouth guard. Elbow strikes, excessive petroleum jelly usage, eye pokes, throws, and unsporting behavior may all result in a point deduction.

If a fighter fails to make weight, they will be afforded a second opportunity two hours after the initial weigh-in. Should they pass, they will be fined a percentage of their purse and will be given a point deduction. If they're above weight by 2 kilograms or more, they will be disqualified and the bout will be declared a no-contest. If they fail the second weigh-in but aren't above 2 kilograms, they will be given a two-point deduction, will be fined a portion of their purse, and may be forced to fight in 10 oz gloves, if their opponent so chooses. The fighter must still be within 5% of the contracted weight, three hours before the event is supposed to take place.

The fights in amateur events called RISE NOVA (formerly KAMINARIMON) are contested across three rounds of two minutes. Alongside all the prohibitions present in RISE fights, knee strikes to the head are likewise prohibited. Single matches don't have an extension rounds in case of a draw, while tournament draws result in a single one minute extra round.

== Broadcast ==
RISE events are broadcast by AbemaTV domestically in Japan, with full matches from these events later posted on their YouTube channel. RISE World Series events were previously streamed outside of Japan on FITE TV (now TrillerTV).

== Champions ==
=== World Champions ===
Division	Champion	Date Won	Title Defenses
Super Lightweight (65 kg)	Vacant		
Featherweight (57.5 kg)	Vacant		
Bantamweight (55 kg)	(Japan) Koki Osaki	March 28, 2026	0
Super Flyweight (53 kg)	(Japan) Ryujin Nasukawa	September 19, 2026	0

=== Japan Champions ===
Division	Champion	Date Won	Title Defenses
Heavyweight (120 kg)	Vacant		
Light Heavyweight (90 kg)	(Japan) Kenta Nanbara	August 18, 2023	1
Middleweight (70 kg)	(Japan) Motoyasu	June 28, 2026	0
Welterweight (67.5 kg)	(Canada) Meison Hide Usami	December 21, 2024	0
Super Lightweight (65 kg)	(Japan) Yura	September 19, 2026	0
Lightweight (62.5 kg)	(Japan) Ryuto Shiokawa	April 26, 2026	0
Super Featherweight (60 kg)	(Japan) Hyuma Hitachi	January 18, 2026	0
Featherweight (57.5 kg)	(Japan) Akito Nakashima	October 17, 2026	0
Bantamweight (55 kg)	(Japan) Koki Osaki	December 10, 2023	1
Super Flyweight (53 kg)	(Japan) Jin Mandokoro	November 8, 2026	0
Flyweight (51 kg)	(Japan) Tenshi Matsumoto	February 23, 2026	1
W. Bantamweight (55 kg)	Vacant		
W. Flyweight (52 kg)	(Netherlands) Tessa de Kom	May 28, 2023	3
W. Mini Flyweight (49 kg)	(Japan) Mei Miyamoto	May 11, 2025	0
W. Atomweight (46 kg)	(Japan) Haruka Shimada	December 14, 2025	0

== Championship history ==
=== Heavyweight championship ===
Weight limit: 120 kg

No.	Name	Event	Date	Defenses
1	(Brazil) Fabiano Aoki def. Magnum Sakai	RISE 48; Tokyo, Japan	July 4, 2008	
2	(Japan) Makoto Uehara def. Raoumaru	RISE 80; Tokyo, Japan	July 23, 2011	
Uehara vacated the title on September 12, 2012, in order to participate in the 2013 K-1 WGP
3	(Japan) Kengo Shimizu def. Raoumaru	RISE 90; Tokyo, Japan	October 25, 2012	1. def. Hiromi Amada RISE 99 on April 29, 2014 in Tokyo, Japan; 2. def. Badr Ferdaous RISE 127 on September 16, 2018 in Tokyo, Japan
Shimizu retired from the sport on November 17, 2018

=== Light Heavyweight championship ===
Weight limit: 90 kg

No.	Name	Event	Date	Defenses
1	(Japan) Makoto Uehara def. Kengo Shimizu	RISE 92; Tokyo, Japan	March 17, 2013	
Uehara vacated the title in 2016 in order to re-sign with K-1.
2	(Japan) Kenta Nanbara def. Kongtualai JMBoxingGym	RISE 171; Tokyo, Japan	August 18, 2023	1. def. Gunther Kalunda at RISE 2021 on August 29, 2026 in Tokyo, Japan

=== Middleweight championship ===
Weight limit: 70 kg

No.	Name	Event	Date	Defenses
1	(Japan) Hinata def. Ryuji	RISE 48; Tokyo, Japan	July 4, 2008	
Hinata vacated the title in July 2009
2	(Japan) Ryuji def. Yasuhito Shirasu	RISE 60; Tokyo, Japan	November 22, 2009	
3	(Japan) Takafumi Morita def. Yukihiro Komiya	RISE 80; Tokyo, Japan	July 23, 2011	
4	(South Korea) Lee Sung-hyun def. Shintaro Matsukura	RISE 133; Tokyo, Japan	July 5, 2019	
5	(Japan) Kaito Ono def. Lee Sung-hyun	RISE ELDORADO 2023; Tokyo, Japan	March 26, 2023	
Kaito vacated the title on March 8, 2026.
6	(Japan) Motoyasu def. Yuya	RISE 199; Tokyo, Japan	June 28, 2026	

=== Welterweight championship ===
Weight limit: 67.5 kg

No.	Name	Event	Date	Defenses
1	(Brazil) Danilo Zanolini def. Taiki Watanabe	RISE 96; Tokyo, Japan	November 4, 2013	1. def. Yuichiro Nagashima RISE 100～BLADE 0～ on July 12, 2014 in Tokyo, Japan; 2. def. Kenta Yamada at RISE 106 on July 24, 2015 in Tokyo, Japan
Zanolini retired from the sport on July 15, 2017
2	(United States) Bey Noah def. Daiki Watabe	RISE 129; Tokyo, Japan	November 17, 2018	1. def. Hideki RISE 137 on February 23, 2020 in Tokyo, Japan
BeyNoah vacated the title in February 2022, in order to move up in weight
3	(Japan) Ryota Nakano def. Ryoya Inai	RISE 158; Tokyo, Japan	May 29, 2022	
Nakano vacated the title in November 2024
4	(Canada) Meison Hide Usami def. Takumi Sanekata	GLORY RISE Featherweight Grand Prix; Chiba, Japan	December 21, 2024	

=== Super Lightweight World championship ===
Weight limit: 65 kg

No.	Name	Event	Date	Defenses
1	(Thailand) Petpanomrung Kiatmuu9 def. Kento Haraguchi	RISE WORLD SERIES OSAKA 2022; Osaka, Japan	August 21, 2022	
2	(Australia) Chadd Collins def. Petpanomrung Kiatmuu9	RISE WORLD SERIES 2023 Final Round; Tokyo, Japan	December 16, 2023	1. def. Kento Haraguchi at RISE World Series 2025 Tokyo on August 2, 2025 in Tokyo, Japan
Collins relinquished the title in September 2026 after signing with a new organization.

=== Super Lightweight championship ===
Weight limit: 65 kg

No.	Name	Event	Date	Defenses
1	(Japan) Koji Yoshimoto def. Yūsuke Sugawara	RISE 60; Tokyo, Japan	November 22, 2009	1. draw. Yūsuke Sugawara at Rise 74 on February 27, 2011 in Tokyo, Japan; 2. def. Yasuomi Soda at Rise 86 on January 28, 2012 in Tokyo, Japan
2	(Japan) Yasuomi Soda def. Koji Yoshimoto	RISE 60; Tokyo, Japan	March 17, 2013	
Soda vacated the title on August 27, 2014, to sign with K-1
3	(Japan) Yuki def. Naoki	RISE 101; Tokyo, Japan	September 28, 2014	
Yuki vacated the title on May 3, 2017 in order to return to super featherweight
4	(Japan) Kosei Yamada def. Yuma Yamaguchi	RISE 134; Tokyo, Japan	September 29, 2019	1. def. Takumi Sanekata at RISE 145 on January 31, 2021 in Tokyo, Japan; 2. def. Katsuki Kitano at RISE 150 on June 18, 2021 in Tokyo, Japan
Title was left vacant on December 25, 2022, as Yamada retired from the sport
5	(Japan) Taiju Shiratori def. Yutaro Asahi	RISE Eldorado 2025; Tokyo, Japan	March 29, 2025	
6	(Japan) Yura def. Taiju Shiratori	RISE World Series 2026 Tokyo 2 Tokyo, Japan	September 19, 2026	

=== Lightweight championship ===
Weight limit: 62.5 kg
63 kg (2010 - 2025)

No.	Name	Event	Date	Defenses
1	(Japan) Yuki def. Koji Yoshimoto	RISE 73; Tokyo, Japan	December 19, 2010	
2	(South Korea) Lee Sung-hyun def. Yuki	RISE 91; Tokyo, Japan	January 6, 2013	
3	(Japan) Hiroshi Mizumachi def. Shohei Asahara	RISE 106; Tokyo, Japan	November 8, 2015	1. def. Keisuke Niwa at Rise 108 on November 8, 2015 in Tokyo, Japan
4	(Japan) Fukashi Mizutani def. Hiroshi Mizumachi	RISE 112; Tokyo, Japan	July 30, 2016	1. def. Shohei Asahara at Rise 119 on September 15, 2017 in Tokyo, Japan
Fukashi vacated the title on December 11, 2018 in order to move up to super lightweight
5	(Japan) Taiju Shiratori def. Hideki	RISE 112; Tokyo, Japan	February 3, 2019	
Shiratori vacated the title on August 1, 2020.
6	(Japan) Kento Haraguchi def. Hideki	RISE 136; Tokyo, Japan	January 13, 2020	
Haraguchi vacated the title on December 15, 2020
7	(Japan) Naoki Tanaka def. Hideki	RISE 145; Tokyo, Japan	January 30, 2021	
8	(Japan) Kan Nakamura def. Naoki Tanaka	RISE 167; Tokyo, Japan	April 21, 2023	
Nakamura vacated the title on January 18, 2026
8	(Japan) Ryuto Shiokawa def. Masahito Okuyama	RISE 197; Tokyo, Japan	April 26, 2026	

=== Super Featherweight championship ===
Weight limit: 60 kg

No.	Name	Event	Date	Defenses
1	(Japan) Yuki def. Yuji Takeuchi	RISE 48; Tokyo, Japan	July 4, 2008	
2	(Japan) Kan Itabashi def. Yuki	RISE 52; Tokyo, Japan	January 31, 2009	1. def. TURBΦ at RISE 57 on July 26, 2009 in Tokyo, Japan; 2. def. Keiji Ozaki at RISE 60 on June 5, 2015 in Bunkyo, Tokyo, Japan
3	(Japan) Kosuke Komiyama def. Kan Itabashi	RISE 74; Tokyo, Japan	February 27, 2011	1. def. Motochika Hanada at RISE 88 on June 2, 2012 in Tokyo, Japan; 2. def. Masanobu Goshu at RISE 97 on January 25, 2014 in Tokyo, Japan
Komiyama vacated the title in 2015
4	(Japan) Kodai Nobe def. Motochika Hanada	RISE 109; Tokyo, Japan	January 31, 2016	
5	(South Korea) Chan Hyung Lee def. Koudai Nobe	RISE 121; Tokyo, Japan	November 23, 2017	1. def. Kazuma at RISE 160 on July 29, 2022 in Tokyo, Japan; 2. def. Hyuma Hitachi at RISE 164 on January 28, 2023 in Tokyo, Japan
–	(Japan) Kazuma def. Yusaku Ishizaki for interim title	RISE 152; Tokyo, Japan	October 22, 2021	
6	(Japan) Taiga def. Chan Hyung Lee	RISE 175; Tokyo, Japan	January 14, 2024	
Taiga vacated the title on January 21, 2025, in order to transition to MMA
7	(Japan) Hyuma Hitachi def. Panuwat TGT	RISE 195; Tokyo, Japan	January 18, 2026	

=== Featherweight World championship ===
Weight limit: 57.5 kg

No.	Name	Event	Date	Defenses
1	(Japan) Tenshin Nasukawa def. Rodtang Jitmuangnon	RISE 125; Chiba, Japan	June 17, 2018	

=== Featherweight championship ===
Weight limit: 57.5 kg

No.	Name	Event	Date	Defenses
1	(Japan) Itto def. Ryo Pegasus	RISE 90; Tokyo, Japan	October 24, 2012	
2	(Japan) Motochika Hanada def. Itto	RISE 101; Tokyo, Japan	September 28, 2014	1. def. Yoshihisa Morimoto at RISE 114 on November 25, 2016 in Tokyo, Japan
Motochika vacated the title on February 13, 2018
3	(Japan) Masahide Kudo def. Yoshihisa "Kyoken" Morimoto	RISE 125; Chiba, Japan	June 17, 2018	1. def. Masaki Takeuchi at RISE 151 on July 28, 2021 in Tokyo, Japan
On December 11, 2021 Kudo announced his retirement after suffering a nose injury deemed inoperable.
4	(Japan) Taisei Umei def. Ryoga Hirano	RISE 156; Tokyo, Japan	March 27, 2022	
5	(Japan) Keisuke Monguchi def. Taisei Umei	RISE 161; Tokyo, Japan	August 28, 2022	1. def. Kaito Sakaguchi at RISE 172 on October 29, 2023 in Tokyo, Japan
6	(Japan) Haruto Yasumoto def. Keisuke Monguchi	RISE 182; Tokyo, Japan	October 20, 2024	1. def. Yuta Kunieda at RISE 188 on May 31, 2025 in Tokyo, Japan
Yasumoto relinquished the title on June 5, 2026, in order to aim for the world title.
7	(Japan) Akito Nakashima def. Ryunosuke Omori	RISE 182; Tokyo, Japan	October 17, 2026	

=== Bantamweight World championship ===
Weight limit: 55 kg

No.	Name	Event	Date	Defenses
1	(Japan) Shiro def. Diesellek Wor.Wanchai	RISE ELDORADO 2023; Tokyo, Japan	March 26, 2023	1. no contest with Toki Tamaru at RISE ELDORADO 2024 on March 17, 2024 in Tokyo, Japan; 2. def. Toki Tamaru at RISE World Series 2024 Yokohama on September 8, 2024 in Yokohama, Japan; 3. def. Masashi Kumura at RISE World Series 2025 Tokyo on August 2, 2025 in Tokyo, Japan
2	(Japan) Koki Osaki def. Shiro	RISE ELDORADO 2026; Tokyo, Japan	March 28, 2026	

=== Bantamweight championship ===
Weight limit: 55 kg

No.	Name	Event	Date	Defenses
1	(Japan) Akira Morita def. KO-ICHI		May 31, 2009	
Morita retired from the sport in September 2011
2	(Japan) Nobuchika Terado def. TOMONORI	RISE 60; Tokyo, Japan	November 22, 2009	1. def. Makoto Kushima at RISE 68 on July 31, 2010 in Tokyo, Japan
Terado vacated the title in 2010
3	(Japan) Kenji Kubo def. Dyki	RISE 85; Tokyo, Japan	November 23, 2011	
Kubo vacated the title on September 18, 2012, after transitioning to boxing
4	(Japan) Dyki def. Seiya Rokugawa	RISE 92; Tokyo, Japan	March 17, 2013	
Dyki retired from the sport on August 16, 2013
5	(Japan) Yuta Murakoshi def. Hiroki Maeda	RISE 100; Tokyo, Japan	July 12, 2014	
6	(Japan) Tenshin Nasukawa def. Yuta Murakoshi	RISE 105; Tokyo, Japan	May 31, 2015	1. def. Yuta Murakoshi at Rise 113 on September 25, 2016 in Tokyo, Japan
Nasukawa vacated the title on June 6, 2018, after moving up to featherweight
7	(Japan) Masahiko Suzuki def. Yuki Masato	RISE 129; Tokyo, Japan	November 17, 2018	1. def. Rasta at RISE 136 on January 13, 2020 in Tokyo, Japan; 2. def. Kengo at RISE 154 on January 23, 2022 in Tokyo, Japan
8	(Japan) Koki Osaki def. Masahiko Suzuki	RISE 174; Tokyo, Japan	December 10, 2023	1. def. Ryunosuke Omori at RISE 181 on August 31, 2024 in Tokyo, Japan

=== Super Flyweight World championship ===
Weight limit: 53 kg

No.	Name	Event	Date	Defenses
1	(Japan) Kazuki Osaki def. Corey Nicholson	RISE Fire Ball; Nagoya, Japan	May 11, 2025	
2	(Japan) Ryujin Nasukawa def. Kazuki Osaki	RISE World Series 2026 Tokyo 2 Tokyo, Japan	September 19, 2026	

=== Super Flyweight championship ===
Weight limit: 53 kg

No.	Name	Event	Date	Defenses
1	(Japan) Toki Tamaru def. Azusa Kaneko	RISE 128; Tokyo, Japan	November 2, 2018	1. def. Jin Mandokoro at RISE 132 on May 19, 2019 in Tokyo, Japan
2	(Japan) Kazuki Osaki def. Toki Tamaru	RISE 142; Tokyo, Japan	September 4, 2020	1. def. Kazane Nagai at RISE World Series 2022 on October 15, 2022 in Tokyo, Japan; 2. def. Jin Mandokoro at RISE World Series 2024 Osaka on June 15, 2024 in Osaka, Japan
Osaki vacated the belt on October 21, 2024 in order to aim for the world version of the title.
3	(Japan) Ryu Hanaoka def. Jin Mandokoro	RISE 184; Tokyo, Japan	December 15, 2024	
Hanaoka vacated the titlle on January 17, 2026 in order to move up in weight
4	(Japan) Ryujin Nasukawa def. Kaito Hasegawa	RISE ELDORADO 2026; Tokyo, Japan	March 28, 2026	
Nasukawa vacated the titlle in September 2026 in order to focus on his world title
5	(Japan) Jin Mandokoro def. Riku Kazushima	RISE 203; Tokyo, Japan	November 8, 2026	

=== Flyweight championship ===
Weight limit: 51 kg

No.	Name	Event	Date	Defenses
1	(Japan) Toki Tamaru def. Riku Kazushima	RISE 162; Tokyo, Japan	October 30, 2022	
Tamaru vacated the title on September 14, 2023 in order to move up in weight.
2	(Japan) Riku Kazushima def. Tenshi Matsumoto	RISE 172; Tokyo, Japan	October 29, 2023	
3	(Japan) Ryujin Nasukawa def. Riku Kazushima	RISE 183; Tokyo, Japan	November 23, 2024	
Nasukawa vacated the title in August 2025 in order to move up in weight.
4	(Japan) Tenshi Matsumoto def. Sora Tanazawa	RISE 196; Tokyo, Japan	February 23, 2026	1. def. Momu Tsukamoto at RISE World Series 2026 Tokyo 2 on September 19, 2026 in Tokyo, Japan

=== Queen championship ===
Weight limit: 48 kg

No.	Name	Event	Date	Defenses
1	(Japan) Rena def. Erika Kamimura	RISE 85; Tokyo, Japan	November 23, 2011	
2	(Japan) Erika Kamimura def. Momi	RISE 95; Tokyo, Japan	September 13, 2013	
Kamimura retired from the sport in August 2014

=== Women's Bantamweight championship ===
Weight limit: 55 kg

No.	Name	Event	Date	Defenses
1	(Japan) Seina def. Yuka Murakami	RISE 170; Tokyo, Japan	July 30, 2023	
Seina vacated the championship on January 8, 2026

=== Women's Flyweight championship ===
Weight limit: 52 kg

No.	Name	Event	Date	Defenses
1	(Japan) Manazo Kobayashi; Promoted to champion status	RISE 148; Tokyo, Japan	April 17, 2021	1. def. Suzuka Tabuchi at RISE 148 on April 17, 2021 in Tokyo, Japan
2	(Netherlands) Tessa de Kom def. Manazo Kobayashi	RISE 168; Tokyo, Japan	May 28, 2023	1. def. Arina Kobayashi at RISE 184 on December 15, 2024 in Tokyo, Japan; 2. def. Manazo Kobayashi at RISE 189 on June 29, 2025 in Tokyo, Japan; 3. def. Yaya Weerasakreck at RISE 202 on October 17, 2026 in Tokyo, Japan

=== Women's Mini Flyweight championship ===
Weight limit: 49 kg

No.	Name	Event	Date	Defenses
1	(Japan) Hinata Terayama def. Reina Sato	RISE 134; Tokyo, Japan	September 29, 2019	1. def. AKARI at RISE on Abema 2 on May 16, 2021 in Tokyo, Japan
Terayama retired from the sport on March 15, 2022
2	(Japan) Erika❤️ def. AKARI	RISE 159; Tokyo, Japan	June 24, 2022	
3	(Japan) Arina Kobayashi def. Erika❤️	RISE 173; Tokyo, Japan	November 18, 2023	
4	(Japan) Mei Miyamoto def. Arina Kobayashi	RISE Fire Ball; Nagoya, Japan	May 11, 2025	

=== Women's Atomweight championship ===
Weight limit: 46 kg

No.	Name	Event	Date	Defenses
1	(Japan) Momi Furuta def. Riri Nasukawa	RISE 133; Tokyo, Japan	July 5, 2019	1. def. Koto Hiraoka at RISE GIRLS POWER 2 on February 11, 2020 in Tokyo, Japan
2	(Japan) Koyuki Miyazaki def. Momi	RISE 146; Tokyo, Japan	March 28, 2021	1. def. Arina Kobayashi at RISE 158 on May 29, 2022 in Tokyo, Japan
Miyazaki vacated the title on March 30, 2025 in order to focus on her studies.
3	(Japan) Haruka Shimada def. Koto Hiraoka	RISE 194; Tokyo, Japan	December 14, 2025	

=== OFG Super Lightweight champion ===
Weight limit: 65 kg

No.	Name	Event	Date	Defenses
1	(Japan) YA-MAN def. Hiroto Yamaguchi	RISE World Series 2023 - 2nd Round; Tokyo, Japan	August 26, 2023	

== Tournaments champions ==
=== GLORY RISE Grand Prix Champions ===
GLORY RISE Featherweight Grand Prix
Date	Weight	Champion	Nationality	Event	Location	Runner-up	Nationality
2024-12-21	65 kg	Petpanomrung Kiatmuu9	Thailand	GLORY RISE Featherweight Grand Prix	Chiba, Japan	Miguel Trindade	Portugal

GLORY RISE Last Featherweight Standing
Date	Weight	Champion	Nationality	Event	Location	Runner-up	Nationality
2026-06-06	65 kg	Kento Haraguchi	Japan	RISE World Series 2026 Tokyo	Tokyo, Japan	Petpanomrung Kiatmuu9	Thailand

=== WORLD SERIES Champions ===
RISE WORLD SERIES
Date	Weight	Champion	Nationality	Event	Location	Runner-up	Nationality
2019-09-16	58 kg	Tenshin Nasukawa	Japan	RISE WORLD SERIES 2019 Final Round	Chiba, Japan	Shiro	Japan
2019-09-16	61 kg	Taiju Shiratori	Japan	RISE WORLD SERIES 2019 Final Round	Chiba, Japan	Genji Umeno	Japan
2023-12-16	54 kg	Toki Tamaru	Japan	RISE WORLD SERIES 2023 Final Round	Tokyo, Japan	Kumandoi Petchyindee Academy	Thailand
2025-08-02	61.5 kg	Kan Nakamura	Japan	RISE WORLD SERIES 2025 Final	Tokyo, Japan	Yuan Pengjie	China

=== Dead or Alive Tournament champions ===
RISE Dead or Alive Tournament
Date	Weight	Champion	Nationality	Event	Location	Runner-up	Nationality
2003-12-23	70 kg	Masaru Abe	Japan	R.I.S.E. DEAD or ALIVE Tournament	Tokyo, Japan	Ryusuke Mochizuki	Japan
2004-12-19	70 kg	Koichi Kikuchi	Japan	R.I.S.E. DEAD or ALIVE Tournament '04	Tokyo, Japan	Yuki	Japan
2005-12-18	70 kg	TATSUJI	Japan	R.I.S.E. DEAD or ALIVE Tournament '05	Tokyo, Japan	Hakuto	Japan
2006-12-17	70 kg	Keiji Ozaki	Japan	R.I.S.E. DEAD or ALIVE Tournament '06	Tokyo, Japan	Naoki Samukawa	Japan
2007-12-16	70 kg	Ryuji	Japan	R.I.S.E. DEAD or ALIVE Tournament '07	Tokyo, Japan	Yusuke Ikei	Japan
2017-11-23	57 kg	Taiki Naito	Japan	RISE 121	Tokyo, Japan	MOMOTARO	Japan
2020-11-01	63 kg	Kento Haraguchi	Japan	RISE DEAD OR ALIVE 2020 Osaka	Osaka, Japan	Naoki	Japan
2020-11-01	55 kg	Shiro	Japan	RISE DEAD OR ALIVE 2020 Osaka	Osaka, Japan	Masahiko Suzuki	Japan
2021-09-23	53 kg	Kazane	Japan	RISE WORLD SERIES 2021 Yokohama	Yokohama, Japan	Shiro	Japan

=== Mighty Eighty Tournament champions ===
MIGHTY 80 TOURNAMENT'06
Date	Champion	Nationality	Event	Location	Runner-up	Nationality
2006-09-24	Magnum Sakai	Japan	RISE MIGHTY EIGHTY TOURNAMENT'06	Tokyo, Japan	Jinushi	Japan

=== Heavyweight Tournament champions ===
2011 RISE Heavyweight Tournament
Date	Champion	Nationality	Event	Location	Runner-up	Nationality
2011-11-23	Jaideep Singh	India	RISE 85	Tokyo, Japan	Makoto Uehara	Japan

=== Queen of Queens Tournament champions ===
2020 Queen of Queens Tournament
Date	Weight	Champion	Nationality	Event	Location	Runner-up	Nationality
2020-11-01	48 kg	Hinata Terayama	Japan	RISE Dead or Alive Osaka	Osaka, Japan	Momi	Japan

== See also ==
- List of kickboxing organizations
