= Jin Mandokoro =

Japanese kickboxer (born 1998)

- Born: 政所 仁 3 September 1998 (age 28); Osaka, Japan
- Height: 1.63 m (5 ft 4 in)
- Weight: 53 kg (117 lb; 8.3 st)
- Division: Flyweight
- Style: Kickboxing
- Fighting out of: Osaka, Japan
- Team: Sakigake Jyuku
- Years active: 2015 - present

Kickboxing record
- Total: 38
- Wins: 24
- By knockout: 9
- Losses: 13
- By knockout: 1
- No contests: 1

Jin Mandokoro (born 3 September 1998) is a Japanese kickboxer.

Combat Press ranks him as the #4 strawweight in the world, as of August 2021. He was ranked in the flyweight top ten between September 2020, and July 2021.

== Kickboxing career ==
=== DEEP KICK ===
Jin was scheduled to fight Tatsuya Tsubakihara during Hoost Cup Kings Kyoto 2. Tsubakihara won the fight by unanimous decision.

In 2017 he made his RIZIN debut against Issei Ishii. Mandokoro won the fight by majority decision. He re-matched Issei Ishii at KNOCK OUT's Summer FES event. Ishii won the fight by unanimous decision.

In November 2018, at J-FIGHT, he fought Shota Toyama. Mandokoro won the fight by decision.

=== RISE ===
He was given a chance to fight for the RISE 53 kg title at RISE 132, held at the time by Toki Tamaru. Tamaru won the fight by unanimous decision.

Afterwards, he fought Senga at DEEP☆KICK, and once again dropped a unanimous decision.

He fought Koki Osaki during RISE 135, and won the bout by unanimous decision. He won his second in a row against Kyosuke, winning by a first round KO.

Mandokoro was scheduled to fight Kazuki Osaki during RISE 139. The fight was later cancelled due to the COVID-19 pandemic. The fight was subsequently rescheduled for RISE 140. Osaki won the fight by majority decision.

Mandokoro is scheduled to fight Syuto Sato during Rizin 25. He won the fight by unanimous decision.

During the Kyushu Professional Kickboxing vol.2 event, Mandokoro fought Tatsuya Hibata for the WBKF World Super Flyweight title. He won the fight by a third-round TKO.

Mandokoro was scheduled to fight Soma Tameda at RISE on ABEMA 2. The bout was a qualifier for the RISE Dead or Alive Tournament. Mandokoro won by a first round knockout. After qualifying for the tournament, Mandokoro was scheduled to fight Toki Tamaru in the quarterfinals of the 2021 RISE Dead or Alive 53 kg Tournament. He won the fight by unanimous decision. Advancing to the semifinals, Mandokoro was scheduled to face Kazane. Madokoro lost the fight by majority decision.

Mandokoro was scheduled to face Yu Hiramatsu at Rizin Trigger 1 on November 28, 2021. He won the fight by a second-round knockout.

Mandokoro was booked to face Syuto Sato at Rizin 34 – Osaka on March 20, 2022. The fight ended as a no contest after Sato injured his ankle in the first round.

Mandokoro faced the third ranked RISE super flyweight contender Ryu Hanaoka at RISE 161 on August 28, 2022. He lost the fight by a third-round technical knockout, due to doctor stoppage.

Mandokoro faced Koudai Hirayama at RISE 163 on December 10, 2022. He won the fight by unanimous decision, with all three judges scoring the bout 30–29 in his favor.

Mandokoro faced Kazane Nagai in a rematch at RISE World Series 2023 - 1st Round on July 2, 2023, in a -54 kg World Series reserve bout. He won the fight by split decision, after an extra fourth round was contested.

Mandokoro faced Ruben Seoane at RISE World Series 2023 - 2nd Round on August 26, 2023, once again in a -54 kg World Series reserve bout. He won the fight by a second-round technical knockout, after thrice knocking Seoane down.

Mandokoro took part in the RISE New Warriors Tournament, held at RISE 173 on November 18, 2023, and faced former opponent Ryu Hanaoka in the semifinals of the one-day tournament. Mandokoro was able to avenge his loss to Hanaoka, as he won the fight by a first-round knockout, and advanced to the finals, where he faced Kaito Hasegawa. Mandokoro captured the tournament title, as well as the right to challenge RISE Super Flyweight champion Kazuki Osaki, by unanimous decision.

Mandokoro challenged Kazuki Osaki for the RISE Super Flyweight title at RISE WORLD SERIES 2024 OSAKA on June 15, 2024. He lost the fight by unanimous decision, with two scorecards of 50–47 and one scorecard of 49–47 in his favor.

Mandokoro faced Ryu Hanaoka for the vacant RISE Super Flyweight (-53 kg) title at RISE 184 on December 15, 2024. He lost the fight by unanimous decision.

Mandokoro faced the first-ranked RISE flyweight Riku Kazushima in a super flyweight bout at RISE Fire Ball on May 11, 2025. He won the fight by split decision, with scores of 30—29, 30—29 and 29—30.

Mandokoro faced the RISE Flyweight champion Ryujin Nasukawa in a super flyweight bout at RISE WORLD SERIES 2025 Tokyo on August 2, 2025. He lost the fight by unanimous decision.

Mandokoro faced Shuri Sakayori at RISE 194 on December 14, 2025. He won the fight by a second-round knockout.

== Championships and accomplishments ==
=== Amateur ===
- DEEP KICK
  - 2010 TOP RUN -35 kg Champion
  - 2011 TOP RUN -40 kg Champion
  - 2013 TOP RUN -45 kg Champion
- All Japan Glove Karate Federation
  - 2011 All Japan Glove Karate Federation Middle School Champion
  - 2013 All Japan Glove Karate Federation Middle School Champion

=== Professional ===
- J-NETWORK
  - 2018 J-NETWORK Flyweight Champion
- World BARS Kickboxing Federation
  - 2021 WBKF World Super Flyweight Champion
- RISE
  - 2023 RISE New Warriors Tournament Winner
  - 2026 RISE Super Flyweight (-53 kg) Champion

== Fight record ==
Kickboxing record
24 Wins (9 (T)KO's), 13 Losses, 0 Draw, 1 No Contest
Date	Result	Opponent	Event	Location	Method	Round	Time
2026-11-08	Win	(Japan) Riku Kazushima	RISE 203	Tokyo, Japan	Decision (unanimous)	5	3:00
Won the vacant RISE Super Flyweight (-53 kg) title.
2026-09-25	Loss	(Kazakhstan) Arsen Soiykras	ONE The Inner Circle 32, Lumpinee Stadium	Bangkok, Thailand	Decision (majority)	3	3:00
2026-02-27	Win	(Russia) Eduard Markarian	ONE Friday Fights 144, Lumpinee Stadium	Bangkok, Thailand	TKO (high kick)	2	2:22
2025-12-14	Win	(Japan) Shuri Sakayori	RISE 194	Tokyo, Japan	TKO (referee stoppage)	2	1:50
2025-08-02	Loss	(Japan) Ryujin Nasukawa	RISE WORLD SERIES 2025 Tokyo	Tokyo, Japan	Decision (unanimous)	3	3:00
2025-05-11	Win	(Japan) Riku Kazushima	RISE Fire Ball	Nagoya, Japan	Decision (split)	3	3:00
2024-12-15	Loss	(Japan) Ryu Hanaoka	RISE 184	Tokyo, Japan	Decision (unanimous)	5	3:00
For the vacant RISE Super Flyweight (-53 kg) title.
2024-06-15	Loss	(Japan) Kazuki Osaki	RISE WORLD SERIES 2024 OSAKA	Osaka, Japan	Decision (unanimous)	5	3:00
For the RISE Super Flyweight (-53 kg) title.
2023-11-18	Win	(Japan) Kaito Hasegawa	RISE 173 - New Warriors Tournament, Final	Tokyo, Japan	Decision (unanimous)	3	3:00
RISE Super Flyweight (-53 kg) title eliminator.
2023-11-18	Win	(Japan) Ryu Hanaoka	RISE 173 - New Warriors Tournament, Semifinals	Tokyo, Japan	TKO (2 knockdowns)	1	2:15
2023-08-26	Win	(Spain) Ruben Seoane	RISE World Series 2023 - 2nd Round - Tournament reserve fight	Tokyo, Japan	TKO (3 Knockdowns)	2	1:55
2023-07-02	Win	(Japan) Kazane	RISE World Series 2023 - 1st Round - Tournament reserve fight	Osaka, Japan	Ext.R Decision (split)	4	3:00
2022-12-10	Win	(Japan) Koudai	RISE 163	Tokyo, Japan	Decision (unanimous)	3	3:00
2022-08-28	Loss	(Japan) Ryu Hanaoka	RISE 161	Tokyo, Japan	TKO (doctor stoppage)	3	0:21
2022-03-20	NC	(Japan) Syuto Sato	Rizin 34 – Osaka	Tokyo, Japan	No contest (ankle injury)	1	
2021-11-28	Win	(Japan) Yu Hiramatsu	Rizin Trigger 1	Kobe, Japan	KO (right Cross)	2	1:08
2021-09-23	Loss	(Japan) Kazane	RISE WORLD SERIES 2021 Yokohama - Dead or Alive Tournament, Semi Final	Yokohama, Japan	Decision (majority)	3	3:00
2021-07-18	Win	(Japan) Toki Tamaru	RISE WORLD SERIES 2021 Osaka - Dead or Alive Tournament, Quarter Final	Osaka, Japan	Decision (unanimous)	3	3:00
2021-05-16	Win	(Japan) Soma Tameda	RISE on Abema 2	Tokyo, Japan	KO (uppercut and cross)	1	2:50
2021-02-14	Win	(Japan) Tatsuya Hibata	Kyushu Professional Kickboxing vol.2	Fukuoka, Japan	TKO	3	
Wins WBKF World Super Flyweight title.
2020-11-21	Win	(Japan) Syuto Sato	Rizin 25 - Osaka	Osaka, Japan	Decision (unanimous)	3	3:00
2020-07-19	Loss	(Japan) Kazuki Osaki	RISE 140	Tokyo, Japan	Ext.R Decision (majority)	4	3:00
2020-02-23	Win	(Japan) Kyosuke	RISE 137	Tokyo, Japan	KO (Right Straight)	1	2:39
2019-11-04	Win	(Japan) Koki Osaki	RISE 135	Tokyo, Japan	Decision (unanimous)	3	3:00
2019-09-15	Loss	(Japan) Koudai	DEEP KICK 40	Osaka, Japan	Decision (unanimous)	3	3:00
For the DEEP KICK -53kg title.
2019-05-19	Loss	(Japan) Toki Tamaru	RISE 132	Tokyo, Japan	Decision (unanimous)	5	3:00
For the RISE -53kg title.
2019-03-23	Win	(Japan) Shota Takiya	RISE 131	Tokyo, Japan	Decision (unanimous)	3	3:00
2018-11-18	Win	(Japan) Shota Toyama	J-FIGHT ＆ J-GIRLS 2018 ～4th～	Tokyo, Japan	Decision (majority)	5	3:00
Wins the J-NETWORK Flyweight title.
2018-08-19	Loss	(Japan) Issei Ishii	KNOCK OUT SUMMER FES.2018	Tokyo, Japan	Decision (unanimous)	5	3:00
2018-05-24	Win	(Japan) Shota Takiya	RISE 124	Tokyo, Japan	Decision (unanimous)	3	3:00
2018-02-04	Win	(Japan) Kazuya Okuwaki	RISE 122	Tokyo, Japan	Decision (unanimous)	3	3:00
2017-10-15	Win	(Japan) Issei Ishii	Rizin World Grand Prix 2017: Opening Round - Part 2	Fukuoka, Japan	Decision (majority)	3	3:00
2017-07-16	Loss	(Japan) Koudai	DEEP KICK 33	Osaka, Japan	Decision (Split)	3	3:00
2017-03-05	Loss	(Japan) Tatsuya Tsubakihara	Hoost Cup Kings Kyoto 2	Kyoto, Japan	Decision (unanimous)	3	3:00
2016-11-03	Win	(Japan) Takasuke	DEEP KICK 31	Osaka, Japan	TKO (flying knee)	3	0:33
2016-07-17	Loss	(Japan) Yoshiho Tane	DEEP KICK 30	Osaka, Japan	Decision (unanimous)	3	3:00
2016-03-21	Win	(Japan) Ikki	DEEP KICK 29	Osaka, Japan	Decision (split)	3	3:00
2015-12-23	Win	(Japan) Yuto Kuroda	DEEP KICK 28	Osaka, Japan	Decision (unanimous)	3	3:00
Legend: Win Loss Draw/No contest Notes

=== Amateur record ===
Amateur Kickboxing record
Date	Result	Opponent	Event	Location	Method	Round	Time
2015-07-16	Win	(Japan) Iori Nishimura	Fighting Championship Mie 2015	Osaka, Japan	Decision (unanimous)	2	2:00
2014-12-23	Win	(Japan) Kaito Nagasawa	NEXT LEVEL Kansai 19	Osaka, Japan	TKO	2	
2014-08-03	Loss	(Japan) Yoshiho Tane	NEXT LEVEL Kansai 16	Osaka, Japan	Decision (majority)	2	2:00
2013-04-14	Loss	(Japan) Kouki Higashi	NEXT LEVEL Kansai 6	Osaka, Japan	Decision (majority)	2	2:00
2013-04-14	Win	(Japan) Tasuku Nakajima	NEXT LEVEL Kansai 6	Osaka, Japan	Decision	2	2:00
2013-03-31	Loss	(Japan) Kouki Higashi	2013 All Japan Jr. Kick, -45 kg Semi Final	Tokyo, Japan	Decision	2	2:00
2013-03-31	Win	(Japan) Kizuki Akiyama	2013 All Japan Jr. Kick, -45 kg Quarter Final	Tokyo, Japan	Decision	2	2:00
2013-02-10	Loss	(Japan) Kouki Higashi	Double Impact III, All Japan Jr Kick Kansai Selection	Osaka, Japan	Decision (unanimous)		
2012-10-14	Draw	(Japan) Yoshiki Tane	TOP RUN 4	Osaka, Japan	Decision	3	2:00
For the TOP RUN -45kg title.
2012-09-23	Loss	(Japan) Tatsuki Ida	NEXT LEVEL Kansai 1, Final	Sakai, Japan	Decision (unanimous)	2	2:00
2012-09-23	Win	(Japan) Hiroto Ichimura	NEXT LEVEL Kansai 1, Semi Final	Sakai, Japan	Decision (majority)	2	2:00
2012-07-08	Loss	(Japan) Yoshiki Tane	DEEP KICK 12	Osaka, Japan	Decision (majority)	2	2:00
2012-04-29	Draw	(Japan) Kouki Higashi	DEEP KICK 11	Osaka, Japan	Decision	3	2:00
Defends the TOP RUN -40kg title.
2011-10-23	Win	(Japan) Kouki Higashi	DEEP KICK 8	Osaka, Japan	Decision	3	2:00
Wins the TOP RUN -40kg title.
2011-04-10	Loss	(Japan) Takuro Matsunaga	DEEP KICK 6	Osaka, Japan	Decision (unanimous)	2	2:00
For the TOP RUN -40kg title.
Legend: Win Loss Draw/No contest Notes

== See also ==
- List of male kickboxers
