= Shiro (kickboxer) =

Japanese kickboxer (born 1993)

- Born: Shirō Matsumoto (松本志朗); June 23, 1993 (age 33); Saitama, Japan
- Other names: Shiro Petkiatpetch
- Height: 165 cm (5 ft 5 in)
- Weight: 55 kg (121.3 lb; 8.7 st)
- Division: Super Flyweight; Bantamweight; Super Bantamweight; Featherweight
- Style: Kickboxing
- Stance: Orthodox
- Fighting out of: Tokyo, Japan
- Team: BeWELL Kickboxing Gym
- Trainer: Klangsuan Sasiprapa
- Years active: 2009 - present

Kickboxing record
- Total: 78
- Wins: 55
- By knockout: 19
- Losses: 18
- By knockout: 2
- Draws: 4
- No contests: 1

Other information
- Website: http://shirou-muaythai.com/

Shiro Matsumoto (松本志朗, Matsumoto Shirō; born June 23, 1993), better known by his ring name Shiro, is a Japanese Muay Thai fighter and kickboxer. He currently competes in the bantamweight division of RISE, where he is the inaugural and current RISE Bantamweight World champion.

Shiro is the 2020 RISE DoA Bantamweight tournament winner, the 2021 RISE DoA Super Flyweight tournament runner-up and the 2019 RISE World Series tournament runner-up. As a muay thai fighter, he held the Rangsit Stadium International Bantamweight championship and the ISKA Muay Thai World Bantamweight championship.

Since August 2023, Shiro has been ranked as the best flyweight (-56.7 kg) kickboxer in the world by Combat Press and the best super flyweight (-55 kg) kickboxer by Beyond Kick. Combat Press has continually ranked him as a top ten fighter under 58 kg since September 2020. He’s currently #6 in the pound for pound rankings.

== Professional career ==
=== Muay thai career ===
Shiro entered a special schedule high school so that he could spend time training and fighting in Thailand during the year at the 96 Penang Gym. Shiro made his debut in 2009, in the renowned Lumpini Stadium, against Sensak Siwarugni. He won the fight by decision. He amassed a 12-4 record over the next three years, earning a chance to fight Rui Ebata for the SNKA Bantamweight title at the SNKA BRAVE HEARTS 19. The fight ended in a draw.

During the SNKA WINNERS 2016 event, Shiro fought Daniel McGowan for the ISKA World Muay Thai Bantamweight title. He won the fight by a unanimous decision. For his first title defense, he fought Adrian Lopez at SNKA WINNERS 2017 2nd. Shiro won the fight by a third round KO. For his second title defense, Shiro was scheduled to fight Gonsalo Tebar at the HOOST CUP Nagoya 4. He won the fight by a second round body kick KO.

=== RISE tournaments ===
==== Featherweight DoA Tournament ====
Shiro took part in the 2019 Rise World Series Featherweight (-58 kg) tournament. In the quarterfinals, held on March 10, 2019, he faced Vladyslav Mykytas. Shiro won the fight by a third round knockout. He first knocked his opponent down with a low kick and stopped him with another low kick shortly after. Shiro advanced to the semifinals, held on July 21, 2019, where he faced the Rajadamnern Stadium super featherweight champion Rungkit Wor.Sanprapai. He won the fight by split decision, after an extra fourth round was contested. Shiro faced the pound for pound talent Tenshin Nasukawa in the finals, which were held on September 16, 2019. Nasukawa won the fight by a unanimous decision, with two scorecards of 30–28 and one scorecard of 30–29.

Shiro faced Yuki Kyotani in a bantamweight (-55 kg) bout at RISE 136 on January 13, 2020. He won the fight by majority decision, with scores of 29–29, 30–29 and 30–29. Shiro was next scheduled to faced Kiyoshi at RISE 140 on July 19, 2020. He won the fight by a first-round knockout, flooring Kiyoshi with a right cross 64 seconds into the bout.

==== Bantamweight DoA Tournament ====
Shiro took part in the 2020 RISE Dead or Alive Bantamweight (-55 kg) Tournament. The entire one-day tournament was held at RISE DEAD OR ALIVE 2020 Osaka on November 1, 2020. He was expected to face the former BigBang Super Bantamweight champion Rasta Kido in the semifinals. Kido withdrew from the tournament on October 8, as he failed to sufficiently recover from a right orbital floor fracture he sustained in his September 27, 2020, bout with Mutsuki Ebata. He was replaced by the former SHOOTBOXING Japan super bantamweight champion Seiki Ueyama, who stepped in on a month's notice. Shiro won the fight by majority decision. Two of the judges scored the fight 30–29 and 30–28 in his favor, while the third judge scored the fight an even 29–29 draw. Shiro advanced to the finals, where he faced the reigning RISE Bantamweight champion Masahiko Suzuki. He won the fight by a dominant unanimous decision, with all three judges awarding him every single round of the bout. He was given a 5 million yen prize for winning the tournament, which he donated for the 2020 Kyushu floods relief. Aside from winning the money prize, capturing the tournament title earned Shiro the chance to face Tenshin Nasukawa for the second time.

Shiro was booked to rematch Tenshin Nasukawa on February 28, 2021, in the main event of Rise Eldorado 2021. He lost the fight by unanimous decision, with all three judges scoring the fight 30–28 for Nasukawa.

==== Super Flyweight DoA Tournament ====
Shiro was expected to face the RISE Super Flyweight (-53 kg) champion Kazuki Osaki in a bantamweight (-55 kg) bout, at RISE on Abema on May 15, 2021. Osaki withdrew from the bout due to COVID-19 related issues on May 12. Shiro instead faced Issei Ishii in an exhibition bout, which ended in pre-determined draw.

Shiro was booked to face Koudai Hirayama in the quarterfinals of the 2021 RISE Dead or Alive Super Flyweight (-53 kg) Tournament, which were held on July 18, 2021. The fight was ruled a majority decision draw after the first three rounds were contested, with one judge scoring it 30–29 for Shiro, while the remaining two judges scored it a 30–30 draw. Shiro knocked Koudai down with a one-two in the extra fourth round, which awarded him a 10-8 round on all three of the judges scorecards for a unanimous decision win. Shiro was expected to face Kazuki Osaki in the tournament semifinals, which took place on September 23, 2021. Osaki withdrew from the bout with an ankle injury on August 24, and was replaced by his brother Koki Osaki. Koki Osaki missed weight by 3.2 kg at the official weigh-ins and was accordingly replaced by Koudai. Shiro beat Koudai for the second time in two months, once again by unanimous decision, with two scorecards of 30–28 and one scorecard of 30–29. He advanced to the tournament finals, which were likewise held on September 23. Shiro lost the final match against by an extra round unanimous decision.

=== RISE Bantamweight World champion ===
==== Title run ====
Shiro faced the KNOCK OUT Super Bantamweight champion Rui Ebata at RISE El Dorado 2022 on April 2, 2022. He won the fight by a second-round knockout, flooring Ebata with a high kick.

Shiro faced the two-time K-1 super bantamweight World Grand Prix runner-up Masashi Kumura at The Match 2022 on June 19, 2022. He lost the fight by a narrow unanimous decision.

Shiro faced Koki Osaki at RISE World Series 2022 on October 15, 2022. They were initially expected to face each other in the semifinals of the 2021 RISE "Dead or Alive" bantamweight tournament, before the fight was cancelled due to Osaki missing weight. Shiro won the fight by unanimous decision after an extra fourth round was contested, as the bout was ruled a draw following the first three rounds, with all three judges scoring it 29–29.

Shiro faced the reigning RISE Bantamweight champion Masahiko Suzuki in a non-title bout at RISE WORLD SERIES / SHOOTBOXING-KINGS on December 25, 2022. He won the fight by majority decision, with scores of 30–29, 30–29 and 29–29.

Shiro faced Diesellek Wor.Wanchai for the inaugural RISE Bantamweight World Championship at RISE EL DORADO 2023 on March 26, 2023. He won the fight by a fifth-round knockout, flooring Diesellek with a head kick at the 2:38 minute mark of the final round.

==== World Series tournament ====
Shiro faced Ruben Seoane in the quarterfinals of the 2023 RISE World Series, held on July 2, 2023. He won the fight by unanimous decision, with all three judges scoring the bout 30–29 in his favor. Shiro advanced to the tournament semifinals, held on August 26, where he faced the one-time Rajadamnern Stadium champion Kumandoi Petchyindee Academy. He lost the fight by unanimous decision, with scores of 30–28, 29–27 and 30–27. Shiro was knocked down with a right straight in the second round, which proved pivotal on two of the judges' scorecards.

==== Title reign ====
Shiro faced Boonlong PetchyindeeAcademy at RISE WORLD SERIES 2023 Final Round on December 16, 2023. He won the fight by a first-round knockout.

Shiro was expected to make his first RISE Bantamweight (-55kg) World title defense against Toki Tamaru at RISE ELDORADO 2024 on March 17, 2024. The fight ended in a no-contest, as an accidental clash of heads left Shiro unable to continue competing.

Shiro faced the ISKA Argentina Featherweight champion Christian Manzo at RISE 179 on June 30, 2024. He won the fight by unanimous decision.

Shiro made his first RISE Bantamweight (-55kg) World title defense against Toki Tamaru at RISE WORLD SERIES 2024 YOKOHAMA on September 8, 2024. He won the fight by unanimous decision. Shiro revealed, during a post-fight press conference, that he was suffering from a boxer's knuckle in his right hand.

Shiro faced Deok Jae Yoon at RISE ELDORADO 2025 on March 29, 2025. He won the fight by unanimous decision, with scores of 30—27, 30—27 and 30—28.

Shiro made his second RISE Bantamweight (-55kg) World title defense against the two-time K-1 Super Bantamweight Grand Prix finalist Masashi Kumura at RISE World Series 2025 Tokyo on August 2, 2025. He thrice knocked Kumura down en route to winning the fight by unanimous decision.

== Titles and accomplishments ==
- Rangsit Stadium
  - 2013 Rangsit Stadium International Bantamweight Champion
- International Sport Kickboxing Association
  - 2016 ISKA Muay Thai World Bantamweight Champion
    - Two successful title defenses
- RISE
  - 2019 RISE World Series 58 kg Tournament Runner-up
  - 2020 RISE Dead or Alive 55 kg Tournament Winner
  - 2021 RISE Dead or Alive -53 kg Tournament Runner-up
  - 2023 RISE Bantamweight (-55kg) World Champion
    - Two successful title defenses

Awards

- eFight.jp
  - Fighter of the Month (January 2017, July 2019)

== Fight record ==
Muay Thai & Kickboxing record
55 wins (19 (T)KO's), 18 losses, 4 Draws, 1 No Contest
| Date | Result | Opponent | Event | Location | Method | Round | Time |
| 2026-03-28 | Loss | (Japan) Koki Osaki | RISE ELDORADO 2026 | Tokyo, Japan | Decision (Unanimous) | 5 | 3:00 |
Loses the RISE World Bantamweight (-55kg) title.
| 2025-11-02 | Win | (Thailand) Petchsaenkom Sor.Sommai | RISE World Series 2025 Final | Tokyo, Japan | KO (Right cross) | 2 | 0:29 |
| 2025-08-02 | Win | (Japan) Masashi Kumura | RISE World Series 2025 Tokyo | Tokyo, Japan | Decision (Unanimous) | 5 | 3:00 |
Defends the RISE World Bantamweight (-55kg) title.
| 2025-03-29 | Win | (South Korea) Deok Jae Yoon | RISE ELDORADO 2025 | Tokyo, Japan | Decision (Unanimous) | 3 | 3:00 |
| 2024-09-08 | Win | (Japan) Toki Tamaru | RISE WORLD SERIES 2024 YOKOHAMA | Yokohama, Japan | Decision (Unanimous) | 5 | 3:00 |
Defends the RISE World Bantamweight (-55kg) title.
| 2024-06-30 | Win | (Argentina) Christian Manzo | RISE 179 | Tokyo, Japan | Decision (Unanimous) | 3 | 3:00 |
| 2024-03-17 | NC | (Japan) Toki Tamaru | RISE ELDORADO 2024 | Tokyo, Japan | Doctor stop. (head clash) | 1 | 3:00 |
Defending the RISE World Bantamweight (-55kg) title.
| 2023-12-16 | Win | (Thailand) Boonlong PetchyindeeAcademy | RISE World Series 2023 - Final Round | Tokyo, Japan | TKO (Right cross) | 1 | 2:28 |
| 2023-08-26 | Loss | (Thailand) Kumandoi Petchyindee Academy | RISE World Series 2023 - 2nd Round | Tokyo, Japan | Decision (Unanimous) | 3 | 3:00 |
| 2023-07-02 | Win | (Spain) Ruben Seoane | RISE World Series 2023 - 1st Round | Osaka, Japan | Decision (Unanimous) | 3 | 3:00 |
| 2023-03-26 | Win | (Thailand) Diesellek Wor.Wanchai | RISE ELDORADO 2023 | Tokyo, Japan | KO (High kick) | 5 | 2:38 |
Wins the inaugural RISE World Bantamweight (-55kg) title.
| 2022-12-25 | Win | (Japan) Masahiko Suzuki | RISE WORLD SERIES / SHOOTBOXING-KINGS 2022 | Tokyo, Japan | Decision (Majority) | 3 | 3:00 |
| 2022-10-15 | Win | (Japan) Koki Osaki | RISE WORLD SERIES 2022 | Tokyo, Japan | Ext.R Decision (Unanimous) | 4 | 3:00 |
| 2022-06-19 | Loss | (Japan) Masashi Kumura | THE MATCH 2022 | Tokyo, Japan | Decision (Unanimous) | 3 | 3:00 |
| 2022-04-02 | Win | (Japan) Rui Ebata | RISE El Dorado 2022 | Tokyo, Japan | KO (Right high kick) | 2 | 1:39 |
| 2021-09-23 | Loss | (Japan) Kazane | RISE WORLD SERIES 2021 Yokohama - Dead or Alive Tournament, Final | Yokohama, Japan | Ext. R. Decision (Unanimous) | 4 | 3:00 |
For the RISE -53kg Dead or Alive Tournament title.
| 2021-09-23 | Win | (Japan) Koudai | RISE WORLD SERIES 2021 Yokohama - Dead or Alive Tournament, Semi Final | Yokohama, Japan | Decision (Unanimous) | 3 | 3:00 |
| 2021-07-18 | Win | (Japan) Koudai | RISE WORLD SERIES 2021 Osaka - Dead or Alive Tournament, Quarter Final | Osaka, Japan | Ext.R Decision (Unanimous) | 4 | 3:00 |
| 2021-02-28 | Loss | (Japan) Tenshin Nasukawa | Rise Eldorado 2021 | Yokohama, Japan | Decision (Unanimous) | 3 | 3:00 |
| 2020-11-01 | Win | (Japan) Masahiko Suzuki | RISE DEAD OR ALIVE 2020 Osaka, Final | Osaka, Japan | Decision (Unanimous) | 3 | 3:00 |
Wins RISE Dead or Alive -55kg Tournament title
| 2020-11-01 | Win | (Japan) Seiki Ueyama | RISE DEAD OR ALIVE 2020 Osaka, Semi Final | Osaka, Japan | Decision (Majority) | 3 | 3:00 |
| 2020-07-19 | Win | (Japan) Kiyoshi | RISE 140 | Tokyo, Japan | KO (Right Cross) | 1 | 1:04 |
| 2020-01-13 | Win | (Japan) Yuki Kyotani | RISE 136 | Tokyo, Japan | Decision (Majority) | 3 | 3:00 |
| 2019-09-16 | Loss | (Japan) Tenshin Nasukawa | Rise World Series 2019 Final | Chiba (city), Japan | Decision (Unanimous) | 3 | 3:00 |
For the RISE World Series -58kg Tournament title
| 2019-07-21 | Win | (Thailand) Rungkit Wor.Sanprapai | Rise World Series 2019 Semi Finals | Osaka, Japan | Ext.R Decision (Split) | 4 | 3:00 |
| 2019-03-10 | Win | (Ukraine) Vladyslav Mykytas | Rise World Series 2019 First Round | Ōta, Tokyo, Japan | KO (Low kick) | 3 | 1:10 |
| 2019-01-06 | Win | (Thailand) Petsamlek Or.Por.Tor Nonyantoi | OrTorGor.3 Stadium | Nonthaburi, Thailand | Decision | 5 | 3:00 |
| 2018-11-17 | Win | (Japan) Masahide Kudo | RISE 129 | Tokyo, Japan | Decision (Unanimous) | 3 | 3:00 |
| 2018-09-29 | Loss | (Thailand) Petchatsawin Sitsarawatseur | Lumpinee Stadium | Bangkok, Thailand | Decision | 5 | 3:00 |
| 2018-09-01 | Win | (Thailand) Kangkawdaeng Huarongnamkeng | Lumpinee Stadium | Bangkok, Thailand | Decision | 5 | 3:00 |
| 2018-07-07 | Win | (Thailand) Kritphet Rattanapanu | Lumpinee Stadium | Bangkok, Thailand | Decision | 5 | 3:00 |
| 2018-05-20 | Win | (Spain) Gonzalo Tebar | HOOST CUP Nagoya 4 | Nagoya, Japan | KO (Body kick) | 2 | 2:43 |
Defends the ISKA Muay Thai World Bantamweight title.
| 2018-04-14 | Loss | (Thailand) Jawsuayai Sor.Dechaphan | Lumpinee Stadium | Bangkok, Thailand | KO (Flying knee) | 3 | |
| 2018-03-17 | Win | (Thailand) Dabngoen Dabransarakarm | Lumpinee Stadium | Bangkok, Thailand | Decision | 5 | 3:00 |
| 2018-01-13 | Win | (Thailand) Chuphet Sitpanancheong | Lumpinee Stadium | Bangkok, Thailand | KO (Front kick to the body) | 4 | |
| 2017-12-09 | Win | (Thailand) Sangsawang Kasemhuas | Lumpinee Stadium | Bangkok, Thailand | KO (Punches) | 3 | |
| 2017-09-16 | Loss | (Thailand) Liampatak Sinbeemuaythai | Lumpinee Stadium | Bangkok, Thailand | Decision | 5 | 3:00 |
| 2017-07-22 | Loss | (Thailand) Kaensak Sakrangshit | Lumpinee Stadium | Bangkok, Thailand | Decision | 5 | 3:00 |
| 2017-06-30 | Win | (Thailand) Nuepetch sitlomnow | Lumpinee Stadium | Bangkok, Thailand | Decision | 3 | 3:00 |
| 2017-05-14 | Win | (Spain) Adrian Lopez | SNKA WINNERS 2017 2nd | Tokyo, Japan | KO (Left Hook) | 3 | 1:50 |
Defends the ISKA Muay Thai World Bantamweight title.
| 2017-03-25 | Win | (Thailand) Daocherndoi Sitnayokpidej | Lumpinee Stadium | Bangkok, Thailand | Decision | 5 | 3:00 |
| 2017-01-08 | Win | (Thailand) Prakaipet Nitisamui | SNKA WINNERS 2017 1st | Tokyo, Japan | KO (Right Cross) | 5 | 3:00 |
| 2016-05-15 | Draw | (Republic of Ireland) Ryan Sheehan | SNKA WINNERS 2016 2nd | Tokyo, Japan | Decision (Majority) | 3 | 3:00 |
| 2016-02-28 | Draw | (Thailand) Extra Chor Sampeenong | Max Muay Thai | Pattaya, Thailand | Decision | 3 | 3:00 |
| 2016-01-10 | Win | (England) Daniel McGowan | SNKA WINNERS 2016 | Tokyo, Japan | Decision (Unanimous) | 5 | 3:00 |
Wins the vacant ISKA Muay Thai World Bantamweight title.
| 2015-10-04 | Win | (Thailand) | | Bangkok, Thailand | Decision | 5 | 3:00 |
| 2015-05-17 | Win | (Spain) Nestor Rodriguez | SNKA WINNERS 2015 2nd | Tokyo, Japan | KO (Front kick to the body) | 4 | 0:57 |
| 2015-03-17 | Win | (Thailand) Tongsam Sor.Gulwon | KICK REVOLUTION 2015 - Rajadamnern Stadium | Bangkok, Thailand | Decision | 5 | 3:00 |
| 2015-01-11 | Win | (Japan) Kunitaka | SNKA WINNERS 2015 1st | Tokyo, Japan | Decision (Unanimous) | 5 | 3:00 |
| 2014-07-06 | Win | (Thailand) Sengsakda Chor Watchara | Kick Revolution 2014 Japan vs Thai 5 vs 5 - Rangsit Stadium | Rangsit, Thailand | Decision | 5 | 3:00 |
| 2014-06-07 | Loss | (Thailand) Yodophet SuanaanPeekmai | Lumpinee Stadium | Bangkok, Thailand | Decision | 5 | 3:00 |
| 2014-01-12 | Win | (Japan) Keisuke Miyamoto | SNKA WINNERS 2014 | Tokyo, Japan | Decision (Unanimous) | 5 | 3:00 |
| 2013-08-25 | Win | (Thailand) Payak Kamlon | Rangsit Stadium | Rangsit, Thailand | Decision | 5 | 3:00 |
Wins the Rangsit International Stadium Bantamweight title.
| 2013-06-24 | Loss | (Thailand) Gon Or Kunton | Rajadamnern Stadium | Bangkok, Thailand | Decision | 5 | 3:00 |
| 2013-05-19 | Win | (Thailand) Sairomnoi Tidetgaugaew | SNKA BRAVE HEARTS 22 | Bangkok, Thailand | KO (Backfist) | 5 | 2:27 |
| 2013-03-08 | Loss | (Thailand) | Rajadamnern Stadium | Bangkok, Thailand | TKO | 2 | |
| 2013-02-28 | Loss | (Thailand) Gon Or Kunton | Rajadamnern Stadium | Bangkok, Thailand | Decision | 5 | 3:00 |
| 2013-01-13 | Draw | (Thailand) Fonphet Chuwattana | SNKA BRAVE HEARTS 21 | Tokyo, Japan | Decision | 5 | 3:00 |
| 2012-08-26 | Win | (Thailand) Jomrachan Kiatworatha | SNKA BRAVE HEARTS 20 | Tokyo, Japan | KO | 2 | 1:12 |
| 2012-07-01 | Win | (Thailand) Rabu Bor.Khor Sor | Rajadamnern Stadium | Bangkok, Thailand | Decision | 5 | 3:00 |
| 2012-05-13 | Draw | (Japan) Rui Ebata | SNKA BRAVE HEARTS 19 | Tokyo, Japan | Decision | 5 | 3:00 |
For the SNKA Bantamweight title.
| 2012-01-15 | Win | (Japan) Daihachi Furuoka | SNKA BRAVE HEARTS 18 | Tokyo, Japan | Decision (Unanimous) | 3 | 3:00 |
| 2011-10-09 | Win | (Thailand) Nonpaao Chokbraneefarn | Rajadamnern Stadium | Bangkok, Thailand | Decision | 5 | 3:00 |
| 2011-08-28 | Win | (Thailand) Rajasaklek Sor.Worapin | SNKA BRAVE HEARTS 17 | Tokyo, Japan | Decision | 3 | 3:00 |
| 2011-07 | Win | (Thailand) Dark Agkan | CABARAN TOMOI DUNIA Z1, Final | Malaysia | KO | 3 | |
| 2011-07 | Win | (Malaysia) Fidas Janay | CABARAN TOMOI DUNIA Z1, Semi Final | Malaysia | KO | 3 | |
| 2011-05-15 | Loss | (Japan) Rui Ebata | SNKA BRAVE HEARTS 16 | Tokyo, Japan | Decision (Unanimous) | 3 | 3:00 |
| 2011-04-11 | Loss | (Thailand) Sensak Siwarugni | | Thailand | Decision | 5 | 3:00 |
| 2011-03-08 | Win | (Thailand) Tawee Uoruntawee | Chon Buri Stadium | Chon Buri, Thailand | Decision | 5 | 3:00 |
| 2011-01-16 | Win | (Japan) Yasuhiko Abe | SNKA BRAVE HEARTS 15 | Tokyo, Japan | Decision | 3 | 3:00 |
| 2010-12-08 | Win | (Thailand) Tawee Uoruntawee | | Thailand | TKO | 4 | |
| 2010-11-06 | Loss | (Thailand) Yodogen | | Thailand | Decision | 5 | 3:00 |
| 2010-08-29 | Win | (Japan) Rajin Hamada | SNKA BRAVE HEARTS 14 | Tokyo, Japan | TKO | 2 | 2:45 |
| 2010-05-16 | Win | (Japan) Masanori Usui | SNKA Kozo Takeda Retirement Ceremony | Tokyo, Japan | Decision | 5 | 3:00 |
| 2010-01-17 | Win | (Japan) Takayuki Hashimoto | SNKA BRAVE HEARTS 13 | Tokyo, Japan | TKO | 2 | 1:49 |
| 2009-11-21 | Win | (Thailand) Sensak Siwarugni | Lumpinee Stadium | Bangkok, Thailand | Decision | 5 | 3:00 |
| 2009-10-03 | Loss | (France) Rio Siamboxinggym | Lumpinee Stadium | Bangkok, Thailand | Decision | 5 | 3:00 |
| 2009-08-15 | Win | (Thailand) Sensak Siwarugni | Lumpinee Stadium | Bangkok, Thailand | Decision | 5 | 3:00 |
Legend: Win Loss Draw/No contest Notes

== See also ==
- List of male kickboxers
