= Toki Tamaru =

Japanese kickboxer (born 2002)

- Born: 田丸辰; February 6, 2002 (age 24); Tokyo, Japan
- Other names: Jet Boy
- Height: 163 cm (5 ft 4 in)
- Weight: 53.0 kg (116.8 lb; 8.35 st)
- Style: Kickboxing
- Stance: Southpaw
- Fighting out of: Tokyo, Japan
- Team: Vasileus Gym (2025 - Present); TRY HARD GYM (2020 - 2025); Hirai Dojo (2017 - 2019)
- Years active: 2017 - present

Kickboxing record
- Total: 25
- Wins: 19
- By knockout: 4
- Losses: 4
- By knockout: 0
- No contests: 2

Mixed martial arts record
- Total: 1
- Wins: 0
- Losses: 1
- By decision: 1

Toki Tamaru (born February 6, 2002) is a Japanese kickboxer, currently competing in the super flyweight division of RISE. He is the former RISE Flyweight champion, the former RISE Super Flyweight champion and the RISE -54 kg World Series Tournament Winner. As of August 2025, he is ranked number one in the world at (54 kilogram and below) and ranked 7th in the pound for pound.

== Kickboxing career ==
=== RISE super flyweight champion ===
==== Early career ====
He made his RISE debut against Shota Toyama. Toki defeated Toyama by decision. Tamaru had his second fight with RISE during RISE 126, when he fought KING Takeshi. Tamaru beat him by decision. He fought Yuya Hayashi during RISE 127. Tamaru won the fight by decision.

==== Title reign ====
Toki faced Azusa Kaneko for the inaugural RISE Super Flyweight championship at RISE 128 on November 2, 2018. Tamaru won the fight by unanimous decision. Two of the judges scored the fight 49–45 in his favor, while the third judge scored bout 50–44 for him. Tamaru knocked Kaneko down once, with a left hook in the third round.

After winning the title, Tamaru faced Kazuki in a non-title bout, at RISE 130 on February 3, 2019. Tamaru won the fight knockout, dropping Kazuki with a left straight less than two minutes into the fight.

Tamaru made his first title defense against the second ranked RISE super flyweight contender Jin Mandokoro at RISE 132 on May 19, 2019. Tamaru won the fight by unanimous decision, with two scorecards of 49–48 and one scorecard of 50–48.

Following his first successful title defense, Tamaru faced the reigning RISE Bantamweight champion Masahiko Suzuki in a non-title bout at Rise World Series 2019 Final Round on September 16, 2019. Tamaru's ten fight winning streak came to an end, as Suzuki won the fight by an extra round decision.

Tamaru faced Masaking in another non-title bout at Rise on Abema on July 12, 2020. Tamaru won the fight by unanimous decision, with all three judges scoring the fight 30–28 in his favor.

Tamaru was booked to make his second title defense against Kazuki Osaki at RISE 142 on September 4, 2020. Osaki won the fight by unanimous decision, with scores of 49–47, 49–47 and 50–47.

==== RISE Dead or Alive tournament ====
Tamaru was booked to fight Jin Mandokoro in the quarterfinals of the 2021 RISE Dead or Alive 53 kg Tournament. The two of them previously faced each other on May 19, 2019, with Tamaru winning by unanimous decision. He lost the rematch by unanimous decision, with scores of 30–27, 30–27 and 30–28.

=== RISE Flyweight champion ===
==== Title reign ====
Tamaru was booked to face Kuryu at RISE 157 on April 24, 2022, in the semifinals of the 2022 RISE flyweight tournament, which was held to crown the inaugural RISE flyweight champion. The fight ended in a no contest in the first round due to doctor stoppage following a head clash in which Tamaru got his nose broken. The bout was rescheduled for RISE 161, which took place on August 28, 2022, but was postponed on August 17, as Kuryu withdrew after contracting COVID-19. The bout was later scrapped and Tamaru was instead booked to face Riku Kazushima for the inaugural RISE Flyweight (-51.5 kg) title at RISE 162 on October 30, 2022. Tamaru captured the title by unanimous decision, with all three judges scoring the bout 49–48 in his favor.

Tamaru faced Khunsueknoi Boomdeksian at RISE 164 on January 28, 2023, in his return to the super flyweight division. He won the fight by majority decision, with scores of 30–29, 29–29 and 30–28.

==== RISE World Series ====
Tamaru faced Kazane Nagai in a -54 kg catchweight bout, which served as a qualifier for the 2023 RISE World Series, at RISE EL DORADO 2023 on March 26, 2023. He won the fight by unanimous decision, with scores of 30–29, 30–29 and 30–28.

Tamaru faced Petchsila Wor.Auracha in the quarterfinals of the 2023 RISE -54 kg World Series at RISE World Series 2023 - 1st Round on July 2, 2023. He won the fight by a first-round knockout. Tamaru dropped Petchsilla to the canvas with a well-place knee to the liver, which left the Thai fighter unable to beat the count with three seconds to spare in the opening round. Tamaru advanced to the tournament semifinals, held on August 26, where he faced the RISE Super Flyweight champion Kazuki Osaki. He won the fight by majority decision, with scores of 30–28, 29–29 and 30–29.

Tamaru vacated the RISE Flyweight (-51.5 kg) Championship on September 14, 2023, in order to move up in weight. Tamaru faced Kumandoi Petchyindee Academy in the World Series final at RISE World Series 2023 - Final Round on December 16, 2023. He won the fight by unanimous decision.

=== Super flyweight and bantamweight ===
Tamaru challenged the RISE Bantamweight (-55kg) World champion Shiro at RISE ELDORADO 2024 on March 17, 2024. The fight ended in a no-contest, as an accidental clash of heads left Shiro unable to continue competing.

Tamaru faced Hyeonwoo Jung at RISE WORLD SERIES 2024 OSAKA on June 15, 2024. He won the fight by knockout less than one minute into the fight.

Tamaru challenged the RISE Bantamweight (-55kg) World champion Shiro for the second time at RISE WORLD SERIES 2024 YOKOHAMA on September 8, 2024. He lost the fight by unanimous decision.

== Titles and accomplishments ==
=== Professional ===
- RISE
  - 2018 RISE Super Flyweight (-53 kg) Championship (One defense)
  - 2022 RISE Flyweight (-51.5 kg) Championship
  - 2023 RISE -54 kg World Series Tournament Winner
  - 2023 RISE "Fighter of the Year"

=== Amateur ===
- Martial Arts Japan Kickboxing Federation
  - 2012 MA Jr. Kick -28 kg Champion
- BigBang
  - 2012 Bigbang -28 kg Champion
  - 2012 Bigbang -31 kg Champion
  - 2013 Bigbang -34 kg Champion
  - 2013 Bigbang -37 kg Tournament Champion
  - 2014 Bigbang -37 kg Champion
  - 2014 Bigbang -40 kg Champion
  - 2015 BigBang -50 kg Champion
  - 2016 Bigbang -55 kg Champion
- Shootboxing
  - 2014 Shootboxing All Japan Junior -45 kg Champion
- RISE
  - 2015 KAMINARIMON All Japan Junior -55 kg Champion
- J-NETWORK
  - 2016 J-NETWORK Bantamweight Tournament Champion
- K-1
  - 2016 K-1 All Japan A-Class -55 kg Champion

=== Awards ===
- Combat Press
  - 2023 Kickboxing Awards Fighter Of The Year
- efight
  - efight "Fighter of the Month" (December 2023)

== Mixed martial arts record ==
Professional record breakdown
1 match	0 wins	1 loss
By decision	0	1

Res.	Record	Opponent	Method	Event	Date	Round	Time	Location	Notes
Loss	0–1	Joe Hiramoto	Decision (unanimous)	Rizin: Otoko Matsuri	May 4, 2025	3	5:00	Tokyo, Japan	Flyweight debut.

== Kickboxing record ==
Professional Kickboxing record
19 Wins (4 (T)KO's), 5 Losses, 0 Draw, 2 No Contest
Date	Result	Opponent	Event	Location	Method	Round	Time
2026-10-17	Loss	(Japan) Shoma Okumura	ONE Samurai 4	Tokyo, Japan	Decision (unanimous)	3	3:00
2026-04-29	Win	(Japan) Toma Kuroda	ONE Samurai 1	Tokyo, Japan	Decision (unanimous)	3	3:00
2024-09-08	Loss	(Japan) Shiro	RISE WORLD SERIES 2024 YOKOHAMA	Yokohama, Japan	Decision (unanimous)	5	3:00
For the RISE Bantamweight (-55kg) World title.
2024-06-15	Win	(South Korea) Hyeonwoo Jung	RISE WORLD SERIES 2024 OSAKA	Osaka, Japan	KO (body kick)	1	0:36
2024-03-17	NC	(Japan) Shiro	RISE ELDORADO 2024	Tokyo, Japan	Doctor stop. (head clash)	1	3:00
For the RISE Bantamweight (-55kg) World title.
2023-12-16	Win	(Thailand) Kumandoi Petchyindee Academy	RISE World Series 2023 - Final Round	Tokyo, Japan	Decision (unanimous)	3	3:00
Wins the 2023 RISE -54kg World Series.
2023-08-26	Win	(Japan) Kazuki Osaki	RISE World Series 2023 - 2nd Round	Tokyo, Japan	Decision (majority)	3	3:00
2023-07-02	Win	(Thailand) Petchsila Wor.Auracha	RISE World Series 2023 - 1st Round	Osaka, Japan	KO (knee to the body)	1	2:57
2023-03-26	Win	(Japan) Kazane	RISE EL DORADO 2023	Tokyo, Japan	Decision (unanimous)	3	3:00
Qualifies for the 2023 RISE -54kg World Series.
2023-01-28	Win	(Thailand) Khunsueknoi Boomdeksian	RISE 164	Tokyo, Japan	Decision (majority)	3	3:00
2022-10-30	Win	(Japan) Riku Kazushima	RISE 162	Tokyo, Japan	Decision (unanimous)	5	3:00
Wins the inaugural RISE Flyweight (-51.5 kg) title.
2022-04-24	NC	(Japan) Ryuta Suekuni	RISE 157 - Flyweight Championship Tournament, Semi Final	Tokyo, Japan	Doctor stoppage (head clash)	1	
2021-07-18	Loss	(Japan) Jin Mandokoro	RISE WORLD SERIES 2021 - Dead or Alive Tournament, Quarter Final	Osaka, Japan	Decision (unanimous)	3	3:00
2020-09-04	Loss	(Japan) Kazuki Osaki	RISE 142	Tokyo, Japan	Decision (Unanimous)	5	3:00
Loses the RISE Super Flyweight (-53 kg) title.
2020-07-12	Win	(Japan) Masaking	Rise on Abema	Tokyo, Japan	Decision (unanimous)	3	3:00
2019-09-16	Loss	(Japan) Masahiko Suzuki	Rise World Series 2019 Final Round	Chiba, Japan	Ext.R Decision (unanimous)	4	3:00
2019-05-19	Win	(Japan) Jin Mandokoro	RISE 132	Tokyo, Japan	Decision (unanimous)	5	3:00
Defends the RISE Super Flyweight (-53 kg) title.
2019-02-03	Win	(Japan) Kazuki	RISE 130	Tokyo, Japan	KO (left straight)	1	1:56
2018-11-02	Win	(Japan) Azusa Kaneko	RISE 128	Tokyo, Japan	Decision (unanimous)	5	3:00
Wins the inaugural RISE Super Flyweight (-53 kg) title.
2018-09-16	Win	(Japan) Yuya Hayashi	RISE 127	Tokyo, Japan	Decision (unanimous)	3	3:00
2018-07-16	Win	(Japan) KING Takeshi	RISE 126	Tokyo, Japan	Decision (unanimous)	3	3:00
2018-05-25	Win	(Japan) Shota Toyama	RISE 124	Tokyo, Japan	Decision (unanimous)	3	3:00
2018-02-18	Win	(Japan) Kiyoshi	BigBang 32	Tokyo, Japan	Decision (unanimous)	3	3:00
2017-12-03	Win	(Japan) Shuto Hagiwara	BigBang 31	Tokyo, Japan	Decision (unanimous)	3	3:00
2017-09-03	Win	(Japan) Keiichi Iio	BigBang 30	Tokyo, Japan	KO	3	2:20
Legend: Win Loss Draw/No contest Notes

=== Amateur record ===
Amateur Kickboxing Record
around 80 Wins, 20 Losses, 5 Draws
Date	Result	Opponent	Event	Location	Method	Round	Time
2017-07-29	Loss	(Japan) Tatsuya Tsubakihara	K-1 Koshien 2017 –55 kg Tournament, Semi Final	Tokyo, Japan	Ext.R Decision (majority)	2	2:00
2017-07-29	Win	(Japan) Teruku Maezono	K-1 Koshien 2017 –55 kg Tournament, Quarter Final	Tokyo, Japan	Decision (majority)	1	2:00
2017-07-29	Win	(Japan) Kaito Nagashima	K-1 Koshien 2017 –55 kg Tournament, Second Round	Tokyo, Japan	Decision (unanimous)	1	2:00
2017-04-29	Loss	(Japan) Haruki Ohno	K-1 Challenge A-Class -55 kg Tournament, Final	Tokyo, Japan	Decision (unanimous)	1	2:00
2017-04-29	Win	(Japan) Riamu Sera	K-1 Challenge A-Class -55 kg Tournament, Semi Final	Tokyo, Japan	Decision (unanimous)	1	2:00
2016-12-11	Win	(Japan) Tetsuji Noda	K-1 Amateur Challenge A-Class -55 kg Tournament, Final	Tokyo, Japan	Decision (unanimous)	3	2:00
Wins K-1 All Japan Amateur A-class -55kg title.
2016-12-11	Win	(Japan) Retsu Akabane	K-1 Amateur Challenge A-Class -55 kg Tournament, Semi Final	Tokyo, Japan	Decision (unanimous)	2	2:00
2016-10-23	Loss	(Japan) Tetsuji Noda	K-1 Amateur All Japan Preliminary Tournament, Semi Final	Tokyo, Japan	Decision (unanimous)	1	2:00
2016-10-23	Win	(Japan) Hiroki Nishimura	K-1 Amateur All Japan Preliminary Tournament, Quarter Final	Tokyo, Japan	Decision (unanimous)	1	2:00
2016-09-04	Win	(Japan) Ryusei Iwagawa	BigBang 26	Tokyo, Japan	Decision	3	2:00
Defends the BigBang Amateur -55kg title.
2016-06-28	Win	(Japan)	BigBang	Tokyo, Japan	Decision	3	2:00
Defends the BigBang Amateur -55kg title.
2016-05-29	Win	(Japan) Fuminori Muroki	J-Network J-GROW in SHINJUKU～vol.5, -53 kg Tournament, Final	Japan	KO (punches)		0:21
Wins J-Network Amateur Bantamweight Tournament title.
2016-05-29	Win	(Japan) Kaito Nagashima	J-Network J-GROW in SHINJUKU～vol.5, -53 kg Tournament, Semi Final	Japan	KO		2:43
2016-05-29	Win	(Japan) Yuya Hayashi	J-Network J-GROW in SHINJUKU～vol.5, -53 kg Tournament, Quarter Final	Japan	Decision (unanimous)	1	2:00
2016-02-21	Win	(Japan) Michitaka Yamaguchi	BigBang 24	Tokyo, Japan	Decision	3	2:00
Wins the BigBang Amateur -55kg title.
2015-12-06	Win	(Japan) Jukiya Ito	Bigbang Amateur	Tokyo, Japan	Decision	2	1:30
2015-11-15	Draw	(Japan) Ikko Ota	Bigbang the future 15	Tokyo, Japan	Decision	3	1:30
Defends the BigBang Amateur -50kg title.
2015-09-20	Win	(Japan) Hayato Mizoguchi	KAMINARIMON All Japan, Final	Tokyo, Japan	Decision (unanimous)	2	2:00
Wins Kaminarimon All Japan Junior -55kg title.
2015-09-20	Win	(Japan) Ruka Hosoda	KAMINARIMON All Japan, Semi Final	Tokyo, Japan	Decision (unanimous)	2	2:00
2015-09-06	Win	(Japan) Shinnosuke Hatsuda	BigBang Amateur	Tokyo, Japan	Decision	3	1:30
Wins the BigBang Amateur -50kg title.
2015-04-29	Loss	(Japan) Ikko Ota	NJKF EXPLOSION 1	Tokyo, Japan	Decision	2	1:30
2015-02-22	Loss	(Japan) Haruto Yasumoto	All Japan Jr. Kick Kanto Selection Tournament, Fnal	Tokyo, Japan	Decision	3	1:30
2015-02-15	Win	(Japan) Ikko Ota	BigBang	Tokyo, Japan	Decision	2	2:00
2014-12-23	Win	(Japan) Tomoki Miyashita	Amateur REBELS BLOW-CUP.34, Final	Tokyo, Japan	Decision (majority)		
2014-12-21	Win	(Japan) Kyo Kawakami	Amateur Shootboxing	Tokyo, Japan	Decision (unanimous)	2	2:00
Wins Amateur Shoot Boxing All Japan -45kg title
2014-12-14	Loss	(Japan) Ikko Ota	BOM Amateur 8	Yokohama, Japan	Decision	3	2:00
2014-10-19	Loss	(Japan) Ryutaro Uchida	K-1 Challenge 2014, Junior B-Class Tournament Final	Tokyo, Japan	Decision (unanimous)	2	2:00
2014-10-19	Win	(Japan) Daiki Mine	K-1 Challenge 2014, Junior B-Class Tournament Semi Final	Tokyo, Japan	Decision (majority)	1	2:00
2014-09-07	Win	(Japan) Jukiya Ito	Bigbang Amateur 23	Tokyo, Japan	Decision	3	1:30
Wins Bigbang Amateur -40kg title.
2014-06-29	Loss	(Japan) Ryutaro Uchida	Muay Thai WINDY Super Fight vol.16, Quarter Final	Tokyo, Japan	Decision		
2014-06-01	Loss	(Japan) Ryutaro Uchida	BigBang Amateur 21	Tokyo, Japan	Decision	3	2:00
For the BigBang Amateur -40kg title.
2014-05-06	Loss	(Japan) Haruto Yasumoto	BOM Amateur 6, -40 kg Championship Tournament Final	Tokyo, Japan	Decision	2	2:00
For the BOM Amateur -40kg title.
2014-05-06	Win	(Japan) Taison Suzuki	BOM Amateur 6, -40 kg Championship Tournament Semi Final	Tokyo, Japan	Decision	2	2:00
2014-05-06	Win	(Japan) Michiharu Nara	BOM Amateur 6, -40 kg Championship Tournament Quarter Final	Tokyo, Japan	Decision	2	2:00
2014-04-13	Win	(Japan) Tatsu Nagai	BOM Amateur 5	Tokyo, Japan	Decision	2	2:00
2014-03-23	Win	(Japan) Shinnosuke Yamada	JAKF SMASHERS 163	Tokyo, Japan	KO	2	
2014-03-16	Loss	(Japan) Haruto Yasumoto	REBELS.25	Tokyo, Japan	Decision	2	2:00
2014-02-23	Win	(Japan) Riichi Hosono	Bigbang Amateur 19	Tokyo, Japan	Decision	3	2:00
Wins Bigbang Amateur -37kg title.
2014-01-19	Win	(Japan) Shogo Nakajima	BOM Battle of Muay Thai Amateur 4	Tokyo, Japan	Decision	2	2:00
2014-01-19	Win	(Japan) Tatsumi Nagai	BOM Battle of Muay Thai Amateur 4	Tokyo, Japan	Decision	2	2:00
2013-12-01	Loss	(Japan) Ryutaro Uchida	BigBang Amateur 18	Tokyo, Japan	Decision	3	2:00
For Bigbang Amateur -37kg title.
2013-11-04	Win	(Japan) Ayano Ohara	Windy Super Fight vol.15	Tokyo, Japan	Decision	2	2:00
2013-10-13	Win	(Japan) Riichi Hoshino	BigBang Amateur 17, Final	Tokyo, Japan	Decision	3	2:00
Wins the BigBang Amateur Tournament -37kg title.
2013-10-13	Win	(Japan)	BigBang Amateur 17, Semi Final	Tokyo, Japan	Decision	2	2:00
2013-09-08	Loss	(Japan) Yuuta Sasaki	BOM Battle of Muay Thai Amateur 2	Tokyo, Japan	Decision	2	2:00
2013-09-01	Win	(Japan) Hyuga Ishibe	BigBang 14	Tokyo, Japan	Decision	2	2:00
2013-07-14	Loss	(Japan) Ryu Kanno	BigBang Amateur 15	Tokyo, Japan	Decision	3	2:00
Loses the BigBang Amateur -34kg title.
2013-06-02	Win	(Japan) Reiji Nakamura	BigBang Amateur 14	Tokyo, Japan	KO		
2013-05-12	Win	(Japan) Kojiro Vanhoose	BOM Battle of Muay Thai Amateur, Final	Tokyo, Japan	Decision	2	2:00
2013-05-12	Win	(Japan) Asahi Shinagawa	BOM Battle of Muay Thai Amateur, Semi Final	Tokyo, Japan	Decision	2	2:00
2013-05-12	Win	(Japan) Ryu Kanno	BOM Battle of Muay Thai Amateur, Quarter Final	Tokyo, Japan	Decision	2	2:00
2013-05-05	Win	(Japan) Ikko Oota	Bigbang the future VI	Tokyo, Japan	Decision	3	2:00
Defends Bigbang Amateur -34kg title.
2013-04-07	Win	(Japan) Hyoga	REBELS Blow Cup 15	Tokyo, Japan	Decision	2	2:00
2013-03-17	Loss	(Japan) Haruto Yasumoto	MA Kick BREAK-35	Tokyo, Japan	Decision	3	1:30
For the MA Kick Jr -32kg title.
2013-03-10	Win	(Japan) Ryuya Koyama	Bigbang the future VI	Tokyo, Japan	Decision	3	2:00
Wins Bigbang Amateur -34kg title.
2013	Win	(Japan) Arai	TNT Amateur YZD Gym	Tokyo, Japan	Decision		
2013	Draw	(Japan) Nadaka Yoshinari	TNT Amateur YZD Gym	Tokyo, Japan	Decision		
2012-12-23	Win	(Japan) Hyoga Okada	REBELS Blow Cup 12	Tokyo, Japan	Decision	2	2:00
2012-11-11	Win	(Japan) Jukiya Ito	Jawin presents Bigbang the future V	Tokyo, Japan	Decision		
Wins Bigbang Amateur -31kg title.
2012-10-28	Win	(Japan) Hyoga Okada	REBELS	Tokyo, Japan	Decision	2	2:00
2012-10-21	Loss	(Japan) Takito	M-1 Muay Thai Amateur 54, Semi Final	Tokyo, Japan	Decision		
2012-08-26	Win	(Japan) Ryuya Okuwaki	MA Japan Kickboxing Break 28	Tokyo, Japan	Decision	3	1:30
Wins the MA Kick Jr. -28kg title.
2012-07-16	Win	(Japan) Hibiki Sometani	BigBang	Tokyo, Japan	Decision	2	1:30
2012-07-01	Win	(Japan) Yumu Ito	REBELS Blow Cup 7	Tokyo, Japan	Decision	2	1:30
2012-06-03	Loss	(Japan) Ikko Ota	BigBang Amateur Event	Tokyo, Japan	Decision	2	1:30
Legend: Win Loss Draw/No contest Notes

== See also ==
- List of male kickboxers
