= Kazane Nagai =

Japanese kickboxer

Kazane
- Born: Kazane Nagai; October 27, 1998 (age 27); Uji, Japan
- Native name: 永井風音
- Nationality: Japanese
- Height: 1.67 m (5 ft 5 1/2 in)
- Weight: 53 kg (117 lb; 8.3 st)
- Division: Strawweight
- Style: Kickboxing
- Stance: Orthodox
- Fighting out of: Tokyo, Japan
- Team: RealStyle; N SPIRITS GYM TEAM (2015); Kyoto Juku (2016-2018); Team Teppen (2019-2022)
- Years active: 2015–2022

Kickboxing record
- Total: 26
- Wins: 17
- By knockout: 6
- Losses: 9
- By knockout: 0

Kazane (風音, Kazane; born October 27, 1998) is a retired Japanese kickboxer, who fought professionally in RISE. He was the 2021 RISE Dead of Alive Super Flyweight (-53 kg) Tournament winner and was a one-time RISE Super Flyweight (-53kg) title challenger.

As of October 2021 he was the #2 ranked strawweight kickboxer in the world by Combat Press.

== Kickboxing career ==
=== DEEP KICK ===
Kazane made his professional debut in the DEEP KICK Freshman Tournament, held at DEEP☆KICK 25 on May 24, 2015. He was scheduled to face Kyosuke Nishida in a two-round semifinal bout. Kazane won the fight by unanimous decision, with scores of 20–19, 20–19 and 20–18. Advancing to the finals, Kazane faced Yuto Kuroda in a three-round, three minute bout. He once again won by unanimous decision, with all three judges scoring the fight 30–27 in his favor.

Kazane was scheduled to face Ryota Naito at DEEP☆KICK 27 on September 21, 2015. Following a relatively even first round, Naito scored a knockdown with a head kick in the second round. Although he was unable to finish Kazane, Naito won the fight by unanimous decision, with scores of 29–27, 29–27 and 30–28.

Kazane was scheduled to face Takasuke Sekimoto at DEEP☆KICK 28 on December 23, 2015. Kazane won the fight by a second-round technical knockout, finishing Sekimoto with punches after knocking him down with a knee strike.

=== HOOST CUP ===
Kazane was scheduled to make his promotional debut with HOOST CUP against Koudai Hirayama at HOOST CUP KINGS OSAKA on October 2, 2016. He suffered his second professional loss by unanimous decision. Following this loss, Kazane was scheduled to face Kai Hasegawa at HOOST CUP KINGS Kyoto 2 on March 5, 2017. He won the fight by a first-round knockout. He won his next fight against Kyosuke at HOOST CUP KINGS Kyoto 3 on July 9, 2017, by a third-round technical knockout, winning two consecutive fights for the first time since his professional debut.

Kazane was scheduled to face Koki Osaki at HOOST CUP KINGS NAGOYA 3 on September 30, 2017. Osaki won the fight by unanimous decision, snapping Kazane's two fight streak, with all three judges scoring the fight 30–25. Kazane was knocked down twice in the fight, in the first and third rounds, both times with a right straight.

Kazane was scheduled to fight a rematch with Kyosuke at HOOST CUP KINGS OSAKA 2 on November 26, 2017. He won the closely contested fight by majority decision, with scores of 29–29, 30–29 and 30–29.

Kazane was scheduled to face King Takeshi at HOOST CUP KINGS KYOTO 4 on February 25, 2018. He lost the fight by unanimous decision, with scores of 29–28, 30–28 and 30–27.

Kazane returned to DEEP KICK for his next fight, following a three-year absence from the promotion. He was scheduled to face Hiroki Matsuoka at DEEP☆KICK 36 on July 1, 2018. Kazane scored the singular knockdown of the fight with a head kick in the first round. He won the fight by unanimous decision, with scores of 29–28, 29–28 and 30–27.

=== RISE ===
In March 2019, Kazane signed with RISE and moved to the Team Teppen gym. He was scheduled to make his promotional debut against Yusei Murai at RISE 131 on March 23, 2019. Kazane won the fight by a second-round knockout.

Kazane was scheduled to face Hiroki Matsuoka at RISE EVOL.4 on June 14, 2019. He won the fight by unanimous decision, with scores of 30–28, 30–29 and 30–28.

Kazane was scheduled to face Reiya at RISE 134 on September 29, 2019. He won the fight by a second-round technical knockout, successfully knocking Reiya down three times in under two minutes.

Kazane was scheduled to face Kiri Matsutani at RISE 135 on November 4, 2019. As the fight was ruled a draw following the first three rounds, the two of them fought an additional round, after which Kazane was awarded a unanimous decision.

Kazane's five-fight winning streak was snapped by Kazuki Osaki at RISE 137 on February 23, 2020. Osaki knocked Kazane twice during the bout and won the bout by unanimous decision. Two of the judges scored the fight 29–27 for Osaki, while the third judge scored all three rounds in his favor. Kazane suffered an injury during this fight, which sidelined him for the rest of the year.

Kazane was scheduled to face Hiroyuki at RISE 146 on February 23, 2021. He won the fight by unanimous decision, with all three judges scoring the fight 30–28.

==== RISE World Series ====
Kazane participated in the 2021 RISE World Series 53 kg tournament. He was scheduled to fight the three-time Rajadamnern Stadium title challenger Mutsuki Ebata in the tournament quarterfinals, held on July 18, 2021. Although he came into the fight as the underdog, Kazane won the fight by split decision. The fight was ruled a majority draw after the first three rounds, with two judges scoring the fight 29–29 and 30–30, while the third judge scored the fight 30–29 for Kazane. Kazane was awarded the decision after an extra round was fought, with two judges giving him the nod.

Kazane was scheduled to face Jin Mandokoro in the tournament semifinals, held on September 23, 2021. Mandokoro advanced to the semifinals with a unanimous decision win against Toki Tamaru in the quarterfinals. He won the closely contested fight by majority decision, with two judges scoring the fight 30-29 in his favor, while the third judge scored it as a 29-29 draw. Kazane faced the 2020 Rise Dead or Alive Super Bantamweight tournament winner Shiro in the finals. The fight was ruled a majority draw after the first three rounds, with two judges scoring it as a 29-29 and 30-30 draw respectively, while the third judge scored it as 30-29 for Kazane. Kazane was awarded the unanimous decision after an extra round was fought. During the post-fight interview, he stated his desire to fight his teammate Tenshin Nasukawa in his next fight.

==== Kazane vs. Tenshin ====
Kazane was booked to face the former two-weight RISE champion Tenshin Nasukawa at Rise El Dorado 2022 on April 2, 2022, in what was Nasukawa's last fight with the promotion. Nasukawa was considered one of the best pound for pound kickboxer in the world at the time of the bout's scheduling. Kazane lost the closely contested bout by majority decision. Two of the judges scored the fight 30–29 for Nasukawa, while the third judge scored the fight an even 29–29.

==== Continued bantamweight career ====
Kazane faced the 2021 K-1 Japan Grand Prix winner Toma Kuroda at The Match 2022, the K-1 and RISE cross-promotional event, on June 19, 2022. The fight was ruled a split decision draw following the first three rounds, with one judge scored the bout an even 30–30, while the remaining two judges awarded a 30–29 scorecard to Kazane and Kuroda respectively. Kazane was awarded a unanimous decision victory after an extra fourth round was contested.

Kazane challenged Kazuki Osaki for the RISE Super Flyweight (-53 kg) Championship at RISE Word Series 2022 on October 15, 2022. Osaki was at the time regarded as the best kickboxer under 54 kg and one of the best pound for pound fighters in the world. Kazane lost the fight by a close majority decision, with scores of 50–49, 48–48 and 49–48.

Kazane faced the RISE Flyweight (-51.5 kg) champion Toki Tamaru at RISE EL DORADO 2023 on March 26, 2023. The bout was contested at a -54 kg catchweight and served as a qualifier for the 2023 RISE World Series. He lost the fight by unanimous decision, with two scorecards of 30–29 and one scorecard of 30–28.

Kazane faced Jin Mandokoro at RISE World Series 2023 - 1st Round on July 2, 2023, in a -54 kg World Series reserve fight. The bout was a rematch of their September 23, 2021, bout which Kazane won by majority decision. He lost the fight by an extra-round split decision.

Kazane announced his retirement from competition on October 25, 2023.

== Championships and accomplishments ==
Amateur

- 2012 Kyoken Junior Kick Jr. Middleweight Champion

Professional

- DEEP KICK
  - 2015 DEEP☆KICK -53 kg Freshman Tournament Winner
- RISE
  - 2021 RISE -53 kg Dead or Alive Tournament Winner

== Fight record ==
Professional Kickboxing Record
17 Wins (6 (T)KO's), 9 Losses, 0 Draw, 0 No Contest
Date	Result	Opponent	Event	Location	Method	Round	Time
2023-07-02	Loss	(Japan) Jin Mandokoro	RISE World Series 2023 - 1st Round - Tournament reserve fight	Osaka, Japan	Ext.R Decision (Split)	4	3:00
2023-03-26	Loss	(Japan) Toki Tamaru	RISE ELDORADO 2023	Tokyo, Japan	Decision (Unanimous)	3	3:00
Fails to qualify for the 2023 RISE -54kg World Series Tournament.
2022-10-15	Loss	(Japan) Kazuki Osaki	RISE WORLD SERIES 2022	Tokyo, Japan	Decision (Majority)	5	3:00
For the RISE Super Flyweight (-53kg) title.
2022-06-19	Win	(Japan) Toma Kuroda	THE MATCH 2022	Tokyo, Japan	Ext.R Decision (Unanimous)	4	3:00
2022-04-02	Loss	(Japan) Tenshin Nasukawa	RISE El Dorado 2022	Tokyo, Japan	Decision (Majority)	3	3:00
2021-09-23	Win	(Japan) Shiro	RISE WORLD SERIES 2021 Yokohama – Dead or Alive Tournament, Final	Yokohama, Japan	Ext.R Decision (Unanimous)	4	3:00
Wins the RISE -53kg Dead or Alive Tournament title.
2021-09-23	Win	(Japan) Jin Mandokoro	RISE WORLD SERIES 2021 Yokohama – Dead or Alive Tournament, Semi Final	Yokohama, Japan	Decision (Majority)	3	3:00
2021-07-18	Win	(Japan) Mutsuki Ebata	RISE WORLD SERIES 2021 Osaka – Dead or Alive Tournament, Quarter Final	Osaka, Japan	Ext.R Decision (Split)	4	3:00
2021-02-23	Win	(Japan) Hiroyuki	RISE 146	Tokyo, Japan	Decision (Unanimous)	3	3:00
2020-02-23	Loss	(Japan) Kazuki Osaki	RISE 137	Tokyo, Japan	Decision (Unanimous)	3	3:00
2019-11-04	Win	(Japan) Kiri Matsutani	RISE 135	Tokyo, Japan	Ext.R Decision (Unanimous)	4	3:00
2019-09-29	Win	(Japan) Reiya	RISE 134	Tokyo, Japan	TKO (3 Knockdowns)	2	1:52
2019-06-14	Win	(Japan) Hiroki Matsuoka	RISE EVOL.4	Tokyo, Japan	Decision (Unanimous)	3	3:00
2019-03-23	Win	(Japan) Yusei Murai	RISE 131	Tokyo, Japan	KO (Punches)	2	2:06
2018-07-01	Win	(Japan) Hiroki Matsuoka	DEEP☆KICK 36	Osaka, Japan	Decision (Unanimous)	3	3:00
2018-02-25	Loss	(Japan) King Takeshi	HOOST CUP KINGS KYOTO 4	Kyoto, Japan	Decision (Unanimous)	3	3:00
2017-11-26	Win	(Japan) Kyosuke	HOOST CUP KINGS OSAKA 2	Osaka, Japan	Decision (Majority)	3	3:00
2017-09-30	Loss	(Japan) Koki Osaki	HOOST CUP KINGS NAGOYA 3	Nagoya, Japan	Decision (Unanimous)	3	3:00
2017-07-09	Win	(Japan) Kyosuke	HOOST CUP KINGS Kyoto 3	Kyoto, Japan	TKO (Punches)	3	2:19
2017-03-05	Win	(Japan) Kai Hasegawa	HOOST CUP KINGS Kyoto 2	Kyoto, Japan	TKO (Right Cross)	1	
2016-10-02	Loss	(Japan) Koudai	HOOST CUP KINGS OSAKA	Osaka, Japan	Decision (Unanimous)	3	3:00
2015-12-23	Win	(Japan) Takasuke Sekimoto	DEEP☆KICK 28	Osaka, Japan	TKO (Punches)	2	2:24
2015-09-21	Loss	(Japan) Ryota Naito	DEEP☆KICK 27	Osaka, Japan	Decision (Unanimous)	3	3:00
2015-05-24	Win	(Japan) Yuto Kuroda	DEEP☆KICK 25, Freshman Tournament Final	Osaka, Japan	Decision (Unanimous)	3	3:00
Wins the DEEP☆KICK -53kg Freshman Tournament title.
2015-05-24	Win	(Japan) Kyosuke Nishida	DEEP☆KICK 25, Freshman Tournament Semi Final	Osaka, Japan	Decision (Unanimous)	2	3:00
Legend: Win Loss Draw/No contest Notes

=== Amateur record ===
Amateur Kickboxing record
Date	Result	Opponent	Event	Location	Method	Round	Time
2015-04-26	Win	(Japan) Kaito Yamawaki	NEXT☆LEVEL Kansai 22	Sakai, Japan	Decision (Unanimous)	2	2:00
2014-09-21	Loss	(Japan) Shori Morishita	Crazy King vol.6	Kobe, Japan	Decision	3	3:00
2014-06-29	Win	(Japan) Yutaka Iwakura	ALL BOX WORLD 4th	Osaka, Japan	KO	2	
2013-07-07	Win	(Japan) Kazuya Oohara	Kyoken Junior Kick 9	Osaka, Japan	Decision (Unanimous)	2	2:00
2013-05-26	Draw	(Japan) Begin Yoshioka	GLADIATOR 56	Osaka, Japan	Decision	2	2:00
2013-05-12	Win	(Japan) Ryo Takahata	Kyoken Junior Kick 8	Osaka, Japan	Decision (Unanimous)	2	2:00
2013-01-20	Loss	(Japan) Taiga Imanaga	Kyoken Junior Kick 6, Quarter Final	Osaka, Japan	Decision	2	2:00
2012-12-05	Win	(Japan) Masao Mihara	RKS Amateur 5	Osaka, Japan	Decision	2	2:00
2012-11-18	Loss	(Japan) Taiga Imanaga	Kyoken Junior Kick, Semi Final	Osaka, Japan	Decision	2	2:00
2012-11-18	Win	(Japan) Hiroto Ichimura	Kyoken Junior Kick, Quarter Final	Osaka, Japan	Decision	2	2:00
2012-11-18	Loss	(Japan) Ryo Tokunaga	Kyoken Junior Kick, First Round	Osaka, Japan	Decision	2	2:00
2012-09-02	Win	(Japan) Kakyo Sakai	Kyoken Junior Kick, Final	Osaka, Japan	Decision (Majority)	2	1:30
Wins Kyoken Junior Kick Jr. Middleweight title.
2012-09-02	Win	(Japan) Shoki Kaneda	Kyoken Junior Kick, Semi Final	Osaka, Japan	Decision	2	1:30
2012-09-23	Win	(Japan) Ryo Tokunaga	NEXT☆LEVEL Kansai 1	Sakai, Japan	Decision (Unanimous)	2	1:30
2012-07-15	Loss	(Japan) Kakyo Sakai	Kyoken Junior Kick 3	Osaka, Japan	Decision (Unanimous)	2	1:30
2012-07-15	Win	(Japan) Shoki Kaneda	Kyoken Junior Kick 3	Osaka, Japan	Decision (Unanimous)	2	1:30
Legend: Win Loss Draw/No contest Notes

== See also ==
- List of male kickboxers
