= Takashi Ito (kickboxer) =

Japanese former kickboxer

Takashi Itō
- Born: Itō Takashi; 22 September 1970 (age 56); Iruma, Saitama, Japan
- Native name: 伊藤 隆
- Nationality: (Japan) Japanese
- Height: 1.84 m (6 ft 1/2 in)
- Weight: 70 kg (150 lb; 11 st)
- Division: Welterweight
- Style: Kickboxing
- Stance: Southpaw
- Fighting out of: Setagaya, Tokyo, Japan
- Team: Yamaki Gym
- Years active: 1994–2001

Kickboxing record
- Total: 37
- Wins: 31
- By knockout: 21
- Losses: 5
- By knockout: ?
- Draws: 1
- No contests: 0

Other information
- Occupation: Representative of KGS; President of TARGET
- Website: Official website
- Last updated on: February 18, 2010

Takashi Itō (伊藤 隆, Itō Takashi; born September 22, 1970) is a Japanese former welterweight kickboxer fighting out of Yamaki Gym in Setagaya, Tokyo. He is the owner of kickboxing gym "TARGET", and the manager of the kickboxing promotion company "R.I.S.E.". He won the world title of WMAF at Junior middleweight. He is Christian.

== Biography ==
=== Early life ===
He was born in Saitama, Japan, September 22, 1970. He became a model, but he was halfhearted as he said in interview. For instance, although he had got drunk and had a hangover, he went to the audition.

When he was 20, he decided to attend a fitness club, but he thought it wasn't enough and then he started going to kickboxing gym which was near to his home. That was Yamaki Gym.

He debuted in Spring 1994 as "Ryuji Ibuki".

=== Winning Japanese Title ===
In December 1996, Ito challenged Hammer Matsui's Japanese welterweight title. He won by knockout at 4R, and won the title.

In July 1997, he fought against Koki Date to defend his title, but he lost by unanimous decision and lost his title. Date won the title but he had to return his title as he could not defend his title because his skull was caved when he fought against Ito and the doctor ordered not to fight for a year. For this reason, Ito could challenge the title in 2 months later after his loss.

In September, Ito had a championship for the vacant title of MAJKF Welterweight, and fought against Takashi Idemoto. Idemoto cut Ito's middle of forehead with elbow, but he could not open his wound because his stamina ran out. On the other hand, Ito continued to attack with knee and kicks. At the end of 5R, Ito won by unanimous decision, and won the same title again.

=== Winning World Title ===
In April 1998, he went to France to attend the world tournament of 67 kg class, fought against Jomhod Kiatadisak. He could not take a measure against Jomhod's neck wrestling, and he was knocked out by body shots with knee at 2R. When he was depressed just after the bout, Jomhod' second said him that "Jomhod said I was damaged as much as you were because I'm a human". When Ito heard this, he had confidence and stopped flinching from opponent's title and achievements.

In May, he fought against Luke Kenton (Australia/WMAF#2) for the vacant world title of WMAF at Junior middleweight. He won by majority decision at 5R.

In September, he fought against John Wayne Parr. He cut Parr's middle of the forehead by left elbow at 2R, and the doctor stopped the bout.

In March 2000, he fought against Sangtiennoi Sor.Rungroj (Thailand/WMAF#1)to defend his title. At 5R, Saengtiennoi's right shoulder was dislocated because of neck wrestling. He gave up to continue to fight, and Ito retained his title.

=== Retirement ===
In November, he got back in the K-1 ring to fight Takashi Ohno. He overwhelmed Ohno with punching and middle kicks, and Ohno managed to continue clinching. This was regarded as passive attitude by referee and he was taken off his points twice, and Ito went on to win by unanimous decision at 5R. Ito suffered a brain injury at the end of the year, and was told to stop fighting kickboxing, forcing him into retirement. For this reason, he had a retirement bout(Exhibition) with Masato on March 30, 2001. After the bout, he stated that he would continue to be involved in kickboxing. Looking back on his career, he said his best bout was vs. Saengtiennoi.

On February 23, 2003, he established a new kickboxing promotion company "KRS", and he started a continuous kickboxing series event "R.I.S.E." which means Real Impact Sports Entertainment.

== Kickboxing record ==
Kickboxing record
37 Fights, 31 wins (21 KOs), 5 Losses, 1 Draw
Date	Result	Opponent	Event	Location	Method	Round	Time
2001-03-30	Ex	(Japan) Masato	MAJKF "ODYSSEY-1 Ito Takashi Retirement Memorial Match"	Bunkyo, Tokyo, Japan	No Decision	1	2:00
Ito's retirement bout.(Exhibition)
2000-11-01	Win	(Japan) Takashi Ohno	K-1 J-MAX 2000	Bunkyo, Tokyo, Japan	Decision(unanimous)	5	3:00
2000-09-03	Win	(Russia) Ilin Vitali	MAJKF "COMBAT - 2000 King Road II"	Bunkyo, Tokyo, Japan	TKO	4	2:19
2000-07-20	Win	(South Korea) Jo-En Hor	MAJKF "COMBAT - 2000 King Road"	Bunkyo, Tokyo, Japan	KO (Left high kick)	3	2:08
2000-05-26	Win	(Thailand) Panomtuanlek Chorchanmuang	MAJKF "COMBAT-2000"	Bunkyo, Tokyo, Japan	TKO	1	0:28
2000-03-22	Win	(Thailand) Sangtiennoi Sor.Rungroj	MAJKF "COMBAT-2000"	Bunkyo, Tokyo, Japan	TKO (shoulder dislocation)	5	2:28
Retain WMAF Super welterweight Championship.(1)
1999-09-25	Loss	(Australia) Reece ToganeGym	MAJKF "Set Fire II - Set fire to kickboxing! -"	Bunkyo, Tokyo, Japan	Decision (Majority)	5	3:00
1998-09-19	Win	(Australia) John Wayne Parr	AJKF & MAJKF Joint Event	Bunkyo, Tokyo, Japan	TKO (Doctor stoppage)	2	2:47
1998-07-17	Win	(Japan) Soldier Ogata	MAJKF "Kick Guts" Kajiwara Ikki Cup	Bunkyo, Tokyo, Japan	Decision (Unanimous)	5	3:00
1998-06-26	Win	(Japan) Kenichi Nagata	MAJKF "Mach Shidokan Dream Match"	Bunkyo, Tokyo, Japan	KO (Knee)	3	3:08
1998-05-22	Win	(Australia) Luke Kenton	MAJKF "Champion Carnival"	Bunkyo, Tokyo, Japan	Decisoon (Majority)	5	3:00
Wins the vacant 1st WMAF Junior middleweight Championship.
1998-04	Lose	(Thailand) Jomhod Kiatadisak		France	KO (Knee to the body)	2	
1997-10-25	Win	(France) Morad Sari	MAJKF	Bunkyo, Tokyo, Japan	Decision (Split)	5	3:00
1997-09-23	Win	(Japan) Takashi Idemoto	MAJKF "World Championship"	Bunkyo, Tokyo, Japan	Decisoon (Unanimous)	5	3:00
Wins the vacant title of MAJKF Welterweight.
1997-07-26	Loss	(Japan) Koki Date	MAJKF	Bunkyo, Tokyo, Japan	Decision (Majority)	5	3:00
Loses MAJKF Welterweight title.
1997-05-23	Win	(Japan) Shinji Matsuura	MAJKF	Bunkyo, Tokyo, Japan	TKO		
1997-03-29	Win	(Japan) Ryuji Goto	MAJKF	Bunkyo, Tokyo, Japan	TKO		
1997-01-26	Win	(Japan) K Takahashi	MAJKF	Bunkyo, Tokyo, Japan	KO		
1996-12-01	Win	(Japan) Hannmer Matsui	MAJKF	Bunkyo, Tokyo, Japan	KO	4	2:20
Wins Matsui's MAJKF Welterweight title.
1996-05-	Loss	(Japan) Kenichi Ogata	MAJKF	Bunkyo, Tokyo, Japan	Decision	5	3:00
1995-03-23	Win	(Japan) Sumitomo	K-LEAGUE KENZAN	Tokyo, Japan	Decision (Unanimous)	3	3:00
Legend: Win Loss Draw/No contest Notes

== Titles ==
- The 1st WMAF Super welterweight Champion (Defence: 1)

== Awards ==
- 1998 MVP (MAJKF, December 26, 1998)
- 2000 MVP (MAJKF, January 27, 2001)

== Trivia ==
- His entrance music is Livin' La Vida Loca by Ricky Martin.
- His elder brother Tsutomu "David" Ito is an actor and a businessman.

== See also ==
- List of male kickboxers
