= Tenshin Nasukawa =

Japanese professional kickboxer

Tenshin Nasukawa 那須川天心
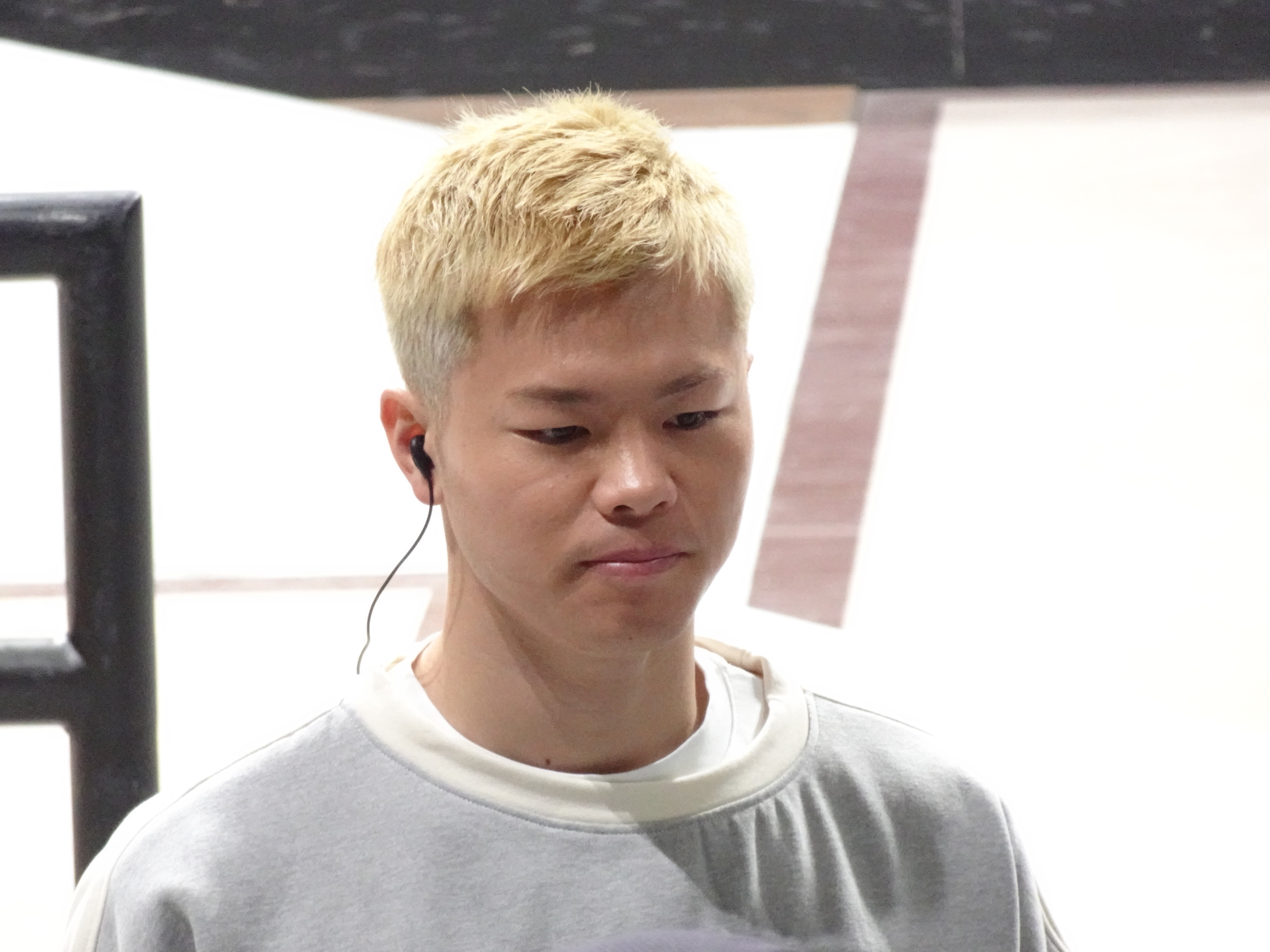
- Nasukawa at Skateboarding Street World Championship 2023 in Tokyo, Japan
- Born: August 18, 1998 (age 28); Matsudo, Chiba Prefecture, Japan
- Other names: Prodigy (神童); The strongest high schooler (最強高校生)
- Height: 165 cm (5 ft 5 in)
- Weight: 55.34 kg (122.0 lb; 8.7 st)
- Division: Flyweight (MMA); Bantamweight (Rise Kickboxing, -55 kg); Super Bantamweight, Boxing); Featherweight, Rizin Kickboxing)
- Reach: 176 cm (69 in)
- Style: Kyokushin Karate, Kickboxing, Boxing
- Team: Target (2012–2016, 2022); Team Teppen (2017–2021); Team Tenshin; Teiken Gym (2023–present)
- Trainer: Hiroyuki Nasukawa (father, Teppen Gym president), Takashi Ito (Target president), Yuji Okamoto (boxing coach), Yūichi Kasai (part-time boxing coach)
- Rank: Black belt in Kyokushin Kaikan

Professional boxing record
- Total: 10
- Wins: 8
- By knockout: 3
- Losses: 2

Kickboxing record
- Total: 42
- Wins: 42
- By knockout: 28
- Losses: 0

Mixed martial arts record
- Total: 4
- Wins: 4
- By knockout: 2
- By submission: 1
- By decision: 1
- Losses: 0

Amateur Kickboxing record
- Total: 107
- Wins: 99
- By knockout: 37
- Losses: 5
- Draws: 3

Other information
- Notable relatives: Ryujin Nasukawa (younger brother)
- Website: https://fc.teamtenshin.com/
- Boxing record from BoxRec
- Mixed martial arts record from Sherdog

Tenshin Nasukawa

YouTube information
- Channel: 那須川天心チャンネル
- Years active: 2020-present
- Genre: vlog
- Subscribers: 1 million
- Views: 185.40 million
- Last updated: 4 February 2023

Tenshin Nasukawa (Japanese: 那須川 天心, Nasukawa Tenshin; born August 18, 1998) is a Japanese professional boxer, former professional kickboxer and mixed martial artist. A generational talent, Nasukawa was regarded as a top pound for pound talent throughout most of his career as a professional kickboxer and one of the greatest kickboxers in the history of the sport.

A professional kickboxer between 2012 and 2022, Nasukawa is the former RISE Bantamweight (55 kg) and RISE World Featherweight (57.5 kg) champion. He was also the ISKA Unified Rules Featherweight (57 kg) and Oriental Rules Bantamweight (55 kg) champion, as well as the 2017 Rizin Flyweight (57 kg) Kickboxing Tournament winner. At the end of his professional kickboxing career, in July 2022, Nasukawa was ranked as the best kickboxer under 58 kg and the best pound for pound kickboxer in the world by Combat Press.

== Amateur kickboxing career ==
It is said that he initially started learning Kyokushin Karate at age five as his father who worried about his timidity forced him to enter a karate dojo. He won the 2009 International Youth Kyokushin Karate Championships, when he was a fifth grader in elementary school. After that, he became more drawn to kickboxing and began to train it.

"I practiced karate until I was in sixth grade. I was winning competitions at a national level," he told Bleacher Report. "I wanted to participate on that big stage. There was no specific individual that inspired me. I was attracted to the stage."

Nasukawa's kickboxing style is influenced by Boxing, Muay Thai and his Kyokushin Karate background. Nasukawa fights out of the southpaw stance, and is primarily a counter puncher, staying on the outer perimeter of the ring and landing as his opponents try to move in to land strikes. He is well known for his tendency to mix in acrobatic techniques like spinning kicks, rolling kicks, and jumping knees with high precision and success.

"I don't even want to imagine what kind of fighter he will turn out to be in five years," one of Nasukawa's opponents, MMA fighter Yusaku Nakamura said in praise. Nasukawa defeated Nakamura in a kickboxing bout by technical knock out after Nasukawa dropped Nakamura three times. In the fight Nasukawa landed a counter spinning drop kick to Nakamura's face, breaking his nose.

Tenshin amassed an amateur record of 99–5–3 by the age of 15 before he turned professional in kickboxing.

== Professional kickboxing career ==
=== Early career ===
Nasukawa made his highly anticipated professional kickboxing debut at the centennial RISE event on July 12, 2014. He was booked to face Tomo Arimatsu. Nasukawa won the fight by a first-round knockout, needing just 58 seconds to stop Arimatsu with a head kick. Nasukawa next faced Aleksandro Hideo at Rise 101 on September 28, 2014. He first knocked Hideo down with a left body kick in the second minute of the opening round, which he followed by a second knockdown with a step-in left knee which left his opponent unable to rise from the canvas.

Nasukawa faced the 20-fight veteran Makoto Kushima at Rise 102 on November 16, 2014, in his third fight with the promotion. He won the fight by unanimous decision, the first decision victory of his professional career. Two of the judges scored the bout 30–28 for Nasukawa, while the third judge scored the bout 30–27 in his favor.

Nasukawa was expected to face the BigBang super bantamweight champion Taisuke Degai at the inaugural BLADE event on December 29, 2014. Degai withdrew from the bout on November 29, for undisclosed reasons, and was replaced by Kim Jin Min. Nasukawa won the fight by a first-round knockout, needing just 100 seconds to stop Min with a well place knee strike to the body.

=== RISE Bantamweight champion ===
==== Nasukawa vs. Fujimoto ====
Nasukawa, at the time the #4 ranked RISE bantamweight contender, was booked to face the former Shootboxing Japan super bantamweight champion Masahiro Fujimoto at Rise 104 on March 21, 2015. He knocked Fujimoto twice by the 2:06 minute mark of the first round, first time with a flurry of punches and knees and the second time with a left straight. The second knockdown left his opponent sprawled on the canvas and unable to rise, which forced the referee to wave the fight off. Following this victory, Nasukawa was named the eFight "Fighter of the Month" for the month of March. As Nasukawa took no damage in the fight, on March 30 it was announced that Nasukawa would face every RISE KAMINARIMON amateur champion in exhibition bouts on April 5.

==== Nasukawa vs. Murakoshi ====
After making quick work of Fujimoto, and amassing a 6–0 professional record, Nasukawa was given the chance to challenge the reigning RISE Bantamweight champion Yuta Murakoshi. The fight was scheduled as the main event of Rise 105, which took place on May 31, 2015. Murakoshi entered the bout riding a nine-fight winning streak, although this was his first title defense. After a relatively even first round, Nasukawa was able to force a standing count with a combination of a left knee and a left hook. He quickly followed this up with a combination of punches which prompted the referee to step in and stop the fight. He became the youngest titlist in RISE history, having captured the title at the age of 16 years and 10 months. This victory earned him the eFight "Fighter of the Month" award for May.

==== Blade Japan Cup ====
On June 9, a week after he had captured the RISE title, it was announced that Nasukawa would be one of eight participants in the BLADE 2 super bantamweight tournament. Event promoter Genki Yamaguchi saw him as the favorite to win, stating: "Nasukawa is the perfect candidate for the championship. The question is, who can stop him?". The one-day tournament took place at the Ota City General Gymnasium in Ōta, Tokyo on August 1, 2015.

Nasukawa faced the DEEP KICK super bantamweight champion Masahiko Suzuki in the tournament quarterfinals. He knocked Suzuki down twice inside of the first two minutes of the opening round, with a counter left straight and a left hook, which resulted in an automatic technical knockout victory for him under the tournament rules. Nasukawa faced Yukinori Ogasawara in the penultimate bout of the contest. He won the fight by a third-round knockout, flooring Ogasawara with a left hook. Nasukawa advanced to the finals, where he faced the incumbent Shootboxing Japan 55 kg champion Taiki Naito. He knocked Naito down thrice by the 1:41 minute mark of the first round, which resulted in a technical knockout victory for him. Aside from the tournament title, Nasukawa was awarded a ¥3,000,000 cash prize as well. He was awarded the eFight August "Fighter of the Month", his third such award of the year.

==== Nasukawa vs. Alamos, Kalistis, Miyamoto ====
On September 9, 2015, it was announced that Nasukawa would fight at Rise 108 on November 8, 2015. His opponent was revealed nine days later. Nasukawa was expected to fight a non-title bout with the former WBC Muaythai World Featherweight champion Hakim Hamech. Hamech later withdrew for undisclosed reasons and was replaced by Mike Alamos (26–6). Nasukawa won the fight by a first-round knockout. He first knocked Alamos down with a left straight, before stopping him with a left knee to the body, which left his opponent unable to beat the eight-count.

Nasukawa faced Manolis Kalistis in the co-main event of Rise 109 on January 31, 2016. He won the fight by unanimous decision, with two scorecards of 30–26 and one scorecard of 30–25. Nasukawa knocked Kalistis down twice: first time with a left hook to the body and the second time with a flurry of punches to which the Greek fighter failed to respond. Nasukawa was shown a yellow card in the first round for throwing knee strikes while holding Kalistis' head with both hands.

Nasukawa faced the reigning WBC Muay Thai International Super Bantamweight titlist Keisuke Miyamoto in a non-title bout at No Kick, No Life 2016 on March 12, 2016. It was the first time that he was scheduled to fight in a five round bout, with all his previous bouts being three minute three round bouts. Miyamoto was originally expected to participate in the 2015 Blade Japan Cup, which Nasukawa eventually won, but withdrew with a fist injury. Nasukawa won the fight by a second-round knockout. He first staggered Miyamoto with a left straight, before knocking him out with a left knee to the body.

=== RISE & ISKA bantamweight champion ===
==== Nasukawa vs. Cordeiro ====
Nasukawa faced the undefeated Portuguese kickboxer Frederico Cordeiro for the vacant ISKA Oriental Rules Bantamweight (55 kg) title. The title bout was scheduled as the main event of Rise 110, which took place on March 26, 2016, just two weeks after his previous fight. He was highly complimentary of Cordeiro during the pre-fight press conference, stating: "Of all the opponents I've had so far, he's one of the strongest". Nasukawa captured his third professional title by unanimous decision. Two of the judges scored the fight 49–45 in his favor, while the third judge awarded him a 48–46 scorecard. The contest was briefly stopped in the fourth round, due to an inadvertent clash of heads, which made it difficult for Nasukawa to see out of his right eye.

==== Nasukawa vs. Totts, Bin ====
Nasukawa faced the Italian national featherweight champion Tarik Totts (14–3–1) in a non-title bout in the main event of Rise 111 on May 29, 2016. He won the fight by a second-round knockout. He knocked Totts down once in the first round, with a left hook, and stopped him with a body kick at the 1:49 minute mark of the next round. Nasukawa was next booked to face Lin Bin in the co-main event of Kunlun Fight 49 / Rebels 45, a cross-promotional event organized by the Japan-based REBELS and China-based Kunlun Fight. It took place at the Ota City General Gymnasium in Ōta, Tokyo on August 7, 2016. The bout was contested at a 55.5 kg catchweight. Nasukawa won the fight by knockout, 110 seconds into the opening round.

==== Nasukawa vs. Murakoshi II ====
Nasukawa made his first RISE Bantamweight (55 kg) Championship defense against the number one ranked RISE bantamweight contender Yuta Murakoshi. The fight headlined Rise 113, which took place at the Korakuen Hall in Tokyo, Japan on September 25, 2016. The pair previously met on May 31, 2015, with Nasukawa beating Murakoshi and taking his bantamweight title by a second-round technical knockout. Nasukawa won the rematch by a majority decision. Two of the judges scored the fight 50–47 and 50–45 in his favor, while the third judge scored it as an even 50–50 draw. He was dissatisfied with his performance, saying in the post-fight interview: "I fought a fight that wasn't worth this belt... I was too cautious and my opponent didn't come forward like I expected".

==== Nasukawa vs. Wanchalong ====
On September 15, 2016, it was revealed that Nasukawa would fight at the inaugural KNOCK OUT event, which was expected to take place on December 5, 2016. On November 4, it was announced that he would face the two-weight Lumpinee Stadium and two-weight Channel 7 Stadium champion Wanchalong PK.Saenchai. Aside from Murakoshi, it was the highest profile fight of his career up to that point. A day later, Nasukawa transferred from TARGET gym to the newly opened TEAM TEPPEN, which was founded by his father and head trainer Hiroyuki Nasukawa. On fight night, Nasukawa won by a first-round knockout, needing just 38 seconds to floor Wanchalong with a spinning back-fist. Combat Press later named it their 2016 "Knockout of the Year", while eFight named Nasukawa their December 2016 "Fighter of the Month".

==== Nasukawa vs. Amnat, Sheehan ====
Nasukawa was booked to face the five-time defending IBF flyweight champion Amnat Ruenroeng on the next KNOCK OUT event, Knock Out Vol. 1, which took place on February 12, 2017. In front of a capacity crowd of 3,200 people, Nasukawa won the fight by a fourth-round knockout. He slowly built into the fight, before knocking Amnat out with a left hook to the body in the final minute of the penultimate round. Viewers voted Nasukawa the "Best Fighter" of the event, while the fight was voted the "Best Bout" of the event. Following this loss, Amnat announced his retirement from all professional competition.

Nasukawa made his first ISKA Oriental Rules Bantamweight (55 kg) World Championship defense against the ISKA Muay Thai European Bantamweight titleholder Ryan Sheehan in the main event of RISE 117 on May 20, 2017. Nasukawa defeated Sheehan by a body shot knockout in the first round, after just 72 seconds. After the fight, K-1 World MAX veteran Kizaemon Saiga entered the ring and asked for a fight with Nasukawa, either under kickboxing or mixed martial arts rules.

=== Move to featherweight ===
==== First featherweight bouts ====
Nasukawa faced Kizaemon Saiga on the undercard of Rizin World Grand Prix 2017 Part 1 on July 30, 2017, in what was Nasukawa's kickboxing debut with Rizin. The fight was scheduled as a mixed rules bout: first round was five minutes of kickboxing, and the second round was slated to be a five-minute round under mixed martial arts rules. In front of an audience of 17,730, Nasukawa won the fight by a first-round knockout, stopping the veteran with a left cross.

At a press conference held by KNOCK OUT on June 20, 2022, it was announced that Nasukawa would appear at their next event, against an opponent which would be announced at a later date. His opponent, the former Lumpinee Stadium flyweight and bantamweight champion Visanlek Meibukai, was announced a month later. The fight was scheduled as the main event of Knock Out Vol. 4, which took place at the Ota City General Gymnasium on August 20, 2017. Nasukawa won the fight by a third-round technical knockout. The contest was stopped on the advice of the ringside physician, due to a cut above Visanlek's eye which was caused by a knee strike.

Nasukawa faced the multiple-time World Kickboxing Network champion Ignacio Capllonch in the co-main event of Rise 121 on November 23, 2017. The bout was initially expected to be the second RISE Bantamweight title defense for Nasukawa, but was changed to a catchweight non-title bout, after Capllonch missed weight. Capllonch weighed-in at 55.8 kg, which was 0.8 kg over the championship limit. He was deducted a point before the start of the contest and had to wear the larger 10 oz gloves, instead of the usual 8 oz gloves. Nasukawa won the fight by a third-round technical knockout. He knocked his opponent twice before the stoppage, both times with a left hook to the body.

==== Rizin Flyweight tournament ====
Nasukawa participated in the 2017 Rizin FF Flyweight (57 kg) tournament, which was held at Rizin World Grand Prix 2017: Final Round on December 31, 2017. The other three participants of the one-day tournament were Yuta Hamamoto, Yamato Fujita and Mitsuhisa Sunabe, with Nasukawa being booked to face Hamamoto in the semifinals. He won the fight by a flying knee knockout, stopping Hamamoto with two seconds left in the second round. Advancing to the finals, Nasukawa faced Yamato Fujita. He needed just 97 seconds to knock Fujita down thrice, which resulted in a technical knockout victory for him under the Rizin kickboxing rules.

Nasukawa fought in two non-title bouts, before his next RISE title bout. He first faced the three-weight Lumpinee Boxing Stadium champion Suakim Sit Sor Thor Taew at Knock Out First Impact on February 12, 2018. Nasukawa won the fight by unanimous decision, with scores of 50–48, 49–47 and 49–47. Nasukawa next faced Yusaku Nakamura at Rizin 10 - Fukuoka on May 6, 2018. He won the fight by a second-round technical knockout.

=== RISE World Featherweight champion ===
==== Nasukawa vs. Rodtang ====
Nasukawa faced the two-time Rajadamnern Stadium "Fight of the Year" winner Rodtang Jitmuangnon for the inaugural RISE Featherweight (57.5 kg) World Championship. The title bout headlined Rise 125, which took place at the Makuhari Messe Event Hall in Chiba on June 17, 2018. The fight went was ruled a split decision draw after the first five rounds were contested, and accordingly went into an extra round, after which Nasukawa was awarded a unanimous decision victory. Tenshin's behavior during the fight was controversial, as he was able to call his own time-outs, stalled for time, as well as telling the referee to stop the bout for groin shots which, in review, never occurred. The fight results were considered controversial by some. Analyst Jack Slack later wrote: "Tenshin Nasukawa was awarded the decision, keeping his undefeated record, but it was a hard sell and it came at the expense of the judges’ credibility." Similarly, K-1 founder Kazuyoshi Ishii commented on his Twitter account: "I'm sorry for Tenshin's fans, but Rodtang was the winner". Not all media outlets agreed with such statements; for example, eFight named Nasukawa their June "Fighter of the Month" following this victory.

==== Nasukawa vs. Horiguchi, Naito II ====
It was announced on August 24, 2018, that Nasukawa would face the Rizin FF bantamweight champion Kyoji Horiguchi under Kickboxing rules at Rizin FF 13. The bout took place at the Saitama Super Arena on September 30, 2018. He won the fight by unanimous decision. Nasukawa faced Taiki Naito at RISE 129 on November 17, 2018. The two previously fought three years prior, on August 1, 2015, with Nasukawa winning their first meeting by a first-round technical knockout. He won the rematch in the same manner, knocking Naito down three times before two minutes of the bout had elapsed.

==== RISE Featherweight World Series ====
On January 22, 2019, RISE announced they would be holding a World Series tournament at 58 kg. Aside from the tournament title, a prize of ¥10,000,000 would be awarded to the eventual winner, while the runner-up would earn a prize of ¥2,000,000. The tournament was expected to take place at three separate event, with Nasukawa being booked to face the World Kickboxing Network Oriental and Thai Boxing champion Federico Roma in the quarterfinals, which were held at the Ota City General Gymnasium in Ōta, Tokyo on March 10, 2019. He won the fight by a third-round knockout. Nasukawa knocked Roma down early in the third round with a left straight, which left a cut above his right eye. The ringside physician was called in to check on the cut, but he allowed the bout to go on. Soon after the action resumed, Nasukawa was able to floor his opponent with a cartwheel kick, which left him unable to rise from the canvas in time.

Nasukawa then made two appearances under the Rizin banner. He was first booked to face Fritz Biagtan at Rizin 15 - Yokohama on April 29, 2019, whom he beat by a third-round technical knockout. Nasukawa next faced Martin Blanco at Rizin 16 - Kobe on June 2, 2019, for the vacant ISKA Featherweight (57 kg) World Championship. He captured his fifth professional title by a second-round technical knockout.

After notching back-to-back victories in Rizin, Nasukawa returned to RISE in order to face the three-weight Lumpinee Boxing Stadium champion Suakim PK Saenchaimuaythaigym in the semifinals of the World Series, which were held on July 21, 2019. He won the fight by a third-round technical knockout. The bout was stopped on the advice of the ringside doctor, due to a cut caused by Nasukawa's rolling thunder. Nasukawa advanced to the tournament finals, which were held on September 16, 2019, where he faced Shirō. He won the fight by unanimous decision. After capturing the World Series title, Nasukawa was named the September "Fighter of the Month" by eFight.

==== Later kickboxing career ====
Nasukawa faced the KNOCK OUT Super Bantamweight champion Rui Ebata at Rizin 20 - Saitama on December 31, 2019. He knocked Ebata down three times by the 2:40 minute mark of the opening round to earn a first-round technical victory.

Nasukawa faced the once-defeated Yuki Kasahara at Rise on Abema on July 12, 2020. The non-title bout was broadcast by Abema and was held in front of an empty arena, due to measures implemented to combat the COVID-19 pandemic. Nasukawa won the fight by a first-round technical knockout, knocking Kasahara down three times by the midway point of the round.

Nasukawa faced the K-1 veteran Kouzi at Rizin 24 – Saitama, which took place at the Saitama Super Arena on September 27, 2020. He won the fight by unanimous decision. Nasuawa next faced the RISE veteran Yuki, in what was Yuki's retirement fight, at RISE DEAD OR ALIVE 2020 Osaka on November 1, 2020. Nasukawa dominated the fight, knocking Yuki down once in the first round, and three times in the second fight before the referee was forced to stop the bout. Nasuawa was booked to face the WBC Muay Thai World champion Kumandoi Petcharoenvit, in his fourth and final fight of the year, at Rizin 26 – Saitama on December 31, 2020. He won the fight by unanimous decision.

Nasukawa faced Shiro at RISE Eldorado 2021 on February 28, 2021, who he had previously beaten by unanimous decision in the finals of the 2019 RISE World Series Featherweight tournament. Shiro had earned the right to fight Nasukawa once again by winning the 2020 RISE Dead or Alive tournament, during which he beat Seiki Ueyama and the RISE bantamweight champion Masahiko Suzuki. Nasukawa won the rematch by unanimous decision, with all three judges scoring the fight 30–28 in his favor. During the post-fight interview, Nasukawa announced that he was in the final year of his contract with RISE (which was set to expire 2022) and planned to fight twice more under their banner.

Nasukawa faced the RISE Bantamweight champion Masahiko Suzuki at RISE World Series 2021 on September 23, 2021, in his penultimate bout with RISE. He won the fight by unanimous decision.

Nasukawa faced the 2021 RISE World Series -53 kg tournament winner Kazane Nagai in his final fight with the promotion. The fight took place at RISE ELDORADO 2022 on April 2, 2022. As Kazane likewise trained at TEAM TEPPEN, Nasukawa chose the leave the gym prior to the fight. He prepared for the fight at Team Target, while Kazane was trained by Nasukawa's father and former head trainer Hiroyuki Nasukawa. Nasukawa won the fight by majority decision. Two of the judges scored the fight 30–29 for Nasukawa, while the third judge scored the fight an even 29–29.

=== Nasukawa–Takeru rivalry ===
==== Buildup to the fight ====
Nasukawa has been calling out Three-division K-1 champion Takeru Segawa since June 8, 2015. But due to contractual obligations, both fighters were not able to meet in the ring. At that time, K-1 and Rise were in a "Kickboxing Cold War" since 2010. On August 5, 2015, Takeru told the media that he was interested in fighting Nasukawa if K-1 can organize it. K-1 Japan group producer, Mitsuru Miyata, demanded that Nasukawa sign an exclusive contract with K-1 to be able to make the fight happen. Nasukawa's trainer and RISE president, Takashi Ito, told combat sports magazine Fight & Life, that he will agree to let Nasukawa fight in a K-1 event but he's not willing to give up Nasukawa to an exclusive contract with K-1.

In 2015, K-1 officially made a partnership with the new MMA promotion, Rizin Fighting Federation. Rizin president, Nobuyuki Sakakibara, announced that Rizin is willing to make partnerships with every fighting organization so RISE began to work with Rizin as well. This deal made it more possible for a Nasukawa–Segawa matchup. November 8, 2015, Nasukawa had a knockout victory over French Muay Thai fighter Mike Alamos. After the match in the ring, Nasukawa announced that he wanted to fight in Rizin.

On November 21, 2015, Takeru made his first defense of his K-1 55 kg world title against Charles Bongiovanni, he won the fight by TKO. After the match, during the in-ring interview, Takeru announced his desire to fight in Rizin, 2 weeks after Nasukawa announced the same. When Takeru returned backstage, Nasukawa approached him and demanded the fight. The fight can happen in Rizin even with the Rise and K-1 cold war. During the press conference, Takeru mentioned that he did not recognize Nasukawa and could not understand what he was saying due to the crowd noise and thought he was just a fan. Takeru confirmed that he is willing to accept the fight if offered. After this event, Nasukawa tweeted that Takeru agreed to fight him on New Year's Eve.

On December 8, 2015, Rizin announced a fight between Takeru and Chinese fighter, Yang Ming, for their New Year's Eve event. At the press conference, Rizin president, Sakakibara, acknowledged requests to make a Nasukawa vs. Takeru fight, however, he said there wasn't enough time to promote the fight and promised to try to make it happen in 2016. On June 18, 2017, after Takeru knocked out Buvaisar Paskhaev, K-1 commentator, Masato, expressed his desire to see Takeru fight Nasukawa but the 2 other commentators ignored his comments. 2 days later, K-1's official YouTube channel uploaded the full fight video of Takeru and Paskhaev but a few hours later it was deleted and re-uploaded without Masato's comments.

On August 29, 2017, Rizin executive Nobuhiko Takada said on Twitter, "Two of the biggest superstars of kickboxing, Takeru vs Tenshin Nasukawa should be made right now! If this super-fight will not happen due to the (sic) cold war, it is heinous crime! Let's make this! Make miracle!" A few hours later a K-1 broadcaster trolled Takada on Twitter. A few days later, Takada apologized and promised to never talk about a fighter from another organization and deleted every tweet about Nasukawa vs Takeru.

On December 31, 2017, Nasukawa won Rizin's Kickboxing 57 kg tournament. In an attempt to quash the cold war and influence K-1 and Rise to make the Takeru fight, Nasukawa made sure the show was being broadcast live so Rizin would not be able to cut any of his comments. Post-fight, in the ring, Nasukawa engaged the crowd by asking who they want him to fight next and the crowd screamed Takeru's name.

In February 2018, M-1 Sports Media, which operates K-1, filed a lawsuit against Tenshin, his father Hiroyuki, Rise president Takashi Ito and Rizin president Sakakibara. According to the lawsuit, it all started three years ago when Nasukawa called out Takeru to fight. More recently during Rizin's New Year's Eve event when Nasukawa asked the audience who they want him to fight next. They claim that it's an unfair business practice to involve another fighter's name from a different organization. And, they claim that many people has negative image about Takeru run away from Nasukawa, and they lost 6 sponsors. And, they file a damage suit 137,000,000 yen. But, 1 of 6 sponsors told Japanese weekly magazine Shukan Shincho "Our contract of K-1, we distribute Bento 3 times only. We can't understand why K-1 demands too expensive money".

On March 16, 2018, Rise president Takashi Ito, former K-1 fighter Hiroya and his lawyer, accused K-1 Japan Group's exclusive contract, illegal based on the competition law. Hiroya's lawyer told the media, that the way K-1's contract work makes you not fight for a year for your contract to expire. Every fight you make with the organization, extends your contract for another year from your last fight and the only way to get out of the contract is not get paid for a year. Hiroya cites this as the reason why Segawa could not fight Nasukawa as he knows Segawa as a friend and will not back down to a fight.

==== Nasukawa vs. Takeru ====
Rizin FF president Nobuyuki Sakakibara announced at a press conference, held on December 24, 2021, that the Takeru fight would be held at a neutral venue some time in June, in collaboration with both K-1 and RISE. Both fighters would have to weigh in at 58 kg at the official weigh-ins and no more than 62 kg at a second weigh-in held on fight day. At the time of the fight's scheduling, Takeru and Nasukawa were considered as the two best kickboxer in the world, after Superbon Banchamek. The official date and venue were announced at a second press conference, held on April 1, 2022. It took place on June 19, 2022, at the Tokyo Dome, marking the return of a kickboxing headlined event to the venue for the first time since 2006. The rules for the bout were announced six days later: it was to be contested across three three-minute rounds, under the RISE ruleset, with one additional round in case of a draw. The entire event was broadcast by Abema TV as a pay per view. It was initially expected that the two-hour portion containing the main event would also be broadcast by Fuji TV, who later backed out after allegations surfaced connecting RIZIN president Sakakibara with the yakuza.

In front of a sold-out audience of 56,399 at the Tokyo Dome, Nasukawa won the long awaited fight by unanimous decision. Nasukawa knocked Takeru down with a left hook counter to his right straight in the very first round of the three-round affair, which proved the pivotal moment, as it edged the fight in his favor on all five of the judges' scorecards. The total scores were total scores of 29–28, 30–28, 30–28, 30–28 and 30–27. The event sold around 500,000 PPVs. At the post-fight press conference, Nasukawa confirmed his retirement from the sport of kickboxing and his transition to boxing.

== Mixed martial arts career ==
After his Muay Thai debut on December 5, 2016, Japanese MMA promotion Rizin Fighting Federation offered to make his MMA debut on their December 29 event. Nasukawa accepted the short notice offer, and began to train MMA for the first time. He won his first fight by TKO in the first round. After the fight, he announced his desire to fight in Rizin's New Year's Eve event 2 days later. Rizin president Nobuyuki Sakakibara granted his wish and he won the fight against Dylan Kawika Oligo by guillotine choke in the second round.

In 2017, he was officially signed by Rizin.

In 2017, MMA agent Shu Hirata, who manages UFC fighters Francis Ngannou and Takeya Mizugaki, told the media that the UFC offered Nasukawa a $60,000 (salary: $30,000, win bonus: $30,000) contract.

In January 2018, Nasukawa told Japanese sports magazine Sports Graphic that he wants kickboxing as his main sport until he becomes 22 or 23 years old, and after that, he would consider a shift in MMA or pro boxing.

On August 15, 2018, Evolve MMA announced that they have sponsored Nasukawa. Founder, Chairman, and CEO of both Evolve MMA and ONE Championship, Chatri Sityodtong, stated that he is interested in signing Nasukawa after his contract expires.

== Professional boxing career ==
=== Initial contract offers ===
International Boxing Hall of Fame and World Boxing Hall of Famer, professional boxing promoter Akihiko Honda of Teiken Promotions Inc., offered Nasukawa a move to boxing since he was 12 years old.

When Nasukawa was a 14-year-old junior high school student, Teiken Promotions offered Nasukawa a contract including a signing bonus of more than $100,000, but Nasukawa turned down the job due to his love for kickboxing. Teiken Promotions still continues to offer him a boxing contract. One of Teiken Gym trainer Yūichi Kasai, who made 4 world boxing champions such as Takashi Miura and Toshiaki Nishioka became Nasukawa's part-time boxing coach.

Nasukawa wants to fight both kickboxing and boxing. However, the Japan Boxing Commission doesn't permit Japanese professional boxers to fight in other professional combat sports. In September 2018, Nasukawa told AbemaTV, that he wants to fight boxing in other countries and stay as a kickboxer in Japan.

Three-division boxing world champion Naoya Inoue's trainer and promoter, former two-time boxing world champion Hideyuki Ohashi said "Nasukawa can win a boxing world title before his 2nd professional match, and the break world record of Vasyl Lomachenko and Saensak Muangsurin". He is interested in a future bout between Naoya Inoue vs Tenshin Nasukawa in Tokyo Dome.

Nasukawa was offered to fight at the 2020 Summer Olympics. He showed interest in fighting at the Olympics, but he doesn't want to fight his friend and former teammate at Team Teppen, AIBA Youth 2016 World Champion, Hayato Tsutsumi.

=== Early career ===
==== Nasukawa vs. Yonaha ====
Nasukawa undertook his professional boxing license examination on February 9, 2023. Contrary to usual practice, Nasukawa was the only person to be tested that day, with nearly a hundred spectators gathering in the venue. Nasukawa passed after he successfully made the featherweight limit of 58 kilograms, scored 97 out of a possible 100 points on the written test, satisfied the physical examination and went through a three round sparring session with the future Japanese bantamweight title challenger Jin Minamide.

After acquiring the B-class boxing license from the Japanese Boxing Commission, which allowed him to compete in six round bouts, Nasukawa was booked to make his professional boxing debut against Yuki Yonaha, who was at the time ranked as the fourth-best bantamweight by the aforementioned JBC. The six round bout was booked for the undercard of an Amazon Prime broadcast card, which took place at the Ariake Arena in Ariake, Tokyo on April 8, 2023. He won the fight by unanimous decision. Two of the ringside officials awarded Nasukawa every round of the bout, while judge Biney Martin scored the fight 59–54 in his favor. Nasukawa scored the sole knockdown of the fight in the second round, when he was able to knock his opponent down with a counter right hook.

==== Nasukawa vs. Guzman ====
Nasukawa made his second boxing appearance against the undefeated Juan Flores Aceves. The contest took place on the undercard of the unified light-flyweight championship bout between Kenshiro Teraji and Hekkie Budler on September 18, 2023, at the Ariake Arena in Tokyo, Japan. Aceves was forced to withdraw from the bout on September 2, after contracting COVID-19, and was replaced by Luis Guzman, who stepped in on two-weeks notice. Nasukawa won the fight by unanimous decision, with all three judges awarding him an 80–72 scorecard. He twice knocked his opponent down, once in the second and once in the seventh round. Nasukawa revealed, during a talk show appearance on October 28, that he had suffered a left hand injury in the fourth round of his meeting with Guzman. Although he was initially predicted to recover within a month, Nasukawa's carpal instability diagnosis prolonged his recovery.

==== Nasukawa vs. Robles ====
Following his most recent victory, Nasukawa was ranked sixth in the Oriental and Pacific Boxing Federation super bantamweight division. During a live talk show on October 28, 2023, he disclosed that he had sustained an injury to his left hand in his previous bout and had been diagnosed with left carpal instability. The injury required immobilization in a cast for three weeks, after which he resumed training on October 13. Although he was initially unable to strike with his left hand, Nasukawa indicated that he was in negotiations for a potential bout scheduled for January.

At a press conference held by the Teiken Boxing Gym at the Tokyo Dome Hotel in Bunkyo, Tokyo, on December 14, 2024, it was announced that Nasukawa would face Luis Robles, who was ranked 13th by the World Boxing Association and 14th by the World Boxing Organization in the bantamweight division at the time. The bout was scheduled to take place on January 23, 2024, at the EDION Arena Osaka in Osaka, Japan, as part of the event titled Prime Video Presents Live Boxing 6, and was broadcast by Amazon Prime Video. During the same press conference, Nasukawa stated that he had resumed sparring only the previous day due to the hand injury sustained in his bout against Luis Guzman. The contest was scheduled as an eight-round bout at 121 pounds (approximately 54.89 kg).

Nasukawa won the bout by third-round technical stoppage after Robles withdrew before the start of the fourth round due to a right ankle injury. The victory marked the first stoppage win of Nasukawa’s professional boxing career. At the post-fight press conference, a representative of his gym stated that Nasukawa’s next bout was expected to be his first scheduled ten-round fight and that a move to a lower weight class, potentially below 54.8 kg or to the bantamweight limit of 53.5 kg, was being considered. Nasukawa stated that he had not sustained significant damage in the fight and expressed confidence competing at bantamweight, noting that the bout had been contested at the lightest weight of his professional career. Nasukawa was named the "Newcomer of the Year" by the Japanese Boxing Commission at the 2023 Boxing Athlete of the Year Awards held in Tokyo, Japan on February 19, 2024.

==== Nasukawa vs. Rodriguez ====
On May 10, 2024, in an interview with FOX Sports Australia, Bob Arum, the founder and CEO of Top Rank, expressed interest in organizing a bout between former WBO bantamweight champion Jason Moloney and fighter Nasukawa. At the time, Nasukawa was ranked seventh in the bantamweight division by the World Boxing Association (WBA) and tenth by the World Boxing Organization (WBO). However, the fight did not come to fruition, and Nasukawa was instead scheduled to face Jonathan Rodriguez, who was ranked fourth in the WBA bantamweight rankings and had previously suffered a single defeat. The bout between Nasukawa and Rodriguez took place on July 20, 2024, at the Ryōgoku Kokugikan in Tokyo, Japan. The event was broadcast live on Amazon Prime Video under the "Prime Video Presents Live Boxing 9" series, as part of a sponsorship agreement between Nasukawa and the streaming platform. The fight was scheduled as a 10-round contest at a catchweight of 120 pounds (approximately 54.4 kg). In front of a sell-out crowd of 8,000 spectators, Nasukawa secured a victory by third-round technical knockout. At the time of the stoppage, he was leading on all three judges' scorecards with a score of 20–18.

==== Nasukawa vs. Asilo ====
After his victory over Jonathan Rodriguez, Nasukawa was ranked the second-best bantamweight by the World Boxing Association (WBA) and third by the World Boxing Council (WBC), according to an update issued on August 18, 2024. Four days later, on August 22, Teiken Promotions held a press conference to announce a two-day world championship event scheduled for October 13 and 14, 2024, at the Ariake Arena in Tokyo, Japan. The event would feature seven championship bouts, including Nasukawa's first title fight against the undefeated Gerwin Asilo, who was ranked second in the WBO's bantamweight division at the time. The bout, for the vacant WBO Asia Pacific bantamweight title, marked Nasukawa's debut at the bantamweight limit, the lightest weight class he had competed in as a professional. As with his previous matches, the fight was set to be broadcast live domestically by Amazon Prime Video, with whom he had an existing sponsorship agreement.

Nasukawa knocked his opponent down once in the ninth round en route to securing a unanimous decision victory. One scorecard showed a seven-point difference, while the other two had a five-point margin. Despite the significant point disparity, many boxing analysts noted Nasukawa's struggles throughout the fight, most notably the former two-weight champion Takanori Hatakeyama. He was criticized for relying heavily on a repetitive right jab and left straight combination, failing to target the body effectively, and becoming overly dependent on his speed.

==== Nasukawa vs. Moloney ====
During a press conference on December 27, 2024, Teiken Promotions announced that Nasukawa would face former WBO bantamweight champion Jason Moloney in a ten-round bantamweight bout on February 24, 2025, at the Ariake Arena in Tokyo, Japan. The event would be broadcast domestically by Amazon Prime Video. In the press conference, Nasukawa revealed that he had been offered five potential opponents for the February fight, stating, "This was the first time the camp had given me candidates... but I chose Moloney without watching." Nasukawa entered the fight as a -270 favorite, with the former champion listed as a slight underdog at +210 odds. He won the bout by unanimous decision, with judges Edward Ligas (97-93), Michiaki Someya (97-93), and Mekin Sumo (98-92) scoring the fight in his favor.

==== Nasukawa vs. Santillan ====
The 10-round bantamweight encounter occupied the co-main event slot of Junto Nakatani vs Ryosuke Nishida, taking place at the Ariake Colosseum, Japan. Nasukawa secured a comfortable points victory against Victor Santillan, and put on a glittering display down the stretch, claiming two scorecards of 99-91, and one wider reflection of 100-90, to consolidate his unanimous decision victory, taking himself one step closer towards a world title shot at 118 lbs.

==== Nasukawa vs. Inoue ====
After his unanimous decision victory over Jason Moloney, Nasukawa was ranked as the #1 bantamweight contender by the World Boxing Council (WBC), #2 by the World Boxing Organization (WBO), and #4 by the International Boxing Federation (IBF). This ranking gained significant importance on August 6, 2025, when WBC and IBF champion Junto Nakatani vacated his titles to move up to the super bantamweight division. As a result, Nasukawa and the WBC's #2-ranked bantamweight, former WBA bantamweight champion Takuma Inoue, became the mandatory challengers for the vacant championship, in line with the WBC's regulations.

The two fighters quickly entered negotiations and officially confirmed that they had reached an agreement during a press conference on September 25, 2025. The vacant title fight took place at the Toyota Arena in Tokyo, Japan, on November 24, 2025, as part of the "Prime Video Boxing 14" event, which was broadcast by Amazon Prime Video. Nasukawa failed to justify his role as a significant betting favorite, as he lost the fight by unanimous decision, with scores of 116—112, 116—112, 117—111. Tenshin Nasukawa initially impressed with his creative striking and unconventional feints, even rocking the former champion early with a powerful overhand left that kept the scorecards level through four rounds. However, his output and stamina noticeably faded in the second half of the fight, allowing Takuma Inoue to outmaneuver him and secure a clear unanimous decision victory. It was his first professional loss across all three combat sports he had competed in.

==== Nasukawa vs. Estrada ====
On December 3, 2025, during a general meeting in Bangkok, Thailand, the World Boxing Council (WBC) ordered a bout between Nasukawa and two-weight world champion Juan Francisco Estrada. The match was scheduled to determine the next mandatory challenger for the WBC Bantamweight Championship. At the time, Nasukawa was ranked as the #2 bantamweight contender in the WBC rankings, while Estrada held the #1 spot. The fight was scheduled to take place at the Ryōgoku Kokugikan in Tokyo, Japan on April 11, 2026 and was broadcast domestically by Amazon Prime. Nasukawa won by retirement at the end of round nine.

Inoue vs. Nasukawa II

On 27 September 2026, Takuma Inoue faced Tenshin Nasukawa in a rematch for the WBC bantamweight title at Toyota Arena Tokyo, Japan. Inoue won by unanimous decision, with judges scoring the bout 116–111, 116–111 and 114–113. Despite being knocked down by Nasukawa in the seventh round, Inoue retained his title, securing his second successful defence.

== Exhibition bouts ==
=== Nasukawa vs. Mayweather ===
On November 5, 2018, it was announced that Nasukawa was expected to face the undefeated boxer Floyd Mayweather Jr. at Rizin 14 on December 31, 2018. The supposed rules for this bout were not determined. However, on November 7, Mayweather stated that the fight had been announced in error due to a misunderstanding (claiming that he had never even heard of Nasukawa until the press conference) and that he had been booked for an exhibition fight for "a small group of wealthy spectators" that was not meant to be televised. On November 16, 2018, Mayweather announced that the fight is back on. It was to be a 3-round exhibition boxing match. "There was a penalty clause in the contract of an undisclosed amount if he is to use any moves of an MMA nature." In other words, if Tenshin had the urge to throw a kick, he would be heavily fined. Nasukawa landed the first punch of the fight, but Mayweather Jr retaliated with a left hook behind Nasukawa's ear that immediately sent him to the canvas. "This blew my mind. He hit me behind the ear. I was surprised. Right on the button." Nasukawa later said. Within 140 seconds of the one-sided fight, Nasukawa was knocked down 3 times in the first round and his corner subsequently threw in the towel.

=== Nasukawa vs. Gomi ===
Nasukawa faced Takanori Gomi in a two-round exhibition boxing match at Rizin 33 - Saitama on December 31, 2021. The bout ended in a no decision due to time expiring with no stoppage.

== Fighting style ==
Nasukawa is a southpaw and his style is a combination of kickboxing and full contact karate, both of which he has learned and competed at a very young age. Nasukawa is primarily a counter puncher, staying on the outer perimeter of the ring and landing as his opponents try to move in to land strikes. He is well known for his tendency to mix in seemingly flashy techniques like spinning kicks, rolling kicks, and jumping knees with high precision and success.

== Titles and accomplishments ==
=== Kickboxing ===
Professional

- International Sport Karate Association
  - 2015 ISKA Oriental Rules Bantamweight (55 kg) World Championship
    - One successful title defense
  - 2019 ISKA Unified Rules Featherweight (57 kg) World Championship
- RISE
  - 2015 RISE Bantamweight (55 kg) Championship
    - One successful title defense
  - 2015 BLADE Japan Cup (55 kg) Tournament Champion
  - 2018 RISE Featherweight (57 kg) World Championship
  - 2019 RISE World Series -58 kg Tournament Winner
- Rizin
  - 2017 Rizin Flyweight (57 kg) Kickboxing Tournament Winner

Amateur

- RISE
  - 2009 Kaminarimon -35 kg Champion
  - 2010 Kaminarimon -40 kg Champion
- Muay Lok
  - 2010 Muay Lok -35 kg Champion
- M-1
  - 2010 M-1 Junior -40 kg Champion (defended twice)
  - 2011 M-1 Junior -45 kg Champion (defended twice)
  - 2012 M-1 Junior -50 kg Champion
- Martial Arts Japan Kickboxing Federation
  - 2011 MA Kick Junior -42 kg Champion (defended twice)
- Big Bang
  - 2012 Bigbang -50 kg Champion
- All Japan Jr. Kick
  - 2012 All Japan Jr. Kick -50 kg Champion
  - 2013 All Japan Jr. Kick -55 kg Champion

=== Karate ===
- Shin Karate
  - 2010 Shin Karate All Japan K-4 Grand Prix Champion
  - 2013 Shin Karate All Japan G-3 Grand Prix Champion
- Kyokushin Karate (Matsui Group/IKO1)
  - 2009 International Youth Karate Championships 10-year-old boys - 40 kg division Champion

=== Awards ===
- CombatPress.com
  - 2016 Knockout of the Year
  - 2019 Male Fighter of the Year
- Liverkick.com
  - 2016 Prospect of the Year
- Beyond Kickboxing
  - 2022 Beyond Kick "Fighter of the Year"
- eFight.jp
  - 8x Fighter of the Month (March, May and August 2015; Dec 2016; Feb, June and Sep 2018; June 2022)
- Japanese Boxing Commission
  - 2023 Newcomer of the Year Award

== Professional boxing record ==
10 fights	8 wins	2 losses
By knockout	3	0
By decision	5	2

No.	Result	Record	Opponent	Type	Round, time	Date	Location	Notes
10	Loss	8–2	Takuma Inoue	UD	12	Sep 27, 2026	Toyota Arena Tokyo, Tokyo, Japan	For WBC bantamweight title
9	Win	8–1	Juan Francisco Estrada	RTD	9 (12), 3:00	Apr 11, 2026	Kokugikan, Tokyo, Japan	
8	Loss	7–1	Takuma Inoue	UD	12	Nov 24, 2025	Toyota Arena Tokyo, Tokyo, Japan	For vacant WBC bantamweight title
7	Win	7–0	Victor Santillan	UD	10	Jun 8, 2025	Ariake Arena, Tokyo, Japan	
6	Win	6–0	Jason Moloney	UD	10	Feb 24, 2025	Ariake Arena, Tokyo, Japan	
5	Win	5–0	Gerwin Asilo	UD	10	Oct 14, 2024	Ariake Arena, Tokyo, Japan	Won vacant WBO Asia Pacific bantamweight title
4	Win	4–0	Jonathan Rodriguez	TKO	3 (10), 1:49	Jul 20, 2024	Ryōgoku Kokugikan, Tokyo, Japan	
3	Win	3–0	Luis Robles	RTD	3 (8), 3:00	Jan 23, 2024	EDION Arena Osaka, Osaka, Japan	
2	Win	2–0	Luis Guzman	UD	8	Sep 18, 2023	Ariake Arena, Tokyo, Japan	
1	Win	1–0	Yuki Yonaha	UD	6	Apr 8, 2023	Ariake Arena, Tokyo, Japan	

== Mixed martial arts record ==
Professional record breakdown
4 matches	4 wins	0 losses
By knockout	2	0
By submission	1	0
By decision	1	0

Res.	Record	Opponent	Method	Event	Date	Round	Time	Location	Notes
Win	4–0	Yamato Fujita	Decision (unanimous)	Rizin World Grand Prix 2017: Opening Round - Part 2	October 15, 2017	3	5:00	Fukuoka, Japan	
Win	3–0	Francesco Ghigliotti	KO (head kick and punches)	Rizin 2017 in Yokohama: Sakura	April 16, 2017	1	1:07	Yokohama, Japan	
Win	2–0	Dylan Kawika Oligo	Submission (guillotine choke)	Rizin World Grand Prix 2016: Final Round	December 31, 2016	2	0:37	Tokyo, Japan	
Win	1–0	Nikita Sapun	TKO (punches)	Rizin World Grand Prix 2016: 2nd Round	December 29, 2016	1	2:47	Tokyo, Japan	Flyweight debut

== Kickboxing record ==
Professional Kickboxing record
42 Wins (28 (T)KO's), 0 Loss
Date	Result	Opponent	Event	Location	Method	Round	Time
2022-06-19	Win	(Japan) Takeru Segawa	THE MATCH 2022	Tokyo, Japan	Decision (Unanimous)	3	3:00
2022-04-02	Win	(Japan) Kazane Nagai	RISE ELDORADO 2022	Tokyo, Japan	Decision (Majority)	3	3:00
2021-09-23	Win	(Japan) Masahiko Suzuki	RISE WORLD SERIES 2021 Yokohama	Yokohama, Japan	Decision (Unanimous)	3	3:00
2021-02-28	Win	(Japan) Shiro	RISE ELDORADO 2021	Yokohama, Japan	Decision (Unanimous)	3	3:00
2020-12-31	Win	(Thailand) Kumandoi Petcharoenvit	Rizin 26 – Saitama	Saitama, Japan	Decision (Unanimous)	3	3:00
2020-11-01	Win	(Japan) Yuki	RISE DEAD OR ALIVE 2020 Osaka	Osaka, Japan	TKO (Three Knockdowns/Flying knee)	2	2:56
2020-09-27	Win	(Japan) Kouzi	Rizin 24 – Saitama	Saitama, Japan	Decision (Unanimous)	3	3:00
2020-07-12	Win	(Japan) Yuki Kasahara	Rise on Abema	Tokyo, Japan	TKO (Three knockdowns/Punches)	1	1:30
2019-12-31	Win	(Japan) Rui Ebata	Rizin 20 - Saitama	Saitama, Japan	TKO (Three knockdowns)	1	2:44
2019-09-16	Win	(Japan) Shiro	Rise World Series 2019 Final, -58 kg Tournament Final	Chiba, Japan	Decision (Unanimous)	3	3:00
Won the RISE World Series -58kg Tournament title.
2019-07-21	Win	(Thailand) Suakim PK Saenchaimuaythaigym	Rise World Series 2019 Semi Finals, -58 kg Tournament Semi Final	Osaka, Japan	TKO (Doctor stop/Rolling thunder)	3	1:25
2019-06-02	Win	(Argentina) Martin Blanco	Rizin 16 - Kobe	Kobe, Japan	TKO (Three knockdowns)	2	2:19
Won the vacant ISKA Featherweight (57 kg) World Championship.
2019-04-29	Win	(Philippines) Fritz Biagtan	Rizin 15 - Yokohama	Yokohama, Japan	TKO (Three knockdowns)	3	1:25
2019-03-10	Win	(Argentina) Federico Roma	Rise World Series 2019 First Round, -58 kg Tournament Quarter Final	Tokyo, Japan	KO (Cartwheel kick)	3	1:35
2018-11-17	Win	(Japan) Taiki Naito	RISE 129	Saitama, Japan	TKO (Three knockdowns)	1	1:58
2018-09-30	Win	(Japan) Kyoji Horiguchi	Rizin FF 13	Saitama, Japan	Decision (Unanimous)	3	3:00
2018-06-17	Win	(Thailand) Rodtang Jitmuangnon	RISE 125	Chiba, Japan	Ext.R Decision (Unanimous)	6	3:00
Won the inaugural RISE Featherweight (57.5 kg) World Championship.
2018-05-06	Win	(Japan) Yusaku Nakamura	Rizin FF 10	Fukuoka, Japan	TKO (Referee stoppage)	2	4:42
2018-02-12	Win	(Thailand) Suakim Sit Sor Thor Taew	KNOCK OUT First Impact	Tokyo, Japan	Decision (Unanimous)	5	3:00
2017-12-31	Win	(Japan) Yamato Fujita	Rizin World Grand Prix 2017: Final Round, Tournament Final	Saitama, Japan	TKO (Three knockdowns)	1	1:27
Won the 2017 Rizin Flyweight (57 kg) Kickboxing Tournament title.
2017-12-31	Win	(Japan) Yuta Hamamoto	Rizin World Grand Prix 2017: Final Round, Tournament Semifinal	Saitama, Japan	KO (Flying knee)	2	4:58
2017-11-23	Win	(Argentina) Ignacio Capllonch	RISE 121	Tokyo, Japan	TKO (punches)	3	1:15
2017-08-20	Win	(Thailand) Visanlek Meibukai	KNOCK OUT Vol. 4	Tokyo, Japan	TKO (Doctor stoppage)	3	2:28
2017-05-20	Win	(Republic of Ireland) Ryan Sheehan	RISE 117	Tokyo, Japan	KO (left hook to the body)	1	1:12
Defends the ISKA Oriental Rules Bantamweight (55 kg) World Championship.
2017-02-12	Win	(Thailand) Amnat Ruenroeng	KNOCK OUT Vol. 1	Tokyo, Japan	KO (Left hook to the body)	4	2:39
2016-12-05	Win	(Thailand) Wanchalong PK.Saenchai	KNOCK OUT Vol. 0	Tokyo, Japan	KO (Spinning back kick)	1	0:38
2016-09-25	Win	(Japan) Yuta Murakoshi	RISE 113	Tokyo, Japan	Decision (majority)	5	3:00
Defends the RISE Bantamweight (55 kg) Championship.
2016-08-07	Win	(China) Lin Bin	Kunlun Fight 49 / Rebels 45	Tokyo, Japan	KO (Left knee to the body)	1	1:10
2016-05-29	Win	(Morocco) Tarek Totts	RISE 111	Tokyo, Japan	KO (Left Kick to the Body)	2	1:49
2016-03-26	Win	(Portugal) Frederico Cordeiro	RISE 110	Tokyo, Japan	Decision (Unanimous)	5	3:00
Won the vacant ISKA Oriental Rules Bantamweight (55 kg) World Championship.
2016-03-12	Win	(Japan) Keisuke Miyamoto	No Kick No Life 2016	Tokyo, Japan	KO (Left knee to the body)	2	0:26
2016-01-31	Win	(Greece) Manolis Kalistis	RISE 109	Tokyo, Japan	Decision (Unanimous)	3	3:00
2015-11-08	Win	(France) Mike Alamos	RISE 108	Tokyo, Japan	KO (Left Knee to the Body)	1	1:56
2015-08-01	Win	(Japan) Taiki Naito	BLADE 2 –55 kg Tournament - Final	Tokyo, Japan	TKO (Three knockdowns)	1	1:41
Won the 2015 Blade Japan Cup (55 kg) Tournament.
2015-08-01	Win	(Japan) Yukinori Ogasawara	BLADE 2 –55 kg Tournament - Semi Finals	Tokyo, Japan	KO (Left hook)	3	0:44
2015-08-01	Win	(Japan) Masahiko Suzuki	Blade.2 –55 kg Tournament - Quarter Finals	Tokyo, Japan	TKO (Two knockdowns)	1	1:31
2015-05-31	Win	(Japan) Yuta Murakoshi	RISE 105	Tokyo, Japan	TKO (punches)	2	1:31
Won the RISE Bantamweight (55 kg) Championship.
2015-03-21	Win	(Japan) Masahiro Fujimoto	RISE 104	Tokyo, Japan	TKO (Punches)	1	2:06
2014-12-29	Win	(South Korea) Kim Jin Min	BLADE 1	Tokyo, Japan	KO (Knee to the Body)	1	1:40
2014-11-16	Win	(Japan) Makoto Kushima	RISE 102	Tokyo, Japan	Decision (unanimous)	3	3:00
2014-09-28	Win	(Brazil) Aleksandro Hideo	RISE 101	Tokyo, Japan	KO (left knee to the body)	1	2:42
2014-07-12	Win	(Japan) Tomo Arimatsu	RISE 100 ~ Blade 0 ~	Tokyo, Japan	KO (High Kick)	1	0:58
Legend: Win Loss Draw/No contest Notes

=== Amateur record ===
Amateur Kickboxing record (Incomplete)
99 Wins (37 (T) KO's), 5 Losses, 3 Draws
Date	Result	Opponent	Event	Location	Method	Round	Time
2013-10-13	Win	(Japan) Shinnosuke Nakamura	BigBang Amateur 17, Final	Tokyo, Japan	N/A	3	2:00
2013-10-13	Win	(Japan) Kazutaka Sasazaki	BigBang Amateur 17, Semi Final	Tokyo, Japan	N/A	2	2:00
2013-03-31	Win	(Japan) Ryoga Hirano	2013 All Japan Jr. Kick Tournament, Final	Tokyo, Japan	KO (punches)	1	0:42
Wins the 2013 All Japan Jr. Kick -55kg title.
2013-03-31	Win	(Japan) Taio Asahisa	2013 All Japan Jr. Kick Tournament, Semi Final	Tokyo, Japan	Decision	2	2:00
2013-03-31	Win	(Japan) Kyoto Takahashi	2013 All Japan Jr. Kick Tournament, Quarter Final	Tokyo, Japan	TKO	2	N/A
2013-02-16	Draw	(Japan) Eisaku Ogasawara	Kichijoji Fight Club	Tokyo, Japan	Decision	3	2:00
2012-12-02	Win	(Thailand) Kaogam Sor Tantip	RISE/M-1 MC ～INFINITY～	Tokyo, Japan	KO (punches)	1	0:42
2012-11-11	Win	(Japan) Hiroto Ishizuka	Bigbang the future V	Tokyo, Japan	N/A	N/A	N/A
Wins the Bigbang -50kg title.
2012-10-21	Win	(Japan) Rasta Kido	Muay Lok 2012 3rd	Tokyo, Japan	Decision	2	2:00
2012-09-09	Win	(Japan) Yoshiki Tane	M-1 Challenge Sutt Yod Muaythai vol.3	Tokyo, Japan	TKO (referee stop/left hook)	2	0:08
2012-09-02	Win	(Japan) Yugo Tsuboi	BigBang 10	Tokyo, Japan	Decision	3	2:00
2012-08-26	Win	(Japan) Teruyo Sasaki	M-1 Muay Thai Challenge Amateur	Chiba, Japan	Decision	3	2:00
Won the M-1 Junior -50kg title.
2012-07-22	Win	(Japan) Teruyo Sasaki	M-1 Muay Thai Challenge Amateur Tournament, Final	Tokyo, Japan	Decision	2	2:00
2012-07-22	Win	(Japan) Daigo Sunaga	M-1 Muay Thai Challenge Amateur Tournament, Semi Final	Tokyo, Japan	Decision	2	2:00
2012-07-16	Win	(Japan) Yuzuki Sakai	BigBang Amateur 7	Tokyo, Japan	Decision	2	1:30
2012-07-16	Win	(Japan) Kota Nakano	BigBang Amateur 7	Tokyo, Japan	Decision	2	1:30
2012-06-03	Win	(Japan) Haruma Saikyo	BigBang	Tokyo, Japan	Decision	3	2:00
2012-05-27	Loss	(Japan) Junya Weerasakreck	M-1 Muay Thai Challenge Amateur	Japan	Decision	3	2:00
For the M-1 Junior -50kg title.
2012-04-22	Win	(Japan) Kenta Yoshinaga	M-1 Amateur Event	Tokyo, Japan	Decision	N/A	N/A
2012-04-15	Win	(Japan) Kaito Hayashi	2012 All Japan Jr. Kick Tournament, Final	Tokyo, Japan	TKO	2	N/A
Wins the 2012 All Japan Jr. Kick -50kg title.
2012-04-15	Win	(Japan) N/A	2012 All Japan Jr. Kick Tournament, Semi Final	Tokyo, Japan	Decision	2	2:00
2012-04-15	Win	(Japan) Taio Asahisa	2012 All Japan Jr. Kick Tournament, Quarter Final	Tokyo, Japan	Decision	2	2:00
2012-03-04	Win	(Japan) Yugo Tsuboi	2012 All Japan Jr. Kick Kanto Area Selection Tournament, Final	Tokyo, Japan	Decision	3	2:00
2012-03-04	Win	(Japan) Junya Weerasakreck	2012 All Japan Jr. Kick Kanto Area Selection Tournament, Semi Final	Tokyo, Japan	Decision	2	2:00
2012-03-04	Win	(Japan) Ryosuke Kumai	2012 All Japan Jr. Kick Kanto Area Selection Tournament, Quarter Final	Tokyo, Japan	Decision	2	2:00
2012-02-25	Draw	(Japan) Yoshiki Takei	Bigbang 8	Tokyo, Japan	Decision	3	2:00
2011-12-11	Win	(Japan) Hiroto Ishizuka	M-1 Muay Thai Amateur 47	Tokyo, Japan	Decision	3	2:00
Defends the M-1 Junior -45kg title.
2011-11-20	Win	(Japan) Yuya Iwanami	MA Japan Kick BREAK-20 - RAISE -	Tokyo, Japan	Decision	2	1:30
Defends the MA Kick Junior -42kg title.
2011-10-23	Win	(Japan) Jin Aso	DEEP☆KICK 8	Osaka, Japan	Decision	2	2:00
2011-10-02	Win	(Japan) Azuki Seno	Muay Lok 2011 4th	Japan	Decision	2	2:00
2011-09-11	Win	(Japan) Katsuki Nogami	M-1 Freshmans vol. 3	Tokyo, Japan	Decision	3	2:00
Defends the M-1 Junior -45kg title.
2011-07-18	Win	(Japan) Haruma Saikyo	MA Kick BREAK-16 - GRASP	Tokyo, Japan	Decision	3	1:30
Defends the MA Kick Junior -42kg title.
2011-06-19	Win	(Japan) Junya Weerasakreck	M-1 FAIRTEX SINGHA BEER Muay thai Challenge	Tokyo, Japan	Decision	2	3:00
Wins the M-1 Junior -45kg title.
2011-06-12	Win	(Japan) Junya Weerasakreck	M-1 Freshmans NEXT HEROS CUP 2011 vol. 2	Tokyo, Japan	Decision	3	2:00
2011-04-24	Win	(Japan) Haruma Saikyo	MA Kick BREAK-12 - It starts -	Tokyo, Japan	Decision	3	1:30
Wins the MA Kick Junior -42kg title.
2011-04-17	Win	(Japan) Yuuichi Suenaga	JAKF	Tokyo, Japan	Decision	2	1:30
2011-04-03	Win	(Japan) Teruyo Sasaki	M-1 Muay Thai Amateur 41 ～M-1 Kid's CHAMPION CARNIVAL 2011 1st～	Saitama, Japan	Decision		
Defends M-1 Amateur -40kg title.
2011-04-02	Win	(Japan) Kaito Fukuda	Muay Lok 2011 2nd	Tokyo, Japan	Decision	2	2:00
2011-02-20	Win	(Japan) Saya Ito	Muay Lok 2011 1st	Tokyo, Japan	Decision	2	2:00
2010-12-19	Win	(Japan) Tatsuya Sakakibara	KAMINARIMON, -40 kg Championship Tournament Final	Tokyo, Japan	Decision (Unanimous)	3	2:00
Wins KAMINARIMON Junior -40kg title.
2010-12-10	Win	(Japan) Yuichi Suenaga	M-1 Muay Thai Amateur 39	Tokyo, Japan	Decision (Unanimous)	3	2:00
Defends M-1 Junior -40kg title.
2010-10-31	Win	(Japan) Kota Nakano	KAMINARIMON	Tokyo, Japan	Forfeit		
2010-10-31	Win	(Japan) Kazutomi Uchida	KAMINARIMON	Tokyo, Japan	TKO	1	N/A
2010-10-31	Draw	(Japan) Tatsuya Sakakibara	KAMINARIMON, -40 kg Championship Tournament	Tokyo, Japan	Decision	1	2:00
2010-10-02	Loss	(Japan) Ren Hiramoto	New ☆ square jungle	Tokyo, Japan	Decision	3	2:00
2010-08-29	Win	(Japan) Katsuki Nogami	M-1 Muay Thai Amateur 36 - M-1 Kid's CHAMPION CARNIVAL 2010 2nd	Tokyo, Japan	Decision (Unanimous)	3	2:00
Wins M-1 Junior -40kg title.
2010-08-01	Win	(Japan) Saya Ito	Muay Lok Junior 35 kg Tournament, Final	Tokyo, Japan	Decision (Unanimous)	3	2:00
Wins the Muay Lok -35kg title.
2010-07-11	Win	(Japan) Yuichi Suenaga	M-1 Muay Thai Amateur 35, Final	Tokyo, Japan	Decision		
2010-07-11	Win	(Japan) Yoshiki Takei	M-1 Muay Thai Amateur 35, Semi Final	Tokyo, Japan	Decision		
2010-06-13	Loss	(Thailand) Onree Isaanronb	Muay Thai WINDY Super Fight Vol. 3	Tokyo, Japan	Decision (Majority)	3	2:00
2010-04-25	Win	(Japan) Keigo Nakura	Muay Lok 2010 2nd	Tokyo, Japan	TKO (Punches)	2	1:40
2010-03-14	Win	(Japan) Tora Wor.Wanchai	Muay Thai WINDY Super Fight Vol. 2	Tokyo, Japan	Decision (Unanimous)	5	2:00
2010-01-17	Win	(Japan) Koki Yamada	Muay Lok Junior 1	Tokyo, Japan	Decision		
Legend: Win Loss Draw/No contest Notes

== Exhibition kickboxing record ==
1 fight	1 win	0 losses
By decision	1	0

Date	Result	Opponent	Event	Location	Method	Round	Time	Notes
2018-05-26	Win	(Japan) Keisuke Monguchi	ABEMA TV "VS Tenshin Nasukawa"	Tokyo, Japan	Decision (Unanimous)	3	2:00	

== Exhibition boxing record ==
6 fights	0 wins	1 loss
By knockout	0	1
Non-scored	5	

No.	Result	Record	Opponent	Type	Round, time	Date	Location	Notes
6	—N/a	0–1 (5)	Takanori Gomi	—N/a	2	Dec 31, 2021	Saitama Super Arena, Saitama, Japan	
5	—N/a	0–1 (4)	Koki Osaki; Hiroya; Hideo Tokoro	—N/a	3	June 13, 2021	Tokyo Dome, Tokyo, Japan	Each opponent fought one round. Special Standing Bout (boxing rules with superman punch and spinning back fist allowed)
4	—N/a	0–1 (3)	Koki Kameda	—N/a	3	June 22, 2019	Tokyo, Japan	
3	—N/a	0–1 (2)	Yoshiki Fujisaki	—N/a	3	May 18, 2019	Tokyo, Japan	
2	—N/a	0–1 (1)	Tepparith Kokietgym	—N/a	3	May 18, 2019	Tokyo, Japan	
1	Loss	0–1	Floyd Mayweather Jr.	TKO	1 (3), 2:20	Dec 31, 2018	Saitama Super Arena, Saitama, Japan	

== Pay-per-view bouts ==
Japan
No.	Date	Fight	Billing	Buys	Network	Revenue
1	19 June 2022	Nasukawa vs. Takeru	THE MATCH 2022	500,000	Abema	$25 million

== See also ==
- List of current Rizin FF fighters
- List of male kickboxers
- List of male mixed martial artists
