= Masahide Kudo =

Japanese male professional kickboxer

- Born: 24 May 1991 (age 35); Takasaki, Japan
- Native name: 工藤政英
- Other names: Crazy Rabbit
- Nationality: Japanese
- Height: 172 cm (5 ft 8 in)
- Weight: 57.5 kg (127 lb; 9 st 1 lb)
- Division: Super Flyweight
- Style: Kickboxing
- Stance: Orthodox
- Fighting out of: Tokyo, Japan
- Team: Shinjuku Lefty Gym

Kickboxing record
- Total: 37
- Wins: 22
- By knockout: 14
- Losses: 11
- By knockout: 4
- Draws: 4

Masahide Kudo (工藤政英, born 24 May 1991) is a Japanese retired kickboxer who competed in the featherweight division of RISE, where he was champion. A professional competitor since 2013, he was also a former REBELS Super Bantamweight champion.

As of August 2021, he was the #4 ranked Super Flyweight in the world, according to Combat Press.

== Kickboxing career ==
=== Early career ===
Kudo made his professional debut against Takuya Fujii at Kikken IX Part.2 on 17 February 2013. He won the fight by a second-round technical knockout. He would go on to amass a 3–3 record over the course of his first year as a professional fighter.

Kudo was scheduled to face Shunta Aragaki at REBELS.23 on 26 January 2014. He won the fight by a third-round technical knockout, beginning a seven-fight winning streak that would culminate in a REBELS title fight.

=== REBELS Super Bantamweight champion ===
==== Super Bantamweight tournament ====
Kudo participated in the REBELS super bantamweight tournament, held to determine the new champion. He was scheduled to face the DEEP KICK 55 kg champion Masahiko Suzuki in the semifinals at REBELS.33 on 25 January 2015. Kudo won the fight by split decision, after an extra round was fought. Kudo faced Takeo Oode in the tournament final, held at REBELS.36 on 10 May 2015. He won the bout by unanimous decision, with scores of 49–48, 49–47 and 50–45.

==== Title reign ====
Kudo was scheduled to face Taiki Naito in the quarterfinals of the BLADE FC 2 Japan Cup, on 1 August 2015. He lost to the eventual finalist by a first-round knockout.

Kudo was scheduled to make his first title defense against Shuto Miyazaki at Rebels.42 on 3 April 2016. He won the fight by a third-round technical knockout, through repeated body shots.

Kudo made his RISE debut against Yugo Tsuboi at Rise 111 on 29 May 2016. He won the fight by a first-round technical knockout.

Kudo was scheduled to face Keisuke Miyamoto at REBELS.45 in the Kunlun Fight and REBELS cross-promotional event. The fight was ruled a majority draw, with of the three judges scoring the bout 29–28 for Miyamoto.

Kudo was scheduled to make his last appearance with REBELS against Eisaku Ogasawara at REBELS.46 on 23 October 2016. Kudo lost by a first-round knockout.

=== RISE ===
Kudo was scheduled to face the #5 ranked RISE featherweight Takanobu Sano at Rise 116 on 5 March 2017. Kudo knocked Sano down twice in the second round of the bout, first time with a left hook, while the second was from a combination of punches. The referee stopped the bout after the second knockdown, as Sano was unable to continue.

Kudo was scheduled to face the #3 ranked RISE featherweight Yoshihisa Morimoto at Rise 117 on 20 May 2017. The fight was ruled a majority draw after the first three rounds were fought, with one of the three judges scoring the fight 29–28 for Morimoto. The bout was ruled a unanimous decision draw after an extra round was fought, with all three judges scoring it an even 10–10.

Kudo was scheduled to face the #1 ranked RISE featherweight Yuta Murakoshi at Rise 118 on 17 July 2017. Murakoshi won the fight by majority decision, with scores of 30–30, 30–28 and 30–28.

==== 2017 Dead or Alive Tournament ====
Kudo participated in the 2017 RISE Dead or Alive tournament, held at Rise 121 on 23 November 2017, with a ¥2 million prize for the tournament winner. Kudo was scheduled to face Ken Flyskygym in the tournament quarterfinal. He won the fight by a first-round technical knockout, needing a little less than 90 seconds to knock Ken down twice. Kudo advanced to the semifinals, where he faced the tournament favorite Taiki Naito. Kudo lost to the eventual tournament winner by unanimous decision, with scores of 30–28, 30–27 and 30–27.

=== RISE Featherweight champion ===
==== RISE featherweight tournament ====
Kudo took part in a four-man tournament, organized to crown the new featherweight champion. He was scheduled to face Tatsuki Shinotsuka in what was Shinotsuka's second professional appearance. The second semifinal pairing was contested by the #6 ranked RISE featherweight Shuto Miyazaki and the #1 ranked Yoshihisa Morimoto. Kudo won the semifinal bout by a second-round technical knockout, scoring all three knockdowns through repeated low kicks. Kudo fought a rematch with Yoshihisa Morimoto in the tournament finals, held at Rise 125 on 17 June 2018. He won the fight by unanimous decision.

==== Title reign ====
Kudo was scheduled to face Shiro at Rise 129 on 17 November 2018. Shiro won the fight by unanimous decision, with all three judges scoring the bout 30–29 in his favor.

Kudo made his ONE Championship debut against the former Lumpinee Stadium bantamweight champion Petchdam Petchyindee Academy at ONE Championship: Call to Greatness on 22 February 2019. He lost the fight by a second-round knockout.

Kudo was scheduled to face Tarik Totts at RISE 132 on 19 May 2019. He won the fight by a second-round body kick knockout.

Kudo was scheduled to face Thalisson Gomes Ferreira at RISE WORLD SERIES 2019 Semi-Final Round in OSAKA on 21 July 2019. He won the fight by majority decision, with scores of 29–28, 28–28 and 29–28.

Kudo made his second ONE Championship appearance against Panpayak Jitmuangnon at ONE Championship: Immortal Triumph on 6 September 2019. He lost the fight by unanimous decision.

Kudo was scheduled to face Ryo Takahashi at Rise 145 on 19 July 2020. The fight was ruled a majority draw after the first three rounds were contested, with one of the judges giving Kudo a 30–29 scorecard. The fight was once again ruled a majority draw after an extra round was fought.

Kudo was scheduled to fight the WBC Muaythai Japan featherweight champion Takuma Ota at Rise 145 on 30 January 2021. He won the fight by unanimous decision, with all three judges scoring the bout 30–28 in his favor.

Kudo was scheduled to face Kanta Tabuchi at Rise 148 on 17 April 2021. He won the fight by unanimous decision.

Kudo was scheduled to make his first RISE featherweight title defense against the #1 ranked featherweight contender Masaki Takeuchi at Rise 151 on 28 July 2021. It was Kudo's first title fight since winning the championship on 17 June 2018. Kudo won the fight by a first-round technical knockout, successfully knocking Takeuchi down three times in less than two minutes.

On 11 December 2021 Kudo announced his retirement after suffering a nose injury deemed inoperable.

== Championships and accomplishments ==
- RISE
  - RISE Featherweight Championship (One successful title defense)
- REBELS
  - 2015 REBELS Super Bantamweight (-55kg) championship (One successful title defense)

== Fight record ==
Kickboxing record
22 Wins (14 (T)KO's), 11 Losses, 4 Draw, 0 No Contest
Date	Result	Opponent	Event	Location	Method	Round	Time
2021-07-28	Win	(Japan) Masaki Takeuchi	Rise 151	Bunkyo, Tokyo, Japan	TKO (3 Knockdowns/Punches)	1	1:43
Defends the RISE Featherweight championship.
2021-04-17	Win	(Japan) Kanta Tabuchi	Rise 148	Bunkyo, Tokyo, Japan	Decision (Unanimous)	3	3:00
2021-01-30	Win	(Japan) Takuma Ota	Rise 145	Bunkyo, Tokyo, Japan	Decision (Unanimous)	3	3:00
2020-07-19	Draw	(Japan) Ryo Takahashi	Rise 145	Bunkyo, Tokyo, Japan	Ext. R. Decision (Split)	4	3:00
2019-09-06	Loss	(Thailand) Panpayak Jitmuangnon	ONE Championship: Immortal Triumph	Kallang, Singapore	Decision (Unanimous)	3	3:00
2019-07-21	Win	(Brazil) Thalisson Gomes Ferreira	RISE WORLD SERIES 2019 Semi-Final Round in OSAKA	Osaka, Japan	Decision (Majority)	3	3:00
2019-05-19	Win	(Italy) Tarik Totts	RISE 132	Tokyo, Japan	KO (Right body kick)	2	2:32
2019-02-22	Loss	(Thailand) Petchdam Petchyindee Academy	ONE Championship: Call to Greatness	Kallang, Singapore	KO (Punch)	2	0:35
2018-11-17	Loss	(Japan) Shiro	Rise 129	Tokyo, Japan	Decision (Unanimous)	3	3:00
2018-06-17	Win	(Japan) Yoshihisa Morimoto	Rise 125, Tournament Final	Chiba, Japan	Decision (Unanimous)	5	3:00
Wins the vacant RISE Featherweight championship.
2018-03-24	Win	(Japan) Tatsuki Shinotsuka	Rise 123, Tournament Semifinal	Tokyo, Japan	TKO (Three knockdown rule)	2	1:34
2017-11-23	Loss	(Japan) Taiki Naito	Rise 121, Tournament Semifinal	Tokyo, Japan	Decision (Unanimous)	3	3:00
2017-11-23	Win	(Japan) Ken Flyskygym	Rise 121, Tournament Quarterfinal	Tokyo, Japan	TKO (Two knockdown rule)	1	1:27
2017-07-17	Loss	(Japan) Yuta Murakoshi	Rise 118	Bunkyo, Tokyo, Japan	Decision (Majority)	3	3:00
2017-05-20	Loss	(Japan) Yoshihisa Morimoto	Rise 117	Bunkyo, Tokyo, Japan	Ext. R. Decision (Unanimous)	4	3:00
2017-03-05	Win	(Japan) Takanobu Sano	Rise 116	Bunkyo, Tokyo, Japan	TKO (Punches)	2	2:43
2016-10-23	Loss	(Japan) Eisaku Ogasawara	REBELS.46	Tokyo, Japan	KO (Right hook)	1	0:43
2016-08-07	Draw	(Japan) Keisuke Miyamoto	KUNLUN FIGHT 49×REBELS.45	Tokyo, Japan	Decision (Majority)	3	3:00
2016-05-29	Win	(Japan) Yugo Tsuboi	Rise 111	Bunkyo, Tokyo, Japan	TKO (Punches)	1	2:39
2016-04-03	Win	(Japan) Shuto Miyazaki	Rebels.42	Tokyo, Japan	TKO (Body shots)	3	0:55
Defends the REBELS Super Bantamweight championship.
2016-01-24	Draw	(Japan) Yuta "Cat" Hamamoto	Rebels.40	Tokyo, Japan	Decision (Majority)	3	3:00
2015-08-01	Loss	(Japan) Taiki Naito	BLADE FIGHTING CHAMPIONSHIP 2 JAPAN CUP −55 kg, Quarter Finals	Ota, Tokyo, Japan	KO (Right hook)	1	1:53
2015-05-10	Win	(Japan) Takeo Oode	REBELS.36, Tournament Final	Tokyo, Japan	Decision (Unanimous)	5	3:00
Wins the REBELS Super Bantamweight championship.
2015-01-25	Win	(Japan) Masahiko Suzuki	REBELS.33, Tournament Semifinal	Tokyo, Japan	Ext.R Decision (Split)	4	3:00
2014-12-23	Win	(Japan) Yusuke Deguchi	REBELS.32	Tokyo, Japan	KO (Right hook)	2	2:13
2014-10-26	Win	(Japan) Nobuhita Shiraoka	REBELS.31	Tokyo, Japan	KO (Left hook)	2	0:30
2014-07-27	Win	(Japan) Masahito Sato	J-NETWORK J-FIGHT in SHINJUKU～vol.38～	Tokyo, Japan	Decision (Unanimous)	3	3:00
2014-04-20	Win	(Japan) Atsushi Tateshima	REBELS.26 ～the duel～	Tokyo, Japan	KO	1	1:36
2014-03-16	Win	(Japan) KO-HEI	REBELS.25 a.k.a. INNOVATION's day	Tokyo, Japan	KO	2	2:15
2014-01-26	Win	(Japan) Shunta Aragaki	REBELS.23	Tokyo, Japan	KO	3	1:22
2013-10-14	Loss	(Japan) Ryoma Hasumi	M-FIGHT～Shuken 13～Part.1	Tokyo, Japan	KO	1	0:47
2013-09-01	Loss	(Japan) Hiro P.K. Saenchai Muaythaigym	M-FIGHT～Shuken XII×Legend of Daddy 3	Tokyo, Japan	Decision (Split)	3	3:00
2013-07-21	Win	(Japan) Kengo Asano	M-FIGHT Muaylok 2013 -2nd-	Tokyo, Japan	KO	1	2:49
2013-06-09	Win	(Japan) Yukinori Ogasawara	TNK1 feat.REBELS	Gunma, Japan	KO	1	2:49
2013-04-28	Loss	(Japan) Hiro P.K. Saenchai Muaythaigym	Muay Lok 2013 1st	Tokyo, Japan	Decision (Unanimous)	1	1:53
2013-02-17	Win	(Japan) Takuya Fujii	Kikken IX Part.2	Tokyo, Japan	TKO (Punches)	2	1:09
Legend: Win Loss Draw/No contest Notes

== See also ==
- List of male kickboxers
