= Taiki Naito =

Japanese kickboxer

- Born: January 13, 1996 (age 30); Aichi Prefecture, Japan
- Height: 170 cm (5 ft 7 in)
- Weight: 61.2 kg (134.9 lb; 9.6 st)
- Division: Bantamweight
- Style: Kickboxing, Muay Thai
- Stance: Orthodox
- Fighting out of: Tokyo, Japan
- Team: BELLWOOD FIGHT TEAM
- Years active: 2011–present

Kickboxing record
- Total: 54
- Wins: 40
- By knockout: 12
- Losses: 14
- By knockout: 3

Taiki Naito (内藤 大樹, Naito Taiki; born January 13, 1996) is a Japanese kickboxer, currently signed with ONE Championship. He is the former Shoot boxing Super Bantamweight champion.

== Kickboxing career ==
=== SHOOTBOXING ===
Naito made his professional debut against Hikaru Kawano in July 2011. He won the fight by unanimous decision. Naito won 13 of his next 15 fights, before being scheduled to fight a rematch with one of the two men who had defeated him, Kazuyuki Fushimi, for the SHOOT BOXING Japan Super Bantamweight title. He defeated Fushimi by knockout in the fourth round.

Naito won his next three fights, before taking part in the BLADE FC 55 kg tournament, held during BLADE FC 2. In the quarterfinal, he knocked Masahide Kudo out with a right hook in the first round. In the semifinals, he defeated Yuta Murakoshi by unanimous decision. In the tournament final, he faced the pound for pound great Tenshin Nasukawa. Nasukawa won the fight by TKO in the first round, managing to knock Naito down three times in the first round.

He then won his next two shootboxing fights against Yukinori Ogasawara and Takanobu Sano, before losing a muay thai rules bout against Eisaku Ogasawara. He defended his Shootboxing title with a third round knockout of Seiki Ueyama.

He won two more shootboxing bouts, before unsuccessfully challenging for the Shootboxing Featherweight title held at the time by Kazuki Fukada, losing by majority decision at SHOOT BOXING 2017 act.3. In his next fight, he defended his super bantamweight title, winning the rematch with Seiki Ueyama by unanimous decision.

=== RISE DoA Tournament ===
After these two title fights, Naito participated in the 2017 RISE DEAD or Alive −57 kg tournament. In the quarterfinals, he faced Kento Haraguchi. Their fight went into an extra round, after which Naito won a decision. Moving on to the semifinals, Naito defeated Masahide Kudo by unanimous decision. He won the tournament, with a fourth round knockout of MOMOTARO.

At RISE 129, Naito fought a rematch with Tenshin Nasukawa. Nasukawa would dominate, as he did in their first fight, again dropping Naito thrice in the first round, winning by TKO.

=== ONE Championship ===
Naito made his ONE Championship debut against Alexi Serepisos at ONE Championship: Dawn Of Valor. He won the fight by a third round TKO. In his next fight, he faced Rui Botelho, whom he defeated by unanimous decision. In his third ONE fight, Naito fought Savvas Michael, winning the fight by unanimous decision.

He fought in a ONE main event for the first time at ONE Championship: Big Bang 2, when he fought the former ONE Flyweight Muay Thai World Champion Jonathan Haggerty. Haggerty won the fight by unanimous decision, dropping Naito in both the first and the second round.

Naito was scheduled to fight Wang Wenfeng at ONE: Full Blast 2. Naito won the fight by unanimous decision, landing numerous leg kicks on his opponent throughout the three round bout.

Naito faced Petchdam Petchyindee Academy at ONE Championship: Revolution on September 24, 2021. He won the close bout via split decision.

Naito was booked to face Superlek Kiatmuu9 in the quarterfinals of the ONE Flyweight Muay Thai World Grand Prix at ONE 157 on May 20, 2022. He lost the bout via unanimous decision and was eliminated from the grand prix.

Naito faced Amir Naseri in a muay thai rules bout at ONE on Prime Video 3 on October 22, 2022. He won the fight by unanimous decision.

Naito faced Elias Mahmoudi on August 3, 2024, at ONE Fight Night 24. He lost the fight via knockout in round three.

On April 29, 2026, Naito faced the undefeated Hyu Iwata at ONE Samurai 1 and defeated him by unanimous decision.

== Titles and accomplishments ==
- RISE
  - 2017 RISE Dead or Alive -57 kg Tournament Winner
- BLADE Fighting Championship
  - 2015 BLADE Japan Cup -55 kg runner-up
- Shoot Boxing
  - 2014 Shoot Boxing Japan Super Bantamweight Champion
    - Two successful title defenses

== Fight record ==
Kickboxing & Muay Thai record
40 Wins (12 (T)KO's), 14 Losses
Date	Result	Opponent	Event	Location	Method	Round	Time
2026-11-07	Win	(Thailand) Kongthoranee Sor.Sommai	ONE Fight Night 49	Bangkok, Thailand	Decision (Unanimous)	3	3:00
2026-04-29	Win	(Japan) Hyu Iwata	ONE Samurai 1	Tokyo, Japan	Decision (Unanimous)	3	3:00
2025-11-07	Win	(Thailand) Nakrob Fairtex	ONE Fight Night 37	Bangkok, Thailand	KO (Right hook)	1	2:30
2025-06-07	Win	(Colombia) Johan Estupiñan	ONE Fight Night 32	Bangkok, Thailand	Decision (Majority)	3	3:00
2024-08-03	Loss	(Algeria) Elias Mahmoudi	ONE Fight Night 24	Bangkok, Thailand	KO (Spinning backfist)	3	2:56
2024-04-06	Loss	(Thailand) Dedduanglek Tded99	ONE Fight Night 21	Bangkok, Thailand	Decision (Unanimous)	3	3:00
2024-03-15	Win	(Kyrgyzstan) Sherzod Kabutov	ONE Friday Fights 55, Lumpinee Stadium	Bangkok, Thailand	Decision (Unanimous)	3	3:00
2023-10-20	Loss	(Thailand) Kongthoranee Sor.Sommai	ONE Friday Fights 37, Lumpinee Stadium	Bangkok, Thailand	Decision (Unanimous)	3	3:00
2023-07-21	Loss	(Thailand) Dedduanglek Tded99	ONE Friday Fights 26, Lumpinee Stadium	Bangkok, Thailand	Decision (Unanimous)	3	3:00
2022-10-22	Win	(Iran) Amir Naseri	ONE on Prime Video 3	Kuala Lumpur, Malaysia	Decision (Unanimous)	3	3:00
2022-05-20	Loss	(Thailand) Superlek Kiatmuu9	ONE 157	Kallang, Singapore	Decision (Unanimous)	3	3:00
ONE Muay Thai Flyweight Grand Prix Quarter Final
2021-09-24	Win	(Thailand) Petchdam Petchyindee Academy	ONE Championship: Revolution	Kallang, Singapore	Decision (Split)	3	3:00
2021-06-11	Win	(China) Wang Wenfeng	ONE Championship: Full Blast 2	Kallang, Singapore	Decision (Unanimous)	3	3:00
2020-12-04	Loss	(United Kingdom) Jonathan Haggerty	ONE Championship: Big Bang 2	Kallang, Singapore	Decision (Unanimous)	3	3:00
2020-02-07	Win	(Cyprus) Savvas Michael	ONE Championship: Warrior's Code	Jakarta, Indonesia	Decision (Unanimous)	3	3:00
2019-12-09	Win	(Portugal) Rui Botelho	ONE Championship: Mark Of Greatness	Kuala Lumpur, Malaysia	Decision (Unanimous)	3	3:00
2019-10-26	Win	(New Zealand) Alexi Serepisos	ONE Championship: Dawn Of Valor	Jakarta, Indonesia	TKO (Referee Stoppage)	3	2:45
2019-09-01	Win	(Japan) Yuta Watanabe	ONE Japan Series: Road to Century	Tokyo, Japan	KO (Right High Kick)	1	1:22
2019-06-23	Loss	(Japan) Hiroki Kasahara	Shoot Boxing 2019 act.3	Tokyo, Japan	2nd Ext.R Decision (Majority)	5	3:00
2018-11-17	Loss	(Japan) Tenshin Nasukawa	RISE 129	Saitama, Japan	TKO (3 knockdowns)	1	1:58
2018-08-12	Win	(Japan) Hannya Hashimoto	Rizin 12 – Nagoya	Nagoya, Japan	TKO (leg kicks)	2	1:53
2017-11-23	Win	(Japan) MOMOTARO	RISE 121 - DEAD or ALIVE -57 kg Tournament, Final	Tokyo, Japan	Ext.R KO (Left Straight)	4	0:58
Wins RISE DEAD or Alive −57kg Tournament title
2017-11-23	Win	(Japan) Masahide Kudo	RISE 121 - DEAD or ALIVE -57 kg Tournament, Semi Final	Tokyo, Japan	Decision (Unanimous)	3	3:00
2017-11-23	Win	(Japan) Kento Haraguchi	RISE 121 - DEAD or ALIVE -57 kg Tournament, Quarter Final	Tokyo, Japan	Ext.R Decision (Unanimous)	4	3:00
2017-09-16	Win	(Japan) Seiki Ueyama	Shoot Boxing 2017 act.4	Tokyo, Japan	Decision (Unanimous)	5	3:00
Defends Shoot Boxing Japan Super Bantamweight title
2017-06-16	Loss	(Japan) Kazuki Fukada	Shoot Boxing 2017 act.3	Tokyo, Japan	Decision (Majority)	5	3:00
For the Shoot Boxing Japan Featherweight title
2017-04-08	Win	(Japan) Genki	Shoot Boxing 2017 act.2	Tokyo, Japan	Decision (Unanimous)	3	3:00
2017-02-11	Win	(Japan) Shuto Miyazaki	Shoot Boxing 2017 act.1	Tokyo, Japan	Decision (Unanimous)	3	3:00
2016-11-11	Win	(Japan) Seiki Ueyama	Shoot Boxing World Tournament S-cup 2016	Tokyo, Japan	KO (Left Hook)	3	2:14
Defends Shoot Boxing Japan Super Bantamweight title
2016-06-01	Loss	(Japan) Eisaku Ogasawara	REBELS.43	Tokyo, Japan	Decision (Unanimous)	3	3:00
2016-04-03	Win	(Japan) Takanobu Sano	Shoot Boxing 2016 act.2	Tokyo, Japan	Decision (Unanimous)	3	3:00
2016-02-13	Win	(Japan) Yukinori Ogasawara	Shoot Boxing 2016 act.1	Tokyo, Japan	TKO (Right Hook)	3	0:13
2015-08-01	Loss	(Japan) Tenshin Nasukawa	BLADE FIGHTING CHAMPIONSHIP 2 JAPAN CUP −55 kg, Final	Tokyo, Japan	TKO (3 knockdowns)	1	1:41
For the 2015 Blade Japan Cup (55 kg) Tournament title
2015-08-01	Win	(Japan) Yuta Murakoshi	BLADE FIGHTING CHAMPIONSHIP 2 JAPAN CUP −55 kg, Semi Finals	Tokyo, Japan	Decision (Unanimous)	3	3:00
2015-08-01	Win	(Japan) Masahide Kudo	BLADE FIGHTING CHAMPIONSHIP 2 JAPAN CUP −55 kg, Quarter Finals	Tokyo, Japan	KO (Right Hook)	1	1:53
2015-06-21	Win	(Japan) Keisuke Miyamoto	Shoot Boxing 2015～SB30th Anniversary～ act.3	Tokyo, Japan	Decision (Unanimous)	3	3:00
2015-04-18	Win	(Japan) Takayuki Umehara	Shoot Boxing 2015～SB30th Anniversary～ act.2	Tokyo, Japan	Decision (Unanimous)	3	3:00
2015-02-21	Win	(Japan) Shuto Miyazaki	Shoot Boxing 2015～SB30th Anniversary～ act.1	Tokyo, Japan	Decision (Unanimous)	3	3:00
2014-11-30	Win	(Japan) Kazuyuki Fushimi	Shoot Boxing World Tournament S-cup 2014	Tokyo, Japan	KO (Knee)	4	1:00
Wins the Shoot Boxing Japan Super Bantamweight title
2014-11-02	Win	(Korea) Yang Chul Min	Shoot Boxing Young Caesar Cup Central #11 TOYOKAWA	Toyokawa, Aichi, Japan	KO	2	
2014-09-20	Win	(Japan) Koya Shimada	Shoot Boxing 2014 act.4	Tokyo, Japan	Decision (Unanimous)	3	3:00
2014-08-17	Loss	(Japan) Masao Fujimoto	Shoot Boxing OSAKA 2014 ALPINISME	Osaka, Japan	Ext.R Decision (Split)	4	3:00
2014-06-21	Win	(Japan) Kentaro Nagai	Shoot Boxing 2014 act.3	Tokyo, Japan	TKO (Referee Stoppage)	1	2:40
2014-04-13	Win	(Thailand) Imlon Luklontan	Shoot Boxing in TOYOKAWA UNCHAIN.1	Toyokawa, Aichi, Japan	KO	2	2:34
2013-12-15	Loss	(Japan) Yukinobu Nakatsuka	DEEP☆KICK 18	Osaka, Japan	Decision (Unanimous)	3	3:00
2013-11-03	Win	(Japan) Seiki Ueyama	Shoot Boxing Young Caesar Cup Central #8 TOYOKAWA	Toyokawa, Aichi, Japan	Ext.R Decision (Unanimous)	4	3:00
2013-06-23	Loss	(Japan) Kazuyuki Fushimi	Shoot Boxing 2013 act.3	Tokyo, Japan	Decision (Majority)	4	3:00
2013-04-07	Win	(Japan) Genki Izumi	Shoot Boxing YOUNG CAESAR CUP CENTRAL#6 TOYOKAWA	Toyokawa, Aichi, Japan	Decision	3	3:00
2012-12-23	Win	(Japan) Toshiyuki Nitamizu	OYAJI & ROOKIES DEEP in KASUGAI	Kasugai, Aichi, Japan	Decision (Split)	2	3:00
2012-11-14	Win	(Japan) Shin Isobe	Shoot Boxing Young Caesar Cup Central #5 TOYOKAWA	Toyokawa, Aichi, Japan	Decision (Unanimous)	3	3:00
2012-05-13	Win	(Japan) Sho Ikeno	Shoot Boxing Young Caesar Cup MACS	Toyokawa, Aichi, Japan	Decision (Unanimous)	2	3:00
2012-02-12	Win	(Japan) Barrett	Shoot Boxing Young Caesar Cup Central2012 #3 TOYOKAWA	Toyokawa, Aichi, Japan	Decision (Unanimous)	2	3:00
2011-11-06	Win	(Japan) Shohei Nishimura	Shoot Boxing SHOOT the SHOOTO 2011	Tokyo, Japan	Decision (Majority)	3	3:00
2011-07-31	Win	(Japan) Hikaru Kawano	Shoot Boxing in NIIGATA 2011	Niigata, Japan	Decision (Unanimous)	3	3:00
Legend: Win Loss Draw/No contest Notes

=== Amateur record ===
Amateur Kickboxing record
Date	Result	Opponent	Event	Location	Method	Round	Time
2011-12-04	Win	(Japan) Kimiya Ikehata	Amateur SHOOT BOXING	Nagoya, Japan	Decision (Unanimous)	2	3:00
2011-12-04	Win	(Japan) Fumito Shintaku	Amateur SHOOT BOXING	Nagoya, Japan	TKO	1	2:30
2011-09-18	Draw	(Japan) Kenichi Takeuchi	DEEP CAGE IMPACT 2011 in HAMAMATSU	Tokyo, Japan	Decision	3	3:00
2011-03-13	Win	(Japan) Naoki Inoue	SHOOT BOXING Young Cesar	Toyokawa, Aichi, Japan	Decision (Unanimous)	3	2:00
2011-02-06	Win	(Japan)	DEEP SHIZUOKA IMPACT	Shizuoka, Japan	Decision (Unanimous)	2	5:00
2010-10-31	Loss	(Japan) Ren Morita	NAGOYA KICK ～WALK ON～	Nagoya, Japan	Decision (Unanimous)	2	2:00
2010-09-12	Loss	(Japan) Hyui Ishimaru	CENTRAL KICK 2	Nagoya, Japan	Decision (Unanimous)	2	2:00
2010-07-18	Loss	(Japan) Mizuki Ootaka	Striking Challenge 23	Nagoya, Japan	Decision (Unanimous)	2	2:00
Legend: Win Loss Draw/No contest Notes

== See also ==
- List of male kickboxers
