= Rui Ebata =

Japanese kickboxer

- Born: 江幡 塁 January 10, 1991 (age 35); Tsuchiura, Japan
- Nationality: Japanese
- Height: 165 cm (5 ft 5 in)
- Weight: 55.0 kg (121.3 lb; 8.66 st)
- Division: Flyweight
- Style: Kickboxing; Kyokushin Karate
- Stance: Orthodox
- Fighting out of: Tokyo, Japan
- Team: Kickboxing Ihara Gym
- Years active: 2007 - present

Kickboxing record
- Total: 53
- Wins: 43
- By knockout: 21
- Losses: 7
- By knockout: 4
- Draws: 2
- No contests: 1

Other information
- Notable relatives: Mutsuki Ebata (twin brother)

Rui Ebata (江幡 塁, Ebata Rui) is a Japanese kickboxer, fighting out of Tokyo, Japan.

As of August 2021, he is the #6 ranked flyweight in the world according to Combat Press.

== Martial arts career ==
=== Winning the SNKA and WKBA titles ===
Ebata made his professional debut in 2007, with a unanimous decision win against Hiraeita Kano. After winning his debut fight, Ebata won 12 of his next 15 fights, only losing once, to Shota Takiya. He was given a chance to fight Daihachi Furuoka for the SNKA Bantamweight title during SNKA MAGNUM 26. He won it by a second-round TKO. He was scheduled to defend his title during SNKA BRAVE HEARTS 19, against Shirō. Ebata successfully defended the title, as the match ended in a draw.

Rui Ebata won his next four fights as well, before challenging Surachai Srisuriyanyothin for the Rajadamnern Stadium Super Bantamweight title, during SNKA TITANS NEOS XIV. Surachai won the fight by a fourth-round KO, snapping Ebata's 21 fight unbeaten streak.

In his next fight, Ebata fought Boonlai Sitnaigachon for the WKBA Super Bantamweight title. He won it through a second-round KO. He defended it for the first and only time during SNKA TITANS NEOS 17, when he was scheduled to fight Phetnamnen Sor.Panyokit. Rui won the fight in the fourth round, after knocking Phetnamnen with an uppercut.

=== KNOCK OUT Super Bantamweight tournament ===
After successfully defending his title, Ebata went on a 12–1 run, only losing to Senpichit STD Transport, and achieving a notable victory over Eisaku Ogasawara.

Ebata participated in the KNOCK OUT Super Bantamweight tournament, for the inaugural Super Bantamweight title. In the semifinal bout, he won a majority decision against Takashi Ohno, and in the finals he won a unanimous decision in a rematch with Eisaku Ogasawara.

=== Rizin and RISE debut ===
Ebata fought Tenshin Nasukawa in his Rizin debut, during Rizin 20 - Saitama. He lost the fight midway through the first round, by TKO. He was more successful in his next Rizin appearance, managing to win a unanimous decision against Seiki Ueyama.

Ebata participated in the 2020 RISE DEAD OR ALIVE tournament, and is scheduled to fight Masahiko Suzuki in the semifinals. He lost the semifinal bout by decision.

At RISE Eldorado 2021, Ebata fought KENGO, whom he beat by a first-round knockout.

Ebata announced his retirement on August 16, 2024. He had surgery in 2023 to remove a brain tumor.

== Titles and accomplishments ==
- Shin Nihon Kickboxing Association
  - 2011 SNKA Bantamweight Champion (one title defense)
- World Kick Boxing Association
  - 2014 WKBA World Super Bantamweight Champion (one title defense)
- KNOCK OUT
  - 2019 KNOCK OUT Super Bantamweight Champion

Awards

- 2020 Combat Press Fight of the Year (vs Masahiko Suzuki)

== Fight record ==
Kickboxing record
43 wins (21 (T)KOs), 7 losses, 2 draws, 1 no contest
Date	Result	Opponent	Event	Location	Method	Round	Time
2022-04-02	Loss	(Japan) Shiro	RISE El Dorado 2022	Tokyo, Japan	KO (right high kick)	2	1:39
2021-11-14	Loss	(Japan) Masahiko Suzuki	RISE World Series 2021 Osaka 2	Osaka, Japan	KO (right cross)	1	1:49
2021-02-28	Win	(Japan) Kengo	RISE Eldorado 2021	Yokohama, Japan	KO (left hook)	1	2:38
2020-11-01	Loss	(Japan) Masahiko Suzuki	RISE DEAD OR ALIVE 2020 Osaka, Semi Final	Osaka, Japan	Decision (unanimous)	3	3:00
2020-08-09	Win	(Japan) Seiki Ueyama	Rizin 22 – Yokohama	Yokohama, Japan	Decision (unanimous)	3	3:00
2019-12-31	Loss	(Japan) Tenshin Nasukawa	Rizin 20 - Saitama	Saitama, Japan	TKO (3 knockdown rule)	1	2:44
2019-08-18	Win	(Japan) Eisaku Ogasawara	K.O CLIMAX 2019 SUMMER KICK FEVER, Final	Tokyo, Japan	Decision (unanimous)	3	3:00
Wins the Inaugural KNOCK OUT Super Bantamweight title.
2019-08-18	Win	(Japan) Takashi Ohno	K.O CLIMAX 2019 SUMMER KICK FEVER, Semi Final	Tokyo, Japan	Decision (majority)	3	3:00
2019-03-03	Win	(Thailand) Anajak Sit Kaewprayun	SNKA MAGNUM 49	Tokyo, Japan	Decision (unanimous)	5	3:00
2018-12-09	Win	(Thailand) Samuay Phetmuantarat	SNKA SOUL IN THE RING 16	Tokyo, Japan	TKO (high kick)	3	
2018-10-21	Win	(Thailand) Tepburi Or Detpon	SNKA MAGNUM 48	Tokyo, Japan	TKO (ref. stoppage/knees)	2	
2018-06-08	Win	(Japan) Eisaku Ogasawara	KNOCK OUT SURVIVAL DAYS	Tokyo, Japan	KO (straight right)	3	1:34
2018-04-15	Win	(Korea) Yun Dok Jae	SNKA TITANS NEOS 23	Tokyo, Japan	Decision (unanimous)	5	3:00
2017-12-10	Win	(Japan) Keisuke Miyamoto	KNOCK OUT 2017 in Ryogoku	Tokyo, Japan	Decision (majority)	5	3:00
2017-07-02	Win	(Thailand) Yodyangam Tetrat	SNKA MAGNUM 44	Tokyo, Japan	TKO (low kicks)	2	0:56
2016-10-23	Win	(Thailand) Senpichit STD Transport	SNKA MAGNUM 42	Tokyo, Japan	TKO (ref. stoppage/low kicks)	4	0:51
2016-07-13	Win	(Thailand) Petkravee PetpumMuaythai	SNKA MAGNUM 41	Tokyo, Japan	TKO (corner stoppage)	3	1:53
2016-05-29	Loss	(Thailand) Senpichit STD Transport	Rajadamnern Stadium	Bangkok, Thailand	Decision	5	3:00
2016-03-13	Win	(Thailand) Glaipet Portawachai	SNKA MAGNUM 40	Tokyo, Japan	Decision (majority)	5	3:00
2015-10-25	Win	(Thailand) Prapupram Banbor Witayakom	SNKA MAGNUM 39	Tokyo, Japan	KO (body punches)	2	2:33
2015-07-12	Win	(Thailand) Kochasarn Dragonmuaythai	SNKA MAGNUM 38	Tokyo, Japan	KO (right uppercut)	5	2:13
2015-04-19	Win	(Thailand) Phetnamnen Sor.Panyokit	SNKA TITANS NEOS 17	Tokyo, Japan	KO (ref. stoppage/uppercut)	4	2:23
Defends WKBA Super Bantamweight title.
2014-10-26	Win	(Thailand) Hontonglek Chor.Forpuriansi	SNKA MAGNUM 36	Tokyo, Japan	Decision (unanimous)	5	3:00
2014-07-20	Win	(Thailand) Nampet Sor.Tamtip	SNKA MAGNUM 35	Tokyo, Japan	Decision (unanimous)	5	3:00
2014-03-09	Win	(Thailand) Boonlai Sitnaigachon	SNKA MAGNUM 34	Tokyo, Japan	KO (left hook to the body)	2	
Wins WKBA Super Bantamweight title.
2013-09-16	Loss	(Thailand) Surachai Srisuriyanyothin	SNKA TITANS NEOS XIV	Tokyo, Japan	KO (knee)	4	2:12
For the Rajadamnern Stadium Super Bantamweight title.
2013-07-21	Win	(Thailand) Fonpet Chuwattana	SNKA MAGNUM 32	Tokyo, Japan	KO (left straight)	3	2:38
2013-04-21	Win	(Thailand) Denisarn Sor.Suistor	SNKA TITANS NEOS 13	Tokyo, Japan	TKO (elbows)	1	0:45
2012-12-09	Win	(Thailand) Ronachai Sor.Sonmi	SNKA SOUL IN THE RING IX	Tokyo, Japan	Decision	3	3:00
2012-10-14	Win	(Thailand) Wattana Sitkaewbantit	SNKA MAGNUM 30	Tokyo, Japan	KO	2	1:16
2012-05-13	Draw	(Japan) Shiro	SNKA BRAVE HEARTS 19	Tokyo, Japan	Decision	5	3:00
Defends the SNKA Bantamweight title.
2012-03-11	Win	(Thailand) Petdam Chuwattana	SNKA MAGNUM 28	Tokyo, Japan	KO (low kicks & punches)	4	0:50
2012-01-15	Win	(Korea) Kim Jun Se	SNKA BRAVE HEARTS 18	Tokyo, Japan	Decision (unanimous)	3	3:00
2011-10-02	Win	(Thailand) Kwanton Lukpetnoi	SNKA MAGNUM 27	Tokyo, Japan	Decision (majority)	3	3:00
2011-07-24	Win	(Japan) Daihachi Furuoka	SNKA MAGNUM 26	Tokyo, Japan	TKO (doctor stoppage/elbow)	2	0:47
Wins the SNKA Bantamweight title.
2011-05-15	Win	(Japan) Shiro	SNKA BRAVE HEARTS 16	Tokyo, Japan	Decision (unanimous)	3	3:00
2011-03-26	Win	(Thailand) Egkarat KBA	SNKA MAGNUM 25	Tokyo, Japan	KO	2	2:31
2010-12-18	Win	(Japan) Benny Yukihide	SNKA SOUL IN THE RING VIII	Tokyo, Japan	KO (left high kick)	2	1:09
2010-11-14	Win	(Thailand) Thayatlek Sitpanjaphon	Rajadamnern Stadium	Bangkok, Thailand	KO	1	
2010-09-11	Win	(Thailand) Naronchai Dragontailgym	SNKA TITANS NEOS VIII	Tokyo, Japan	KO (left leg kick)	2	1:12
2010-05-30	Draw	(Japan) Benny Yukihide	SNKA KNOCK OUT 3	Tokyo, Japan	Decision	3	3:00
2010-04-18	Win	(Japan) DAISUKE	SNKA TITANS NEOS VII	Tokyo, Japan	TKO (doctor stoppage)	2	3:00
2009-12-13	Win	(Japan) Yasuhiko Abe	SNKA SOUL IN THE RING VII	Tokyo, Japan	Decision (unanimous)	3	3:00
2009-09-20	Win	(Japan) Tomochika	SNKA TITANS NEOS 6	Tokyo, Japan	Decision (unanimous)	3	3:00
2009-05-03	Win	(Japan) Yasukichi	SNKA KNOCK OUT 2	Tokyo, Japan	Decision (majority)	2	3:00
2009-03-29	Win	(Japan) Shohei Hayama	SNKA TITANS NEOS V	Tokyo, Japan	Decision (unanimous)	2	3:00
2009-01-18	Win	(Japan) Yasukichi	SNKA BRAVE HEARTS 10	Tokyo, Japan	Decision (majority)	2	3:00
2008-08-29	Loss	(Japan) Shota Takiya	K-1 Koshien KING OF UNDER 18～FINAL16～	Tokyo, Japan	Decision	3	3:00
2008-07-13	Win	(Japan) Shogo Iizuka	SNKA MAGNUM 17	Tokyo, Japan	Decision (unanimous)	2	3:00
2008-01-20	No Contest	(Japan) Yasukichi	SNKA BRAVE HEARTS 7	Tokyo, Japan		1	
2007-09-16	Win	(Japan) Hiraeita Kano	SNKA TITANS NEOS 2	Tokyo, Japan	Decision (unanimous)	2	3:00
Legend: Win Loss Draw/no contest Notes
