= Keisuke Miyamoto =

Japanese kickboxer (born 1992)

- Born: December 16, 1992 (age 33); Iruma, Japan
- Native name: 宮元 啓介
- Other names: THE CYCLONE
- Nationality: Japanese
- Height: 168 cm (5 ft 6 in)
- Weight: 55 kg (121 lb; 8 st 9 lb)
- Style: Kyokushin, Kickboxing
- Stance: Orthodox
- Fighting out of: Tokyo, Japan
- Team: Hashimoto Dojo

Kickboxing record
- Total: 56
- Wins: 33
- By knockout: 11
- Losses: 16
- By knockout: 3
- Draws: 7

Amateur record
- Total: 25
- Wins: 22
- By knockout: 5
- Losses: 2
- Draws: 1

Keisuke Miyamoto (宮元 啓介, born December 16, 1992) is a Japanese kickboxer.

== Kickboxing career ==
Miyamoto started Karate training at the age of 4 and won multiple titles in the youth categories before transitioning to Hashimoto Dojo and begin a kickboxing career in 2008.

In 2009 Miyamoto participated in the K-1 Koshien selection and won the Kanto B-block tournament. The win qualified him to the tournament Quarter Finals happening at the K-1 World MAX 2009 World Championship Tournament Final event on October 26, 2009. He lost by unanimous decision to future winner Masaaki Noiri.

After an amateur career of 22 wins, 2 defeats and 1 draw Miyamoto turned professional on January 31, 2010, at the MAJKF BREAK 1 event. He defeated Takashi Ohno by split decision.

Miyamoto won the MAJKF Rookie Tournament Bantamweight title on October 10, 2010, at the MAJKF BREAK 3 event where he defeated Hiroshi Watabe by unanimous decision.

On January 21, 2012, Miyamoto defeated Yu Hiramoto by fifth-round knockout to capture the vacant MAJKF Bantamweight title at MAJKF FIGHT FOR PEACE III BREAK-22.

On September 22, 2012, Miyamoto defeated Ryuya Kusakabe by unanimous decision at NJKF KICK TO THE FUTURE 6 to capture WBC Muay Thai Japan Super Bantamweight title.

On September 27, 2015, Miyamoto defeated Alexis Barateau by second-round knockout for the WBC Muay Thai International Super Bantamweight title.

On October 9, 2016, Miyamoto the most notable title of his career when he defeated Chuchai Kaewsamrit by knockout at a Japan Kickboxing Innovation event for the WPMF World Super Bantamweight title.

Prior to the fight it was announced that Miyamoto's rematch against Yugo Kato at NO KICK NO LIFE on January 9, 2021, would be the last of his career. He lost the fight by majority decision and retired at the age of 29.

== Championships and accomplishments ==
=== Kickboxing ===
Professional

- Martial Arts Japan Kickboxing Federation
  - 2010 MAJKF Bantamweight Rookie Tournament Winner
  - 2012 MAJKF Super Bantamweight Champion (defended once)
- World Boxing Council Muay Thai
  - 2012 WBC Muay Thai Japan Super Bantamweight Champion (Defended once)
  - 2015 WBC Muay Thai International Super Bantamweight Champion
- Japan Kickboxing Innovation
  - 2013 INNOVATION Super Bantamweight Champion (Defended twice)
- World Professional Muaythai Federation
  - 2016 WPMF World Super Bantamweight Champion

Amateur

- 2009 K-1 Koshien Kanto B-block Tournament Winner
- 2009 JAKF All Japan Featherweight Champion & Event MVP

=== Karate ===
- 2007 FSA All Japan Jr. Championship Middle School Winner
- 2007 FSA Asian Jr. Championship High School Winner
- 2008 JKJO All Japan Jr. Championship High School Winner
- 2008 IKO Kyokushinkaikan Youth (U-16) World Championship 3rd place

== Fight record ==
Kickboxing record
33 Wins (11 (T)KO's), 16 Losses, 7 Draws, 0 No Contest
Date	Result	Opponent	Event	Location	Method	Round	Time
2022-01-09	Loss	(Japan) Yugo Kato	NO KICK NO LIFE	Tokyo, Japan	Decision (Majority)	5	3:00
2021-09-20	Loss	(Japan) Ryota Mawatari	Japan Kickboxing Innovation - Resistance 3	Tokyo, Japan	Decision (Majority)	5	3:00
2021-02-24	Win	(Japan) Yugo Kato	NO KICK NO LIFE New Chapter -Ungai Soten-	Tokyo, Japan	Decision (Majority)	3	3:00
2020-11-08	Loss	(Japan) Eisaku Ogasawara	REBELS 67, RED rules -55.5 kg Championship Tournament Semi Final	Tokyo, Japan	Decision (Majority)	3	3:00
2020-09-12	Win	(Japan) Shogo Kuriaki	KNOCK OUT CHAMPIONSHIP.2	Tokyo, Japan	Decision (Unanimous)	3	3:00
2019-11-01	Win	(Japan) Yukinori Ogasawara	KNOCK OUT 2019 BREAKING DOWN	Tokyo, Japan	Decision (Unanimous)	3	3:00
2019-07-15	Win	(Japan) Naoya	Japan Kickboxing Innovation - Join Forces 14	Tokyo, Japan	Ext.R Decision (Unanimous)	6	3:00
2019-04-29	Loss	(Japan) Rasta	KNOCK OUT 2019 SPRING: THE FUTURE IS IN THE RING	Tokyo, Japan	Decision (Unanimous)	5	3:00
2019-02-17	Win	(Japan) KOUMA	Pancrase REBELS Ring 1	Tokyo, Japan	Decision (Unanimous)	3	3:00
2018-12-08	Win	(Japan) Takahiro Sakuragi	Japan Kickboxing Innovation - Champions Carnival 2018	Tokyo, Japan	Decision (Unanimous)	5	3:00
2018-10-08	Win	(Thailand) Dawsakorn Mor.Tassanai	REBELS 58	Tokyo, Japan	Ext.R Decision (Split)	4	3:00
2018-08-03	Draw	(Japan) Kyosuke Yasuda	REBELS 58	Tokyo, Japan	Decision (Majority)	5	3:00
2018-05-03	Loss	(Japan) Ryo Takahashi	KNOCK OUT 2018 Osaka 1st	Osaka, Japan	Decision (Unanimous)	5	3:00
2018-02-18	Draw	(Japan) Yukinori Ogasawara	REBELS 54	Tokyo, Japan	Decision (Unanimous)	3	3:00
2017-12-10	Loss	(Japan) Rui Ebata	KNOCK OUT 2017 in Ryogoku	Tokyo, Japan	Decision (Majority)	5	3:00
2017-10-04	Win	(Japan) Yuki Noro	ROAD TO KNOCK OUT 5	Tokyo, Japan	KO (High Kick)	3	2:05
2017-05-10	Win	(Japan) Kazuyuki Fushimi	ROAD TO KNOCK OUT 1	Tokyo, Japan	TKO (Corner Stoppage)	3	2:58
2017-03-11	Win	(Japan) Hidemaru	REBELS 49	Tokyo, Japan	Decision (Unanimous)	3	3:00
2016-12-05	Loss	(Japan) Eisaku Ogasawara	KNOCK OUT vol.0	Tokyo, Japan	KO (Head Kick)	3	2:53
2016-10-09	Win	(Thailand) Chuchai Kaewsamrit	JAPAN KICKBOXING INNOVATION - Okayama Gym Show 3	Kurashiki, Japan	KO (Body Kick)	2	2:09
Wins WPMF World Super Bantamweight title.
2016-08-07	Draw	(Japan) Masahide Kudo	KUNLUN FIGHT 49×REBELS.45	Tokyo, Japan	Decision (Majority)	3	3:00
2016-06-24	Loss	(Japan) Shodai Kitazono	NO KICK NO LIFE ～The Final～	Tokyo, Japan	Decision (Unanimous)	5	3:00
2016-04-29	Win	(Japan) Yukinobu Nakatsuka	JAPAN KICKBOXING INNOVATION Dream Force-11	Tokyo, Japan	Decision (Unanimous)	5	3:00
Defends the INNOVATION Super Bantamweight title.
2016-03-12	Loss	(Japan) Tenshin Nasukawa	No Kick No Life 2016	Tokyo, Japan	KO (left knee to the body)	2	0:26
2015-12-12	Win	(Thailand) Nakornlek AceGym	JAPAN KICKBOXING INNOVATION Champions Carnival 2015	Tokyo, Japan	TKO (Corner Stoppage)	4	2:39
2015-09-27	Win	(France) Alexis Barateau	NJKF 2015 6th	Tokyo, Japan	KO (Body Punches)	2	3:04
Wins the vacant WBC Muay Thai International Super Bantamweight title.
2015-06-21	Loss	(Japan) Taiki Naito	Shoot Boxing 2015～SB30th Anniversary～ act.3	Tokyo, Japan	Decision (Unanimous)	3	3:00
2015-04-26	Win	(Japan) Yukinobu Nakatsuka	JAPAN KICKBOXING INNOVATION Dream Force-7	Tokyo, Japan	Decision (Unanimous)	5	3:00
Defends the INNOVATION Super Bantamweight title.
2015-02-11	Loss	(Japan) Sota Ichinohe	NO KICK, NO LIFE 2015	Tokyo, Japan	Decision (Majority)	5	3:00
2014-12-13	Win	(Japan) Yu Wor.Wanchai	JAPAN KICKBOXING INNOVATION Champions Carnival 2014	Tokyo, Japan	Decision (Unanimous)	5	3:00
2014-09-27	Draw	(Thailand) Muengfang AceGym	JAPAN KICKBOXING INNOVATION Dream Force-5	Tokyo, Japan	Decision (Majority)	5	3:00
2014-07-21	Loss	(Japan) Kunitaka	NJKF 2014 5th	Tokyo, Japan	Decision (Split)	5	3:00
For the WBC Muay Thai International Super Bantamweight title.
2014-04-29	Win	(Japan) Shusaku Shirai	JAPAN KICKBOXING INNOVATION Dream Force-I	Tokyo, Japan	Decision (Unanimous)	5	3:00
2014-03-16	Win	(Japan) Yuki	REBELS.25 a.k.a INNOVATION's day	Tokyo, Japan	Decision (Unanimous)	3	3:00
2014-01-12	Loss	(Japan) Shiro	SNKA WINNERS 2014	Tokyo, Japan	Decision (Unanimous)	5	3:00
2013-09-22	Draw	(Japan) Hiroya Haga	NJKF 2013 6th	Tokyo, Japan	Decision (Unanimous)	5	3:00
Defends WBC Muay Thai Japan Super Bantamweight title.
2013-07-21	Loss	(Japan) Hidemaru	REBELS.17	Tokyo, Japan	Decision (Unanimous)	5	3:00
2013-06-16	Loss	(Japan) Ryuma Tobe	Krush 29	Tokyo, Japan	Ext.R Decision (Unanimous)	4	3:00
2013-03-20	Win	(Japan) Masahiro	Krush 27	Tokyo, Japan	Decision (Unanimous)	5	3:00
2013-01-27	Draw	(Japan) Kunihiro	MAJKF BREAK－33 ～FIGHT FOR PEACE 4	Tokyo, Japan	Decision	5	3:00
Defends MAJKF Super Bantamweight title.
2012-12-09	Loss	(Thailand) Kantipong Sor.Dedamrong	MAJKF BREAK－32 ～SEIZE	Tokyo, Japan	TKO (Referee Stoppage)	3	0:50
2012-09-22	Win	(Japan) Ryuya Kusakabe	NJKF KICK TO THE FUTURE 6	Tokyo, Japan	Decision (Unanimous)	5	3:00
Wins WBC Muay Thai Japan Super Bantamweight title.
2012-07-15	Draw	(Thailand) Pinsiam Sor.Amnuaysirichoke	MA Japan Kick KICK GUTS 2012	Tokyo, Japan	Decision (Unanimous)	3	3:00
2012-01-29	Win	(Japan) Arato	NJKF KICK TO THE FUTURE 2	Tokyo, Japan	Decision (Majority)	3	3:00
2012-03-18	Win	(Japan) Minoru Junibayashi	MAJKF BREAK-24 ～SAGITTARIUS～	Tokyo, Japan	KO (Body shot)	3	2:59
2012-01-22	Win	(Japan) Yu Hiramoto	MAJKF FIGHT FOR PEACE III BREAK-22 - Super Bantamweight Championship Tournament Final	Tokyo, Japan	KO (Right High kick)	5	1:50
Wins the vacant MAJKF Super Bantamweight title.
2011-11-20	Win	(Japan) Kunihiro	MAJKF BREAK－20 ～RAISE～ - Super Bantamweight Championship Tournament Semi Final	Tokyo, Japan	Decision (Unanimous)	5	3:00
2011-09-25	Loss	(Japan) Takayuki Umehara	MAJKF BREAK-17～Khaos～	Tokyo, Japan	Decision (Unanimous)	5	3:00
2011-06-18	Win	(Japan) Masashi Tanaka	MAJKF BREAK-14 ～IRIS～	Tokyo, Japan	KO (3 Knockdowns)	3	2:14
2011-03-26	Win	(Japan) Keita Matsumoto	MAJKF BREAK-11 ～NEXUS～	Tokyo, Japan	KO (Left Body Hook)	2	2:33
2011-01-15	Win	(Japan) Kazu Nakadankari	MAJKF BREAK-8 FIGHT FOR PEACE 2	Tokyo, Japan	Decision (Unanimous)	3	3:00
2010-10-10	Win	(Japan) Hiroshi Watabe	MAJKF BREAK-3 - Bantamweight Rookie Tournament Final	Tokyo, Japan	Decision (Unanimous)	3	3:00
Wins MAJKF Bantamweight Rookie Tournament title.
2010-07-31	Win	(Japan) Yojiro Kikuchi	Bigbang	Tokyo, Japan	Decision (Unanimous)	3	3:00
2010-06-27	Win	(Japan) Ryo Fujieda	MAJKF BREAK-3 - Bantamweight Rookie Tournament Semi Final	Tokyo, Japan	KO	1	1:10
2010-04-18	Win	(Japan) Ryusei Ikeda	J-NETWORK J-FIGHT in SHINJUKU ～vol.14～	Tokyo, Japan	KO	3	2:23
2010-01-31	Win	(Japan) Takashi Ohno	MAJKF BREAK-1	Tokyo, Japan	Decision (Split)	3	2:00
Legend: Win Loss Draw/No contest Notes

Amateur kickboxing record
Date	Result	Opponent	Event	Location	Method	Round	Time
2010-11-20	Loss	(Japan) Hiroto Iwasaki	K-1 Koshien 2009 King of Under 18 Tournament Final	Tokyo, Japan	Decision (Split)	1	2:00
2009-10-26	Loss	(Japan) Masaaki Noiri	K-1 World MAX 2009 World Championship Tournament Final, K-1 Koshien 2009 King of Under 18 Tournament Quarter Finals	Yokohama, Japan	Decision (unanimous)	3	2:00
2009-08-10	Win	(Japan) Taishi Hiratsuka	K-1 Koshien 2009 King of Under 18 Tournament Final 16	Tokyo, Japan	TKO (Referee Stoppage)	1	1:38
2009-06-28	Win	(Japan) Kohei Nishikawa	K-1 Koshien 2009 King of Under 18 Kanto Selection, Final	Chiba, Japan	Ext.R Decision	2	2:00
2009-06-28	Win	(Japan) Namito Izawa	K-1 Koshien 2009 King of Under 18 Kanto Selection, Semi Final	Chiba, Japan	Decision	1	2:00
2009-06-28	Win	(Japan) Nobuto Ikeda	K-1 Koshien 2009 King of Under 18 Kanto Selection, Quarter Final	Chiba, Japan	Decision	1	2:00
2009-06-28	Win	(Japan) Shun Fuji	K-1 Koshien 2009 King of Under 18 Kanto Selection, 1/8 Final	Chiba, Japan	Decision	1	2:00
Legend: Win Loss Draw/No contest Notes

== See also ==
- List of male kickboxers
