= Eisaku Ogasawara =

Japanese kickboxer (born 1995)

- Born: 小笠原瑛作; September 11, 1995 (age 31); Tokyo, Japan
- Other names: Speed Actor
- Height: 168 cm (5 ft 6 in)
- Weight: 57.5 kg (127 lb; 9.05 st)
- Division: Flyweight; Bantamweight
- Style: Kickboxing, Muay Thai
- Stance: Orthodox
- Fighting out of: Tokyo, Japan
- Team: Crosspoint Kichijoji
- Years active: 2011 - present

Kickboxing record
- Total: 63
- Wins: 49
- By knockout: 24
- Losses: 12
- By knockout: 10
- Draws: 1
- No contests: 1

Ogasawara Eisaku (born 11 September 1995) is a Japanese kickboxer. He is the reigning KNOCK OUT RED Featherweight champion and the former ISKA World Bantamweight K-1, WPMF Super Bantamweight and KNOCK OUT Super Bantamweight champion.

== Martial arts career ==
=== Flyweight ===
==== Rebels Flyweight title reign ====
Ogasawara made his professional debut in July 2017 against Shoyo Yuasa, during the REBELS×IT’S SHOWTIME crossover event. Ogasawara won the fight by unanimous decision.

After a KO victory in Thailand a month later, Eisaku went on a six fight winning streak, beating Tatakau Pastry, Naoya Yajima, Yasuhito Furuta, Yosuke Kafuji, Dynamo Puchi, and Kiminori Matsuzaki.

His eight fight winning streak earned him a chance to fight Hiroyuki Yamano for the REBELS-Muaythai Flyweight title. He defeated Yamano by unanimous decision.

After winning his first major title, Ogasawara would suffer his first professional loss in the very next fight. He was scheduled to fight Ryuji Kato during TNK1 feat. REBELS, and lost by KO in the first round. Ogasawara was then scheduled to fight Hong Chunhen, but once again lost by KO, after being dropped three times in the second round.

Eisaku would rebound from these losses by winning his next five fights. He beat Rose Tatsuya and Satoshi Katashima by TKO, and won decisions against Yasuhito Furuta, Yun Dok Jae and Jockylek GT-gym.

He was scheduled to fight for the MuayThaiOpen Super Flyweight title during MuayThaiOpen 30. Ogasawara won the fight by TKO in the second round, after knocking Takayuki down three times in the second round. The two of them fought a rematch four months later, during REBELS.37, for the REBELS 52.5 kg title. Ogasawara once again won by TKO, this time in the first round.

=== Super bantamweight ===
==== ISKA and WPMF title wins ====
Ogasawara afterwards fought Yuko Ogata at BLADE.2, and won the fight by a first round KO. Eisaku then fought Munfan Acegym during Rebels 38, and won by unanimous decision. He scored knockout wins of Arashi Fujihara and Takashi Ohno, as well as a unanimous decision win over Taiki Naito.

Ogasawara was scheduled to fight the former RISE Bantamweight champion Yuta Murakoshi during RISE 112. Eisaku lost by a third round TKO. It was his first loss in nearly three years.

He rebounded from his loss with a 43 second KO of Masahide Kudo. Ogasawara won his next five fights by (T)KO as well, scoring victories over Keisuke Miyamoto, Hiroya Haga, Sung Ji Byun, Wanchalong PK.Saenchai and Hyo Sik Hwang.

Ogasawara was set to fight Franck Gross for the ISKA K-1 rules World Bantamweight title. Ogasawara won the fight by a unanimous decision. After a draw with Ryo Takahashi, Ogasawara fought Dawsakon Mor.Tassanai for the WPMF World Super Bantamweight title. He won the fight by a third round KO.

==== KNOCK OUT Super Bantamweight tournament ====
He suffered his fourth professional loss to Rui Ebata during KNOCK OUT SURVIVAL DAYS. Ebata won their fight by KO.

Eisaku fought in the Rajadamnern Stadium for the first time in August 2018, when he faced Jomkitti Sitanothai. He beat Jomkitti by a second round KO. He was then scheduled to fight King Kyosuke during Rebels 58, and won by unanimous decision. He rematched Ryo Takahashi during KING OF KNOCK OUT 2018, and won by unanimous decision. Eisaku beat Petyaso Dabrunsarakarm by a head kick KO at the Pancrase REBELS Ring 1. Eisaku extended his winning streak to five, with a decision win over Seiki Ueyama. He lost to Yuki Kasahara by TKO, after the ringside doctor stopped the fight in the second round.

Ogasawara entered the 2019 KNOCK OUT Super Bantamweight tournament. He won a unanimous decision against Mikel Fernandez in the semifinals, but lost a decision in turn in the finals, in a rematch with Rui Ebata.

==== Rebels 55.5 kg tournament ====
After his loss in the tournament finals, Ogasawara was scheduled to fight Saoek Sitchefboontham. Saoek won by a second round head kick KO.

He won his next three fights, defeating Dekdoi TNmuaythai and Issei Saenchaigym by KO, and defeating Kaopong Por.Petchmanee by decision.

Ogasawara participated in the Rebels 55.5 kg tournament, facing Keisuke Miyamoto in the tournament semifinals. He won by majority decision. He is scheduled to face his brother Yukinori Ogasawara in the final for the inaugural REBELS-RED 55.5 kg title. He was rescheduled to fight King Kyosuke for the KNOCK OUT RED Super Bantamweight title. He won the fight with a body kick knockout, mid-way through the third round.

==== KNOCK OUT RED Super Bantamweight champion ====
Ogasawara was scheduled to face the former DEEP KICK 57.5 kg champion Hiro Yokono in a non-title bout at KNOCK OUT 2021 vol.3 on July 18, 2021. He won the fight by a second-round knockout. Both the knockout and the knockdown that preceded it were scored it the same manner, by low kick, which Ogasawara had been throwing throughout the bout.

Ogasawara was scheduled to make his first KNOCK OUT title defense against Issei Saenchaigym at KNOCK OUT 2021 vol.6 on November 28, 2021. He won the fight by unanimous decision.

Ogasawara was booked to face Takuma Ota at KNOCK OUT 2022 vol.2 on March 12, 2022. He won the fight by unanimous decision.

=== Featherweight ===
Ogawasara vacated the Knock Out Red Super bantamweight title on August 18, 2022. On the same day, it was announced that Ogasawara would face Takeru for the vacant KNOCK OUT RED Featherweight title at KNOCK OUT 2022 vol.5 on September 23, 2022. He won the fight and the vacant title by a second-round knockout.

Ogasawara faced Chartpayak Saksatun at KNOCK OUT 2022 vol.8 on December 11, 2022. Despite twice knocking Chartpayak down, Ogasawara lost the fight by a third-round technical knockout, as his opponent was able to open a cut above Ogasawara's eye midway through the final round.

Ogasawara faced the three-weight Lumpinee Boxing Stadium champion Ronachai Tor.Ramintra at KNOCK OUT 2023 SUPER BOUT BLAZE on March 5, 2023. He won the fight by unanimous decision, with scores of 29–28, 30–28 and 30–27.

Ogasawara faced Tongmeechai Fellow Gym at KNOCK OUT 2023 vol.2 on June 11, 2023. He won the fight by majority decision, with scores of 29–28, 30–29 and 29–29.

Ogasawara faced Yodwittaya YiewBangSaen at ONE Friday Fights 30 on August 25, 2023. He won the fight by knockout, 31 seconds into the opening round.

Ogasawara faced Pansak Wor.Wantawee at KNOCK OUT 2023 vol.5 on November 5, 2023.

== Titles and accomplishments ==
=== Professional ===
- KNOCK OUT
  - 2021 KNOCK OUT RED Super Bantamweight Champion
  - 2022 KNOCK OUT RED Featherweight Champion
- World Professional Muaythai Federation
  - 2018 WPMF World Super Bantamweight Champion
- International Sport Karate Association
  - 2017 ISKA K-1 rules World Bantamweight Champion
- REBELS
  - 2013 REBELS Red Flyweight Champion
  - 2015 REBELS Black Super Flyweight Champion
- Muay Thai Open
  - 2015 MuayThaiOpen Super Flyweight Champion

=== Amateur ===
- 2009 KAMINARIMON -45 kg Champion
- 2010 M-1 Junior -45 kg Champion

== Fight record ==
Kickboxing & Muay Thai record
49 Wins (24 (T)KO's), 11 Losses, 1 Draw, 1 No Contest
Date	Result	Opponent	Event	Location	Method	Round	Time
2025-09-05	Loss	(Thailand) Sanit Lookthamsuea	ONE Friday Fights 123, Lumpinee Stadium	Bangkok, Thailand	KO (Elbows)	2	0:41
2024-12-30	NC	(Cambodia) Chomroeun KunKhmer	KNOCK OUT K.O CLIMAX	Yokohama, Japan	(kick to a downed opponent)	1	
2024-09-27	Loss	(Thailand) Rittidet Sor.Sommai	ONE Friday Fights 81	Bangkok, Thailand	Decision (Unanimous)	3	3:00
2024-06-23	Win	(Thailand) Denkriengkrai Singhamawynn	KNOCK OUT 2024 SUPER BOUT BLAZE	Tokyo, Japan	Decision (Unanimous)	3	3:00
2024-04-26	Win	(Thailand) Sornsuknoi FA Group	ONE Friday Fights 60	Bangkok, Thailand	Decision (Majority)	3	3:00
2023-12-22	Loss	(Thailand) Chorfah Tor.Sangtiennoi	ONE Friday Fights 46	Bangkok, Thailand	KO (Right cross)	2	0:57
2023-11-05	Loss	(Thailand) Win Sitjaenim	KNOCK OUT 2023 vol.5	Tokyo, Japan	Ext.R Decision (Unanimous)	4	3:00
2023-08-25	Win	(Thailand) Yodwittaya YiewBangSaen	ONE Friday Fights 30, Lumpinee Stadium	Bangkok, Thailand	KO (Right hook)	1	0:31
2023-06-11	Win	(Thailand) Tongmeechai Fellow Gym	KNOCK OUT 2023 vol.2	Tokyo, Japan	Decision (Majority)	3	3:00
2023-03-05	Win	(Thailand) Ronachai Tor.Ramintra	KNOCK OUT 2023 SUPER BOUT BLAZE	Tokyo, Japan	Decision (Unanimous)	3	3:00
2022-12-11	Loss	(Thailand) Chartpayak Saksatun	KNOCK OUT 2022 vol.8	Tokyo, Japan	TKO (Doctor stop./cut)	3	1:22
2022-09-23	Win	(Japan) Takeru Owaki	KNOCK OUT 2022 vol.5	Tokyo, Japan	KO (Right hook)	2	0:58
Wins the vacant KNOCK OUT RED Featherweight title.
2022-03-12	Win	(Japan) Takuma Ota	KNOCK OUT 2022 vol.2	Tokyo, Japan	Decision (Unanimous)	3	3:00
2021-11-28	Win	(Japan) Issei Saenchaigym	KNOCK OUT 2021 vol.6	Tokyo, Japan	Decision (Unanimous)	5	3:00
Defends the KNOCK OUT RED Super Bantamweight title.
2021-07-18	Win	(Japan) Hiro Yokono	KNOCK OUT 2021 vol.3	Tokyo, Japan	KO (Left low kick)	2	1:18
2021-03-13	Win	(Japan) King Kyosuke	KNOCK OUT ～The REBORN～	Tokyo, Japan	KO (Left middle kick)	3	1:24
Wins the inaugural KNOCK OUT RED Super Bantamweight title.
2020-11-08	Win	(Japan) Keisuke Miyamoto	REBELS 67, Red -55.5 kg Championship Tournament Semi Final	Tokyo, Japan	Decision (Majority)	3	3:00
2020-09-12	Win	(Japan) Issei Saenchaigym	KNOCK OUT CHAMPIONSHIP.2	Tokyo, Japan	KO (Right Hook)	1	1:37
2020-02-11	Win	(Thailand) Kaopong Por.Petchmanee	Lumpinee Stadium	Bangkok, Thailand	Decision	5	3:00
2020-01-19	Win	(Thailand) Dekdoi TNmuaythai	Chang MuayThai Kiatpetch Super Fight, OrTorGor3 Stadium	Nonthaburi, Thailand	KO (Low Kicks)	3	
2019-11-01	Loss	(Thailand) Saoek Sitchefboontham	KNOCK OUT 2019 BREAKING DAWN	Tokyo, Japan	KO (High Kick)	2	2:29
2019-09-18	Loss	(Japan) Rui Ebata	K.O CLIMAX 2019 SUMMER KICK FEVER, Super Bantamweight Tournament, Final	Tokyo, Japan	Decision (Unanimous)	3	3:00
For the inaugural KING of KNOCK OUT Super Bantamweight title.
2019-08-18	Win	(Spain) Mikel Fernandez	K.O CLIMAX 2019 SUMMER KICK FEVER, Super Bantamweight Tournament, Semi Final	Tokyo, Japan	Decision (Unanimous)	3	3:00
2019-06-23	Loss	(Japan) Yuki Kasahara	SHOOT BOXING 2019 act.3	Tokyo, Japan	TKO (Doctor Stoppage)	3	0:50
2019-04-27	Win	(Japan) Seiki Ueyama	SHOOT BOXING 2019 act.2	Tokyo, Japan	Decision (Unanimous)	3	3:00
2019-02-17	Win	(Thailand) Petyaso Dabrunsarakarm	Pancrase REBELS Ring 1	Tokyo, Japan	KO (High Kick)	1	1:28
2018-12-09	Win	(Japan) Ryo Takahashi	KING OF KNOCK OUT 2018	Tokyo, Japan	Decision (Unanimous)	5	3:00
2018-10-08	Win	(Japan) King Kyosuke	REBELS.58	Tokyo, Japan	Decision (Unanimous)	5	3:00
2018-08-22	Win	(Thailand) Jomkitti Sitanothai	Rajadamnern Stadium	Bangkok, Thailand	KO	2	
2018-06-08	Loss	(Japan) Rui Ebata	KNOCK OUT SURVIVAL DAYS	Tokyo, Japan	KO (Punch)	3	1:34
2018-04-27	Win	(Thailand) Dawsakon Mor.Tassanai	REBELS.55	Tokyo, Japan	KO (Right Hook)	3	0:49
Wins the WPMF World Super Bantamweight title.
2017-12-10	Draw	(Japan) Ryo Takahashi	KING OF KNOCK OUT 2017	Tokyo, Japan	Decision	5	3:00
2017-09-06	Win	(France) Franck Gross	REBELS.52	Tokyo, Japan	Decision (Unanimous)	5	3:00
Wins ISKA K-1 rules World Bantamweight title.
2017-08-20	Win	(Korea) Hyo Sik Hwang	KNOCK OUT vol.4	Tokyo, Japan	KO (Elbows)	1	0:42
2017-06-17	Win	(Thailand) Wanchalong PK.Saenchai	KNOCK OUT vol.3	Tokyo, Japan	TKO (Corner Stoppage)	5	1:10
2017-04-01	Win	(Korea) Sung Ji Byun	KNOCK OUT vol.2	Tokyo, Japan	TKO (Low kicks)	3	1:32
2017-02-12	Win	(Japan) Hiroya Haga	KNOCK OUT vol.1	Tokyo, Japan	TKO (Doctor Stoppage)	2	1:13
2016-12-05	Win	(Japan) Keisuke Miyamoto	KNOCK OUT vol.0	Tokyo, Japan	KO (Head Kick)	2	2:53
2016-10-23	Win	(Japan) Masahide Kudo	REBELS.46	Tokyo, Japan	KO (Right Hook)	1	0:43
2016-07-30	Loss	(Japan) Yuta Murakoshi	RISE 112	Tokyo, Japan	TKO (Corner Stoppage)	3	1:53
2016-06-01	Win	(Japan) Taiki Naito	REBELS.43	Tokyo, Japan	Decision (Unanimous)	3	3:00
2016-03-09	Win	(Japan) Takashi Ohno	REBELS.41	Tokyo, Japan	TKO	3	2:29
2015-12-13	Win	(Japan) Arashi Fujihara	MuayThaiOpen 33 ＆ Lumpinee Boxing Stadium of Japan	Tokyo, Japan	KO (Left Hook)	1	1:34
2015-09-16	Win	(Thailand) Munfan Acegym	REBELS.38	Tokyo, Japan	Decision (Unanimous)	3	3:00
2015-08-01	Win	(Japan) Yuko Ogata	BLADE.2 -BLADE FIGHTING CHAMPIONSHIP- BLADE FC JAPAN CUP -55 kg	Tokyo, Japan	KO (Left Hook)	1	1:32
2015-07-12	Win	(Japan) Yuki Ueba	REBELS.37	Tokyo, Japan	TKO (Corner stoppage)	1	1:40
Wins the vacant REBELS 52.5kg title.
2015-03-22	Win	(Japan) Takayuki Saenchaigym	MuayThaiOpen 30	Tokyo, Japan	TKO (3 Knockdowns)	2	1:47
Wins the MuayThaiOpen Super Flyweight title.
2015-01-25	Win	(Japan) Satoshi Katashima	REBELS.33	Tokyo, Japan	TKO (Corner Stoppage)	5	0:48
2014-10-26	Win	(Thailand) Jockylek GT-gym	REBELS.31	Tokyo, Japan	Decision (Majority)	3	3:00
2014-07-25	Win	(Korea) Yun Dok Jae	RISE cooperation REBELS.28	Tokyo, Japan	Decision (Unanimous)	3	3:00
2014-04-20	Win	(Japan) Yasuhito Furuta	REBELS.26 ～the duel～	Tokyo, Japan	Decision (Unanimous)	3	3:00
2014-01-26	Win	(Japan) Rose Tatsuya	REBELS.23	Tokyo, Japan	TKO (Doctor Stoppage)	5	0:37
2013-12-20	Loss	(Cambodia) Hong Chunhen	Titan Fight, Samurai vs Khmer	Cambodia	TKO (3 Knockdowns)	2	
2013-06-09	Loss	(Japan) Ryuji Kato	TNK1 feat.REBELS	Gunma, Japan	KO	1	1:15
2013-05-06	Win	(Japan) Hiroyuki Yamano	REBELS.16	Tokyo, Japan	Decision (Unanimous)	5	3:00
Wins the REBELS-Muaythai Flyweight title.
2013-01-27	Win	(Japan) Kiminori Matsuzaki	REBELS.14	Tokyo, Japan	Decision (Unanimous)	5	3:00
2012-09-16	Win	(Japan) Dynamo Puchi	J-GIRLS 2012 ～Platinum’s In The Ring 4th～	Tokyo, Japan	Decision (Unanimous)	5	3:00
2012-08-26	Win	(Japan) Yosuke Kafuji	J-NETWORK J-KICK 2012～NEXT J-GENERATION～4th	Tokyo, Japan	Decision (Unanimous)	3	3:00
2012-04-15	Win	(Japan) Yasuhito Furuta	REBELS.11	Tokyo, Japan	Decision (Unanimous)	3	3:00
2012-01-22	Win	(Japan) Naoya Yajima	REBELS.10	Tokyo, Japan	Decision (Unanimous)	3	3:00
2011-10-23	Win	(Japan) Tatakau Pastry	REBELS.9	Tokyo, Japan	Decision (Unanimous)	3	3:00
2011-08-28	Win	(Thailand)		Thailand	KO	2	
2011-07-18	Win	(Japan) Shoyo Yuasa	REBELS×IT’S SHOWTIME ～REBELS.8 & IT’S SHOWTIME JAPAN	Tokyo, Japan	Decision (Unanimous)	3	3:00
Legend: Win Loss Draw/No contest Notes

Amateur Kickboxing Record
Date	Result	Opponent	Event	Location	Method	Round	Time
2013-02-16	Draw	(Japan) Tenshin Nasukawa	Kichijoji Fight Club	Tokyo, Japan	Decision	3	2:00
2011-06-05	Loss	(Japan) Takayuki Komamura	Muay Yoko 15, Final	Tokyo, Japan	Decision	3	2:00
2011-06-05	Win	(Japan) Hyuhi Segawa	Muay Yoko 15, Semi Final	Tokyo, Japan	TKO	1	
2011-04-24	Win	(Japan) Ren Hiramoto	REBELS.7	Tokyo, Japan	Decision	3	2:00
2010-12-12	Loss	(Japan) Sumiya Ito	M-1 Muay Thai Amateur 39	Tokyo, Japan	Decision	3	2:00
For the M-1 Muay Thai Amateur -50kg title.
2010-08-29	Loss	(Japan) Takumi Nakura	M-1 Muay Thai Amateur 36 - M-1 Kid's CHAMPION CARNIVAL 2010 2nd	Tokyo, Japan	Decision	3	2:00
For the M-1 Muay Thai Amateur -50kg title.
2010-07-19	Win	(Japan) Ryosuke Otake	REBELS.3	Tokyo, Japan	KO (Left Cross)	1	0:40
Defends KAMINARIMON -45kg title.
2010-04-25	Draw	(Japan) Hiromasa Ozaki	RISE 64	Tokyo, Japan	Decision	2	2:00
2010-03-28	Win	(Japan) Hayate Kaji	M-1 Muay Thai Amateur 33 - M-1 Kid's CHAMPION CARNIVAL 2010	Tokyo, Japan	Decision (Unanimous)	3	
Wins M-1 Muay Thai Amateur -45kg title.
2010-01-23	Win	(Japan) Shokichi Iwata	REBELS	Tokyo, Japan	Decision	2	2:00
2009-11-22	Win	(Japan) Ryusei Kondo	KAMINARIMON	Tokyo, Japan	Decision		
Wins KAMINARIMON -45kg title.
2009-10-25	Win	(Japan) Ryusei Kondo	KAMINARIMON, Final	Tokyo, Japan	Decision (Unanimous)	1	2:00
2009-10-25	Win	(Japan) Keito Obinata	KAMINARIMON, Semi Final	Tokyo, Japan	Decision (Unanimous)	1	2:00
2009-09-27	Loss	(Japan) Tokio Yachuda	KAMINARIMON	Tokyo, Japan	Decision (Unanimous)		
2009-09-27	Win	(Japan) Kyosuke Oyama	KAMINARIMON	Tokyo, Japan	KO	1	
2009-08-23	Win	(Japan) Ryusei Watanabe	KAMINARIMON	Tokyo, Japan	KO	2	
2009-02-22	Win	(Japan) Ryusei Kondo	KAMINARIMON	Tokyo, Japan	Decision (Unanimous)		
2009-02-22	Win	(Japan) Ryusei Watanabe	KAMINARIMON	Tokyo, Japan	Decision (Unanimous)		
Legend: Win Loss Draw/No contest Notes

== See also ==
- List of male kickboxers
