= 2024 in RISE =

Kickboxing events

Information
- First date: January 14

Events
- Total events: 15

The year 2024 was the 21st year in the history of RISE, a Japanese kickboxing promotion.

RISE events are streamed on online service Abema TV.

== List of events ==
#	Event title	Date	Arena	Location
1	RISE 175	January 14, 2024	Korakuen Hall	Tokyo, Japan
2	RISE 176	February 23, 2024	Korakuen Hall	Tokyo, Japan
3	RISE ELDORADO 2024	March 17, 2024	Tokyo Metropolitan Gymnasium	Tokyo, Japan
4	RISE 177	April 21, 2024	Korakuen Hall	Tokyo, Japan
5	RISE EVOL.12	April 12, 2024	Otemachi Mitsui Hall	Tokyo, Japan
6	RISE 178	May 19, 2024	Korakuen Hall	Tokyo, Japan
7	RISE WORLD SERIES 2024 OSAKA	June 15, 2024	EDION Arena Osaka	Osaka, Japan
8	RISE 179	June 30, 2024	Korakuen Hall	Tokyo, Japan
9	RISE 180	July 26, 2024	Korakuen Hall	Tokyo, Japan
10	RISE 181	August 31, 2024	Korakuen Hall	Tokyo, Japan
11	RISE WORLD SERIES 2024 YOKOHAMA	September 8, 2024	Yokohama Buntai	Yokohama, Japan
12	RISE Fight Club 2	October 5, 2024	Non disclosed	Tokyo, Japan
13	RISE 182	October 20, 2024	Korakuen Hall	Tokyo, Japan
14	RISE 183	November 29, 2024	Korakuen Hall	Tokyo, Japan
15	RISE 184	December 15, 2024	Korakuen Hall	Tokyo, Japan
16	GLORY RISE Featherweight Grand Prix	December 21, 2024	Makuhari Messe	Yokohama, Japan

== RISE 2024 Awards ==
- RISE Fighter of the Year 2024: Ryujin Nasukawa
- RISE Fight of the Year 2024: Haruto Yasumoto vs. Keisuke Monguchi (RISE 182)
- RISE Knockout of the Year 2024: Panuwat TGT vs. Taisei Iwago (RISE 177)
- RISE Rookie of the Year 2024: Ryunosuke Hosokoshi
- RISE Gym of the Year: Oishi Gym

== RISE 175 ==
RISE 175
- Promotion: RISE
- Date: January 14, 2024
- Venue: Korakuen Hall
- City: Tokyo, Japan

RISE 175 was a kickboxing event held by RISE at the Korakuen Hall in Tokyo, Japan on January 14, 2024.

=== Background ===
The main event featured the RISE Super Featherweight (-60kg) Champion Chan Hyung Lee defending his title against Taiga.

=== Fight Card ===
RISE 175
Weight Class				Method	Round	Time	Notes
Bantamweight 55 kg	(Japan) Taiga	def.	(South Korea) Chan Hyung Lee (c)	Decision (Unanimous)	5	3:00	For the RISE Super Featherweight (-60kg) Champion
Catchweight 49.5 kg	(Japan) Arina Kobayashi	def.	(Taiwan) Wang Chin Long	KO (Body punches)	2	1:32	
Super Lightweight 65 kg	(Japan) Sota kimura	def.	(Japan) Chappy Yoshinuma	Decision (Unanimous)	3	3:00	
Featherweight 57.5 kg	(Japan) Kakeru	def.	(Japan) Kensei Yamakawa	KO (Body punches)	2	1:22	
Kazuma retirement ceremony
Bantamweight 55 kg	(Japan) Tsubasa Wakahara	def.	(Japan) Kazuhiro Matsuyama	Decision (Unanimous)	3	3:00	
Featherweight 57.5 kg	(Japan) Masamitsu Kutsuwa	def.	(Japan) Hiroya Oshima	KO (Right cross)	2	2:38	
Super Featherweight 60 kg	(Japan) Hikaru Fujihashi	vs.	(Japan) Aito	No Contest (Low blow)	1	1:01	
Super Featherweight 60 kg	(Japan) Andrei Haraguchi	def.	(Japan) Ryusho Toda	KO (Right cross)	2	2:54	
Bantamweight 55 kg	(Japan) Tomomi Yamamoto	draw.	(Japan) RINA	Decision (Majority)	3	3:00	
Atomweight 46 kg	(Japan) Yuika Iwanaga	def.	(Japan) Minori Kikuchi	Decision (Majority)	3	3:00	
Bantamweight 55 kg	(Japan) Shoma Okumura	def.	(Japan) Yusei Horimoto	Decision (Majority)	3	3:00	

== RISE 176 ==
RISE 176
- Promotion: RISE
- Date: February 23, 2024
- Venue: Korakuen Hall
- City: Tokyo, Japan

RISE 176 is a kickboxing event that will be held by RISE, on February 23, 2024, at the Korakuen Hall in Tokyo, Japan.

=== Background ===
The main event features the reigning RISE Flyweight (-51.5kg) Champion Riku Kazushima in a 52 kg catchweight non-title bout against Khunsuk Petchyindee.

=== Fight Card ===
RISE 176
Weight Class				Method	Round	Time	Notes
Catchweight 52 kg	(Japan) Riku Kazushima	def.	(Thailand) Khunsuk Petchyindee	Ext.R Decision (Unanimous)	4	3:00	
Featherweight 57.5 kg	(Japan) Haruto Yasumoto	def.	(Japan) Taisei Umei	Decision (Majority)	3	3:00	
Super Flyweight 53 kg	(Japan) Kaito Hasegawa	def.	(Thailand) Sanchai TeppenGym	KO (Punches)	3	2:31	
Flyweight 51.5 kg	(Japan) Momu Tsukamoto	def.	(Japan) Jin	Decision (Unanimous)	3	3:00	
Flyweight 51.5 kg	(Japan) Ryuta Suekuni	def.	(Japan) Reiya	Ext.R Decision (Unanimous)	4	3:00	
Lightweight 63 kg	(Japan) Sumiya Ito	def.	(Japan) Yamato Ashikaga	KO (Right cross)	2	2:39	
Super Lightweight 65 kg	(Japan) Yutaro Asahi	def.	(Japan) Taichi Nomura	Decision (Unanimous)	3	3:00	
Atomweight 46 kg	(Japan) Honoka Kobayashi	vs.	(Japan) Momoka	Decision (Unanimous)	3	3:00	
Bantamweight 55 kg	(Japan) Ryoya Ito	def.	(Japan) Ryu Matsunaga	TKO (Doctor stoppage)	3		
Featherweight 57.5 kg	(Japan) Kenichi Takeuchi	def.	(Japan) Shoma	Decision (Majority)	3	3:00	
Welterweight 67.5 kg	(Japan) Hiroshi Noguchi	def.	(Japan) Ryu Nakamura	TKO (Referee stoppage)	3		
Flyweight 51.5 kg	(Japan) Dangan Futa	def.	(Japan) BlackShisa Sotaro	Decision (Unanimous)	3	3:00	
Featherweight 57.5 kg	(Japan) Retsu Sashida	def.	(Japan) Yuto Nomura	Decision (Unanimous)	3	3:00	

== Rise eldorado 2024 ==
RISE ELDORADO 2024
- Promotion: RISE
- Date: March 17, 2024
- Venue: Tokyo Metropolitan Gymnasium
- City: Tokyo, Japan

RISE Eldorado 2024 is a kickboxing event that was held by RISE, on March 17, 2024, at the Tokyo Metropolitan Gymnasium in Tokyo, Japan.

=== Background ===
The main event will feature the RISE Bantamweight (-55kg) World champion Shiro defending his title against 2023 RISE -54 kg World Series Tournament winner Toki Tamaru. The event will also feature five matchups opposing RISE and K-1 fighters.

=== Fight Card ===
RISE ELDORADO 2024
Weight Class				Method	Round	Time	Notes
Bantamweight 55 kg	(Japan) Shiro (c)	nc.	(Japan) Toki Tamaru	Doctor stop. (Head clash)	1	3:00	For the RISE Bantamweight (-55kg) World title
Super Lightweight 65 kg	(Portugal) Miguel Trindade	def.	(Australia) Chadd Collins	TKO (3 Knockdowns)	1		
Super Lightweight 65 kg	(South Korea) Lee Sung-hyun	def.	(Japan) Taiju Shiratori	Decision (Majority)	3	3:00	
Catchweight 53.5 kg	(Japan) Kazuki Osaki (c)	def.	(France) Djillali Kharroubi	Decision (Unanimous)	5	3:00	For the ISKA Oriental rules World Flyweight title
Lightweight 63 kg	(Japan) Yuki Yoza	def.	(Japan) Kan Nakamura	Tech.Decision (Majority)	3		RISE vs K-1
Bantamweight 55 kg	(Japan) Akihiro Kaneko	def.	(Japan) Masahiko Suzuki	Decision (Unanimous)	3	3:00	RISE vs K-1
Super Flyweight 53 kg	(Japan) Ryu Hanaoka	def.	(Japan) Koji Ikeda	Decision (Unanimous)	3	3:00	RISE vs K-1
Lightweight 63 kg	(Japan) Hyu	def.	(Japan) Ryuka	Decision (Unanimous)	3	3:00	RISE vs K-1
Super lightweight 65 kg	(Japan) Koya Saito	def.	(Japan) Yuki Tanaka	KO (Right cross)	2	1:19	RISE vs K-1
Bantamweight 55 kg	(Japan) Ryunosuke Omori	def.	(Japan) Koyata Yamada	KO (Spinning back fist)	1	2:16	
Flyweight 51.5 kg	(Japan) Ryujin Nasukawa	def.	(Japan) Tenshi Matsumoto	Decision (Unanimous)	3	3:00	
Bantamweight 55 kg	(Thailand) Jaroensuk BoonlannaMuaythai	def.	(Japan) Yugo Kato	Decision (Unanimous)	3	3:00	
Super Lightweight 65 kg	(Japan) YURA	def.	(Japan) Kenta	Decision (Unanimous)	3	3:00	
Bantamweight 55 kg	(Japan) Musashi Matsushita	def.	(Japan) Ryuya Ito	Ext.R Decision (Majority)	4	3:00	
	(Japan) Koki Osaki	vs.	(Japan) Norio Yokoyama		2	2:00	Exhibition
Preliminary Card
Lightweight 63 kg	(Japan) Taku	def.	(Japan) Yuta Take	KO (Right cross)	1	2:10	
Mini Flyweight 49 kg	(Japan) Yun Toshima	def.	(Japan) Saaya	Decision (Majority)	3	3:00	
Super Flyweight 53 kg	(Japan) Fuga Tokoro	def.	(Japan) Shoma Okumura	Decision (Majority)	3	3:00	

== RISE 177 ==
RISE 177
- Promotion: RISE
- Date: April 21, 2024
- Venue: Korakuen Hall
- City: Tokyo, Japan

RISE 177 is a kickboxing event that was held by RISE, on April 21, 2024, at the Korakuen Hall in Tokyo, Japan.

=== Background ===
A RISE Welterweight title bout between Ryota Nakano and Ryoya Inai was expected to serve as the main event. The title bout was cancelled following Inai's injury. A super featherweight tournament was booked in its place.

=== Fight Card ===
RISE 177
Weight Class				Method	Round	Time	Notes
Super Featherweight 60 kg	(Thailand) Panuwat TGT	def.	(Japan) Taisei Iwago	KO (High kick)	2	1:02	Otokogi Tournament Final
Bantamweight 55 kg	(Japan) Yuki Kyotani	def.	(Japan) Rasta	Decision (Unanimous)	3	3:00	
Featherweight 57.5 kg	(Japan) Shuto Miyazaki	def.	(Japan) Kenshin Yamamoto	Decision (Unanimous)	3	3:00	
Lightweight 63 kg	(Japan) Ryuto Shiokawa	def.	(Japan) Rikuto Tanaka	Decision (Unanimous)	3	3:00	
Lightweight 63 kg	(Japan) Masahito Okuyama	def.	(Japan) Yusuke Iwaki	Decision (Majority)	3	3:00	
Bantamweight 55 kg	(Japan) Hyuga	def.	(Japan) Ryuga Natsume	KO (Left hook)	3	2:56	
Super Featherweight 60 kg	(Japan) Taisei iwago	def.	(Japan) Katsuji	Decision (Unanimous)	3	3:00	Otokogi Tournament Semifinal
Super Featherweight 60 kg	(Thailand) Panuwat TGT	def.	(Japan) Ryo Takahashi	KO (Left hook)	1	3:00	Otokogi Tournament Semifinal
W.Mini Flyweight 49 kg	(Japan) Mei Miyamoto	def.	(Japan) Wakana Miyazaki	Decision (Unanimous)	3	3:00	
W.Atomweight 46 kg	(Japan) Honoka Tsujii	def.	(Japan) Miyuu Sakata	Decision (Unanimous)	3	3:00	
Super Lightweight 65 kg	(Japan) Shota	def.	(Japan) Henmi 9	TKO (Referee stoppage)	3	0:17	

== RISE EVOL.12 ==
RISE EVOL.12
- Promotion: RISE
- Date: May 12, 2024
- Venue: Korakuen Hall
- City: Tokyo, Japan

RISE EVOL.12 is a kickboxing event that was held by RISE, on May 12, 2024, at the Korakuen Hall in Tokyo, Japan.

=== Fight Card ===
RISE EVOL.12
Weight Class				Method	Round	Time	Notes
Lightweight 63 kg	(Japan) TAKU	def.	(Japan) Ryuki Yoshioka	Decision (Majority)	3	3:00	
Bantamweight 55 kg	(Japan) Tomoya Fukui	def.	(Japan) Kyosuke	Decision (Unanimous)	3	3:00	
Flyweight 51.5 kg	(Japan) Yuto Hirayama	def.	(Japan) Toranosuke Matsuda	TKO (Punches)	1	1:39	
Super Flyweight 63 kg	(Japan) Raize	draw.	(Japan) Jo Aizawa	Decision (Unanimous)	3	3:00	
Atomweight 46 kg	(Japan) Runa Okumura	def.	(Japan) Minori Kikuchi	Decision (Unanimous)	3	3:00	
Mini Flyweight 49 kg	(Japan) Nanaka Honda	def.	(Japan) Mai Hanada	Decision (Unanimous)	3	3:00	
Featherweight 57.5 kg	(Japan) Shinnosuke Nagamatsu	def.	(Japan) Shintaro	Decision (Unanimous)	3	3:00	

== RISE 178 ==
RISE 178
- Promotion: RISE
- Date: May 19, 2024
- Venue: Otemachi Mitsui Hall
- City: Tokyo, Japan

RISE 178 is a kickboxing event that was held by RISE, on May 19, 2024, at the Otemachi Mitsui Hall in Tokyo, Japan.

=== Background ===
A non-title bout between RISE Bantamweight (-55kg) Champion Koki Osaki and Aiman Lahmar was initially scheduled as the main event, Lahmar was later replaced by WAKO Pro World champion Samvel Babayan. A non-title bout between current and former RISE Queen Mini Flyweight (-49kg) Champion Arina Kobayashi and Manazo Kobayashi served as the co-main event.

=== Fight Card ===
RISE 178
Weight Class				Method	Round	Time	Notes
Catchweight 50 kg	(Japan) Arina Kobayashi	def.	(Japan) Manazo Kobayashi	Decision (Unanimous)	3	3:00	Open finger gloves match
Catchweight 58 kg	(Japan) Koki Osaki	def.	(Thailand) Yodbuadaeng 3rdPlace	KO (Left hook to the body)	2	1:49	
Flyweight 51.5 kg	(Japan) Reiya	def.	(Japan) Yuzuki Sakai	Decision (Unanimous)	3	3:00	
Welterweight 67.5 kg	(Japan) Takumi Sanekata	def.	(Iran) Sasha Tadayoni	Decision (Unanimous)	3	3:00	
Featherweight 57.5 kg	(Japan) Ryoga Terayama	def.	(Japan) Knight Makino	Decision (Unanimous)	3	3:00	
Middleweight 70 kg	(Japan) Taichi Ishikawa	def.	(Japan) Negimajin	Decision (Split)	3	3:00	
Heavyweight	(Japan) Hidetake Takenaka	def.	(Japan) MAX Yoshida	KO (Right straight)	1	0:42	
Super featherweight 60 kg	(Northern Ireland) Jay Snoddon	def.	(Japan) Norio Yokoyama	Decision (Unanimous)	3	3:00	
Super flyweight 53 kg	(Japan) Haruto Yokoyama	def.	(Japan) Kosei Tanaka	Decision (Unanimous)	3	3:00	
Super Featherweight 60 kg	(Japan) Ryunosuke Hosokoshi	def.	(Japan) Taku Takawa	KO			
Lightweight 63 kg	(Japan) Haruto Nio	def.	(Japan) Noboru Kuboyama	Decision (Unanimous)	3	3:00	
Lightweight 63 kg	(Japan) Ranma	draw.	(Japan) Tsubasa Nio	Decision (Majority)	3	3:00	

== RISE WORLD SERIES 2024 Osaka ==
RISE WORLD SERIES 2024 OSAKA
- Promotion: RISE
- Date: June 15, 2024
- Venue: EDION Arena Osaka
- City: Osaka, Japan

RISE WORLD SERIES 2024 OSAKA is a kickboxing event that was held by RISE, on June 15, 2024, at the EDION Arena Osaka in Osaka, Japan.

=== Background ===
The event was headlined by a RISE Super Flyweight title bout between champion Kazuki Osaki and challenger Jin Mandokoro.

=== Fight Card ===
RISE WORLD SERIES 2024 OSAKA
Weight Class				Method	Round	Time	Notes
Super Flyweight 53 kg	(Japan) Kazuki Osaki (c)	def.	(Japan) Jin Mandokoro	Decision (Unanimous)	5	3:00	For the RISE Super Flyweight title
Lightweight 63 kg	(Japan) Kan Nakamura	def.	(Brazil) Thalisson Ferreira	TKO (3 Knockdowns)	3		
Welterweight 67.5 kg	(Japan) Ryota Nakano	draw.	(Japan) Meison Hide Usami	Tech. Decision (Majority)	2		
Catchweight 52 kg	(Japan) Riku Kazushima	def.	(Thailand) Sudlor SorJor.Tongprachin	KO (Body punches)	3	2:25	
Flyweight 51.5 kg	(Japan) Ryujin Nasukawa	def.	(Japan) Momu Tsukamoto	Decision (Split)	3	3:00	
Catchweight 61.5 kg	(Japan) Taiga	def.	(Spain) Daniel Puertas	Decision (Unanimous)	3	3:00	
Super Flyweight 53 kg	(Japan) Toki Tamaru	def.	(South Korea) Hyeonwoo Jung	KO (Left body kick)	1	0:36	
Super Lightweight 65 kg	(Japan) Taiju Shiratori	def.	(Moldova) Petru Morari	Decision (Unanimous)	3	3:00	
Light Heavyweight 90 kg	(Japan) Kenta Nanbara	def.	(Australia) Jesse Astill	KO (Left body kick)	3	0:58	
Super Lightweight 65 kg	(Japan) Hiroto Yamaguchi	def.	(Japan) Sumiya Ito	TKO (3 Knockdowns)	2	1:45	Open finger gloves match
Middleweight 70 kg	(Japan) YUYA	def.	(Thailand) Singphayak Hama Gym	KO (Left hook to the body)	3	0:34	
Featherweight 57.5 kg	(Japan) Kengo	def.	(Japan) King Ryuzo	Decision (Unanimous)	3	3:00	
Super Flyweight 53 kg	(Japan) JIN	def.	(Japan) Aoi Noda	KO (injury)	3	1:47	
Prelims
Flyweight 51.5 kg	(Japan) King Rikuto	def.	(Japan) Ryunosuke Ito	TKO (Punches)	1	2:36	
Super Lightweight 65 kg	(Japan) Shota	def.	(Japan) Keiji Matsumoto	KO (Knees)	2	1:36	
Featherweight 57.5 kg	(Japan) Kabuto	def.	(Japan) Aoi Kadowaki	Decision (Majority)	3	3:00	
Women Atomweight 46 kg	(Japan) Amiru Yamasaki	def.	(Japan) Juna Koda	Decision (Majority)	3	3:00	

== RISE 179 ==
RISE 179
- Promotion: RISE
- Date: June 30, 2024
- Venue: Korakuen Hall
- City: Tokyo, Japan

RISE 179 is a kickboxing event that was held by RISE, on June 30, 2024, at the Korakuen Hall in Tokyo, Japan.

=== Background ===
A bantamweight bout between Shiro and Christian Manzo was booked as the event headliner.

=== Fight Card ===
RISE 179
Weight Class				Method	Round	Time	Notes
Bantamweight 55 kg	(Japan) Shiro	def.	(Argentina) Christian Manzo	Decision (Unanimous)	3	3:00	
Super Flyweight 53 kg	(Japan) Ryu Hanaoka	def.	(Japan) Kaito Hasegawa	Decision (Unanimous)	3	3:00	
Flyweight 51.5 kg	(Japan) Tenshi Matsumoto	def.	(Japan) Yuki Kishi	KO (Left hook)	1	1:04	
Featherweight 57.5 kg	(Japan) Taisei Umei	def.	(Japan) Kakeru	Decision (Unanimous)	3	3:00	
Bantamweight 55 kg	(Japan) Musashi Matsushita	def.	(Japan) Tsubasa Wakahara	TKO (3 Knockdowns)	2	2:20	
Middleweight 70 kg	(Japan) Hirokatsu Miyagi	def.	(Brazil) Pedro Gomes	KO (Right hook)	2	1:20	
Super Featherweight 60 kg	(Japan) Masaki Ono	def.	(Japan) Shigeki Fujii	Decision (Unanimous)	3	3:00	
Super Featherweight 60 kg	(Japan) Shota Okudaira	def.	(Japan) Andrei Haraguchi	Ext.R Decision (Unanimous)	4	3:00	
Lightweight 63 kg	(Japan) Tsubasa Nio	def.	(Japan) Yudai Arai	Decision (Unanimous)	3	3:00	
Women Mini Flyweight 49 kg	(Taiwan) Wang Chin Long	def.	(Japan) Melty Kira	Decision (Unanimous)	3	3:00	
Welterweight 67.5 kg	(Japan) Takamasa Abiko	def.	(Japan) Sho Nishida	KO (Right cross)	2	0:28	

== RISE 180 ==
RISE 180
- Promotion: RISE
- Date: July 26, 2024
- Venue: Korakuen Hall
- City: Tokyo, Japan

RISE 180 is a kickboxing event that was held by RISE, on July 26, 2024, at the Korakuen Hall in Tokyo, Japan.

=== Background ===
A women's atomweight bout between Koyuki Miyazaki and the former WBC light flyweight champion Samson C2M Muaythai&Fitness headlined the event.

=== Fight Card ===
RISE 180
Weight Class				Method	Round	Time	Notes
Atomweight 46 kg	(Japan) Koyuki Miyazaki	def.	(Thailand) Samson C2M Muaythai&Fitness	TKO (Referee stoppage)	2	2:17	
Super lightweight 65 kg	(Japan) Yutaro Asahi	def.	(Thailand) Franck Chan	KO (Right hook)	2	0:27	
Featherweight 57.5 kg	(Japan) Daiki Toita	def.	(Japan) Shuto Miyazaki	Decision (Unanimous)	3	3:00	
Flyweight 51.5 kg	(Japan) Ryuta Suekuni	def.	(Japan) Yuto Hirayama	Decision (Unanimous)	3	3:00	
Bantamweight 55 kg	(Japan) Ryoya Ito	def.	(Japan) Tomoya Fukui	Decision (Unanimous)	3	3:00	
W.Flyweight 52 kg	(Japan) Yaya Weerasakreck	def.	(Japan) Ruka	Decision (Unanimous)	3	3:00	
Featherweight 57.5 kg	(Japan) Masamitsu Kutsuwa	def.	(Japan) Kenshi Yamamoto	TKO (3 Knockdowns)	2	1:29	
Featherweight 57.5 kg	(Japan) Retsu Sashida	def.	(Japan) Iwa King	Decision (Unanimous)	3	3:00	
Super featherweight 60 kg	(Japan) Ryunosuke Hosokoshi	def.	(Japan) Masaya Katsuno	KO (Knee)	1	0:29	
Atomweight 46 kg	(Japan) Fuu	def.	(Japan) Honoka Kobayashi	Ext.R Decision (Unanimous)	4	3:00	
Atomweight 46 kg	(Japan) Haruka Shimada	def.	(Japan) Amiru Yamasaki	Decision (Unanimous)	3	3:00	

== RISE 181 ==
RISE 181
- Promotion: RISE
- Date: August 31, 2024
- Venue: Korakuen Hall
- City: Tokyo, Japan

RISE 181 is a kickboxing event held by RISE, on August 31, 2024, at the Korakuen Hall in Tokyo, Japan.

=== Background ===
A RISE Bantamweight (-55kg) title bout between Koki Osaki and Ryunosuke Omori was booked as the event headliner.

=== Fight Card ===
RISE 181
Weight Class				Method	Round	Time	Notes
Bantamweight 55 kg	(Japan) Koki Osaki (c)	def.	(Japan) Ryunosuke Omori	Decision (Unanimous)	5	3:00	For the RISE Bantamweight (-55kg) title
Catchweight 52 kg	(Japan) Tenshi Matsumoto	def.	(Japan) JIN	KO (Left cross)	1	2:37	
Super Featherweight 60 kg	(Japan) Seido	def.	(Japan) Katsuji	Decision (Split)	3	3:00	
Super Featherweight 60 kg	(Japan) Taisei Kondo	def.	(Japan) Ryuya Koide	Decision (Unanimous)	3	3:00	
Featherweight 57.5 kg	(Thailand) Auto Nor.Naksin	def.	(Japan) Kengo	Ext. R. Decision (Unanimous)	4	3:00	
Lightweight 62.5 kg	(Japan) TAKU	def.	(Japan) Kazuki Takeichi	TKO (Left hook to the body)	2	1:03	
Mini Flyweight 49 kg	(Japan) Mei Miyamoto	def.	(Japan) Melty Kira	Decision (Unanimous)	3	3:00	
Atomweight 46 kg	(Japan) Runa Okumura	def.	(Japan) Momoka	Decision (Unanimous)	3	3:00	
Super Lightweight 65 kg	(Japan) Genki Morimoto	def.	(Japan) Hiroshi Noguchi	TKO (Punches)	1	1:35	
Super Flyweight 53 kg	(Japan) Yuga Hoshi	def.	(Japan) Hiroto Yokoyama	Decision (Unanimous)	3	3:00	

== Rise world series 2024 yokohama ==
RISE WORLD SERIES 2024 YOKOHAMA
- Promotion: RISE
- Date: September 8, 2024
- Venue: Yokohama Buntail
- City: Yokohama, Japan

RISE WORLD SERIES 2024 YOKOHAMA is a kickboxing event that was held by RISE, on September 8, 2024, at the Yokohama Buntai in Yokohama, Japan.

=== Background ===
A rematch between Shiro and Toki Tamaru for the RISE Bantamweight (-55kg) World title was scheduled as the main event.

=== Fight Card ===
RISE WORLD SERIES 2024 YOKOHAMA
Weight Class				Method	Round	Time	Notes
Bantamweight 55 kg	(Japan) Shiro (c)	def.	(Japan) Toki Tamaru	Decision (Unanimous)	5	3:00	For the RISE Bantamweight (-55kg) World title
Catchweight 61.5 kg	(Japan) Kan Nakamura	def.	(China) Yuan Pengjie	Ext.R Decision (Unanimous)	4	3:00	
Super Lightweight 65 kg	(Australia) Chadd Collins	def.	(Japan) Yutaro Asahi	KO (Right cross)	1	2:22	
Super Lightweight 65 kg	(South Korea) Lee Sung-hyun	def.	(Japan) Ryota Nakano	Decision (Majority)	3	3:00	
Super Lightweight 65 kg	(Japan) Taiju Shiratori	def.	(Thailand) Faphayap Grabs	KO (Knee to the body)	1	1:43	
Super Flyweight 53 kg	(Japan) Ryujin Nasukawa	def.	(South Korea) Shin Jung Min	KO (Left hook to the body)	2	0:27	
Featherweight 57.5 kg	(Japan) Yuta Kunieda	def.	(Japan) Taisei Umei	Decision (Unanimous)	3	3:00	
Catchweight 61.5 kg	(Japan) Hyuma Hitachi	def.	(Kazakhstan) Alisher Karmenov	Decision (Majority)	3	3:00	
Welterweight 67.5 kg	(Japan) Takumi Sanekata	def.	(Moldova) Petru Morari	Decision (Unanimous)	3	3:00	
Bantamweight 55 kg	(Japan) Yugo Kato	def.	(Japan) Musashi Matsushita	Decision (Majority)	3	3:00	
Super Flyweight 53 kg	(Japan) Momu Tsukamoto	def.	(Japan) Dangan Futa	KO (Spinning backfist)	1	0:43	
Super Featherweight 60 kg	(Japan) Ryunosuke Hosokoshi	def.	(Japan) Shota Okudaira	KO (Right hook)	1	1:13	
Bantamweight 55 kg	(Japan) Rasta	def.	(Japan) Hyuga	Decision (Unanimous)	3	3:00	
Prelims
Flyweight 51.5 kg	(Japan) Yuzuki Sakai	def.	(Japan) Rui Nojima	Decision (Unanimous)	3	3:00	
Mini Flyweight 49 kg	(Japan) Wakana Miyazaki	draw.	(Japan) Yun Toshima	Decision (Split)	3	3:00	
Lightweight 63 kg	(Japan) Yuga Sugita	def.	(Japan) G-REX	Decision (Unanimous)	3	3:00	

== RISE Fight Club 2 ==
RISE Fight Club 2
- Promotion: RISE
- Date: October 5, 2024
- Venue: Non disclosed
- City: Tokyo, Japan

RISE Fight Club 2 is a kickboxing event that will be held by RISE, on October 5, 2024, in Tokyo, Japan.

=== Fight Card ===
RISE Fight Club 2
Weight Class				Method	Round	Time	Notes
Super Lightweight 65 kg	(Japan) YURA	def.	(Japan) Sota Cerberus Kimura	KO (Right hook)	3	0:14	
Catchweight 84 kg	(Japan) Daichi Abe	def.	(Thailand) Kongtualai JMBoxingGym}	Decision (Unanimous)	3	3:00	
Catchweight 67.5 kg	(Japan) Hiroto Yamaguchi	def.	(Japan) Takamasa Abiko	Decision (Unanimous)	3	3:00	
Bantamweight 70 kg	(Japan) Momu Tsukamoto	def.	(Japan) Ryoya Ito	Decision (Unanimous)	3	3:00	
Lightweight 63 kg	(Japan) MAX Yoshida	def.	(Japan) Hikaru Sato	KO (right uppercut)	2	2:00	
Super Featherweight 60 kg	(Japan) Saigo	def.	(Japan) Kenta Tanoue	KO	2	1:10	

== RISE 182 ==
RISE 182
- Promotion: RISE
- Date: October 20, 2024
- Venue: Korakuen Hall
- City: Tokyo, Japan

RISE 182 is a kickboxing event that will be held by RISE, on October 20, 2024, at the Korakuen Hall in Tokyo, Japan.

=== Background ===
RISE Featherweight (-57.5kg) title bout between champion Keisuke Monguchi and challenger Haruto Yasumoto served as the main event.

=== Fight Card ===
RISE 182
Weight Class				Method	Round	Time	Notes
Featherweight 57.5 kg	(Japan) Haruto Yasumoto	def.	(Japan) Keisuke Monguchi (c)	Decision (Unanimous)	5	3:00	For the RISE Featherweight title
W.Flyweight 52 kg	(Japan) Arina Kobayashi	def.	(South Korea) Bo-Kyeong Byun	Decision (Unanimous)	3	3:00	
Middleweight 70 kg	(Japan) YUYA	def.	(Japan) Hirokatsu Miyagi	Decision (Unanimous)	3	3:00	
Middleweight 70 kg	(Slovenia) Samo Petje	def.	(Japan) Motoyasukku	Ext.R Decision (Unanimous)	4	3:00	
Akari retirement ceremony
Welterweight 67.5 kg	(Japan) Takumi Sanekata	def.	(Japan) Taichi Ishikawa	KO (Right hook)	3	2:58	
Lightweight 63 kg	(Japan) TAKU	def.	(Japan) Takuma	Decision (Split)	3	3:00	
Featherweight 57.5 kg	(Japan) Shun Shiraishi	def.	(Japan) Kenichi Takeuchi	Decision (Unanimous)	3	3:00	
Super Featherweight 60 kg	(Japan) Ryo Takahashi	def.	(Japan) Ryuta Inoue	Decision (Unanimous)	3	3:00	
Bantamweight 55 kg	(Japan) Ryuga Natsume	def.	(Japan) Ryu Matsunaga	Decision (Unanimous)	3	3:00	
Women's Flyweight 52 kg	(Japan) Yuika Iwanaga	draw.	(Japan) Yura	Decision (Unanimous)	3	3:00	
Lightweight 63 kg	(Japan) Yuta Take	draw.	(Japan) Tsubasa Nio	Decision (Majority)	3	3:00	
Super Featherweight 60 kg	(Japan) Taku Takaiwa	def.	(Japan) Yutaro Hori	TKO (Corner stoppage)	2	2:44	

== RISE 183 ==
RISE 183
- Promotion: RISE
- Date: November 23, 2024
- Venue: Korakuen Hall
- City: Tokyo, Japan

RISE 183 is a kickboxing event that will be held by RISE, on November 23, 2024, at the Korakuen Hall in Tokyo, Japan.

=== Background ===
A RISE Flyweight (-51.5kg) title bout between Riku Kazushima and Ryujin Nasukawa was booked as the main event.

=== Fight Card ===
RISE 183
Weight Class				Method	Round	Time	Notes
Flyweight 51.5 kg	(Japan) Ryujin Nasukawa	def.	(Japan) Riku Kazushima (c)	TKO (Left hook)	1	2:12	For the RISE Flyweight (-51.5kg) title
Bantamweight 55 kg	(Japan) Kaito Hasegawa	def.	(Japan) Yuki Kyotani	TKO (Leg injury)	1		
Lightweight 63 kg	(Japan) Kyoto Takahashi	def.	(Japan) Sumiya Ito	KO (High kick)	1		
Lightweight 63 kg	(Japan) Ryuto Shiokawa	def.	(Japan) Tomohiro Kitai	Decision (Unanimous)	3	3:00	
Hideki retirement ceremony
Featherweight 57.5 kg	(Japan) Kakeru	def.	(Japan) Masamitsu Kutsuwa	TKO (Corner stoppage)	1	1:40	
Featherweight 57.5 kg	(Japan) Ryoga Terayama	def.	(Japan) King Ryuzo	TKO (Left hook)	3	2:33	
Super Featherweight 60 kg	(Japan) GUMP	def.	(Japan) Taisei Iwago	KO (Left high kick)	2		
Welterweight 67.5 kg	(Japan) Teppei Wada	def.	(Japan) Kyowlow	KO (Low kick)	2		
Mini Flyweight 49 kg	(Japan) Yun Toshima	def.	(Taiwan) Wang Chin Long	Ext.R Decision (Majority)	4	3:00	
Super Flyweight 53 kg	(Japan) Yuga Hoshi	def.	(Japan) Atsuki Yamada	Decision (Split)	3	3:00	

== RISE 184 ==
RISE 184
- Promotion: RISE
- Date: December 15, 2024
- Venue: Korakuen Hall
- City: Tokyo, Japan

RISE 184 is a kickboxing event that will be held by RISE, on December 15, 2024, at the Korakuen Hall in Tokyo, Japan.

=== Fight Card ===
RISE 184
Weight Class				Method	Round	Time	Notes
Super Flyweight 53 kg	(Japan) Ryu Hanaoka	def.	(Japan) Jin Mandokoro	Decision (Unanimous)	5	3:00	For the vacant RISE Super Flyweight title
Women's Flyweight 52 kg	(Netherlands) Tessa De Kom (c)	def.	(Japan) Arina Kobayashi	Decision (Unanimous)	5	3:00	For the RISE Women's Flyweight title
Atomweight 46 kg	(Japan) Koyuki Miyazaki	def.	(Singapore) Tan Xuan Yun	KO (Left high kick)	2	2:58	
Flyweight 51.5 kg	(Japan) Tenshi Matsumoto	def.	(Japan) Reiya	Decision (Unanimous)	3	3:00	
Flyweight 51.5 kg	(Japan) Ryuta Suekuni	def.	(Japan) King Rikuto	Decision (Unanimous)	3	3:00	
Catchweight 58 kg	(Suriname) Dwelbert Manuel	def.	(Japan) Daiki Toita	Decision (Unanimous)	3	3:00	
Super Featherweight 60 kg	(Japan) Ryunosuke Hosokoshi	def.	(Japan) Masaki Ono	TKO (Knees)	2		
Bantamweight 55 kg	(Japan) Tsubasa	def.	(Japan) Kyosuke	Decision (Majority)	3	3:00	
Atomweight 46 kg	(Japan) Koto Hiraoka	def.	(Japan) Runa Okumura	Ext.R Decision (Unanimous)	4	3:00	
Flyweight 51.5 kg	(Japan) Shuri Sakayori	def.	(Japan) Toranosuke Matsuda	Decision (Majority)	3	3:00	
Atomweight 46 kg	(Japan) Haruka Shimada	def.	(Japan) Sea	Decision (Unanimous)	3	3:00	
Light Heavyweight 90 kg	(Japan) Takahiro Kikutani	def.	(Japan) Kazuyayanenkedo	TKO (Low kicks)	3		

== GLORY RISE Featherweight Grand Prix ==
RISE WORLD SERIES 2024 FINAL
- Promotion: RISE; GLORY
- Date: December 21, 2024
- Venue: Makuhari Messe
- City: Chiba, Japan

GLORY RISE Featherweight Grand Prix or RISE WORLD SERIES 2024 FINAL was a kickboxing event that was held by RISE in collaboration with Glory, on December 21, 2024, at the Makuhari Messe in Chiba, Japan.

=== 2024 GLORY RISE Featherweight Grand Prix bracket ===
Quarter-finals
(Japan) Taiju Shiratori	3
(Thailand) Petpanomrung Kiatmuu9	UD
(South Korea) Lee Sung-hyun	MD
(Albania) Berjan Peposhi	3
(Australia) Chadd Collins	UD
(Mexico) Abraham Vidales	3
(Japan) Kento Haraguchi	1
(Portugal) Miguel Trindade	KO

Semi-finals
(Thailand) Petpanomrung Kiatmuu9	UD
(South Korea) Lee Sung-hyun	3
(Australia) Chadd Collins	1
(Portugal) Miguel Trindade	TKO

Final
(Thailand) Petpanomrung Kiatmuu9	SD
(Portugal) Miguel Trindade	3

=== Fight Card ===
RISE WORLD SERIES 2024 Final / GLORY RISE Featherweight Grand Prix
Weight Class				Method	Round	Time	Notes
Super Lightweight 65 kg	(Thailand) Petpanomrung Kiatmuu9	def.	(Portugal) Miguel Trindade	Decision (Split)	3	3:00	GLORY RISE Featherweight Grand Prix Final
Welterweight 67.5 kg	(Canada) Meison Hide Usami	def.	(Japan) Takumi Sanekata	Decision (Unanimous)	5	3:00	for the vacant RISE Welterweight title
Super Flyweight 53 kg	(Japan) Ryujin Nasukawa	def.	(Thailand) Petmai MC.SuperlekMuaythai	KO (Knee to the body)	2	2:06	
Super Lightweight 65 kg	(Portugal) Miguel Trindade	def.	(Australia) Chadd Collins	TKO (2 Knockdowns)	1		GLORY RISE Featherweight Grand Prix Semifinal
Super Lightweight 65 kg	(Thailand) Petpanomrung Kiatmuu9	def.	(South Korea) Lee Sung-hyun	Decision (Unanimous)	3	3:00	GLORY RISE Featherweight Grand Prix Semifinal
Super Flyweight 53 kg	(Japan) Kazuki Osaki	def.	(Spain) Albert Campos	Decision (Unanimous)	3	3:00	
Catchweight 61.5 kg	(Thailand) Panuwat TGT	def.	(South Korea) Chan Hyung Lee	Ext.R Decision (Split)	4	3:00	
Super Lightweight 65 kg	(Portugal) Miguel Trindade	def.	(Japan) Kento Haraguchi	KO (Right cross)	1	3:00	GLORY RISE Featherweight Grand Prix Quarterfinals
Super Lightweight 65 kg	(Australia) Chadd Collins	def.	(Mexico) Abraham Vidales	Decision (Unanimous)	3	3:00	GLORY RISE Featherweight Grand Prix Quarterfinals
Super Lightweight 65 kg	(South Korea) Lee Sung-hyun	def.	(Albania) Berjan Peposhi	Decision (Majority)	3	3:00	GLORY RISE Featherweight Grand Prix Quarterfinals
Super Lightweight 65 kg	(Thailand) Petpanomrung Kiatmuu9	def.	(Japan) Taiju Shiratori	Decision (Unanimous)	3	3:00	GLORY RISE Featherweight Grand Prix Quarterfinals
Super Lightweight 65 kg	(Japan) Yutaro Asahi	def.	(Netherlands) Jan Kaffa	TKO (2 Knockdowns)	3	2	GLORY RISE Featherweight Grand Prix reserve
Catchweight 56 kg	(Japan) Keisuke Monguchi	def.	(Thailand) Auto Nor.Naksin	Decision (Majority)	3	3:00	
Bantamweight 55 kg	(Japan) Masahiko Suzuki	def.	(Philippines) Jhaymie Gayman	KO (Right cross)	1	1:26	
Catchweight 54 kg	(Japan) Musashi Matsushita	def.	(Philippines) Jan-Jan C.Labuayan	KO (Body punch)	3	2:42	
Women's Flyweight 52 kg	(Japan) KOKOZ	def.	(Japan) Yaya Weerasakreck	Decision (Split)	3	3:00	

== See also ==
- 2024 in K-1
- 2024 in ONE Championship
- 2024 in Romanian kickboxing
- 2024 in Wu Lin Feng
- 2024 in Glory
