= Erika (kickboxer) =

Japanese kickboxer

erika♡
- Born: Erika Gibo; February 6, 1990 (age 36); Naha, Japan
- Native name: 宜保枝里香
- Nickname: Miko no Heroine
- Nationality: Japanese
- Height: 161 cm (5 ft 3 1/2 in)
- Weight: 49 kg (108 lb; 7 st 10 lb)
- Style: Kickboxing
- Stance: Southpaw
- Fighting out of: Tomari, Japan
- Team: SHINE Okinawa (kickboxing); THE BLACKBELT JAPAN (MMA)
- Years active: 2018–2024

Kickboxing record
- Total: 16
- Wins: 13
- By knockout: 3
- Losses: 3
- By knockout: 1

Mixed martial arts record
- Total: 4
- Wins: 2
- Losses: 1
- By knockout: 1
- Draws: 1

Erika Gibo (Japanese: 宜保枝里香, Gibo Erika; born February 6, 1990), more popularly known by her ring name erika♡, is a Japanese mixed martial artist and former professional kickboxer. She is the former RISE Women's Mini Flyweight champion.

Between November 2023 and December 2024, she was ranked as a top ten women's strawweight kickboxer in the world according to Beyond Kick.

== Kickboxing career ==
=== Early career ===
erika made her professional debut against Chizuru Nanase at Tenkaichi 92 on November 25, 2018. She won the fight by unanimous decision. erika won all five of her fights in the next two years, amassing an undefeated 5–0 win streak, most notably overcoming Koto Hiraoka at REBELS 65 on August 30, 2020.

erika faced the RISE Women's Mini Flyweight (–49 kg) champion in the quarterfinals of the RISE "Queen of Queens" tournament, held at RISE DEAD OR ALIVE 2020 Yokohama. She lost the fight by a clear unanimous decision.

erika faced MARI in an NJKF Atomweight title eliminator bout at DEEP☆KICK 48 on December 12, 2020. She won the fight by unanimous decision. erika then challenged Momoka Mandokoro for the NJKF Minerva Atomweight (–46 kg) Championship at DEEP☆KICK Minerva Osaka Tournament on January 30, 2021. She won the fight by unanimous decision.

erika made her KNOCK OUT debut against Shoko at KNOCK OUT-EX vol.2 on June 12, 2021. She won the fight by unanimous decision, with three scorecards of 30–27. erika returned to NJKF to face Ayaka in a non-title bout at NJKF 2021 3rd on September 19, 2021. She won the fight by unanimous decision, with three scorecards of 30–28.

=== RISE ===
==== Move up in weight ====
erika moved up to mini-flyweight, following her final fight under the NJKF banner, and was scheduled to face AKARI at RISE 153 on December 12, 2021. The fight was ruled a draw by unanimous decision after the first three rounds were contested. erika was awarded a unanimous decision win after an extra fourth round was fought.

erika, at the time the #1 ranked RISE mini flyweight contender, was booked to face the #3 ranked contender Wakana Miyazaki at RISE Girls Power 6 on February 12, 2022. She lost the fight by majority decision, with scores of 29–28, 29–27 and 28–28.

==== Mini flyweight champion ====
On March 25, 2023, it was announced that a mini flyweight tournament would be held to crown a new RISE champion, as the reigning RISE Women's Mini Flyweight (–49 kg) champion Hinata Terayama had vacated her title. erika was booked to face Moe Okura in the tournament semifinals, which were held on April 24, 2023. She won the fight by a second-round knockout. erika faced the one-time RISE Mini Flyweight title challenger AKARI in the tournament finals at RISE 159 on June 24, 2023. She won the fight by unanimous decision, with scores of 50–48, 49–47 and 50–46. erika became the first Okinawa-born champion in RISE history.

erika faced Byun Bo-Kyeong at Tenkaichi 97 on August 20, 2023, following a 14-month absence from professional competition. She won the fight by unanimous decision, with three scorecards of 30–26, having dropped Bo-Kyeong in the second round.

erika made her first RISE Women's Mini Flyweight title defense against the one-time RISE Women's Atomweight title challenger Arina Kobayashi at RISE 173 on November 18, 2023. She lost the fight by a second-round technical knockout.

On October 7, 2024, erika announced her retirement as kickboxer.

== Mixed martial arts career ==
=== Shooto ===
erika made her professional debut against Haruka Yoshinari at Shooto Colors vol.4 on December 15, 2024. She won the fight by unanimous decision.

erika faced the former Jewels Microweight champion Aya Murakami at Shooto 2025 Vol.4 on May 18, 2025. She won the fight by majority decision.

erika faced Mio Shimaya in the opening round of the 2025 Shooto Infinity League at Professional Shooto 2025 Vol.6 on July 21, 2025.

erika faced Chiyo Takamoto in the second round of the 2025 Shooto Infinity League at Shooto Colors Vol.6 on January 18, 2026. She lost the fight by a second-round knockout.

== Championships and accomplishments ==
=== Kickboxing ===
- New Japan Kickboxing Federation
  - 2021 NJKF Minerva Atomweight (–46 kg) Championship
- RISE
  - 2022 RISE Women's Mini Flyweight (–49 kg) Tournament Winner
  - 2022 RISE Women's Mini Flyweight (–49 kg) Championship

=== Mixed martial arts ===
==== Amateur ====
- Shooto
  - 2024 Shooto All Japan Amateur Championship Flyweight Winner

== Mixed martial arts record ==
Professional record breakdown
4 matches	2 wins	1 loss
By knockout	0	1
By decision	2	0
Draws	1	

Res.	Record	Opponent	Method	Event	Date	Round	Time	Location	Notes
Loss	2–1–1	Chiyo Takamoto	KO (slam)	Shooto Colors Vol.6	January 18, 2026	2	0:36	Tokyo, Japan	
Draw	2–0–1	Mio Shimaya	Draw (majority)	Shooto 2025 Vol.6	July 21, 2025	2	5:00	Tokyo, Japan	
Win	2–0	Aya Murakami	Decision (majority)	Shooto 2025 Vol.4	May 18, 2025	2	5:00	Tokyo, Japan	Super Atomweight debut.
Win	1–0	Haruka Yoshinari	Decision (unanimous)	Shooto Colors vol.4	December 15, 2024	2	5:00	Tokyo, Japan	Strawweight debut.

Amateur record breakdown		
1 match	1 win	0 losses
By knockout	1	0

Res.	Record	Opponent	Method	Event	Date	Round	Time	Location	Notes
Win	1–0	Gianna Giaimi	TKO (punches)	2024 Shooto All Japan Amateur Championship	6 October 2024	1	1:16	Odawara, Japan	Won 2024 Shooto All Japan Amateur Flyweight title

== Kickboxing record ==
Professional kickboxing record
13 wins (2 (T)KOs), 3 losses, 0 draws
Date	Result	Opponent	Event	Location	Method	Round	Time
2023-11-18	Loss	(Japan) Arina Kobayashi	RISE 173	Tokyo, Japan	KO (punches)	2	0:11
Loses the RISE Women's Mini Flyweight (–49 kg) Championship.
2023-08-20	Win	(South Korea) Byun Bo-Kyeong	Tenkaichi 97	Okinawa, Japan	Decision (unanimous)	3	3:00
2022-06-24	Win	(Japan) AKARI	RISE 159	Tokyo, Japan	Decision (unanimous)	5	3:00
Wins the RISE Women's Mini Flyweight (–49 kg) Championship.
2022-05-24	Win	(Japan) Moe Okura	RISE 157 - Mini Flyweight Championship Tournament Semifinals	Tokyo, Japan	KO (left knee)	2	2:42
2022-02-12	Loss	(Japan) Wakana Miyazaki	RISE Girls Power 6	Tokyo, Japan	Decision (Majority)	3	3:00
2021-12-12	Win	(Japan) AKARI	RISE 153	Tokyo, Japan	Ext.R. Decision (unanimous)	4	3:00
2021-09-19	Win	(Japan) Ayaka	NJKF 2021 3rd	Tokyo, Japan	Decision (unanimous)	3	2:00
2021-06-12	Win	(Japan) Shoko JSK	KNOCK OUT-EX vol.2	Tokyo, Japan	Decision (unanimous)	3	3:00
2021-01-30	Win	(Japan) Momoka Mandokoro	DEEP☆KICK Minerva Osaka Tournament	Izumiōtsu, Japan	Decision (unanimous)	5	2:00
Wins the NJKF Minerva Atomweight (–46 kg) Championship.
2020-12-12	Win	(Japan) MARI	DEEP☆KICK 48	Izumiōtsu, Japan	Decision (majority)	3	2:00
2020-11-10	Loss	(Japan) Hinata Terayama	RISE DEAD OR ALIVE 2020 Yokohama, Tournament Quarterfinals	Yokohama, Japan	Decision (unanimous)	3	3:00
2020-08-30	Win	(Japan) Koto Hiraoka	REBELS 65	Tokyo, Japan	Decision (unanimous)	3	3:00
2020-03-15	Win	(Japan) Ami	Tenkaichi 96	Uechi, Japan	KO (knee to the body)	1	1:22
2020-01-26	Win	(Japan) Honoka	DUEL 20	Tokyo, Japan	Decision (unanimous)	3	3:00
2019-10-20	Win	(Japan) Kana	MAGNUM 51	Tokyo, Japan	TKO (three knockdowns)	2	1:53
2018-11-25	Win	(Japan) Chizuru Nanase	Tenkaichi 92	Okinawa, Japan	Decision (unanimous)	3	3:00
Legend: Win Loss Draw/no contest Notes

== See also ==
- List of female kickboxers
- List of female mixed martial artists
