= Yun Toshima =

Japanese kickboxer

- Born: 登島 優音; 31 October 2006 (age 19); Kawasaki, Kanagawa, Japan
- Height: 1.58 m (5 ft 2 in)
- Weight: 49 kg (108 lb; 7 st 10 lb)
- Style: Kickboxing, Karate
- Stance: Orthodox
- Team: Team Vasileus (2026 - present); NEXT LEVEL Shibuya (former)
- Years active: 2022 - present

Kickboxing record
- Total: 13
- Wins: 8
- By knockout: 1
- Losses: 2
- By knockout: 0
- Draws: 3

Yun Toshima (Japanese: 登島 優音, Toshima Yun; born 31 October 2006) is a Japanese kickboxer. As of December 2024, she is ranked as the tenth-best women's strawweight kickboxer in the world by Beyond Kickboxing.

== Kickboxing career ==
Toshima faced Saaya at RISE ELDORADO 2024 on March 17, 2024. She won the fight by majority decision, with scores of 30—29, 29—28 and 29—29.

Toshima faced the fourth-ranked RISE women's mini flyweight Wakana Miyazaki at RISE WORLD SERIES 2024 YOKOHAMA on September 8, 2024. The fight was a split decision draw, with one judge awarding Miyazaki a 29—28 scorecard, one judge scoring the bout 29—28 for Toshima, while the third ringside official scored the contest an even 29—29.

Toshima faced Wang Chin long at RISE 183 on November 23, 2024. The fight was ruled a split decision draw following the first three rounds, with scores of 29—28, 29—30 and 29—29. Toshima won the bout by majority decision, after an extra fourth round was contested.

Toshima faced Yura at RISE 186 on February 23, 2025. She won the fight by unanimous decision, with scores of 30—27, 30—28 and 29—27.

== Championships and accomplishments ==
- IKO Kyokushinkaikan
  - 2016 IKO Kanagawa "Bukkon Cup" Kumite 3rd & 4th Grade Winner
  - 2017 IKO Kanagawa "Kintaro Cup" Middle Grade Elementary School Runner-up
  - 2017 IKO Kanagawa "Yokohama Cup" 5th Grade -35 kg Winner
  - 2018 IKO Kanagawa "Kintaro Cup" Upper Grade Elementary School Winner

== Fight record ==
Professional Kickboxing record
8 Wins (1 (T)KO), 2 Losses, 3 Draws
Date	Result	Opponent	Event	Location	Method	Round	Time
2026-10-25	Win	(Japan) Ayuna	GOAT Kickboxing Fes. 3	Tokyo, Japan	Decision (Unanimous)	3	3:00
2025-08-02	Draw	(Japan) Hotaru	RISE WORLD SERIES 2025 Tokyo	Tokyo, Japan	Decision (Split)	3	3:00
2025-02-23	Win	(Japan) Yura	RISE 186	Tokyo, Japan	Decision (Unanimous)	3	3:00
2024-11-23	Win	(Taiwan) Wang Chin long	RISE 183	Tokyo, Japan	Ext.R Decision (Majority)	4	3:00
2024-09-08	Draw	(Japan) Wakana Miyazaki	RISE WORLD SERIES 2024 YOKOHAMA	Yokohama, Japan	Decision (Split)	3	3:00
2024-07-27	Win	(Japan) Momone Sakajiri	KROSS×OVER.27	Tokyo, Japan	Decision (Unanimous)	3	2:00
2024-03-17	Win	(Japan) Saaya	RISE ELDORADO 2024	Tokyo, Japan	Decision (Majority)	3	3:00
2023-12-17	Loss	(Japan) Nanaka Honda	KROSS×OVER.24	Tokyo, Japan	Decision (Unanimous)	3	3:00
2023-10-22	Win	(Japan) Ai Ogiwara	KROSS×OVER.23	Tokyo, Japan	Decision (Split)	3	2:00
2023-08-13	Win	(Japan) Maiko Adachi	KROSS×OVER.22	Tokyo, Japan	TKO (Left hook)	1	1:43
2023-06-23	Loss	(Japan) Runa Okumura	RISE 169	Tokyo, Japan	Decision (Majority)	3	3:00
2023-02-23	Draw	(Japan) RINA	RISE166	Tokyo, Japan	Decision (Unanimous)	3	3:00
2022-10-16	Win	(Japan) Melty Kira	KROSS×OVER.19	Tokyo, Japan	Decision (Split)	3	2:00

== See also ==
- List of female kickboxers
