= Arina Kobayashi =

Japanese kickboxer (born 2000)

- Born: 小林愛理奈; 2 November 2000 (age 26); Kakogawa, Japan
- Height: 1.52 m (5 ft 0 in)
- Weight: 49 kg (108 lb; 7 st 10 lb)
- Style: Kickboxing, Kyokushin
- Stance: Orthodox
- Fighting out of: Osaka, Japan
- Team: Fascinate Fight Team (Kickboxing); Okamura Dojo Himejo Honbu (Karate)

Kickboxing record
- Total: 22
- Wins: 16
- By knockout: 7
- Losses: 5
- By knockout: 0
- Draws: 1

Other information
- Notable relatives: Goki Kobayashi (brother)

Arina Kobayashi (Japanese: 小林愛理奈, Kobayashi Arina; born 2 November 2000) is a Japanese kickboxer. She is the former RISE Women's Mini Flyweight champion and the current KNOCK OUT Red Light Flyweight Champion.

As of November 2023, she was ranked the #3 ranked Flyweight and Strawweight kickboxer as well as the #10 pound for pound female kickboxer in the world by Beyond Kickboxing.

== Kickboxing career ==
Kobayashi made her professional debut against Kira Matsutani at RISE Girls Power 2 on February 11, 2020. The fight was ruled a split decision draw.

On January 17, 2021, RISE held an atomweight "Next Challenger" tournament, in order to determine the next challenger for the RISE Women's Atomweight championship on RISE Girls Power 4. Kobayashi was scheduled to face Nana Okuwaki. She defeated Okuwaki by technical knockout in the third round. She advanced to the finals of the one-day tournament, where she faced Koyuki Miyazaki. She lost the fight by unanimous decision.

On April 17, 2021, Kobayashi faced Koto Hiraoka at RISE 148. She won the fight by majority decision.

Kobayashi was scheduled to challenge Koyuki Miyazaki for her RISE Queen Atomweight Championship at RISE 158 on May 29, 2022. She lost the fight by unanimous decision, with scores of 50–47, 50–46 and 50–46.

On November 2, 2022, Kobayashi made her debut in the -49 kg division at RISE EVOL 11 against Wakana Miyazaki. She won the fight by unanimous decision.

Kobayashi rematched Koto Hiaroka in an open finger gloves bout at RISE 163 on December 10, 2022. She won the fight by unanimous decision.

On February 23, 2023, Kobayashi faced reigning Shootboxing champion MISAKI at RISE 166: RISE 20th Memorial event. She won the fight by a unanimous decision after scoring a knockdown in the third round.

Kobayashi challenged erika♡ for her RISE Women's Mini Flyweight title at RISE 173 on November 18, 2023. She won the fight by a second-round technical knockout.

Kobayashi faced Wang Chin Long at RISE 175 on January 14, 2024. She won the fight by a second-round technical knockout.

Kobayashi faced Manazo Kobayashi in an open finger gloves bout at RISE 178 on May 19, 2024. She won the fight by a unanimous decision after scoring a knockdown in the second round.

Kobayashi faced Bo-Kyeong Byun at RISE 182 on October 20, 2024. She won the fight by unanimous decision.

Kobayashi challenged Tessa de Kom for her RISE Women's Flyweight title at RISE 184 on December 15, 2024. She lost the fight by unanimous decision.

Kobayashi was scheduled to defend her RISE Mini Flyweight title against Mei Miyamoto at RISE Fire Ball on May 11, 2025. The fight was ruled a majority decision draw after the first 5 rounds were contested, with Kobayashi losing the unanimous decision after an extra round was fought.

== Championships and accomplishments ==
=== Kickboxing ===
- RISE
  - 2023 RISE Queen Mini Flyweight (-49kg) Champion

=== Muay Thai ===
- Knock Out
  - 2026 KNOCK OUT Red Light Flyweight Champion

=== Karate ===
- Byakuren Kaikan
  - 2019 Byakuren Kaikan All Japan Tournament Lightweight 3rd place
- Seidokaikan
  - 2019 Seidokaikan Adidas Cup All Japan Championship Lightweight Winner
- IKO Kyokushin Kaikan
  - 2018 IKO All Japan Championship Mas Oyama Cup Winner
  - 2019 IKO Nakamura All Japan Championship Lightweight Runner-up
  - 2019 IKO Nakamura Japan Karate Classic Lightweight Winner

=== Awards ===
- Combat Press
  - 2023 Kickboxing Awards Female Fighter of The Year

== Kickboxing record ==
Professional Kickboxing Record
16 Wins (7 KO's), 5 Losses, 1 Draw
Date	Result	Opponent	Event	Location	Method	Round	Time
2026-12-30		(Thailand) Phayahong Banchamek	KNOCK OUT.71 ～K.O CLIMAX 2026～	Tokyo, Japan			
Defending the KNOCK OUT Red Light Flyweight (-49 kg) title.
2026-11-03	Win	(Thailand) Mafia Petchmongkoldee	KNOCK OUT Rebels Series 15	Fukushima, Japan	KO (straight to the body)	1	0:59
2026-08-08	Win	(Thailand) Sanengarm Sakchamni	KNOCK OUT.67	Osaka, Japan	KO (Body punches)	1	1:27
Wins the inaugural KNOCK OUT Red Light Flyweight (-49 kg) title.
2026-05-15	Win	(Thailand) Phuduan CommandoGym	KNOCK OUT 64	Tokyo, Japan	TKO (Body punches)	1	0:23
2025-05-11	Loss	(Japan) Mei Miyamoto	RISE Fire Ball	Nagoya, Japan	Ext.R Decision (Unanimous)	6	3:00
Loses the RISE Queen Mini Flyweight (-49 kg) title.
2024-12-15	Loss	(Netherlands) Tessa de Kom	RISE 184	Tokyo, Japan	Decision (Unanimous)	5	3:00
For the RISE Women's Flyweight (-52 kg) title.
2024-10-20	Win	(South Korea) Bo-Kyeong Byun	RISE 182	Tokyo, Japan	Decision (Unanimous)	3	3:00
2024-05-19	Win	(Japan) Manazo Kobayashi	RISE 178	Tokyo, Japan	Decision (Unanimous)	3	3:00
2024-01-14	Win	(Taiwan) Wang Chin Long	RISE 175	Tokyo, Japan	TKO (Body punches)	2	1:32
2023-11-18	Win	(Japan) erika❤️	RISE 173	Tokyo, Japan	TKO (Punches)	2	0:11
Wins the RISE Queen Mini Flyweight (-49 kg) title.
2023-08-18	Win	(Japan) Mai Hanada	RISE 171	Tokyo, Japan	Decision (Unanimous)	3	3:00
2023-02-23	Win	(Japan) MISAKI	RISE 166: RISE 20th Memorial event	Tokyo, Japan	Decision (Unanimous)	3	3:00
2022-12-10	Win	(Japan) Koto Hiraoka	RISE 163	Tokyo, Japan	Decision (Unanimous)	3	3:00
2022-11-02	Win	(Japan) Wakana Miyazaki	RISE EVOL 11	Tokyo, Japan	Decision (Unanimous)	3	3:00
2022-05-29	Loss	(Japan) Koyuki Miyazaki	RISE 158	Tokyo, Japan	Decision (Unanimous)	5	3:00
For the RISE Queen Atomweight (-46 kg) title.
2022-01-23	Win	(Japan) Shoko	RISE 154	Tokyo, Japan	TKO (Three knockdowns)	2	2:57
2021-07-18	Win	(Japan) Momoka	RISE World Series 2021 Osaka	Osaka, Japan	Decision (Unanimous)	3	3:00
2021-04-17	Win	(Japan) Koto Hiraoka	RISE 148	Tokyo, Japan	Decision (Majority)	3	3:00
2021-01-17	Loss	(Japan) Koyuki Miyazaki	RISE Girls Power 4, Next Challenger Tournament Final	Tokyo, Japan	Decision (Unanimous)	3	3:00
2021-01-17	Win	(Japan) Nana Okuwaki	RISE Girls Power 4, Next Challenger Tournament Semifinal	Tokyo, Japan	TKO (Three knockdowns)	3	2:20
2020-10-11	Loss	(Japan) Koyuki Miyazaki	RISE DEAD OR ALIVE2020 Yokohama	Tokyo, Japan	Decision (Unanimous)	3	3:00
2020-08-23	Win	(Japan) Reina Sato	RISE 141	Tokyo, Japan	Decision (Unanimous)	3	3:00
2020-02-11	Draw	(Japan) Kira Matsutani	RISE Girls Power 2	Tokyo, Japan	Decision (Split)	3	3:00
Legend: Win Loss Draw/No contest Notes

== See also ==
- List of female kickboxers
