= Mei Miyamoto =

Japanese kickboxer (born 1998)

- Born: May 23, 1998 (age 28); Matsusaka, Japan
- Nickname: Fire Bee
- Height: 1.54 m (5 ft 1/2 in)
- Weight: 49 kg (108 lb; 7 st 10 lb)
- Style: Boxing, Kickboxing
- Stance: Orthodox
- Fighting out of: Tokyo, Japan
- Team: KRAZY BEE (2023–present)
- Years active: 2023–present

Kickboxing record
- Total: 9
- Wins: 8
- By knockout: 1
- Losses: 1

Other information
- University: Nippon Sport Science University

Mei Miyamoto (Japanese: 宮本芽依, Miyamoto Mei; born May 23, 1998) is a Japanese professional kickboxer. She is the current RISE Women's Mini Flyweight champion.

As of May 2024, she is ranked as the fourth best women's strawweight kickboxer in the world by Beyond Kickboxing.

== Professional kickboxing career ==
Miyamoto practiced karate during elementary and junior high school and took up boxing after she entered Hisai High School in Tsu, Japan. She competed as an amateur boxer during this time, as well as while attending the Nippon Sport Science University, from which she graduated in spring of 2019. As an amateur boxer, Miyamoto most notably won the 2019 Japanese Women's National Championships in the bantamweight event and became the first women from the Mie Prefecture to win the national amateur title.

Miyamoto made her professional debut against RINA in the opening preliminary bout of RISE 168 on May 28, 2023. She won the fight by unanimous decision, with three scorecards of 30–27 in her favor. Miyamoto was able to knock her opponent down with a left hook in the final round of the bout.

Miyamoto next faced the debuting Nanami Kazushima at RISE 172 on October 29, 2023. She won the fight by unanimous decision, with two scorecards of 29–27 and one scorecard of 30–27 in her favor.

Miyamoto faced the third-ranked RISE mini-flyweight contender Wakana Miyazaki at RISE 177 on April 21, 2024. She won the fight by unanimous decision, with scores of 30–29, 30–29 and 30–28.

Miyamoto faced Melty Kira at RISE 181 on August 31, 2024. She won the fight by unanimous decision, with three scorecards of 30–27 in her favor.

Miyamoto faced Minju Cha at RISE 185 on January 25, 2025. She won the fight by unanimous decision, with all three judges awarding every single round to her.

Miyamoto challenged Arina Kobayashi for her RISE Mini Flyweight title at RISE Fire Ball on May 11, 2025. The fight was ruled a majority decision draw after the first 5 rounds were contested, with Miyamoto winning the unanimous decision after an extra round was fought.

Miyamoto faced Ko Yuna in a non-title bout at RISE 192 on October 19, 2025.

== Championships and accomplishments ==
=== Amateur Boxing ===
- Japanese Boxing Commission
  - (silver) 2015 Youth National Championships Women's Flyweight
  - (silver) 2016 High School National Championships Women's Flyweight
  - (gold) 2019 Senior National Championships Women's Bantamweight

=== Kickboxing ===
- RISE
  - 2025 RISE Queen Mini Flyweight (-49kg) Champion

Awards

  - 2025 Combat Press Female Fighter of the Year

== Fight record ==
Professional Kickboxing Record
8 Wins (1 (T)KOs), 1 Loss, 0 Draws
Date	Result	Opponent	Event	Location	Method	Round	Time
2026-08-29	Win	(Thailand) Namwan Sor.Kongkrapan	RISE 201	Tokyo, Japan	KO (Body punches)	1	2:27
2026-04-26	Loss	(Thailand) Phayahong Banchamek	RISE 197	Tokyo, Japan	Decision (Unanimous)	3	3:00
2025-10-19	Win	(South Korea) Ko Yuna	RISE 192	Tokyo, Japan	Decision (Unanimous)	3	3:00
2025-05-11	Win	(Japan) Arina Kobayashi	RISE Fire Ball	Nagoya, Japan	Ext.R Decision (Unanimous)	6	3:00
Wins the RISE Queen Mini Flyweight (-49kg) title.
2025-01-25	Win	(South Korea) Minju Cha	RISE 185	Tokyo, Japan	Decision (Unanimous)	3	3:00
2024-08-31	Win	(Japan) Melty Kira	RISE 181	Tokyo, Japan	Decision (Unanimous)	3	3:00
2024-04-21	Win	(Japan) Wakana Miyazaki	RISE 177	Tokyo, Japan	Decision (Unanimous)	3	3:00
2023-10-29	Win	(Japan) Nanami Kazushima	RISE 172	Tokyo, Japan	Decision (Unanimous)	3	3:00
2023-05-28	Win	(Japan) RINA	RISE 168	Tokyo, Japan	Decision (Unanimous)	3	3:00
Legend: Win Loss Draw/No contest Notes

Amateur Kickboxing Record
Date	Result	Opponent	Event	Location	Method	Round	Time
2023-01-22	Win	(Japan) Fuyuka Kogiri	RISE NOVA	Tokyo, Japan	KO	1	
Legend: Win Loss Draw/No contest Notes

== See also ==
- List of female kickboxers
