= Honoka Kobayashi =

Japanese kickboxer

- Born: 9 July 2001 (age 25); Itabashi, Japan
- Height: 1.45 m (4 ft 9 in)
- Weight: 46 kg (101 lb; 7 st 3 lb)
- Style: Kickboxing, Karate
- Stance: Southpaw
- Team: Next Level Shibuya
- Years active: 2022 - present

Kickboxing record
- Total: 9
- Wins: 6
- By knockout: 1
- Losses: 2
- Draws: 1

Honoka Kobayashi (Japanese: 小林穂夏, Kobayashi Honoka; born July 9, 2001) is a Japanese kickboxer, currently competing in the atomweight division of RISE. As of March 2024, she is ranked as the eighth-best women's atomweight kickboxer in the world by Beyond Kickboxing.

== Professional career ==
=== RISE ===
Kobayashi made her professional kickboxing debut against Honoka Tsujii at RISE 162 on October 30, 2022. She won the fight with a majority decision.

Kobayashi faced Momone Sakajiri at the RISE 166: RISE 20th Memorial event on February 23, 2023. She won the fight by unanimous decision.

Kobayashi faced Ayaka Nishihara at RISE 168 on May 28, 2023. She won the fight by unanimous decision.

Kobayashi faced Miyu Sakata at RISE World Series 2023 - 2nd Round on August 26, 2023. The fight was ruled a split decision draw.

Kobayashi faced Koto Hiraoka at RISE Fight Club on November 19, 2023. She lost the fight by unanimous decision, with scores of 27–30, 27–30 and 26–30. Kobayashi scored a knock down with a knee strike in the third round.

Kobayashi faced Momoka Mandokoro at RISE 176 on February 23, 2024. She won the fight by unanimous decision, scoring a knock down in the third round.

Kobayashi faced Fuu at RISE 180 on July 26, 2024. She lost the unanimous decision after an extra round was fought.

== Championships and accomplishments ==
- 2022 Japan Cup Women's -50 kg tournament Runner-up

== Fight record ==
Kickboxing record
6 Wins (1 (T)KO), 2 Losses, 1 Draw
Date	Result	Opponent	Event	Location	Method	Round	Time
2026-11-08	Win	(Japan) Ran Iwamoto	RISE 203	Tokyo, Japan	Decision (Unanimous)	3	3:00
2026-08-29	Win	(Japan) Mitsudaman	RISE 201	Tokyo, Japan	TKO (Referee stoppage)	3	1:58
2024-07-26	Loss	(Japan) Fuu	RISE 180	Tokyo, Japan	Ext.R Decision (Unanimous)	4	3:00
2024-02-23	Win	(Japan) Momoka Mandokoro	RISE 176	Tokyo, Japan	Decision (Unanimous)	3	3:00
2023-11-19	Loss	(Japan) Koto Hiraoka	RISE Fight Club	Tokyo, Japan	Decision (Unanimous)	3	3:00
2023-08-26	Draw	(Japan) Miyu Sakata	RISE World Series 2023 - 2nd Round	Tokyo, Japan	Decision (Split)	3	3:00
2023-05-28	Win	(Japan) Ayaka Nishihara	RISE 168	Tokyo, Japan	Decision (Unanimous)	3	3:00
2023-02-23	Win	(Japan) Momone Sakajiri	RISE 166: RISE 20th Memorial event	Tokyo, Japan	Decision (Unanimous)	3	3:00
2022-10-30	Win	(Japan) Honoka Tsujii	RISE 162	Tokyo, Japan	Decision (Majority)	3	3:00

== See also ==
- List of female kickboxers
