= Chaloemporn Sawatsuk =

Thai boxer

Chaloemporn Singwancha
- Born: Chaloemporn Sawatsuk; 30 August 1981 (age 45); Kamphaeng Phet province, Thailand
- Native name: เฉลิมพร สวัสดิ์สุข
- Other names: Kontualai JMBoxingGym (คนตัวลาย เจ.เอ็ม.บ็อกซิ่งยิม)
- Nationality: Thai
- Height: 1.68 m (5 ft 6 in)
- Weight: 85 kg (187 lb; 13 st 5 lb)
- Division: Welterweight; Middleweight; Super middleweight Light heavyweight Cruiserweight
- Reach: 66 in (168 cm)
- Stance: Orthodox
- Fighting out of: Bangkok, Thailand
- Team: JM Boxing Gym

Professional boxing record
- Total: 30
- Wins: 21
- By knockout: 14
- Losses: 9
- By knockout: 7

Kickboxing record
- Total: 95
- Wins: 78
- Losses: 12
- Draws: 5

Other information
- Boxing record from BoxRec

Chaloemporn Sawatsuk (Thai: เฉลิมพร สวัสดิ์สุข; born 30 August 1981) is a Thai professional boxer and Muay Thai kickboxer who has held the Asian Boxing Federation (ABF) welterweight and World Boxing Council (WBC) Asia Silver light heavyweight titles. He has fought across five different weight classes in boxing: welterweight, middleweight, super middleweight, light heavyweight, and cruiserweight. In kickboxing, he also competed for the Japanese promotion RISE. He is also known by the ring names Chaloemporn Singwancha and Kontualai JM Boxinggym.

== Background ==
Before becoming a professional fighter, Sawatsuk worked as an enforcer and debt collector, in addition to selling narcotics. At 19 years old, he was sentenced to life in prison on drug trafficking charges. In 2009, Sawatsuk began boxing in prison at the behest of a prison guard. Eventually, his prison sentence was commuted to 10 years when he experienced success competing as a boxer in prison. Sawatsuk went on to win national prison boxing championships. Upon his release from prison on parole, Sawatsuk began his professional boxing career in 2013. He competed in Muay Thai rules under the ring name Kontualai JMBoxingGym (คนตัวลาย เจ.เอ็ม.บ็อกซิ่งยิม).

== Bare-knuckle boxing ==
=== Bare Knuckle Fighting Championship ===
With his boxing background, Sawatsuk was invited to fight on BKFC Thailand 3: Moment of Truth on 3 September 2022. He faced Dominic Ahnee, whom he beat by third-round technical knockout via doctor stoppage.

He is scheduled to face Keivan Soleimani at BKFC Thailand 5: Legends of Siam on 4 November 2023. Following Keivan Soleimani's withdrawal from the bout, Sawatsuk was slated to face Jonny Tello. Sawatsuk maintained a lead on the scorecards through the first four rounds and even secured a knockdown in the fourth. However, Sawatsuk lost by knockout in the final round.

== Championships and accomplishments ==
=== Boxing ===
- World Boxing Council
  - WBC Asia Silver Light Heavyweight Champion
- Asian Boxing Federation
  - ABF Welterweight Champion
    - Eight title defenses

=== Muay Thai ===
- MX Muay Xtreme
  - MX Muay Xtreme −94 kg Champion
- International MuayThai Sport Association
  - 2022 IMSA World Heavyweight Champion

== Professional boxing record ==
30 fights	21 wins	9 losses
By knockout	14	7
By decision	7	2

No.	Result	Record	Opponent	Type	Round, time	Date	Location	Notes
30	Loss	21–9	Rolly Lambert Fogoum	UD	10	26 Oct 2022	Spaceplus Bangkok RCA, Bangkok, Thailand	For vacant WBC Asia cruiserweight title
29	Loss	21–8	David Gladun	TKO	3 (10), 1:02	19 Dec 2021	USC Soviet Wings, Moscow, Russia	For vacant WBO Oriental light heavyweight title
28	Loss	21–7	Teerachai Sithmorseng	UD	10	19 Dec 2020	Suanlum Night Bazaar, Ratchadapisek, Bangkok, Thailand	
27	Win	21–6	John Korake	UD	10	1 Dec 2019	Sir John Guise Stadium, Port Moresby, Papua New Guinea	Won WBC Asia Silver light heavyweight title
26	Win	20–6	Rafi Majid	UD	6	20 Apr 2019	Workpoint Studio, Bang Phun, Pathum Thani, Thailand	
25	Win	19–6	Rafi Majid	UD	6	26 Jan 2019	Ram 100 Thai Boxing Stadium, Ramkamhaeng, Bangkok, Thailand	
24	Loss	18–6	Ahatelike Muerzhabieke	TKO	6 (8)	24 Aug 2018	Shenzhen Bao'an District Sports Center, Shenzhen, China	For the vacant WBO Chinese super middleweight title
23	Win	18–5	Talifeng Haoken	TKO	3 (6), 2:08	10 Dec 2017	Asia Game Stadium, Guangzhou, China	
22	Loss	17–5	Pui Yu Lim	KO	2 (6)	26 May 2017	Ayutthaya Park, Ayutthaya, Thailand	
21	Loss	17–4	Ainiwaer Yilixiati	KO	2 (6), 0:58	25 Feb 2017	Dali Stadium, Dali, China	
20	Loss	17–3	Andrey Kalyuzhnyy	TKO	3 (10), 1:48	17 Dec 2016	Zhejiang University Stadium, Hangzhou, China	
19	Loss	17–2	Jay Solmiano	KO	1 (8), 2:18	8 Oct 2016	Convention Towers and Exhibition Center, Hong Kong	
18	Loss	17–1	Azizbek Abdugofurov	KO	1 (12), 1:44	23 Jul 2016	Far East Square, Singapore	For vacant WBC Asia middleweight title
17	Win	17–0	Supachai Sungpasert	TKO	4 (6)	9 Feb 2016	Bangkok University, Thonburi Campus, Bangkok, Thailand	
16	Win	16–0	Sayid Jafarien Jasi	TKO	5 (12)	12 Nov 2015	Rajamongkol Technology University, Klong 6, Pathum Thani, Thailand	Retained ABF welterweight title
15	Win	15–0	Felipe Nascimento	UD	6	15 Sep 2015	Floating Market, Sai Noi, Thailand	
14	Win	14–0	Mohamed Larabi	UD	12	22 July 2015	Wat Amphawanjetiyaram School, Samut Songkhram, Thailand	Retained ABF welterweight title
13	Win	13–0	Simone Cecchini	KO	9 (12)	29 May 2015	Royal College Sirindhorn, Nakhon Pathom, Thailand	Retained ABF welterweight title
12	Win	12–0	Wellem Reyk	TKO	5 (12), 0:25	28 May 2015	Samut Songkhram, Thailand	Retained ABF welterweight title
11	Win	11–0	Nelson Gulpe	KO	4 (12)	28 Dec 2014	Wongwianyai, Bangkok, Thailand	Retained ABF welterweight title
10	Win	10–0	Didi Panzer	KO	6 (12), 0:09	18 Sep 2014	Payao Association, Bangkok, Thailand	Retained ABF welterweight title
9	Win	9–0	Valentin Thibaut	KO	3 (6)	29 Jul 2014	Prachthiphat School, Thanyaburi, Pathum Thani, Thailand	
8	Win	8–0	Amor Tino	UD	12	17 Jun 2014	Mahachai Stadium, Samut Sakhon, Thailand	Retained ABF welterweight title
7	Win	7–0	Dan Nazareno Jr.	UD	12	9 Apr 2014	Wongwianyai, Bangkok, Thailand	Retained ABF welterweight title
6	Win	6–0	Ronnel Esparas	KO	4 (12)	28 Dec 2013	Workpoint Studio, Bang Phun, Thailand	Won vacant ABF welterweight title
5	Win	5–0	Cao Yang	KO	1 (6)	19 Nov 2013	13 Coins Resort, Rama 9, Thailand	
4	Win	4–0	Mohamadreza Hamze	TKO	7 (8)	15 Oct 2013	13 Coins Resort, Rama 9, Thailand	
3	Win	3–0	Somsak Raksapon	TKO	3 (6), 1:14	17 Sep 2013	13 Coins Resort, Rama 9, Thailand	
2	Win	2–0	Yannis Belacel	TKO	1 (6)	13 Aug 2013	13 Coins Resort, Rama 9, Thailand	
1	Win	1–0	Suwicha Ratidet	TKO	1 (6)	9 July 2013	13 Coins Resort, Rama 9, Thailand	

== Muay Thai and Kickboxing record ==
Muay Thai and Kickboxing Record (Incomplete)
79 Wins, 13 Losses, 5 Draws
Date	Result	Opponent	Event	Location	Method	Round	Time
2024-10-05	Loss	(Japan) Daichi Abe	RISE Fight Club 2	Tokyo, Japan	Decision (Unanimous)	3	3:00
2024-04-20	Win	(Wales) Joseph Thomas	Rajadamnern World Series	Bangkok, Thailand	TKO (Doctor stoppage)	2	
2024-01-06	Win	(Iran) Farhad Cyrus Gym	Rajadamnern World Series	Bangkok, Thailand	Decision (unanimous)	3	3:00
2023-08-18	Loss	(Japan) Kenta Nanbara	RISE 171	Tokyo, Japan	KO (Right hook)	2	1:32
For the RISE Light Heavyweight Championship.
2023-06-23	Win	(Brazil) Fernando Almeida	RISE 169	Tokyo, Japan	Decision (Unanimous)	3	3:00
2023-04-22	Win	(Japan) Kosuke Jitsukata	Wanchai MuayThai Super Fight vol.8	Nagoya, Japan	KO (Low kick)	2	
Wins the inaugural IMSA Heavyweight Championship.
2022-07-29	Loss	(United States) Paul Powerhouse Phuket	Fighter X	Hua Hin, Thailand	KO (High kick)	1	
2022-05-22	Win	(Australia) Justin Burapha Muaythaigym	MX Muay Xtreme	Phuket, Thailand	Decision	3	3:00
2022-04-30	Win	(United States) Charles Tiger Muaythai	MX Muay Xtreme	Phuket, Thailand	Decision	3	3:00
Wins MX Muay Xtreme −94kg title.
2022-03-26	Loss	(Iran) Arash Mardani	Fighter X	Hua Hin, Thailand	TKO (Elbow injury)	4	
2019-12-22	Draw	(Brazil) Bruno Miranda	MX Muay Xtreme	Bangkok, Thailand	Decision	3	3:00
2019-10-20	Win	(France) Pascal Jaskiewiez	MX Muay Xtreme	Bangkok, Thailand	Decision	3	3:00
2019-08-18	Win	(Iran) Hosein Nasiri	MX Muay Xtreme	Bangkok, Thailand	KO	2	1:50
2019-06-30	Draw	(Australia) Eddie Farrell	MX Muay Xtreme	Bangkok, Thailand	Decision	3	3:00
Legend: Win Loss Draw/No contest Notes

== Bare-knuckle boxing record ==
Professional record breakdown
2 matches	1 win	1 loss
By knockout	1	1

Res.	Record	Opponent	Method	Event	Date	Round	Time	Location	Notes
Loss	1–1	Jonny Tello	KO (punches)	BKFC Thailand 5	November 4, 2023	5	0:50	Pattaya, Thailand	
Win	1–0	Dominic Ahnee	TKO (doctor stoppage)	BKFC Thailand 3	September 3, 2022	3	0:41	Bangkok, Thailand	
