= Wakana Miyazaki =

Japanese kickboxer

- Born: 宮﨑若菜; 24 June 2000 (age 26); Machida, Tokyo, Japan
- Nickname: Evergreen Storm
- Nationality: Japanese
- Height: 1.53 m (5 ft 0 in)
- Weight: 49 kg (108 lb; 7 st 10 lb)
- Style: Kickboxing, Karate
- Stance: Southpaw
- Fighting out of: Machida, Tokyo, Japan
- Team: Yuushinjyuku Karate (2012-2018); TRY HARD (2018-present)

Kickboxing record
- Total: 13
- Wins: 7
- By knockout: 1
- Losses: 5
- By knockout: 0
- Draws: 1

Other information
- Notable relatives: Koyuki Miyazaki (younger sister)

Wakana Miyazaki (Japanese: 宮﨑若菜, Miyazaki Wakana; born June 24, 2000) is a retired Japanese professional kickboxer, competing in the mini-flyweight division of RISE.

As of November 2023, she was ranked as the fifth-best women's strawweight kickboxer in the world.

== Kickboxing career ==
Miyazaki made her professional kickboxing debut against Tomoko Hida at RISE WEST ZERO on October 6, 2019. She won the fight by unanimous decision. Miyazaki next faced AKARI at the inaugural RISE GIRLS POWER event on November 8, 2019, who handed her first loss in the pro ranks, as she won the fight by unanimous decision.

Miyazaki faced Sayaka Takeuchi at RISE Girls Power 2 on February 11, 2020. She won the fight by unanimous decision.

Miyazaki faced Airi Otsuka at KNOCK OUT CHAMPIONSHIP 2 on September 12, 2020. She won the fight by unanimous decision, with scores of 30–28, 30–28 and 30–27.

Miyazaki faced Yu Sakamoto at RISE Girls Power 4 on January 17, 2021. She won the fight by a first-round knockout, the first stoppage victory of her professional career. Miyazaki called for a rematch with AKARI during her post-fight interview, which was booked by the promotion as the semifinal bout of the 2021 RISE NEXT QUEEN tournament and took place at RISE 147 on March 28, 2021. AKARI once again won the fight by unanimous decision.

Miyazaki faced Moe Okura at RISE EVOL 9 on August 28, 2021. She won the fight by unanimous decision, with all three judges awarding her a 29–27 scorecard.

Miyazaki faced the #1 ranked RISE Mini-flyweight contender erika♡ at RISE Girls Power 6 on February 12, 2022. She won the fight by majority decision, with scores of 29–28, 29–27 and 28–28.

Miyazaki faced AKARI in a trilogy bout in the semifinals of the 2022 RISE Mini Flyweight Championship tournament at RISE 157 on April 24, 2022. She suffered her third loss to AKARI by way of split decision, with scores of 29–28, 29–28 and 29–30.

Miyazaki, at the time #1 ranked mini flyweight contender, faced the #2 ranked Arina Kobayashi at RISE EVOL 11 on November 2, 2022. She lost the fight by unanimous decision, with three scorecards of 29–28.

Miyazaki faced Melty Kira at RISE 173 on November 18, 2023, following a year-long absence from professional competition. She won the fight by unanimous decision.

Miyazaki faced Mei Miyamoto at RISE 177 on April 21, 2024. She lost the fight by unanimous decision.

Miyazaki faced Yun Toshima at RISE WORLD SERIES 2024 YOKOHAMA on September 8, 2024. The fight was ruled a draw by split decision after three rounds.

Miyazaki announced her retirement from fighting in July 2026.

== Championships and accomplishments ==
=== Kickboxing ===
- RISE
  - 2019 KAMINARIMON All Japan Women's Flyweight (-52 kg) Tournament Winner

=== Karate ===
- Kenseikai
  - 2013 Kanto Prefecture Karatedo Championships Junior High Runner-up
- Japan Karate Judge Organization
  - 2013 JKJO Karatedo Championships Junior High Champion
- Seiku Juku
  - 2017 East Japan Jr. Full Contact Karatedo Championships Light Middleweight Champion
- IKO Kyokushinkaikan
  - 2017 Kanagawa Prefecture Karatedo Championships Advanced Category Runner-up
- So-Kyokushinkaikan
  - 2017 All Japan Junior Championship High School Lightweight Champion

== Fight record ==
Professional Kickboxing Record
7 Wins (1 (T)KOs), 5 Losses, 1 Draw
Date	Result	Opponent	Event	Location	Method	Round	Time
2024-09-08	Draw	(Japan) Yun Toshima	RISE WORLD SERIES 2024 YOKOHAMA	Yokohama, Japan	Decision (Split)	3	3:00
2024-04-21	Loss	(Japan) Mei Miyamoto	RISE 177	Tokyo, Japan	Decision (Unanimous)	3	3:00
2023-11-18	Win	(Japan) Melty Kira	RISE 173	Tokyo, Japan	Decision (Unanimous)	3	3:00
2022-11-02	Loss	(Japan) Arina Kobayashi	RISE EVOL 11	Tokyo, Japan	Decision (Unanimous)	3	3:00
2022-04-24	Loss	(Japan) AKARI	RISE 157 - Tournament Semifinal	Tokyo, Japan	Decision (Split)	3	3:00
2022-02-12	Win	(Japan) erika♡	RISE Girls Power 6	Tokyo, Japan	Decision (Majority)	3	3:00
2021-08-28	Win	(Japan) Moe Okura	RISE EVOL 9	Tokyo, Japan	Decision (Unanimous)	3	3:00
2021-03-28	Loss	(Japan) AKARI	RISE 147, Tournament Semifinal	Tokyo, Japan	Decision (Unanimous)	3	3:00
2021-01-17	Win	(Japan) Yu Sakamoto	RISE Girls Power 4	Tokyo, Japan	KO (Left hook)	1	2:48
2020-09-12	Win	(Japan) Airi Otsuka	KNOCK OUT CHAMPIONSHIP 2	Tokyo, Japan	Decision (Unanimous)	3	3:00
2020-02-11	Win	(Japan) Sayaka Takeuchi	RISE Girls Power 2	Tokyo, Japan	Decision (Unanimous)	3	3:00
2019-11-08	Loss	(Japan) AKARI	RISE Girls Power	Tokyo, Japan	Decision (Unanimous)	3	3:00
2019-10-06	Win	(Japan) Tomoko Hida	RISE WEST ZERO	Fukuoka, Japan	Decision (Unanimous)	3	3:00
Legend: Win Loss Draw/No contest Notes

Amateur Kickboxing Record
Date	Result	Opponent	Event	Location	Method	Round	Time
2019-08-04	Win	(Japan) Satsuki Murakami	KAMINARIMON All Japan Women's Tournament, Semifinal	Tokyo, Japan	Decision (Unanimous)	1	2:00
Wins the 2019 KAMINARIMON All Japan Women's Flyweight (-52 kg) Tournament title.
2019-08-04	Win	(Japan) Eriko Miyauchi	KAMINARIMON All Japan Women's Tournament, Semifinal	Tokyo, Japan	Decision (Unanimous)	1	2:00
2019-08-04	Win	(Japan) Sayaka Tashiro	KAMINARIMON All Japan Women's Tournament, Quarterfinal	Tokyo, Japan	Decision (Unanimous)	1	2:00
2019-06-02	Win	(Japan) Akane Hayashi	KAMINARIMON	Tokyo, Japan	Decision (Unanimous)	1	2:00
2018-10-21	Win	(Japan) Hidemi Hoshino	KAMINARIMON	Tokyo, Japan	Decision (Split)	1	2:00
Legend: Win Loss Draw/No contest Notes

== See also ==
- List of female kickboxers
