= Uechi =

Uechi (written: 上地) is a Japanese surname. Notable people with the surname include:

- Uechi Kanbun (上地 完文; 1877–1948), Founder of Uechi-Ryū.
- Uechi Kanei (上地 完英; 1911–1991), Son of Uechi Kanbun, forefront of standardizing Uechi-Ryū in the 1950s and 60's.
- Uechi Kanmei (上地 完明; 1941-2015), Eldest son of Uechi Kanei, took over responsibility of the Futenma Dojo and its association after Uechi Kanei retired.
- Katsuya Uechi (1959–2026), Japanese chef and restaurateur who co-founded the upscale sushi brand Katsuya.
