= Takamasa Abiko =

Japanese footballer

Personal information
- Date of birth: 1 February 1978 (age 48)
- Place of birth: Sagamihara, Kanagawa, Japan
- Height: 1.75 m (5 ft 9 in)
- Position: Forward

Youth career
- 1994–1996: Shinjo High School

Senior career*
Years	Team	Apps	(Gls)
1996	Grêmio Maringá		
2001	Edu Soccer Center		
- Bressa Sagamihara
- South FC
2017	Aries FC		
2018	Mito HollyHock	0	(0)
2019–2020	YSCC Yokohama	13	(0)
- * Club domestic league appearances and goals as of 17:04, 22 June 2021 (UTC)

Takamasa Abiko (安彦 考真, Abiko Takamasa; born 1 February 1978) is a former Japanese footballer.

== Career ==
Abiko is the J-League's oldest debutant at age 39.

== Club statistics ==
Club	Season	League			Cup		Total	
Club	Season	Division	Apps	Goals	Apps	Goals	Apps	Goals
Mito HollyHock	2018	J2 League	0	0	0	0	0	0
YSCC Yokohama	2019	J3 League	8	0	0	0	8	0
YSCC Yokohama	2020	J3 League	5	0	0	0	5	0
YSCC Yokohama	Total		13	0	0	0	13	0
Career total			13	0	0	0	13	0
