= 2023 in RISE =

Kickboxing events

Information
- First date: January 28
- Last date: December 16, 2023

Events
- Total events: 21

The year 2023 was the 20th year in the history of RISE, a Japanese kickboxing promotion. RISE events were streamed on the Japanese streaming service Abema TV.

== List of events ==
#	Event Title	Date	Arena	Location
1	RISE 164	January 28, 2023	Korakuen Hall	Tokyo, Japan
2	RISE 165: RISE 20th Memorial event	February 22, 2023	Korakuen Hall	Tokyo, Japan
3	RISE 166: RISE 20th Memorial event	February 23, 2023	Korakuen Hall	Tokyo, Japan
4	RISE WEST ZERO	March 12, 2023	Battle Stage Fukuoka	Fukuoka, Japan
5	RISE ELDORADO 2023	March 26, 2023	Ariake Arena	Kōtō, Japan
6	RISE 167	April 21, 2023	Korakuen Hall	Tokyo, Japan
7	RISE 168	May 28, 2023	Korakuen Hall	Tokyo, Japan
8	RISE Fight Party	June 9, 2023	Shinjuku Face	Tokyo, Japan
9	RISE WEST 19	June 18, 2023	Nishitetsu Hall	Fukuoka, Japan
10	RISE 169	June 23, 2023	Korakuen Hall	Tokyo, Japan
11	RISE World Series 2023 - 1st Round	July 2, 2023	Edion Arena Osaka	Osaka, Japan
12	RISE 170	July 30, 2023	Korakuen Hall	Tokyo, Japan
13	RISE 171	August 18, 2023	Korakuen Hall	Tokyo, Japan
14	RISE World Series 2023 - 2nd Round	August 26, 2023	Ota City General Gymnasium	Tokyo, Japan
15	RISE WEST 20	October 1, 2023	Nishitetsu Hall	Fukuoka, Japan
16	RISE 172	October 29, 2023	Korakuen Hall	Tokyo, Japan
17	RISE 173	November 18, 2023	Korakuen Hall	Tokyo, Japan
18	FIGHT CLUB	November 19, 2023	Closed to the public	Tokyo, Japan
19	RISE WEST 21	December 3, 2023	Nishitetsu Hall	Fukuoka, Japan
20	RISE 174	December 10, 2023	Korakuen Hall	Tokyo, Japan
21	RISE World Series 2023 - Final Round	December 16, 2023	Ryogoku Kokugikan	Tokyo, Japan

== RISE 2023 Awards ==
- RISE Fighter of the Year 2023: Toki Tamaru
- RISE Fight of the Year 2023: Kenta Nanbara vs. Kongtualai JMBoxing
- RISE Knockout of the Year 2023: Kazuki Osaki vs. Nicolas Rivas
- RISE Rookie of the Year 2023: Hyu
- RISE Gym of the Year 2023: Try Hard Gym

== RISE 164 ==
RISE 164
- Promotion: RISE
- Date: January 28, 2023
- Venue: Korakuen Hall
- City: Tokyo, Japan

RISE 164 was a kickboxing event that was held by RISE, on January 28, 2023, in Tokyo, Japan.

=== Background ===
A RISE Super Featherweight (-60kg) Championship bout between Chan Hyung Lee and Hyuma Hitachi headlined the event, while a non-title bout between Kazuki Osaki and Mangkon Boomdeksian served as the co-main event.

=== Fight Card ===
RISE 164
Weight Class				Method	Round	Time	Notes
Super featherweight 60 kg	(South Korea) Chan Hyung Lee (c)	def.	(Japan) Hyuma Hitachi	Ext. R. Decision (Unanimous)	6	3:00	For the RISE Super Featherweight (-60kg) Championship
Super flyweight 53 kg	(Japan) Kazuki Osaki	def.	(Thailand) Mangkon Boomdeksian	TKO (Three knockdowns)	2	2:20	
Super flyweight 53 kg	(Japan) Toki Tamaru	def.	(Thailand) Khunsuknoi Boomdeksian	Decision (Majority)	3	3:00	
Middleweight 70 kg	(Japan) Hirokatsu Miyagi	def.	(Japan) Masaya Jaki	Ext. R. Decision (Unanimous)	4	3:00	
Super featherweight 60 kg	(Japan) Shigeki Fujii	def.	(Japan) SEIDO	Decision (Unanimous)	3	3:00	
Featherweight 57.5 kg	(Japan) Masamitsu Kutsuwa	def.	(Japan) Kenichi Takeuchi	Decision (Unanimous)	3	3:00	
Catchweight 87 kg	(Thailand) Artty Fellowgym	def.	(Japan) Shota Takigami	Decision (Split)	3	3:00	
Featherweight 57.5 kg	(Japan) Koki Shiratori	def.	(Japan) Yuto Nomura	KO (Left hook)	2	1:30	
Bantamweight 55 kg	(Japan) Tsubasa Wakahara	def.	(Japan) Ryoma Takeuchi	Decision (Majority)	3	3:00	

== RISE 165: RISE 20th Memorial event ==
RISE 165: RISE 20th Memorial event
- Promotion: RISE
- Date: February 22, 2023
- Venue: Korakuen Hall
- City: Tokyo, Japan

RISE 165: RISE 20th Memorial event was a kickboxing event that was held by RISE, on February 22, 2023, in Tokyo, Japan.

=== Background ===
A bantamweight bout between Koki Osaki and Ryoga Terayama was booked as the main event, while a featherweight bout between Kaito and Taisei Umei served as the co-main event.

=== Fight Card ===
RISE 165: RISE 20th Memorial event
Weight Class				Method	Round	Time	Notes
Bantamweight 55 kg	(Japan) Koki Osaki	draw.	(Japan) Ryoga Terayama	Tech. Decision (Majority)	3	1:54	Terayama was unable to continue competing due to a low blow.
Featherweight 57.5 kg	(Japan) Kaito	def.	(Japan) Taisei Umei	Decision (Majority)	3	3:00	
Super flyweight 53 kg	(Japan) Riku Kazushima	def.	(Thailand) Prandam Bravleygym	KO (Left straight)	2	2:49	
Featherweight 57.5 kg	(Japan) Kengo	def.	(Japan) Kenshin Yamamoto	Decision (Unanimous)	3	3:00	
Middleweight 70 kg	(Japan) Masashi Nakajima	def.	(Japan) Shoma Hattori	Decision (Majority)	3	3:00	
Catchweight 45 kg	(Japan) Momoka Mandokoro	def.	(Japan) Jolyne Matsumoto	Decision (Unanimous)	3	3:00	
Super flyweight 53 kg	(Japan) Kaito Hasegawa	def.	(Japan) Naoya Kuroda	TKO (Three knockdowns)	2	2:53	
Featherweight 57.5 kg	(Japan) Kakeru	def.	(Japan) Kaito Fuji	Decision (Unanimous)	3	3:00	
Featherweight 57.5 kg	(Japan) Kaito Tsuzuki	def.	(Japan) Shintaro Kawazu	TKO (Three knockdowns)	1	0:56	
Lightweight 62.5 kg	(Japan) Hyu	def.	(Japan) Ryuki Yoshioka	Decision (Unanimous)	3	3:00	
Flyweight 51.5 kg	(Japan) Shuma	def.	(Japan) Ryoma Hirayama	TKO (Three knockdowns)	1	2:35	

== RISE 166: RISE 20th Memorial event ==
RISE 166: RISE 20th Memorial event
- Promotion: RISE
- Date: February 23, 2023
- Venue: Korakuen Hall
- City: Tokyo, Japan

RISE 166: RISE 20th Memorial event was a kickboxing event that was held by RISE, on February 23, 2023, in Tokyo, Japan.

=== Background ===
A one-day RISE New Warriors Flyweight tournament was held during the event, which featured the following fighters: Momu Tsukamoto, Ryujin Nasukawa, Tenshi Matsumoto and Kuryu.

=== RISE New Warriors Tournament bracket ===
Semi-finals
(Japan) Tenshi Matsumoto	DEC
(Japan) Kuryu	3
(Japan) Momu Tsukamoto	DEC
(Japan) Ryujin Nasukawa	3

Final
(Japan) Tenshi Matsumoto	KO
(Japan) Momu Tsukamoto	3

=== Fight Card ===
RISE 166: RISE 20th Memorial event
Weight Class				Method	Round	Time	Notes
Flyweight 51.5 kg	(Japan) Tenshi Matsumoto	def.	(Japan) Momu Tsukamoto	KO (Left uppercut)	3	0:43	RISE New Warriors Flyweight Tournament Final.
Catchweight 46.5 kg	(Japan) Arina Kobayashi	def.	(Japan) MISAKI	Decision (Unanimous)	3	3:00	
Lightweight 62.5 kg	(Japan) Shohei Asahara	def.	(Japan) Ruka	KO (Left hook)	1	3:01	
Bantamweight 55 kg	(Japan) Yugo Kato	def.	(Japan) Yuki Kyotani	KO (Right straight)	2	2:59	
Middleweight 70 kg	(Argentina) Ricardo Bravo	def.	(Canada) Sasha Tadayoni	TKO (Three knockdowns)	2	1:35	
Featherweight 57.5 kg	(Japan) Tatsuto Ito	vs.	(Japan) Ryunosuke Matsushita				Bout cancelled as Ito was hospitalized cutting weight.
Welterweight 67.5 kg	(Japan) Ryoya Inai	def.	(Japan) Yosuke Aoki	Decision (Unanimous)	3	3:00	
Flyweight 51.5 kg	(Japan) Tenshi Matsumoto	def.	(Japan) Kuryu	Decision (Unanimous)	3	3:00	RISE New Warriors Flyweight Tournament Semifinal.
Flyweight 51.5 kg	(Japan) Momu Tsukamoto	def.	(Japan) Ryujin Nasukawa	Decision (Unanimous)	3	3:00	RISE New Warriors Flyweight Tournament Semifinal.
Atomweight 46 kg	(Japan) Honoka Kobayashi	def.	(Japan) Momone Sakajiri	Decision (Unanimous)	3	3:00	
Mini flyweight 49 kg	(Japan) Yun Tojima	draw.	(Japan) RINA	Decision (Unanimous)	3	3:00	

== Rise west zero ==
RISE WEST ZERO
- Promotion: RISE
- Date: March 12, 2023
- Venue: Battle Stage Fukuoka
- City: Fukuoka, Japan

RISE WEST ZERO was a kickboxing event that was held by RISE, on March 12, 2023, in Fukuoka, Japan.

=== Background ===
A short four-fight card was organized for the event, headlined by a super flyweight bout between Shunnosuke and Dangan Futa.

=== Fight Card ===
RISE WEST ZERO
Weight Class				Method	Round	Time	Notes
Super flyweight 53 kg	(Japan) Shunnosuke	def.	(Japan) Dangan Futa	Decision (Majority)	3	3:00	
Super featherweight 60 kg	(Japan) Sota	draw.	(Japan) Kenshin	Decision (Majority)	3	3:00	
Catchweight 57 kg	(Japan) Takekiyo Tominaga	def.	(Japan) Hikari Shiozaki	KO (Left hook)	1	1:13	
Middleweight 70 kg	(Japan) KO-TA BRAVELY	def.	(Japan) Yuki Nakahara	TKO (Referee stoppage)	3	1:34	

== Rise eldorado 2023 ==
RISE EL DORADO 2023
- Promotion: RISE
- Date: March 26, 2023
- Venue: Ariake Arena
- City: Tokyo, Japan

RISE ELDORADO 2023 was a kickboxing event that was held by RISE, on March 26, 2023, in Tokyo, Japan.

=== Background ===
Three title bouts were held during the event: an inaugural RISE Bantamweight World Championship bout between Shiro and Diesellek Wor.Wanchai, a vacant ISKA Light Welterweight (-65 kg) K-1 Rules World Championship bout between Kento Haraguchi and Jérémy Monteiro, and a RISE Middleweight Championship bout between Kaito Ono and Lee Sung-hyun.

The super featherweight bout between Kazuma and Taiga was cancelled at the official weigh-ins, due to Taiga's poor physical condition.

=== Fight Card ===
RISE ELDORADO 2023
Weight Class				Method	Round	Time	Notes
Bantamweight 53 kg	(Japan) Shiro	def.	(Thailand) Diesellek Wor.Wanchai	KO (Right head kick)	5	2:37	For the inaugural RISE Bantamweight World Championship.
Super lightweight 65 kg	(Japan) Kento Haraguchi	def.	(France) Jérémy Monteiro	TKO (High kick + punches)	4	1:45	For the vacant ISKA Light Welterweight (-65 kg) K-1 Rules World Championship.
Middleweight 70 kg	(Japan) Kaito Ono	def.	(South Korea) Lee Sung-hyun (c)	Decision (Unanimous)	5	3:00	For the RISE Middleweight Championship.
Catchweight 53.5 kg	(Japan) Kazuki Osaki	def.	(Spain) Javier Cecilio	KO (Right straight)	1	2:49	
Catchweight 54 kg	(Japan) Toki Tamaru	def.	(Japan) Kazane Nagai	Decision (Unanimous)	3	3:00	RISE -54 kg World Series Tournament Qualifier.
Catchweight 47.5 kg	(Japan) Koyuki Miyazaki	def.	(South Korea) Bo Kyung Byun	KO (KO (Left straight))	1	1:50	
Super lightweight 65 kg	(Japan) Taiju Shiratori	def.	(Japan) Daizo Sasaki	Decision (Unanimous)	3	3:00	
Light heavyweight 90 kg	(Japan) Kenta Nanbara	def.	(Japan) Ryo Aitaka	KO (Knee)	1	2:57	
Featherweight 57.5 kg	(Japan) Keisuke Monguchi	def.	(Japan) Takahito Niimi	Decision (Unanimous)	3	3:00	
Super featherweight 60 kg	(Japan) Kazuma	vs.	(Japan) Taiga				Bout cancelled as Taiga was hospitalized cutting weight.
Middleweight 70 kg	(Japan) Motoyasuk	def.	(Japan) Yuya	Ext. R. Decision (Unanimous)	4	3:00	
Catchweight 68 kg	(Japan) KENTA	def.	(Japan) Takamasa Abiko	Decision (Unanimous)	3	3:00	
Super lightweight 65 kg	(Japan) Hiroto Yamaguchi	def.	(Brazil) Thalisson Ferreira	KO (Spinning backfist)	2	2:32	Open-finger glove bout.
Preliminary Card
Bantamweight 55 kg	(Japan) Hyuga Umemoto	def.	(Japan) Kyosuke	Decision (Unanimous)	3	3:00	
Catchweight 56 kg	(Netherlands) Montana Aerts	def.	(Japan) Kitariko	Decision (Majority)	3	3:00	

== RISE 167 ==
RISE 167
- Promotion: RISE
- Date: April 21, 2023
- Venue: Korakuen Hall
- City: Tokyo, Japan

RISE 167 was a kickboxing event that was held by RISE, on April 21, 2023, in Tokyo, Japan.

=== Background ===
A RISE Lightweight Championship bout between champion Naoki and challenger Kan Nakamura was scheduled as the event headliner, while a vacant ISKA Oriental rules World Flyweight (-53.5 kg) Championship bout between Kazuki Osaki and Nicolas Rivas served as the co-main event.

A special RISE Challenge fight, limited to two three-minute rounds, was contested by Kumiko Kaneko and RISE ring girl Kanon Miyahara.

=== Fight Card ===
RISE 167
Weight Class				Method	Round	Time	Notes
Lightweight 62.5 kg	(Japan) Kan Nakamura	def.	(Japan) Naoki (c)	Decision (Majority)	5	3:00	For the RISE Lightweight Championship.
Catchweight 53.5 kg	(Japan) Kazuki Osaki	def.	(France) Nicolas Rivas	KO (Spinning heel kick)	4	0:28	For the vacant ISKA Oriental rules World Flyweight (-53.5 kg) Championship.
Super lightweight 65 kg	(Japan) KENTA	def.	(Japan) Yuma Yamahata	Decision (Unanimous)	3	3:00	
Atomweight 46 kg	(Japan) Koto Hiraoka	def.	(Japan) Minori Kikuchi	Decision (Unanimous)	3	3:00	Open-finger glove bout.
Super featherweight 60 kg	(Japan) Taiki Sawatani	def.	(Japan) Masaaki Ono	Ext. R. Decision (Unanimous)	4	3:00	
Featherweight 57.5 kg	(Japan) Daiki Toida	draw.	(Japan) Yuki Hamada	Ext. R. Decision (Split)	4	3:00	Hamada was deducted a point prior to the bout and fought in the larger 8 oz gloves due to missing weight.
Catchweight 61.5 kg	(Japan) Ryuya Koide	def.	(Japan) Hikaru Fujihashi	Decision (Unanimous)	3	3:00	
Featherweight 57.5 kg	(Japan) Joichi Yana	def.	(Japan) Towa	TKO (Punches)	1	2:26	
Preliminary Card
Flyweight 52 kg	(Japan) Kanon Miyahara	def.	(Japan) Kumiko Kaneko	KO (Right hook)	1	0:39	RISE Challenge bout (two round limit).

== RISE 168 ==
RISE 168
- Promotion: RISE
- Date: May 28, 2023
- Venue: Korakuen Hall
- City: Tokyo, Japan

RISE 168 was a kickboxing event that was held by RISE, on May 28, 2023, in Tokyo, Japan.

=== Background ===
A RISE Women's Flyweight Championship bout between Tessa de Kom and Manazo Kobayashi was booked as the main event, while a bantamweight bout between Koki Osaki and Ryoga Terayama served as the co-headliner.

=== Fight Card ===
RISE 168
Weight Class				Method	Round	Time	Notes
Flyweight 52 kg	(Netherlands) Tessa de Kom	def.	(Japan) Manazo Kobayashi (c)	Decision (Unanimous)	5	3:00	For the RISE Women's Flyweight Championship.
Flyweight 52 kg	(Japan) Koki Osaki	def.	(Japan) Ryoga Terayama	TKO (Three knockdowns)	2	1:56	
Middleweight 70 kg	(Argentina) Ricardo Bravo	vs.	(Japan) Yuya				Bout cancelled as Bravo was hospitalized cutting weight.
Bantamweight 55 kg	(Japan) Yuka Murakami	def.	(Japan) KOKOZ	Decision (Unanimous)	3	3:00	RISE Queen Bantamweight Tournament Semifinal.
Bantamweight 55 kg	(Japan) Seina	def.	(Japan) Yura Kamiya	Decision (Unanimous)	3	3:00	RISE Queen Bantamweight Tournament Semifinal.
Super lightweight 65 kg	(Japan) Yutaro Asahi	def.	(Japan) Masa Sato	KO (Knee)	1	1:11	
Flyweight 52 kg	(Japan) Melty Kira	def.	(Japan) Yaya Weerasakreck	Decision (Majority)	3	3:00	
Welterweight 67.5 kg	(Japan) Taichi Ishikawa	def.	(Japan) Kosuke Takagi	Decision (Unanimous)	3	3:00	
Heavyweight 120 kg	(Japan) Miyagin	def.	(Japan) MAX Yoshida	KO (Right hook)	1	2:14	
Featherweight 57.5 kg	(Japan) Shun Shiraishi	def.	(Japan) Koki Shiratori	KO (Right hook)	1	1:43	
Preliminary Card
Flyweight 51.5 kg	(Japan) Ryunosuke Ito	def.	(Japan) Shuma	Decision (Unanimous)	3	3:00	
Catchweight 45 kg	(Japan) Honoka Kobayashi	def.	(Japan) Ayaka Nishihara	Decision (Unanimous)	3	3:00	
Mini flyweight 49 kg	(Japan) Mei Miyamoto	def.	(Japan) RINA	Decision (Unanimous)	3	3:00	

== RISE Fight Party ==
RISE Fight Party
- Promotion: RISE
- Date: June 9, 2023
- Venue: Korakuen Hall
- City: Tokyo, Japan

RISE Fight Party was a kickboxing event that was held by RISE, on June 9, 2023, in Tokyo, Japan.

=== Background ===
The event featured only three bouts, as it was primarily focused on allowing fans to interact with RISE champions and other notable fighters who didn't fight at the event.

=== Fight Card ===
RISE Fight Party
Weight Class				Method	Round	Time	Notes
Super featherweight 60 kg	(Japan) Naofumi Yamashina	def.	(Japan) Yuki Morishita	TKO (Three knockdowns)	2	2:15	
Super flyweight 53 kg	(Japan) Raize	def.	(Japan) Shunnosuke	Decision (Unanimous)	3	3:00	
Flyweight 52 kg	(Japan) Kitariko	def.	(Japan) Tomomi Yamamoto	Decision (Unanimous)	3	3:00	Yamamoto was deducted 2 points prior to the fight for missing weight.

== RISE WEST 19 ==
RISE WEST 19
- Promotion: RISE
- Date: June 9, 2023
- Venue: Nishitetsu Hall
- City: Fukuoka, Japan

RISE WEST 19 was a kickboxing event that was held by RISE, on June 9, 2023, in Fukuoka, Japan.

=== Background ===
A featherweight bout between Naofumi Yamashina and Kenshin Yamamoto was scheduled as the main event.

A post-fight review overturned Takekiyo Tominaga's majority decision victory over Yoshiki to a split decision draw, as it was found that the referee had wrongly deducted a point from Yoshiki on two separate occasions.

=== Fight Card ===
RISE WEST 19
Weight Class				Method	Round	Time	Notes
Featherweight 57.5 kg	(Japan) Naofumi Yamashina	def.	(Japan) Kenshin Yamamoto	KO (Left hook)	4	0:33	
Middleweight 70 kg	(Japan) Shoma Hattori	def.	(Japan) Ryuichi	Decision (Unanimous)	3	3:00	
Middleweight 70 kg	(Japan) Kiyoteru Suzuki	def.	(Japan) Taiki Iwamasa	Decision (Majority)	3	3:00	
Featherweight 57.5 kg	(Japan) Takekiyo Tominaga	draw.	(Japan) Yoshiki	Decision (Split)	3	3:00	Originally a majority decision win for Tominaga, overturned to a split decision draw following a referee review
Super flyweight 53 kg	(Japan) Dangan Futa	def.	(Japan) Kenshi	TKO (Three knockdowns)	2	2:26	
Super flyweight 53 kg	(Japan) Naoyuki Irie	def.	(Japan) Ryuto	Decision (Unanimous)	3	3:00	
Super lightweight 65 kg	(Japan) Kengo Haruta	def.	(Japan) Hiroki Zaitsu	Decision (Unanimous)	3	3:00	
Super featherweight 60 kg	(Japan) Sho Arao	def.	(Japan) Kazuhisa Nagao	KO (Right hook)	2	1:17	
Catchweight 50 kg	(Japan) Ruka	def.	(Japan) Sayaka Shimizu	Decision (Unanimous)	3	3:00	
Atomweight 46 kg	(Japan) Sea	def.	(Japan) Natsumi Hibata	Decision (Unanimous)	3	3:00	

== RISE 169 ==
RISE 169
- Promotion: RISE
- Date: June 23, 2023
- Venue: Korakuen Hall
- City: Tokyo, Japan

RISE 169 was a kickboxing event that was held by RISE, on June 23, 2023, in Tokyo, Japan.

=== Background ===
The semifinals bouts of the RISE Light heavyweight tournament were held during the event.

=== Fight Card ===
RISE 169
Weight Class				Method	Round	Time	Notes
Light heavyweight 90 kg	(Japan) Kenta Nanbara	def.	(Japan) Kazuki Irita	TKO (Punches)	2	1:38	RISE Light Heavyweight Tournament Semifinal
Light heavyweight 90 kg	(Thailand) Kontualai JMBoxinggym	def.	(Brazil) Fernando Almeida da Silva	Decision (Unanimous)	3	3:00	RISE Light Heavyweight Tournament Semifinal
Bantamweight 55 kg	(Japan) Yugo Kato	def.	(Japan) Yosuke	Decision (Unanimous)	3	3:00	
Flyweight 51.5 kg	(Japan) Ryujin Nasukawa	def.	(Japan) Jo Aizawa	Decision (Unanimous)	3	3:00	
Super featherweight 60 kg	(Japan) Shigeki Fujii	def.	(Japan) Taisei Iwago	Decision (Unanimous)	3	3:00	
Lightweight 63 kg	(Japan) Ryuto Shiokawa	def.	(Japan) Chiharu Higuchi	Decision (Majority)	3	3:00	
Featherweight 57.5 kg	(Japan) Kaito Tsuzuki	def.	(Japan) Ryunosuke Matsushita	TKO (Doctor stoppage)	1	0:26	
Bantamweight 55 kg	(Japan) Ryu Matsunaga	def.	(Japan) Tsubasa Wakahara	Decision (Split)	3	3:00	
Bantamweight 55 kg	(Japan) Tomoya Fukui	def.	(Japan) Ryoma Takeuchi	Decision (Majority)	3	3:00	
Lightweight 63 kg	(Japan) Taku	def.	(Japan) Takahiro Hosono	TKO (Punches)	1	1:24	
Mini flyweight 49 kg	(Japan) Runa Okumura	def.	(Japan) Yun Tojima	Decision (Majority)	3	3:00	

== RISE World Series 2023 - 1st Round ==
RISE WORLD SERIES 2023 1ST ROUND
- Promotion: RISE
- Date: July 2, 2023
- Venue: Edion Arena Osaka
- City: Osaka, Japan

RISE World Series 2023 - 1st Round was a kickboxing event that was held by RISE, on July 2, 2023, in Tokyo, Japan.

=== Background ===
A super lightweight bout between the former RISE Lightweight (-63 kg) champion Kento Haraguchi and the three-time Glory Featherweight title challenger Anvar Boynazarov was scheduled as the main event. The four semifinal bouts of the RISE -54 kg World Series Tournament were held during the event.

=== Fight Card ===
RISE World Series 2023 - 1st Round
Weight Class				Method	Round	Time	Notes
Super lightweight 65 kg	(Japan) Kento Haraguchi	def.	(Uzbekistan) Anvar Boynazarov	KO (Body kick)	1	1:31	
Catchweight 54 kg	(Japan) Shiro	def.	(Spain) Ruben Seoane	Decision (Unanimous)	3	3:00	RISE -54 kg World Series Tournament Quarterfinal
Catchweight 54 kg	(Japan) Kazuki Osaki	def.	(France) Aiman Lahmar	TKO (Three knockdowns)	2	1:41	RISE -54 kg World Series Tournament Quarterfinal
Catchweight 54 kg	(Japan) Toki Tamaru	def.	(Thailand) Petchsila Wor.Auracha	KO (Knee)	1	2:57	RISE -54 kg World Series Tournament Quarterfinal
Catchweight 54 kg	(Thailand) Kumandoi Petcharoenvit	def.	(Belgium) Mohamed Kloua	Decision (Unanimous)	3	3:00	RISE -54 kg World Series Tournament Quarterfinal
Lightweight 63 kg	(South Korea) Chan Hyung Lee	def.	(Japan) Yuma Yamaguchi	KO (Left hook)	1	1:11	Open-finger glove bout.
Catchweight 54 kg	(Japan) Jin Mandokoro	def.	(Japan) Kazane Nagai	Ext. R. Decision (Split)	4	3:00	RISE -54 kg World Series Tournament reserve bout.
Welterweight 67.5 kg	(Japan) Ryota Nakano	def.	(South Korea) Lee Sung-hyun	KO (Spinning backfist)	2	1:03	
Featherweight 57.5 kg	(Japan) Keisuke Monguchi	def.	(Japan) Kyo Kawakami	Decision (Majority)	3	3:00	
Kosei Yamada retirement ceremony
Middleweight 70 kg	(Japan) Yuya	def.	(Japan) Shoma Hattori	Decision (Unanimous)	3	3:00	
Catchweight 62 kg	(Japan) Ryuki Kaneda	def.	(Netherlands) Hamza Hazzar	Decision (Unanimous)	3	3:00	
Super flyweight 53 kg	(Japan) Riku Kazushima	def.	(Japan) Hiroki Matsuoka	Decision (Unanimous)	3	3:00	
Super flyweight 53 kg	(Japan) Momu Tsukamoto	def.	(Japan) Toshihiro Yamakawa	KO (Spinning backfist)	1	2:18	
Bantamweight 55 kg	(Japan) Yuki Kyotani	def.	(Japan) Shoma	Decision (Unanimous)	3	3:00	
Preliminary Card
Super lightweight 65 kg	(Japan) Shota	def.	(Japan) Keyaki Yamamoto	TKO (Corner stoppage)	2	2:01	
Catchweight 53 kg	(Japan) Hotaru	def.	(Japan) Runa Kawano				Hotaru was declared winner by default, as Kawano missed weight by 3.5 kg.

== RISE 170 ==
RISE 170
- Promotion: RISE
- Date: July 30, 2023
- Venue: Korakuen Hall
- City: Tokyo, Japan

RISE 170 was a kickboxing event that was held by RISE, on July 30, 2023, in Tokyo, Japan.

=== Background ===
The finals of the RISE Queen Bantamweight Tournament, held to crown the inaugural RISE Women's Bantamweight champion, was held during the event.

A -75 kg catchweight bout between Daiki Kazama and Blackbear Yukijin was cancelled, as Kazama failed a pre-fight medical check-up.

=== Fight Card ===
RISE 170
Weight Class				Method	Round	Time	Notes
Bantamweight 55 kg	(Japan) Seina	def.	(Japan) Yuka Murakami	Decision (Unanimous)	5	3:00	RISE Queen Bantamweight Tournament Final. For the inaugural RISE Women's Bantamweight Championship.
Flyweight 51.5 kg	(Japan) Tenshi Matsumoto	def.	(Japan) Dangan Futa	KO (Left straight)	1	0:58	
Super flyweight 53 kg	(Japan) Kaito Hasegawa	def.	(Japan) Tsubasa	KO (Left straight)	1	0:58	
Welterweight 67.5 kg	(Japan) Ryoya Inai	def.	(Japan) Takumi Sanekata	Ext. R. Decision (Unanimous)	4	3:00	
Super lightweight 65 kg	(Japan) Tomohiro Kitai	def.	(Japan) Seietsu Kitahama	TKO (Corner stoppage)	3	1:24	
Middleweight 70 kg	(Canada) Sasha Tadayoni	def.	(Japan) Hirokatsu Miyagi	KO (Head kick)	1	2:53	
Welterweight 67.5 kg	(Japan) Taichi Ishikawa	def.	(Japan) Masashi Nakajima	KO (Left hook)	1	2:24	
Bantamweight 55 kg	(Japan) Hyuga	def.	(Japan) Naoya Otada				Hyuga was declared winner by default, as Otada missed weight.
Featherweight 57.5 kg	(Japan) Knight Makino	def.	(Japan) Retsu Sashida	Decision (Unanimous)	3	3:00	
Super featherweight 60 kg	(Japan) Soma Higashi	def.	(Japan) Kizuku Uchimoto	TKO (Three knockdowns)	1	3:00	
Flyweight 51.5 kg	(Japan) Kota Arai	def.	(Japan) Sotaro Kaki	Decision (Unanimous)	3	3:00	Open-finger glove bout.

== RISE 171 ==
RISE 171
- Promotion: RISE
- Date: August 18, 2023
- Venue: Korakuen Hall
- City: Tokyo, Japan

RISE 171 was a kickboxing event that was held by RISE, on August 18, 2023, in Tokyo, Japan.

=== Background ===
The RISE Light Heavyweight Tournament finals, contested between Kenta Nanbara and Kontualai JMBoxinggym, was held during the event.

=== Fight Card ===
RISE 171
Weight Class				Method	Round	Time	Notes
Light heavyweight 90 kg	(Japan) Kenta Nanbara	def.	(Thailand) Kontualai JMBoxinggym	KO (Right hook)	2	1:35	RISE Light Heavyweight Tournament Final. For the vacant RISE Light Heavyweight championship.
Bantamweight 55 kg	(Japan) Masahiko Suzuki	def.	(Spain) Imad Salhi	KO (Right hook)	2	2:57	
Flyweight 52 kg	(Japan) Manazo Kobayashi	def.	(Japan) Melty Kira	Decision (Unanimous)	3	3:00	
Featherweight 57.5 kg	(Japan) Shuto Miyazaki	def.	(Japan) Shun Shiraishi	Ext. R. Decision (Unanimous)	4	3:00	Miyazaki was deducted a point in the third round for illegal clinching.
Super featherweight 60 kg	(Japan) Shota Okudaira	def.	(Japan) Sota	TKO (Punches)	3	1:13	
Catchweight 48 kg	(Japan) Arina Kobayashi	def.	(Japan) Mai Hanada	Decision (Unanimous)	3	3:00	
Atomweight 46 kg	(Japan) Momoka Mandokoro	def.	(Japan) Sami Ogawa	Decision (Majority)	3	3:00	
Super featherweight 60 kg	(Japan) Naofumi Yamashina	def.	(Japan) Tsuru Junpei	Decision (Unanimous)	3	3:00	
Super flyweight 53 kg	(Japan) Yuga Hoshi	def.	(Japan) Ryunosuke Ito	Decision (Unanimous)	3	3:00	
Lightweight 63 kg	(Japan) Hyu	def.	(Japan) Masahito Okuyama	Decision (Unanimous)	3	3:00	
Welterweight 67.5 kg	(Japan) Ryu Nakamura	def.	(Japan) Shogo	KO (Left hook)	1	0:53	

== RISE World Series 2023 - 2nd Round ==
RISE World Series 2023 - 2nd Round
- Promotion: RISE
- Date: August 26, 2023
- Venue: Ota City General Gymnasium
- City: Tokyo, Japan

RISE World Series 2023 - 2nd Round was a kickboxing event that was held by RISE, on August 18, 2023, in Tokyo, Japan.

=== Background ===
The inaugural RISE OFG Super Lightweight (-65kg) Championship bout between YA-MAN and Hiroto Yamaguchi was booked as the even headliner, while the semifinals of the RISE -54 kg World Series Tournament served as the leadup toward the main event.

=== Fight Card ===
RISE World Series 2023 - 2nd Round
Weight Class				Method	Round	Time	Notes
Super lightweight 65 kg	(Japan) YA-MAN	def.	(Japan) Hiroto Yamaguchi	TKO (4 Knockdowns)	2	1:05	For the inaugural RISE OFG Super Lightweight (-65kg) Championship.
Catchweight 54 kg	(Japan) Toki Tamaru	def.	(Japan) Kazuki Osaki	Decision (Majority)	3	3:00	RISE -54 kg World Series Tournament Semifinal.
Catchweight 54 kg	(Thailand) Kumandoi Petcharoenvit	def.	(Japan) Shiro	Decision (Majority)	3	3:00	RISE -54 kg World Series Tournament Semifinal.
Lightweight 63 kg	(Japan) Hideki Sasaki	def.	(South Korea) Chan Hyung Lee	Decision (Unanimous)	3	3:00	Sasaki retirement bout.
Lightweight 63 kg	(Japan) Kan Nakamura	def.	(Kazakhstan) Alisher Karmenov	NC (Shoulder injury)	1		Bout declared a no contest after Nakamura dislocated his shoulder.
Super featherweight 60 kg	(Japan) Taiga	def.	(Japan) Hyuma Hitachi	Ext. R. Decision (Unanimous)	3	3:00	
Bantamweight 55 kg	(Japan) Koki Osaki	def.	(Japan) Yugo Kato	Decision (Unanimous)	3	3:00	RISE Bantamweight (-55kg) title eliminator.
Atomweight 46 kg	(Japan) Koyuki Miyazaki	def.	(Thailand) Jumliat SuratThaniRajanhat	KO (Left hook to the body)	1	3:00	.
Featherweight 57.5 kg	(Japan) Kaito Sakaguchi	def.	(Japan) Haruto Yasumoto	Decision (Unanimous)	3	3:00	.
Super lightweight 65 kg	(Australia) Chadd Collins	def.	(South Korea) Kyung Jae Cho	KO (Head kick)	1	2:17	.
Catchweight 54 kg	(Japan) Jin Mandokoro	def.	(Spain) Ruben Seoane	TKO (Three knockdowns)	2	1:55	RISE -54 kg World Series Tournament reserve bout.
Catchweight 54 kg	(Japan) Ryu Hanaoka	def.	(France) Nicolas Rivas	Decision (Unanimous)	3	3:00	.
Super lightweight 65 kg	(Japan) Yutaro Asahi	def.	(Japan) KENTA	Decision (Unanimous)	3	3:00	.
Flyweight 51.5 kg	(Japan) Ryujin Nasukawa	def.	(Japan) Jin	Decision (Unanimous)	3	3:00	.
Preliminary Card
Super featherweight 60 kg	(Japan) Ryusho Toda	def.	(Japan) Soma Higashi	KO (Head kick)	2	1:57	.
Atomweight 46 kg	(Japan) Miyu Sakata	draw.	(Japan) Honoka Kobayashi	Decision (Split)	3	3:00	.
Catchweight 53 kg	(Japan) Nonoka Kato	def.	(Japan) Hotaru	Decision (Majority)	3	3:00	.

== RISE WEST 20 ==
RISE WEST 20
- Promotion: RISE
- Date: October 1, 2023
- Venue: Nishitetsu Hall
- City: Fukuoka, Japan

RISE WEST 20 was a kickboxing event that was held by RISE, on October 1, 2023, in Fukuoka, Japan.

=== Background ===
A featherweight bout between Kakeru and Kaito Tsuzuki was booked as the main event.

=== Fight Card ===
RISE WEST 20
Weight Class				Method	Round	Time	Notes
Featherweight 57.5 kg	(Japan) Kakeru	def.	(Japan) Kaito Tsuzuki	TKO (Doctor stoppage)	2	0:02	Tsuzuki was deducted two points prior to the fight due to missing weight.
Middleweight 70 kg	(Japan) Negimajin	def.	(Japan) Yasuyuki Nojiri	KO (Left hook)	2	1:34	
Welterweight 67.5 kg	(Japan) Strong Kobayashi	def.	(Japan) Taiki Iwamasa	TKO (Punches)	1	1:19	
Bantamweight 55 kg	(Japan) Ren Kikukawa	def.	(Japan) Shogo Yamazaki	Decision (Unanimous)	3	3:00	
Catchweight 54 kg	(Japan) Naoyuki Irie	def.	(Japan) Chainsaw Man Sakata	KO (Right straight)	2	0:10	
Flyweight 52 kg	(Japan) Nonoka Kato	def.	(Japan) Ruka	Decision (Majority)	3	3:00	
Atomweight 46 kg	(Japan) Yuika Iwanaga	def.	(Japan) Sea	Decision (Unanimous)	3	3:00	
Super featherweight 60 kg	(Japan) Sho Arao	def.	(Japan) Phakchi Okuda	Decision (Majority)	3	3:00	
Bantamweight 55 kg	(Japan) Masaya	def.	(Japan) Okkasan	KO (Right straight)	3	2:09	

== RISE 172 ==
RISE 172
- Promotion: RISE
- Date: October 29, 2023
- Venue: Nishitetsu Hall
- City: Tokyo, Japan

RISE 172 was a kickboxing event that was held by RISE, on October 29, 2023, in Tokyo, Japan.

=== Background ===
Two title fights were held at the event: a RISE Featherweight Championship bout between champion Keisuke Monguchi and challenger Kaito Sakaguchi, as well as a vacant RISE Flyweight Championship bout between Riku Kazushima and Tenshi Matsumoto.

=== Fight Card ===
RISE 172
Weight Class				Method	Round	Time	Notes
Featherweight 57.5 kg	(Japan) Keisuke Monguchi (c)	def.	(Japan) Kaito Sakaguchi	Decision (Unanimous)	5	3:00	For the RISE Featherweight Championship.
Flyweight 51.5 kg	(Japan) Riku Kazushima	def.	(Japan) Tenshi Matsumoto	Decision (Unanimous)	5	3:00	For the vacant RISE Flyweight Championship.
Featherweight 57.5 kg	(Japan) Taisei Umei	vs.	(Thailand) Warm Onelink	NC (Low blow)	1	0:37	Umei was unable to continue competing after suffering a low blow.
Lightweight 63 kg	(Japan) Sumiya Ito	def.	(Japan) Tomohiro Kitai	Decision (Unanimous)	3	3:00	
Middleweight 70 kg	(Japan) Motoyasuku	def.	(Japan) Takuya Imamura	Decision (Unanimous)	3	3:00	
Flyweight 51.5 kg	(Japan) Momu Tsukamoto	def.	(Japan) Yuzuki Sakai	Decision (Unanimous)	3	3:00	
Bantamweight 55 kg	(Japan) Musashi Matsushita	def.	(Japan) Hyuga Umemoto	Decision (Unanimous)	3	3:00	
Super featherweight 60 kg	(Japan) Kenshin Yamamoto	def.	(Japan) SEIDO	Ext. R. Decision (Unanimous)	3	3:00	
Super flyweight 53 kg	(Japan) Shota Toyama	def.	(Japan) Raize	Decision (Unanimous)	3	3:00	
Super lightweight 65 kg	(Japan) Yuta Take	def.	(Japan) Yudai Arai	KO (Right hook)	1	1:08	
Super flyweight 53 kg	(Japan) Fuga Tokoro	def.	(Japan) Tensuke Yamasaki	Decision (Unanimous)	3	3:00	
Mini flyweight 49 kg	(Japan) Mei Miyamoto	def.	(Japan) Nanami Kazushima	Decision (Unanimous)	3	3:00	Kazushima was deducted one point in the third round for excessive clinching.

== RISE 173 ==
RISE 173
- Promotion: RISE
- Date: November 18, 2023
- Venue: Korakuen Hall
- City: Tokyo, Japan

RISE 173 was a kickboxing event that was held by RISE, on November 18, 2023, in Tokyo, Japan.

=== Background ===
The RISE New Warriors Tournament, held to determine the next RISE Super Flyweight title challenger, was held during the event. A RISE Women's Mini Flyweight Championship bout between Arina Kobayashi and erika❤️ served as the co-main event.

=== Fight Card ===
RISE 173
Weight Class				Method	Round	Time	Notes
Super flyweight 53 kg	(Japan) Jin Mandokoro	def.	(Japan) Kaito Hasegawa	Decision (Unanimous)	3	3:00	RISE New Warriors Tournament Final; RISE Super Flyweight title eliminator.
Mini flyweight 49 kg	(Japan) Arina Kobayashi	def.	(Japan) erika❤️ (c)	KO (Punches)	2	0:11	For the RISE Queen Mini Flyweight (-49kg) Championship.
Featherweight 57.5 kg	(Japan) Haruto Yasumoto	def.	(Japan) Taiki Sawatani	Decision (Unanimous)	3	3:00	
Lightweight 63 kg	(Japan) Ryuto Shiokawa	def.	(Japan) Yuma Yamahata	Decision (Majority)	3	3:00	
Mini flyweight 49 kg	(Japan) Wakana Miyazaki	def.	(Japan) Melty Kira	Decision (Unanimous)	3	3:00	
Bantamweight 55 kg	(Japan) Kyosuke	def.	(Japan) Rikiya	Decision (Majority)	3	3:00	
Super lightweight 65 kg	(Japan) Yuki Tanaka	def.	(Japan) Jin Ishida	KO (Spinning back kick)	1	0:42	
Super flyweight 53 kg	(Japan) Kaito Hasegawa	def.	(Japan) HIROYUKI	TKO (Two knockdowns)	3	0:54	RISE New Warriors Tournament Semifinal.
Super flyweight 53 kg	(Japan) Jin Mandokoro	def.	(Japan) Ryu Hanaoka	TKO (Two knockdowns)	1	2:15	RISE New Warriors Tournament Semifinal.
Bantamweight 55 kg	(Japan) Ryu Matsunaga	def.	(Japan) Tomoya Fukui	Decision (Unanimous)	3	3:00	
Middleweight 70 kg	(Japan) Seiya Ogawa	def.	(Japan) Bashi Crab Shrimp	KO (Left hook)	1	2:49	

== RISE 174 ==
RISE 174
- Promotion: RISE
- Date: December 10, 2023
- Venue: Korakuen Hall
- City: Tokyo, Japan

RISE 174 was a kickboxing event that was held by RISE, on December 10, 2023, in Tokyo, Japan.

=== Fight Card ===
RISE 174
Weight Class				Method	Round	Time	Notes
Bantamweight 55 kg	(Japan) Koki Osaki	def.	(Japan) Masahiko Suzuki (c)	Decision (Unanimous)	5	3:00	For the RISE Bantamweight (-55kg) title.
Bantamweight 55 kg	(Japan) Yugo Kato	def.	(Japan) Shoa Arii	Decision (Majority)	3	3:00	
Welterweight 67.5 kg	(Japan) Ryoya Inai	def.	(Japan) Taichi Ishikawa	KO (Left hook)	3	1:07	
Middleweight 70 kg	(Japan) YUYA	def.	(Thailand) Franck Chan	Decision (Unanimous)	3	3:00	
Featherweight 57.5 kg	(Japan) Ryoga Hirano	def.	(Japan) Kengo	KO (Left hook)	1	2:33	
Featherweight 57.5 kg	(Japan) Daiki Toita	def.	(Japan) Shun Shiraishi	KO (High kick)	2	0:30	
Lightweight 63 kg	(Japan) Hyu	def.	(Japan) Kanta Motoyama	Decision (Unanimous)	3	3:00	
Bantamweight 55 kg	(Japan) Knight Makino	def.	(Japan) Toshitaka Himizu	KO (Right hook)	2	1:26	
Flyweight 51.5 kg	(Japan) Blackshisa Sotaro	def.	(Japan) Shuma	Decision (Unanimous)	3	3:00	
Featherweight 57.5 kg	(Japan) Shun Matsuyama	def.	(Japan) Shosuke Iwanaga	Decision (Unanimous)	3	3:00	
Super Lightweight 65 kg	(Japan) Kazuteru Yamazaki	def.	(Japan) Shota	Decision (Unanimous)	3	3:00	

== RISE World Series 2023 - Final Round ==
RISE World Series 2023 - Final Round
- Promotion: RISE
- Date: December 16, 2023
- Venue: Ryogoku Kokugikan
- City: Tokyo, Japan

RISE World Series 2023 - Final Round was a kickboxing event that was held by RISE, on December 16, 2023, in Tokyo, Japan.

=== 2024 RISE -54kg World Series bracket ===
Quarterfinals (2023-07-02) RISE World Series 2023 - 1st Round
(Japan) Toki Tamaru	KO
(Thailand) Petchsila Wor.Auracha	1
(Japan) Kazuki Osaki	TKO
(France) Aiman Lahmar	2
(Thailand) Kumandoi Petchyindee Academy	UD
(Belgium) Mohammed Kloua	3
(Japan) Shiro	UD
(Spain) Ruben Seoane	3

Semifinals (2023-08-26) RISE World Series 2023 - 2nd Round
(Japan) Toki Tamaru	MD
(Japan) Kazuki Osaki	3
(Japan) Shiro	3
(Thailand) Kumandoi Petchyindee Academy	UD

Final
(Japan) Toki Tamaru	UD
(Thailand) Kumandoi Petchyindee Academy	3

=== Fight Card ===
RISE World Series 2023 - Final Round
Weight Class				Method	Round	Time	Notes
Catchweight 54 kg	(Japan) Toki Tamaru	def.	(Thailand) Kumandoi Petchyindee Academy	Decision (Unanimous)	3	3:00	For the 2023 RISE World Series -54kg title.
Super Lightweight 65 kg	(Australia) Chadd Collins	def.	(Thailand) Petpanomrung Kiatmuu9 (c)	Decision (Unanimous)	5	3:00	For the RISE Super Lightweight (-65 kg) World title.
Super Lightweight 65 kg	(Japan) Kento Haraguchi	def.	(Mexico) Abraham Vidales	TKO (Right cross)	2	1:49	RISExGLORY
Super Lightweight 65 kg	(Japan) Taiju Shiratori	def.	(Morocco) Zakaria Zouggary	KO (Knee to the head)	3	1:27	RISExGLORY
Catchweight 72 kg	(Japan) Kaito	def.	(France) James Condé	TKO (3 Knockdowns)	1	2:06	Shootboxing cooperation bout
Lightweight 63 kg	(Japan) Kan Nakamura	def.	(Morocco) Ahmed Akoudad	KO (Right cross)	2	1:31	RISExGLORY
Light Heavyweight 90 kg	(Japan) Kenta Nanbara	def.	(Netherlands) Victor de Koning	Ext.R KO (Punches)	4	1:01	RISExGLORY
Catchweight 54 kg	(Japan) Seina	def.	(Netherlands) Tessa de Kom	Decision (Unanimous)	3	3:00	RISExGLORY
Welterweight 67.5 kg	(Moldova) Petru Morari	def.	(Japan) Ryota Nakano	Decision (Majority)	3	3:00	RISExGLORY
Kazane retirement ceremony
Catchweight 55.5 kg	(Japan) Shiro	def.	(Thailand) Boonlong Petchyindee Academy	TKO (Right cross)	1	2:28	
Catchweight 54 kg	(Japan) Kazuki Osaki	def.	(Thailand) Jaroensuk BoonlannaMuaythai	Ext.R Decision (Split)	4	3:00	
W.Atomweight 46 kg	(Japan) Koyuki Miyazaki	def.	(Thailand) Mongkutpetch KhaolakMuaythai	Decision (Unanimous)	3	3:00	
W.Atomweight 46 kg	(Japan) Koji Ikeda	def.	(Japan) Musashi Matsushita	Decision (Majority)	3	3:00	
Super Featherweight 60 kg	(Japan) Hyuma Hitachi	def.	(Japan) Katsuji	KO (Left hook)	2	2:19	
Super Featherweight 60 kg	(Japan) Taisei Iwagoe	def.	(Japan) Shota Okudaira	Decision (Majority)	3	3:00	
Flyweight 51.5 kg	(Japan) Ryujin Nasukawa	def.	(Japan) Ryotaro	TKO (Doctor stoppage)	3	2:04	
Preliminary Card
Super Featherweight 60 kg	(Japan) Naofumi Yamashina	def.	(Japan) Taisei Kondo	KO (Right cross)	3	1:33	
W.Bantamweight 55 kg	(Netherlands) Montana Aerts	def.	(Japan) Nonoka Kato	Decision (Unanimous)	3	3:00	
Featherweight 57.5 kg	(Japan) Shinnosuke Nagamatsu	def.	(Japan) Goki Sugiyama	KO (Right cross)	3	3:00	

== See also ==
- 2023 in K-1
- 2023 in ONE Championship
- 2023 in Romanian kickboxing
- 2023 in Wu Lin Feng
