= Akari (kickboxer) =

Japanese kickboxer

AKARI
- Born: Akari Watanabe; December 8, 2003 (age 22); Adachi, Tokyo, Japan
- Native name: 渡邊 星
- Nickname: Beautiful Exploding Legs Cinderella
- Nationality: Japanese
- Height: 163 cm (5 ft 4 in)
- Weight: 49 kg (108 lb; 7 st 10 lb)
- Style: Kickboxing
- Stance: Orthodox
- Fighting out of: Toshima, Tokyo, Japan
- Team: TARGET
- Trainer: Erika Kamimura
- Years active: 2019–2024

Kickboxing record
- Total: 13
- Wins: 10
- By knockout: 1
- Losses: 3
- By knockout: 0

Akari Watanabe (Japanese: 渡邊 星, Watanabe Akari; born December 8, 2003), more popularly known by her ring name AKARI, is a retired Japanese professional kickboxer. She was the 2021 RISE NEXT QUEEN Tournament winner and a two-time RISE Women's Mini Flyweight title challenger.

Between November 2023 and May 2024, she was ranked as one of the ten best women's strawweight kickboxers in the world.

== Kickboxing career ==
Akari made her professional kickboxing debut against Eriko at RISE WORLD SERIES 2019 Final Round on September 16, 2019. She won the fight by unanimous decision, with two scorecards of 30–28 and one scorecard of 29–28 in her favor.

Akari faced Wakana Miyazaki at the inaugural RISE GIRLS POWER event on November 8, 2019. She won the fight by unanimous decision. Akari next faced Ran at RISE GIRLS POWER 2 on February 11, 2020. She won the fight by unanimous decision.

Akari was expected to face Moe Okura at RISE 141 on August 23, 2020. Okura withdrew from the bout on August 7, after contracting COVID-19, and was replaced by Maki Goto. She won the fight by unanimous decision, with two ringside officials awarding her a 30–28 scorecard, while the third judge scored the contest an even 29–29.

Akari faced Yurika Jimbo at Rise 144 on December 18, 2020. She won the fight by unanimous decision, with scores of 30–28, 30–28 and 29–28.

On February 22, 2021, it was announced that Akari would face Wakana Miyazaki in the semifinals of the RISE NEXT QUEEN Mini Flyweight (-49 kg) tournament, held on March 28, 2021. She won the fight by unanimous decision and advanced to the finals of the one-day tournament, where she faced Moe Okura. Akari won the fight by split decision, with scores of 30–29, 29–28 and 28–29.

Akari challenged Hinata Terayama for the RISE Women's Mini Flyweight (–49 kg) Championship at RISE on Abema 2 on May 16, 2021. Terayama won the fight by unanimous decision, winning 48–47 on all three judges scorecards.

Akari faced YAYA in a flyweight (-52 kg) bout at RISE Girls Power 5 on September 12, 2021. Akari was able to knock her opponent down with a left straight near the end of the opening round. This knockdown caused an ankle injury, which forced YAYA to retire from the contest 10 seconds into the second round.

Akari faced erika♡ at RISE 153 on December 12, 2021. The fight was ruled a draw by unanimous decision after the first three rounds were contested. erika was awarded a unanimous decision win after an extra fourth round was fought.

Akari faced Wakana Miyazaki in the semifinals of the RISE Mini Flyweight Championship tournament at RISE 157 on April 24, 2022. She was able to overcome Miyazaki by split decision, with scores of 29–28, 29–28 and 29–30. Akari faced erika♡ in the tournament final at RISE 159 on June 24, 2022. She lost the fight by unanimous decision, with scores of 50–48, 49–47 and 50–46.

Akari faced the #4 ranked RISE mini-flyweight contender Eriko at RISE 162 on October 30, 2022. She won the fight by unanimous decision.

Akari announced her retirement from competition on September 20, 2024.

== Championships and accomplishments ==
=== Amateur ===
- RISE
  - 2018 KAMINARIMON All Japan Women's Flyweight (-52 kg) Tournament Winner

=== Professional ===
- RISE
  - 2021 RISE NEXT QUEEN Mini Flyweight (-49 kg) Tournament Winner
  - 2022 RISE Mini Flyweight (-49 kg) Championship Tournament Runner-up

== Fight record ==
Professional Kickboxing Record
10 Wins (1 (T)KOs), 3 Losses, 0 Draws
Date	Result	Opponent	Event	Location	Method	Round	Time
2022-10-30	Win	(Japan) Eriko	RISE 162	Tokyo, Japan	Decision (Unanimous)	3	3:00
2022-06-24	Loss	(Japan) erika❤️	RISE 159	Tokyo, Japan	Decision (Unanimous)	5	3:00
For the RISE Women's Mini Flyweight (–49 kg) Championship.
2022-04-24	Win	(Japan) Wakana Miyazaki	RISE 157 - Tournament Semifinal	Tokyo, Japan	Decision (Split)	3	3:00
2021-12-12	Loss	(Japan) erika❤️	RISE 153	Tokyo, Japan	Decision (Unanimous)	3	3:00
2021-09-12	Win	(Japan) YAYA	RISE Girls Power 5	Tokyo, Japan	TKO (Injury to ankle)	2	0:04
2021-06-15	Loss	(Japan) Hinata Terayama	RISE on Abema 2	Tokyo, Japan	Decision (Unanimous)	5	3:00
For the RISE Women's Mini Flyweight (–49 kg) Championship.
2021-03-28	Win	(Japan) Moe Okura	RISE 147, Tournament Final	Tokyo, Japan	Decision (Split)	3	3:00
Wins the RISE NEXT QUEEN Mini Flyweight (-49 kg) Tournament.
2021-03-28	Win	(Japan) Wakana Miyazaki	RISE 147, Tournament Semifinal	Tokyo, Japan	Decision (Unanimous)	3	3:00
2020-12-18	Win	(Japan) Yurika Jimbo	RISE 144	Tokyo, Japan	Decision (Unanimous)	3	3:00
2020-12-18	Win	(Japan) Maki Goto	RISE 141	Tokyo, Japan	Decision (Majority)	3	3:00
2020-02-11	Win	(Japan) Ran	RISE Girls Power 2	Tokyo, Japan	Decision (Unanimous)	3	3:00
2019-11-08	Win	(Japan) Wakana Miyazaki	RISE Girls Power	Tokyo, Japan	Decision (Unanimous)	3	3:00
2019-09-18	Win	(Japan) Eriko	RISE WORLD SERIES 2019 Final Round	Tokyo, Japan	Decision (Unanimous)	3	3:00
Legend: Win Loss Draw/No contest Notes

Amateur Kickboxing Record
Date	Result	Opponent	Event	Location	Method	Round	Time
2019-06-02	Win	(Japan) Sakika Ito	KAMINARIMON	Tokyo, Japan	Decision (Unanimous)	2	1:30
2019-06-02	Win	(Japan) Yukari Kobayashi	KAMINARIMON	Tokyo, Japan	TKO	1	
2019-04-14	Win	(Japan) Moe Shimizu	KAMINARIMON	Tokyo, Japan	Decision (Majority)	2	1:30
2018-10-21	Loss	(Japan) Koko Ohara	KAMINARIMON	Tokyo, Japan	Decision (Unanimous)	2	1:30
2018-08-05	Win	(Japan) Megumi Inoue	KAMINARIMON All Japan Tournament, Final	Tokyo, Japan	Decision (Unanimous)	2	1:30
Wins the 2018 KAMINARIMON All Japan Women's Flyweight (-52 kg) Tournament.
2018-08-05	Win	(Japan) Satsuki Murakami	KAMINARIMON All Japan Tournament, Semifinal	Tokyo, Japan	Decision (Majority)	2	1:30
2018-03-11	Win	(Japan) Miyu Nakamura	Shootboxing	Tokyo, Japan	KO	1	
2016-12-11	Loss	(Japan) Koyo Highashi	KAMINARIMON	Tokyo, Japan	Decision (Unanimous)	2	1:30
2016-10-09	Loss	(Japan) Bunto Takasaka	KAMINARIMON	Tokyo, Japan	Decision (Unanimous)	2	1:30
2014-12-14	Loss	(Japan) Shota Noda	KAMINARIMON	Tokyo, Japan	Decision (Majority)	2	1:30
2014-10-19	Loss	(Japan) Renichi Hishinuma	WPMF & BOM Amateur Tournament	Tokyo, Japan	Decision (Unanimous)	2	1:30
Legend: Win Loss Draw/No contest Notes

== See also ==
- List of female kickboxers
