= Toki Oshika =

Japanese kickboxer

- Born: 大鹿統毅; March 12, 2005 (age 21); Hiratsuka, Japan
- Height: 166 cm (5 ft 5 in)
- Weight: 55 kg (121 lb; 8.7 st)
- Division: Bantamweight; Super Bantamweight
- Style: Kickboxing, Karate
- Stance: Orthodox
- Fighting out of: Tokyo, Japan
- Team: K-1 Gym Sohonbu Team Pegasus (2022-Present); Ōshika Dojo Shonan Kakuto Club

Kickboxing record
- Total: 15
- Wins: 13
- By knockout: 1
- Losses: 2
- Draws: 0

Toki Oshika is a Japanese kickboxer.

As of December 2025, Oshika was the #9 ranked -55 kg kickboxer in the world according to Beyond Kickboxing.

== Career ==
On August 29, 2021, Oshika faced Yasunari Mashiko at Bigbang 39. He won the fight by unanimous decision.

On November 14, 2021, Oshika faced Hayata Nishimaki at Super Bigbang 2021. The fight was stopped in the second round after a low blow and went to the scorecard with Oshika winning a unanimous technical decision.

On May 20, 2023, Oshika took part in a 4-man tournament at Krush 149 for the vacant Krush Flyweight title. In the semifinals he defeated Tsubasa Yamawaki by first round technical knockout. In the final Daina by unanimous decision to capture the title.

Oshika made the first defense of his Krush Flyweight title on October 21, 2023, at Krush 153 against Yuto. He lost by knockout only 47 seconds into the fight following a left hook.

On December 8, 2024, Oshika faced Koki at Krush 169. He lost the fight by majority decision.

On August 23, 2025, Oshika faced Chikara Iwao at Krush 179. He won the fight by unanimous decision

Oshika faced Koji Ikeda at K-1 World MAX 2025 - 70kg World Championship Tournament Final on November 15, 2025. He won the fight by unanimous decision.

== Titles and accomplishments ==
=== Kickboxing ===
==== Professional ====
- Krush
  - 2023 Krush Flyweight (-51.5kg) Champion

==== Amateur ====
- 2016 KAMINARIMON All Japan Junior -35 kg Champion
- 2018 KAMINARIMON All Japan Junior -40 kg Champion
- 2019 Bigbang -45 kg Champion
- 2019 KAMINARIMON All Japan Junior -45 kg Runner-up
- 2021 Amateur Kickboxing Council All Japan -55 kg Champion
- 2022 K-1 Koshien East Japan Tournament -55 kg Winner
- 2022 K-1 Koshien Tournament -55 kg Winner

=== Karate ===
- 2017 IBKO All Japan Jr. Middle School -50 kg runner-up
- 2019 JKJO East Japan Middle School -47 kg Champion
- 2019 IKO WORLD SO-Kyokushin All Japan Jr. Middle School runner-up

== Kickboxing record ==
Professional Kickboxing Record
13 Wins (1 (T)KO's), 2 Losses, 0 Draw, 0 No Contest
| Date | Result | Opponent | Event | Location | Method | Round | Time |
| 2026-12-20 | | (Spain) Aymar Arias | RISE World Series 2026 Tokyo Final -55kg Tournament, Quarterfinals | Tokyo, Japan | | | |
| 2026-09-19 | Win | (Japan) Ryoya Ito | RISE World Series 2026 Tokyo 2 | Tokyo, Japan | Decision (unanimous) | 3 | 3:00 |
| 2025-11-15 | Win | (Japan) Koji Ikeda | K-1 World MAX 2025 - 70kg World Championship Tournament Final | Tokyo, Japan | Decision (unanimous) | 3 | 3:00 |
| 2025-08-23 | Win | (Japan) Chikara Iwao | Krush 179 | Tokyo, Japan | Decision (unanimous) | 3 | 3:00 |
| 2025-03-30 | Win | (Japan) Kensuke | Krush 172 | Tokyo, Japan | Ext.R Decision (split) | 4 | 3:00 |
| 2024-12-08 | Loss | (Japan) Koki | Krush 169 | Tokyo, Japan | Decision (majority) | 3 | 3:0 |
| 2024-09-28 | Win | (Japan) Rikiya Yamaura | Krush 165 | Tokyo, Japan | Dcision (unanimous) | 3 | 3:0 |
| 2023-10-21 | Loss | (Japan) Yuto | Krush 153 | Tokyo, Japan | KO (left hook) | 1 | 0:47 |
Loses the Krush Flyweight (-51.5kg) title.
| 2023-05-20 | Win | (Japan) Daina | Krush 149 - Flyweight Championship Tournament, Final | Tokyo, Japan | Decision (unanimous) | 3 | 3:00 |
Wins the vacant Krush Flyweight (-51.5kg) title.
| 2023-05-20 | Win | (Japan) Tsubasa Yamawaki | Krush 149 - Flyweight Championship Tournament, Semi Final | Tokyo, Japan | TKO (2 knockdowns) | 1 | 1:23 |
| 2022-12-18 | Win | (Japan) Shohei Nishibayashi | Krush 144 | Tokyo, Japan | Decision (unanimous) | 3 | 3:00 |
| 2022-03-20 | Win | (Japan) Rui Kasami | Bigbang 41 | Tokyo, Japan | Decision (unanimous) | 3 | 3:00 |
| 2021-11-14 | Win | (Japan) Hayata Nishimaki | Super Bigbang 2021 | Tokyo, Japan | Tech. Decision (unanimous) | 1 | |
| 2021-08-29 | Win | (Japan) Yasunari Mashiko | Bigbang 39 | Tokyo, Japan | Decision (unanimous) | 3 | 3:00 |
| 2021-07-04 | Win | (Japan) Aiki | Bigbang the Future 28 | Tokyo, Japan | Decision (unanimous) | 3 | 3:00 |
| 2021-05-16 | Win | (Japan) Kodai Hoshino | Bigbang the Future 27 | Tokyo, Japan | Decision (unanimous) | 3 | 3:00 |
Legend: Win Loss Draw/No contest Notes

=== Amateur record ===
Amateur Kickboxing Record
| Date | Result | Opponent | Event | Location | Method | Round | Time |
|---|---|---|---|---|---|---|---|
| 2022-08-21 | Win | (Japan) Toya Matsuba | K-1 Koshien 2022 Tournament, Final | Tokyo, Japan | Decision (majority) | 1 | 3:00 |
Wins 2022 K-1 Koshien -55kg Tournament.
| 2022-08-21 | Win | (Japan) Ryuki Yasuo | K-1 Koshien 2022 Tournament, Semi Final | Tokyo, Japan | Decision (unanimous) | 1 | 2:00 |
| 2022-08-21 | Win | (Japan) Takumi Yoshimura | K-1 Koshien 2022 Tournament, Quarter Final | Tokyo, Japan | Decision (unanimous) | 1 | 2:00 |
| 2022-08-21 | Win | (Japan) Kou Hasegawa | K-1 Koshien 2022 Tournament, First Round | Tokyo, Japan | Decision (unanimous) | 1 | 2:00 |
| 2022-07-24 | Win | (Japan) Ryuki Kawano | K-1 Koshien 2022 East Japan Tournament, Final | Tokyo, Japan | Decision (unanimous) | 1 | 2:00 |
Wins 2022 K-1 Koshien East Japan -55kg Tournament.
| 2022-07-24 | Win | (Japan) Shuri Sakayori | K-1 Koshien 2022 East Japan Tournament, Semi Finals | Tokyo, Japan | Decision (unanimous) | 1 | 2:00 |
| 2022-07-24 | Win | (Japan) Reion Takahashi | K-1 Koshien 2022 East Japan Tournament, Quarter Finals | Tokyo, Japan | Decision (unanimous) | 1 | 2:00 |
| 2022-07-24 | Win | (Japan) Manatsu Kuroda | K-1 Koshien 2022 East Japan Tournament, 1/8 Finals | Tokyo, Japan | KO (punches) | 1 | |
| 2021-03-20 | Loss | (Japan) Rui Okubo | Dageki Kakutougi Japan Cup 2021, Quarter Final | Tokyo, Japan | Decision (unanimous) | 1 | 3:00 |
| 2021-02-23 | Win | (Japan) Mao Ishimoto | Amateur Kickboxing Council All Japan Tournament, Final | Tokyo, Japan | TKO (corner stoppage) | 2 | 2:00 |
Wins AKC All Japan Junior -55kg title.
| 2021-02-23 | Win | (Japan) Takuto Kobayashi | Amateur Kickboxing Council All Japan Tournament, Semi Final | Tokyo, Japan | Decision (unanimous) | 2 | 2:00 |
| 2021-02-23 | Win | (Japan) Genki Onoda | Amateur Kickboxing Council All Japan Tournament, Quarter Final | Tokyo, Japan | Decision (unanimous) | 2 | 2:00 |
| 2021-02-21 | Loss | (Japan) Rui Okubo | SMASHERS 2021 | Tokyo, Japan | Decision (unanimous) | 2 | 2:00 |
| 2021-02-21 | Draw | (Japan) Riku Otsu | SMASHERS 2021 | Tokyo, Japan | Decision | 2 | 2:00 |
| 2021-02-07 | Win | (Japan) Shojiro Watanabe | KAMINARIMON | Tokyo, Japan | Decision (unanimous) | 2 | 2:00 |
| 2020-12-06 | Win | (Japan) Daiki Yamaguchi | KAMINARIMON | Tokyo, Japan | KO | 2 | |
| 2020-11-22 | Win | (Japan) Riku Otsu | DEAD HEAT | Tokyo, Japan | Decision (unanimous) | 2 | 2:00 |
| 2019-12-08 | Loss | (Japan) Sota Fukudome | KAMINARIMON All Japan Tournament, Final | Tokyo, Japan | Decision (split) | 1 | 2:00 |
For the KAMIANRIMON All Japan -45kg title.
| 2019-12-08 | Win | (Japan) Kai Sato | KAMINARIMON All Japan Tournament, Semi Final | Tokyo, Japan | Decision (unanimous) | 1 | 2:00 |
| 2019-12-08 | Win | (Japan) Reona Anjiki | KAMINARIMON All Japan Tournament, Quarter Final | Tokyo, Japan | Decision (unanimous) | 1 | 2:00 |
| 2019-11-03 | Win | (Japan) | Bigbang Isehara 2019 | Tokyo, Japan | Decision | | |
Defends Bigbang -45kg title.
| 2019-10-10 | Win | (Japan) | Bigbang Amateur | Tokyo, Japan | Decision | | |
Wins Bigbang -45kg title.
| 2019-07-21 | Loss | (Japan) Rui Okubo | NJKF Explosion 22, WBC Muay Thai Jr league Selection Final | Tokyo, Japan | Decision | 2 | 1:30 |
| 2019-07-21 | Win | (Japan) Riku Otsu | NJKF EXPLOSION 22 - WBC Muay Thai Jr League Selection, Semi Final | Tokyo, Japan | Decision | 2 | 1:30 |
| 2019-05-12 | Draw | (Japan) Ryujin Nasukawa | KAMINARIMON | Tokyo, Japan | Decision | 2 | 2:00 |
| 2019-03-29 | Win | (Thailand) | | Ko Samui, Thailand | KO | 2 | |
| 2019-05-12 | Win | (Japan) Shota Kunioka | KAMINARIMON | Tokyo, Japan | Decision (majority) | 2 | 2:00 |
| 2019-02-24 | Win | (Japan) Akito Ono | KAMINARIMON | Tokyo, Japan | Decision (unanimous) | 2 | 2:00 |
| 2019-02-24 | Win | (Japan) Riku Otsu | KAMINARIMON | Tokyo, Japan | Decision (unanimous) | 2 | 2:00 |
| 2018-12-16 | Loss | (Japan) Hayato Kai | WMC Japan Amateur, Semi Final | Tokyo, Japan | Decision (unanimous) | 2 | 2:00 |
| 2018-12-02 | Win | (Japan) Shoki Hoshikubo | KAMINARIMON All Japan Tournament, Final | Tokyo, Japan | Decision (unanimous) | 1 | 2:00 |
Wins KAMIANRIMON All Japan -40kg title.
| 2018-12-02 | Win | (Japan) Tsugumi Hirai | KAMINARIMON All Japan Tournament, Semi Final | Tokyo, Japan | Decision (majority) | 1 | 2:00 |
| 2018-12-02 | Win | (Japan) Shota Kunioka | KAMINARIMON All Japan Tournament, Quarter Final | Tokyo, Japan | Decision (unanimous) | 1 | 2:00 |
| 2018-11-04 | Win | (Japan) Takuto Kobayashi | Bigbang Amateur 49 | Tokyo, Japan | Decision (unanimous) | 2 | 1:30 |
| 2018-05-13 | Loss | (Japan) Shoki Hoshikubo | SMASHERS 194 | Tokyo, Japan | Decision (unanimous) | 2 | 2:00 |
| 2018-04-08 | Loss | (Japan) Shimon Yoshinari | BOM Amateur 23 | Tokyo, Japan | Decision | 2 | 2:00 |
| 2018-04-08 | Loss | (Japan) Hibiki Seto | BOM Amateur 23 | Tokyo, Japan | Decision | 2 | 2:00 |
| 2018-02-18 | Win | (Japan) Tsubasa Nio | Bigbang Amateur 44 | Tokyo, Japan | Decision (unanimous) | 2 | 1:30 |
| 2018-01-21 | Loss | (Japan) Rui Okubo | SMASHERS 192 | Tokyo, Japan | Decision (unanimous) | 2 | 1:30 |
| 2018-01-21 | Win | (Japan) Taison Maeda | SMASHERS 192 | Tokyo, Japan | Decision (unanimous) | 2 | 1:30 |
| 2017-12-10 | Loss | (Japan) Momo Shimizu | KAMINARIMON All Japan Tournament, Semi Final | Tokyo, Japan | Decision (split) | 1 | 2:00 |
| 2017-11-05 | Loss | (Japan) Shimon Yoshinari | BOM Amateur 21 | Kanagawa, Japan | Decision | 2 | 2:00 |
| 2017-11-05 | Loss | (Japan) Noa Fujiwara | BOM Amateur 21 | Kanagawa, Japan | Decision | 2 | 2:00 |
| 2017-06-25 | Loss | (Japan) Shimon Yoshinari | BOM Amateur, 40 kg Tournament Semi Final | Kanagawa, Japan | Decision | 2 | 2:00 |
| 2017-02-26 | Loss | (Japan) Ryoga Terayama | KAMINARIMON | Tokyo, Japan | Decision (unanimous) | 2 | 2:00 |
| 2016-12-11 | Win | (Japan) Hikaru Kushida | KAMINARIMON All Japan Tournament, Final | Tokyo, Japan | Decision (unanimous) | 1 | 2:00 |
Wins KAMINARIMON All Japan Junior -35kg title.
| 2016-12-11 | Win | (Japan) Yuichiro Watanabe | KAMINARIMON All Japan Tournament, Semi Final | Tokyo, Japan | Decision (unanimous) | 1 | 2:00 |
| 2016-12-11 | Win | (Japan) Kaoru Hokkoku | KAMINARIMON All Japan Tournament, Quarter Final | Tokyo, Japan | Decision (unanimous) | 1 | 2:00 |
| 2016-10-09 | Win | (Japan) Ryujin Nasukawa | KAMINARIMON | Tokyo, Japan | Decision (unanimous) | 2 | 2:00 |
| 2016-04-17 | Win | (Japan) Haruto Nagamichi | KAMINARIMON | Tokyo, Japan | Decision (unanimous) | 2 | 2:00 |
| 2016-02-28 | Loss | (Japan) Ryoga Terayama | KAMINARIMON | Tokyo, Japan | Decision (unanimous) | 2 | 2:00 |
| 2015-12-13 | Win | (Japan) Nobunari Ishimoto | KAMINARIMON | Tokyo, Japan | Decision (unanimous) | 2 | 2:00 |
| 2015-09-20 | Loss | (Japan) Ryu Hanaoka | KAMINARIMON All Japan Tournament, Quarter Finals | Tokyo, Japan | Decision (unanimous) | 1 | 2:00 |
Legend: Win Loss Draw/No contest Notes
