= Rui Okubo =

Japanese kickboxer

- Born: 大久保 琉唯; September 12, 2004 (age 22); Utsunomiya, Japan
- Height: 175 cm (5 ft 9 in)
- Weight: 55 kg (121 lb; 8.7 st)
- Stance: Orthodox
- Fighting out of: Utsunomiya, Japan
- Team: K-1 GYM WOLF TEAM ASTER
- Years active: 2022–present

Kickboxing record
- Total: 17
- Wins: 14
- By knockout: 4
- Losses: 2
- By knockout: 1
- Draws: 0
- No contests: 1

Other information
- Notable relatives: Seri Okubo (brother)

Rui Okubo (Japanese: 大久保 琉唯, Okubo Rui; born September 12, 2004) is a Japanese kickboxer. He is the former Krush Flyweight (-51kg) champion and the 2024 K-1 Super bantamweight (-55 kg) World Tournament runner-up.

As of April 2024 he was the 10th ranked strawweight (-54 kg) kickboxer in the world by Combat Press.

== Biography and career ==
=== Krush ===
As an amateur Okubo amassed a record of 145 wins, 18 losses, 3 draws and captured over 40 titles. During 2021, his last year of competition before turning professional, Okubo won the two most prestigious titles of Japanese amateur kickboxing, the Japan Cup in March and the K-1 Koshien tournament in August. He won four fights in one day during both tournaments. His Koshien success secured him a professional debut with the K-1 promotion. He was awarded the Best Amateur Athlete Award at the 2021 K-1 Awards Show.

Okubo made his professional debut on February 27, 2022, at K-1 World GP 2022 Japan against Shohei Nishibayashi. He won the fight by unanimous decision.

For his second professional fight, Okubo was invited on the exceptional card THE MATCH 2022 at the Tokyo Dome, on June 19, 2022, where he faced Ryujin Nasukawa, the younger brother of the card headlining star Tenshin Nasukawa. Okubo won the fight by unanimous decision.

==== Krush Flyweight champion ====
On September 24, 2022, Okubo took part in a 4-man tournament at Krush 141 with the inaugural Krush Flyweight (-51kg) title at stake. In the semifinals he rematched Shohei Nishibayashi and defeated him once again by unanimous decision. Okubo advanced to the final where he faced Daina. The fight was declared a draw after 3 rounds and went to an extension round which Okubo won by split decision to capture the inaugural title.

Okubo vacated his Krush flyweight title on April 14, 2023, in order to move up in weight. Okubo made his debut at 53 kg on June 3, 2023, at K-1 World GP 2023 in Yokohama against Ryunosuke Saito. He lost the fight by extension round decision.

On October 21, 2023, Okubo returned to krush to face Eito Kurokawa at Krush 154. He won the fight by unanimous decision.

=== K-1 ===
Rui Okubo faced Kazuki Miburo at K-1 World MAX 2024 - World Tournament Opening Round on March 20, 2024. He won the fight by unanimous decision.

Okubo was announced as being part of an 8-man world tournament in the 55 kg division that would see its first round take place on July 7, 2024, at K-1 World MAX 2024 - World Championship Tournament Final. Okubo faced Zhao Zhengdong in the tournament quarterfinals at K-1 World MAX 2024 on July 7, 2024. He won the fight by unanimous decision, with two scorecards of 30–29 and one scorecard of 30–28 in his favor. Okubo faced the two-time K-1 super bantamweight title challenger Masashi Kumura in the final four of the tournament, which was held at K-1 World MAX 2024 on September 29, 2024. He won the fight by unanimous decision, with all three judges awarding him a 30–29 scorecard. Okubo faced the reigning K-1 super bantamweight champion Akihiro Kaneko in the tournament finals. He lost the fight by a second-round knockout.

Okubo faced the reigning Krush Super Bantamweight (-55kg) champion Riamu Sera in a non-title bout at K-1 World Grand Prix 2024 Final on December 14, 2025. He won the fight by unanimous decision, with three scorecards of 30—29 in his favor.

Okubo moved up in weight in order to face Koshiro Takemi in a -58 kg catchweight bout at K-1 World MAX 2025 on February 9, 2025. He won the fight by a third-round knockout, the first stoppage victory of his career.

Okuba faced Shion in a -56 kg catchweight bout at K-1 Dontaku on July 13, 2025. He won the fight by a first-round technical knockout.

Okubo faced Wu Yutong at K-1 World MAX 2025 - 70kg World Championship Tournament Final on November 15, 2025. He won the fight by a first-round knockout.

Okubo challenged the K-1 Super Bantamweight champion Akihiro Kaneko at K-1 World GP 2026 -90kg World Tournament on February 8, 2026. Ahead of the bout, Okubo encountered significant difficulties during his weight cut. At the official weigh-in, he exceeded the contracted limit by 1.3 kg, resulting in the fight being reclassified as a non-title contest. He was also subject to a two-point deduction at the opening of the match, required to use 10 oz gloves in place of the standard 8 oz gloves, and forfeited 30% of his purse to Kaneko. Okubo later stated that he had been experiencing health problems earlier in the month and was hospitalized on February 6 after suffering hearing loss and numbness in his hands and feet. His condition worsened during the final stages of weight reduction, culminating in a loss of consciousness and emergency transport to hospital. Despite receiving treatment and appearing at the weigh-in, he was unable to meet the required weight. Despite holding a clear edge, two judges scored the bout 28–28, resulting in a draw and triggering an extension round. Although Okubo later emerged ahead on the scorecards, his failure to make weight led officials to rule the contest a no-contest.

== Titles and accomplishments ==
=== Professional ===
- Krush
  - 2022 Krush Flyweight (-51kg) Champion
- K-1
  - 2024 K-1 Super Bantamweight (-55kg) World Tournament Runner-up
  - 2026 K-1 Featherweight (-57.5kg) Champion

Awards

- 2021 K-1 Awards Best Amateur Athlete
- 2022 K-1 Awards Rookie of the Year

=== Amateur ===
- 2015 WBC Muay Thai All Japan Jr League -28 kg Champion
- 2015 WPMF Japan -30g Champion
- 2016 SMASHERS -30 kg Champion
- 2016 REBELS Blow Cup Tournament -30 kg Champion
- 2016 Battle of MuayThai -30 kg Tournament Winner
- 2016 NJKF Explosion U-12 -31 kg Champion
- 2016 Suk Wan Kingthong Real Champion Tournament -30 kg Winner
- 2016 WPMF Japan -35 kg Champion
- 2017 Windy Super Fight Kick -33 kg Champion
- 2017 NJKF Explosion U-12 -34 kg Champion
- 2017 MuayThaiOpen -35 kg Champion
- 2017 SMASHERS -35 kg Champion
- 2017 NJKF Explosion U-15 -34 kg Champion
- 2017 Suk Wan Kingthong Real Champion -34 kg Tournament Winner
- 2017 WBC Muay Thai All Japan Jr League -34 kg Champion
- 2017 Shootboxing All Japan -35 kg
- 2017 WPMF Japan -40 kg Champion
- 2018 Windy Super Fight Kick -36 kg Champion
- 2018 Bigbang -37 kg Champion
- 2018 SMASHERS -40 kg Champion
- 2018 MuayThaiOpen -40 kg Champion
- 2018 WBC Muay Thai All Japan Jr League -37 kg Champion
- 2018 TENKAICHI -40 kg Champion
- 2018 National Junior Kickboxing Champion
- 2018 NJKF Explosion U-15 -40 kg Champion
- 2019 TENKAICHI -45 kg Champion
- 2019 NJKF Explosion U-15 -45 kg Champion
- 2019 Bigbang -45 kg Champion
- 2019 MuayThaiOpen -45 kg Champion & Event MVP
- 2019 WBC Muay Thai All Japan Jr League -45 kg Champion
- 2020 K-1 Challenge B-class Tournament -55 kg Winner & Event MVP
- 2021 Amateur Dageki Kakutougi Japan Cup -55 kg Winner
- 2021 K-1 All Japan B-class -55 kg Champion & B-class MVP
- 2021 K-1 Koshien East Japan Tournament -55 kg Winner
- 2021 K-1 Koshien Tournament -55 kg Winner
- 2021 K-1 All Japan A-class -55 kg Champion & A-class Event MVP
- 2021 K-1 Awards Amateur Fighter of the Year

== Fight record ==
Professional Kickboxing record
14 Wins (4 (T)KO's), 2 Losses, 0 Draw, 1 No Contest
| Date | Result | Opponent | Event | Location | Method | Round | Time |
| 2026-12-29 | | (Uzbekistan) Bobirjon Isroilov | K-1 World MAX 2026 - World Championship Tournament Final | Yokohama, Japan | | | |
| 2026-09-12 | Win | (Japan) Ryota Ishida | K-1 World MAX 2026 - World Tournament Opening Round | Tokyo, Japan | KO (Left hook) | 3 | 1:25 |
Wins the K-1 Featherweight Championship.
| 2026-04-11 | Win | (Japan) Takahito Niimi | K-1 Genki 2026 | Tokyo, Japan | Decision (Majority) | 3 | 3:00 |
| 2026-02-08 | NC | (Japan) Akihiro Kaneko | K-1 World GP 2026 - 90kg World Tournament | Tokyo, Japan | | 4 | 3:00 |
Okubo misssed weight by 1.3kg. Per K-1 rules his win by extension round decision became a no contest.
| 2025-11-15 | Win | (China) Wu Yutong | K-1 World MAX 2025 - 70kg World Championship Tournament Final | Tokyo, Japan | KO (Body kick) | 1 | 1:41 |
| 2025-07-13 | Win | (Japan) Shion | K-1 Dontaku | Fukuoka, Japan | TKO (Punches) | 1 | 2:39 |
| 2025-02-09 | Win | (Japan) Koshiro Takemi | K-1 World MAX 2025 | Tokyo, Japan | KO (Body kick) | 3 | 1:31 |
| 2024-12-14 | Win | (Japan) Riamu | K-1 World Grand Prix 2024 Final | Tokyo, Japan | Decision (Unanimous) | 3 | 3:00 |
| 2024-09-29 | Loss | (Japan) Akihiro Kaneko | K-1 World MAX 2024 - 55 kg World Tournament, Final | Tokyo, Japan | KO (Low kick) | 2 | 0:26 |
For the 2024 K-1 Super Bantamweight (-55kg) World Tournament title.
| 2024-09-29 | Win | (Japan) Masashi Kumura | K-1 World MAX 2024 - 55 kg World Tournament, Semifinals | Tokyo, Japan | Decision (Unanimous) | 3 | 3:00 |
| 2024-07-07 | Win | (China) Zhao Zhengdong | K-1 World MAX 2024 - 55 kg World Tournament, Quarterfinals | Tokyo, Japan | Decision (Unanimous) | 3 | 3:00 |
| 2024-03-20 | Win | (Japan) Kazuki Miburo | K-1 World MAX 2024 - World Tournament Opening Round | Tokyo, Japan | Decision (Unanimous) | 3 | 3:00 |
| 2023-10-21 | Win | (Japan) Eito Kurokawa | Krush 154 | Tokyo, Japan | Decision (Unanimous) | 3 | 3:00 |
| 2023-06-03 | Loss | (Japan) Ryunosuke Saito | K-1 World GP 2023 in Yokohama | Yokohama, Japan | Ext.R Decision (Split) | 4 | 3:00 |
| 2022-09-24 | Win | (Japan) Daina | Krush 141 - Flyweight Championship Tournament Final | Tokyo, Japan | Ext.R Decision (Split) | 4 | 3:00 |
Wins the inaugural Krush Flyweight (-51.5kg) title.
| 2022-09-24 | Win | (Japan) Shohei Nishibayashi | Krush 141 - Flyweight Championship Tournament Semi Final | Tokyo, Japan | Decision (Unanimous) | 3 | 3:00 |
| 2022-06-19 | Win | (Japan) Ryujin Nasukawa | THE MATCH 2022 | Tokyo, Japan | Decision (Unanimous) | 3 | 3:00 |
| 2022-02-27 | Win | (Japan) Shohei Nishibayashi | K-1 World GP 2022 Japan | Tokyo, Japan | Decision (unanimous) | 3 | 3:00 |
Legend: Win Loss Draw/No contest Notes

=== Amateur record ===
Amateur Kickboxing record
145 Wins (30 (T)KO's), 18 Losses, 3 Draws
| Date | Result | Opponent | Event | Location | Method | Round | Time |
| 2021-09-12 | Win | (Japan) Gentaro Iwamoto | K-1 Amateur All Japan, A-class -55 kg, Final | Tokyo, Japan | Decision (Unanimous) | 1 | 2:00 |
Wins K-1 All Japan A-class -55kg title.
| 2021-09-12 | Win | (Japan) Haruto Matsumoto | K-1 Amateur All Japan, A-class -55 kg, Semi Final | Tokyo, Japan | Decision (Unanimous) | 1 | 2:00 |
| 2021-08-29 | Win | (Japan) Ryunosuke Saito | 2021 K-1 Koshien Tournament -55 kg, Final | Tokyo, Japan | Decision (Majority) | 1 | 3:00 |
Wins 2021 K-1 Koshien -55kg Tournament title.
| 2021-08-29 | Win | (Japan) Ryuki Yasuo | 2021 K-1 Koshien Tournament -55 kg, Semi Finals | Tokyo, Japan | Decision (Unanimous) | 1 | 2:00 |
| 2021-08-29 | Win | (Japan) Takumi Yoshimura | 2021 K-1 Koshien Tournament -55 kg, Quarter Finals | Tokyo, Japan | Decision (Unanimous) | 1 | 2:00 |
| 2021-08-29 | Win | (Japan) Yuto Kobayashi | 2021 K-1 Koshien Tournament -55 kg, 1/8 Final | Tokyo, Japan | KO | 1 | |
| 2021-07-11 | Win | (Japan) Ryunosuke Saito | K-1 Koshien 2021 East Japan Tournament -55 kg, Final | Tokyo, Japan | Decision (Split) | 1 | 2:00 |
Qualifies for the 2021 K-1 Koshien -55kg Tournament.
| 2021-07-11 | Win | (Japan) Riku Otsu | K-1 Koshien 2021 East Japan Tournament -55 kg, Semi Final | Tokyo, Japan | Decision (Unanimous) | 1 | 2:00 |
| 2021-07-11 | Win | (Japan) Eito Kurokawa | K-1 Koshien 2021 East Japan Tournament -55 kg, Quarter Final | Tokyo, Japan | Decision (Unanimous) | 1 | 2:00 |
| 2021-07-11 | Win | (Japan) Mikito Jouchi | K-1 Koshien 2021 East Japan Tournament -55 kg, 1/8 Final | Tokyo, Japan | Decision (Unanimous) | 1 | 2:00 |
| 2021-05-16 | Win | (Japan) Gentaro Iwamoto | K-1 Amateur All Japan Selection, A-class -55 kg, Final | Tokyo, Japan | Decision (Unanimous) | 1 | 2:00 |
| 2021-05-16 | Win | (Japan) Takeru Itabashi | K-1 Amateur All Japan Selection, A-class -55 kg, Semi Final | Tokyo, Japan | Decision (Unanimous) | 1 | 2:00 |
| 2021-04-11 | Win | (Japan) Ryuki Yasuo | 10th All Japan K-1 Amateur, B-class -55 kg Tournament, Final | Tokyo, Japan | Decision (Unanimous) | 1 | 2:00 |
Wins K-1 Amateur All Japan B-class -55kg title.
| 2021-04-11 | Win | (Japan) Tadashi Nakamura | 10th All Japan K-1 Amateur, B-class -55 kg Tournament, Semi Final | Tokyo, Japan | KO (High Kick) | 1 | |
| 2021-03-20 | Win | (Japan) Tenshi Matsumoto | Dageki Kakutougi Japan Cup 2021, Final | Tokyo, Japan | Decision (Unanimous) | 2 | 2:00 |
Wins 2021 Japan Cup -55kg title.
| 2021-03-20 | Win | (Japan) Shuri Sakayori | Dageki Kakutougi Japan Cup 2021, Semi Final | Tokyo, Japan | Ext.R Decision (Unanimous) | 2 | 2:00 |
| 2021-03-20 | Win | (Japan) Toki Oshika | Dageki Kakutougi Japan Cup 2021, Quarter Final | Tokyo, Japan | Decision (Unanimous) | 1 | 3:00 |
| 2021-03-20 | Win | (Japan) Hyo Tsutsumi | Dageki Kakutougi Japan Cup 2021, First Round | Tokyo, Japan | Decision (Uannimous | 1 | 3:00 |
| 2021-02-21 | Win | (Japan) Toki Oshika | SMASHERS 2021 | Tokyo, Japan | Decision (Unanimous) | 2 | 2:00 |
| 2020-11-08 | Win | (Japan) Yuta Shinbo | K-1 Amateur Challenge 34, B-class Tournament -55 kg Final | Tokyo, Japan | Decision | 1 | 2:00 |
| 2020-11-08 | Win | (Japan) Shura Shigihara | K-1 Amateur Challenge 34, B-class Tournament -55 kg Semi Final | Tokyo, Japan | Decision | 1 | 2:00 |
| 2020-11-08 | Win | (Japan) Rairo Shiratori | K-1 Amateur Challenge 34, B-class Tournament -55 kg Quarter Final | Tokyo, Japan | TKO | 1 | |
| 2019-08-24 | Win | (Japan) Gento Shimoji | 5th All Japan WBC Muay Thai Jr League, Final | Tokyo, Japan | Decision | | |
Wins All Japan WBC Muay Thai Jr League -45kg title.
| 2019-08-24 | Win | (Japan) Hiroto Hayashi | 5th All Japan WBC Muay Thai Jr League, Semi Final | Tokyo, Japan | Decision | | |
| 2019-08-24 | Win | (Japan) Taison Maeda | 5th All Japan WBC Muay Thai Jr League, Quarter Final | Tokyo, Japan | Decision | | |
| 2019-07-28 | Win | (Japan) Ryushin Yasuno | MuayThaiOpen 45 | Tokyo, Japan | TKO | | |
Wins MuayThaiOpen Amateur -45kg title.
| 2019-07-21 | Win | (Japan) Toki Oshika | NJKF Explosion 22, WBC Muay Thai Jr league Selection Final | Tokyo, Japan | Decision | 2 | 1:30 |
| 2019-07-21 | Win | (Japan) Taison Maeda | NJKF Explosion 22, WBC Muay Thai Jr league Selection Semi Final | Tokyo, Japan | Decision | 2 | 1:30 |
| 2019-07-14 | Win | (Japan) Aiki Oshika | Bigbang Amateur 51 | Tokyo, Japan | Decision | 3 | 1:30 |
Wins Bigbang -45kg title.
| 2019-06-16 | Win | (Japan) Kokoro Wakahara | WPMF Amateur 108 | Tokyo, Japan | KO | 1 | |
| 2019-04-28 | Win | (Japan) Daiki Nakano | National Junior Kickboxing 16 | Tokyo, Japan | KO | 1 | |
| 2019-04-28 | Win | (Japan) | National Junior Kickboxing 16 | Tokyo, Japan | | | |
| 2019-03-31 | Win | (Japan) Kokoro Wakahara | SMASHERS 199 | Japan | KO | 2 | 1:02 |
| 2019-03-24 | Win | (Japan) Eito Sanpei | TENKAICHI Amateur vol.4 | Tokyo, Japan | KO | 1 | 1:02 |
Defends TENKAICHI -45kg title.
| 2019-03-10 | Win | (Japan) | NJKF Explosion 20 | Tokyo, Japan | Forfeit | | |
Wins NJKF Explosion U-15 -45kg title.
| 2019-02-24 | Loss | (Japan) Sora Sugiyama | MuayThaiOpen 42 | Tokyo, Japan | Decision | | |
For the MuayThaiOpen Amateur -45kg title.
| 2019-02-10 | Win | (Japan) Tesshin Takeda | WPMF Amateur 106 | Tokyo, Japan | Decision | | |
| 2019-01-20 | Win | (Japan) Takuto Kobayashi | NJKF Explosion 19 | Tokyo, Japan | Decision | 2 | 1:30 |
| 2018-12-09 | Win | (Japan) Kosei Tanaka | NJKF Explosion 18 | Tokyo, Japan | KO | 1 | |
| 2018-10-20 | Draw | (Japan) Hiroto Hayashi | KROSS×OVER 4 | Tokyo, Japan | Decision | 2 | 2:00 |
| 2018-10-14 | Win | (Japan) Riamu Matsumoto | NJKF Explosion 17 | Atsugi, Japan | Decision | 3 | 1:30 |
Wins NJKF Explosion U-15 -40kg title.
| 2018-08-05 | Win | (Japan) Riamu Matsumoto | 4th All Japan WBC Muay Thai Jr League, Final | Tokyo, Japan | Decision | | |
Wins All Japan WBC Muay Thai Jr League -37kg title.
| 2018-08-05 | Win | (Japan) Sento Ito | 4th All Japan WBC Muay Thai Jr League, Semi Final | Tokyo, Japan | Decision | | |
| 2018-07-22 | Win | (Japan) Ryoma Nagai | MuayThaiOpen 42 | Tokyo, Japan | TKO | | |
Wins MuayThaiOpen Amateur -40kg title.
| 2018-07-08 | Win | (Japan) Riamu Matsumoto | NJKF Explosion 16, WBC Muay Thai Jr league Selection Final | Matsudo, Japan | Decision | 2 | 1:30 |
| 2018-07-08 | Win | (Japan) Raisei Hakkaku | NJKF Explosion 16, WBC Muay Thai Jr league Selection Semi Final | Matsudo, Japan | Decision | 2 | 1:30 |
| 2018-07-08 | Win | (Japan) Yuto Nagasu | NJKF Explosion 16, WBC Muay Thai Jr league Selection Quarter Final | Matsudo, Japan | Decision | 2 | 1:30 |
| 2018-06-03 | Loss | (Japan) Shimon Yoshinari | WPMF Amateur 101 | Tokyo, Japan | Decision | | |
Loses WPMF M-ONE -40kg title.
| 2018-05-13 | Win | (Japan) Hajime Yoshida | SMASHERS 194 | Tokyo, Japan | Decision (Unanimous) | 3 | 1:30 |
Wins SMASHERS -40kg title.
| 2018-04-15 | Win | (Japan) Sho Osano | NJKF Explosion 15 | Atsugi, Japan | Decision | 2 | 1:30 |
| 2018-04-08 | Win | (Japan) Aiki Oshika | Bigbang Amateur 45 | Tokyo, Japan | Decision | 2 | 1:30 |
Wins Bigabng -37kg title.
| 2018-04-01 | Win | (Japan) Atsuki Bravely Gym | WPMF Amateur 100 | Tokyo, Japan | Decision | | |
Wins WPMF Amateur -40kg title.
| 2018-03-25 | Loss | (Japan) Taison Maeda | SMASHERS 193 | Tokyo, Japan | Decision (Unanimous) | 2 | 1:30 |
| 2018-03-11 | Win | (Japan) Sho Osano | Shootboxing Amateur 20 | Tokyo, Japan | Decision | 2 | 1:30 |
| 2018-03-04 | Win | (Japan) Aiki Oshika | Windy Super Fight 8, Final | Tokyo, Japan | Decision (Unanimous) | 3 | 2:00 |
Wins Windy Super Fight Kick -36kg title.
| 2018-03-04 | Win | (Japan) Ryusei Hori | Windy Super Fight 8, Semi Final | Tokyo, Japan | Decision (Majority) | 2 | 1:30 |
| 2018-02-11 | Loss | (Japan) Shimon Yoshinari | Muay Thai Super Fight Suk Wan Kingtong vol.10 | Tokyo, Japan | Decision | 2 | 2:00 |
| 2018-02-04 | Win | (Japan) Riamu Matsumoto | NJKF Explosion 14 | Tokyo, Japan | Decision | 2 | 1:30 |
| 2018-01-21 | Win | (Japan) Toki Oshika | SMASHERS 192 | Tokyo, Japan | Decision (Unanimous) | 2 | 1:30 |
| 2018-01-23 | Win | (Japan) Riamu Matsumoto | SMASHERS 192 | Tokyo, Japan | Decision (Unanimous) | 2 | 1:30 |
| 2017-12-17 | Win | (Japan) Daiki Kobayashi | Shootboxing Amateur All Japan Championship | Tokyo, Japan | Decision | 2 | 2:00 |
Wins Shootboxing All Japan -45kg title.
| 2017-11-25 | Win | (Japan) Shimon Yoshinari | WPMF Amateur 98 | Tokyo, Japan | Decision | | |
Wins WPMF -40kg title.
| 2017-09-24 | Draw | (Japan) Takuma Urata | SMASHERS 189 | Tokyo, Japan | Decision | 2 | 1:30 |
| 2017-09-18 | Win | (Japan) Kouken | WPMF Amateur 96 | Tokyo, Japan | KO | 2 | |
| 2017-08-07 | Win | (Japan) Riamu Matsumoto | 3rd All Japan WBC Muay Thai Jr League Tournament, Final | Tokyo, Japan | Decision | | |
Wins All Japan WBC Muay Thai Jr League -34kg title.
| 2017-08-07 | Win | (Japan) Teru Sugiura | 3rd All Japan WBC Muay Thai Jr League Tournament, Semi Final | Tokyo, Japan | Decision | | |
| 2017-07-16 | Win | (Japan) Ryoma Nagai | Suk Wan Kingthong Real Champion Tournament, Final | Tokyo, Japan | KO | 2 | |
Wins Real Champion Tournament -34kg title.
| 2017-07-09 | Win | (Japan) Seiya Sekiguchi | MuayThaiOpen 39 | Tokyo, Japan | Decision | | |
Defends MuayThaiOpen Amateur -35kg title.
| 2017-07-02 | Win | (Japan) Riamu Matsumoto | NJKF Explosion 11 | Japan | Decision | 3 | 1:30 |
Wins NJKF Explosion U-15 -34kg title.
| 2017-06-28 | Win | (Japan) Akito Kinoshita | SMASHERS 188, Final | Tokyo, Japan | Decision (Unanimous) | 2 | 1:30 |
| 2017-06-28 | Win | (Japan) Seiya Sekiguchi | SMASHERS 188, Semi Final | Tokyo, Japan | Decision (Unanimous) | 2 | 1:30 |
| 2017-06-18 | Loss | (Japan) Shimon Yoshinari | WPMF Amateur 94 | Tokyo, Japan | Decision | | |
Loses WPMF -35kg title.
| 2017-05-28 | Win | (Japan) Hinata Tanabe | SMASHERS 187 | Tokyo, Japan | KO | 2 | 0:30 |
Wins SMASHERS -35kg title.
| 2017-04-16 | Win | (Japan) Ryushin Yasuno | NJKF Explosion 10 | Japan | Decision | 2 | 1:30 |
| 2017-04-02 | Win | (Japan) Ryusei Shimizu | MuayThaiOpen 38 | Tokyo, Japan | TKO | | |
Wins MuayThaiOpen Amateur -35kg title.
| 2017-03-20 | Win | (Japan) Daiya Oshikawa | WPMF Amateur 92 | Tokyo, Japan | Decision | | |
Defends WPMF -35kg title.
| 2017-02-12 | Win | (Japan) Aiji Kobayashi | NJKF Explosion 8, Championship Tournament Final | Tokyo, Japan | Decision | 2 | 1:30 |
Wins NJKF Explosion -34kg title.
| 2017-02-12 | Win | (Japan) Riamu Matsumoto | NJKF Explosion 8, Championship Tournament Semi Final | Tokyo, Japan | Decision | 2 | 1:30 |
| 2017-02-12 | Win | (Japan) Arashi Sakamoto | NJKF Explosion 8, Championship Tournament Quarter Final | Tokyo, Japan | | | |
| 2017-01-22 | Win | (Japan) Takumu Ishiwata | Windy Super Fight 5 | Tokyo, Japan | Decision (Unanimous) | 3 | 2:00 |
Wins Windy Super Fight Kick -33kg title.
| 2016-12-18 | Win | (Japan) Sora Echizen | WPMF Amateur 90 | Tokyo, Japan | Decision | | |
Wins WPMF -35kg title.
| 2016-11-23 | Win | (Japan) Sora Echizen | WPMF Amateur 89, Next Challenger Tournament Final | Tokyo, Japan | | | |
| 2016-11-23 | Win | (Japan) Shota Kunioka | WPMF Amateur 89, Next Challenger Tournament Semi Final | Tokyo, Japan | | | |
| 2016-10-30 | Loss | (Japan) Yosuke Uchida | Windy Super Fight 4 | Tokyo, Japan | Ext.R Decision (Split) | 4 | 2:00 |
For the Windy Super Fight Kick -33kg title.
| 2016-10-09 | Win | (Japan) Takumu Ishiwata | Suk Wan Kinghtong Amateur, Real Champion Tournament Final | Tokyo, Japan | Decision (Unanimous) | | |
Wins Real Champion Tournament -30kg title.
| 2016-10-09 | Win | (Japan) Sora Sugiyama | Suk Wan Kinghtong Amateur, Real Champion Tournament Semi Final | Tokyo, Japan | | | |
| 2016-10-09 | Win | (Japan) Koushi Soga | Suk Wan Kinghtong Amateur, Real Champion Tournament Quarter Final | Tokyo, Japan | | | |
| 2016-09-04 | Win | (Japan) Hinata Tanabe | SMASHERS 183 | Japan | KO | 1 | 1:12 |
Defends SMASHERS -30kg title.
| 2016-07-23 | Loss | (Japan) Shimon Yoshinari | 2nd All Japan WBC Muay Thai Jr League Tournament, Final | Tokyo, Japan | Ext.R Decision | 3 | |
For the All Japan WBC Muay Thai Jr League -31kg title.
| 2016-07-23 | Win | (Japan) Ryuta Suekuni | 2nd All Japan WBC Muay Thai Jr League Tournament, Semi Final | Tokyo, Japan | Decision | | |
| 2016-06-19 | Win | (Japan) Ryoma Nagai | WPMF Amateur | Tokyo, Japan | KO | | |
Defends WPMF -30kg title.
| 2016-06-05 | Win | (Japan) Takumu Ishiwata | BOM Amateur 15, Final | Yokohama, Japan | Decision | 2 | 2:00 |
| 2016-06-05 | Win | (Japan) Sena Ohno | BOM Amateur 15, Semi Final | Yokohama, Japan | Decision | 2 | 2:00 |
| 2016-05-15 | Win | (Japan) Aiji Kobayashi | NJKF Explosion 5 | Tokyo, Japan | Decision | 2 | 1:30 |
Wins NJKF Explosion -31kg title.
| 2016-04-29 | Win | (Japan) Shoki Hoshikubo | SMASHERS 179 | Tokyo, Japan | Decision (Unanimous) | 3 | 1:30 |
Defends SMASHERS -30kg title.
| 2016-04-03 | Win | (Japan) Kona Aiharai | Amateur REBELS - Blow Cup Tournament -30 kg, Final | Tokyo, Japan | Forfeit | | |
Wins REBELS BLOW CUP -30kg title.
| 2016-04-03 | Win | (Japan) Seiya Sekiguchi | Amateur REBELS - Blow Cup Tournament -30 kg, Semi Final | Tokyo, Japan | Decision (Unanimous) | | |
| 2016-04-03 | Win | (Japan) Sara Kadowaki | Amateur REBELS - Blow Cup Tournament -30 kg, Quarter Final | Tokyo, Japan | Decision (Unanimous) | | |
| 2016-03-21 | Win | (Japan) | WPMF Amateur | Tokyo, Japan | | | |
Wins WPMF -30kg title.
| 2016-03-20 | Win | (Japan) Sara Kadowaki | SMASHERS 178 | Tokyo, Japan | Decision (Majority) | 2 | 1:30 |
Wins SMASHERS -30kg title.
| 2016-03-13 | Win | (Japan) Taiju Nozaki | Muay Lok | Tokyo, Japan | Decision | 2 | 2:00 |
| 2016-02-14 | Win | (Japan) | WMPF Amateur 83, Final | Tokyo, Japan | | | |
| 2016-02-14 | Win | (Japan) Sora Sugiyama | WMPF Amateur 83, Semi Final | Tokyo, Japan | | | |
| 2016-02-07 | Win | (Japan) Takuma Urata | NJKF Explosion 4 | Japan | Decision | 3 | 1:30 |
| 2015-12-12 | Loss | (Japan) Shimon Yoshinari | JAKF "SMASHERS Champion's Carnival 2015" | Tokyo, Japan | Decision (Unanimous) | 2 | 1:30 |
For the SMASHERS -30kg title.
| 2015-12-06 | Win | (Japan) Daiki Nakano | Kokusai Junior Kickboxing Championship 8 | Saitama, Japan | Decision | | |
| 2015-08-30 | Win | (Japan) Momu Tsukamoto | All Japan WBC Muay Thai Jr League, Final | Tokyo, Japan | Decision | | |
Wins All Japan WBC Muay Thai Jr League Elementary School -28kg title.
| 2015-07-05 | Win | (Japan) Ryugo Hori | NJKF Explosion | Tokyo, Japan | Decision | 2 | 1:30 |
| 2015-04-19 | Loss | (Japan) Ryu Hanaoka | SMASHERS Wings | Tokyo, Japan | Decision (Unanimous) | | |
Legend: Win Loss Draw/No contest Notes
