= Zhao Zhengdong =

Chinese kickboxer

- Born: February 19, 2005 (age 21); Beihai, Guangxi, China
- Height: 176 cm (5 ft 9 in)
- Weight: 57 kg (126 lb; 9.0 st)
- Style: Kickboxing, Muay Thai, Sanda
- Stance: Orthodox
- Fighting out of: Shenzhen, China
- Team: Shenzhen Shengli Renhe Fight Academy/CFP
- Trainer: Liu Jiapan

Kickboxing record
- Total: 35
- Wins: 29
- By knockout: 11
- Losses: 6

Zhao Zhengdong (Chinese: 赵正东, born February 19, 2005) is a Chinese kickboxer.

As of July 2026 he was the 7th ranked -58 kg kickboxer in the world by Beyond Kickboxing.

== Career ==
=== Early career ===
On May 20, 2023, Zhao faced Shang Shuainan at Beijing Fighting. He won the fight by unanimous decision.

On September 15, 2023, Zhao faced Zhang Shuyang at TOP Fighting World Championship. He won the fight by unanimous decision.

On October 5, 2023, Zhao defeated Yang Wonghao by unanimous decision at China Kickboxing League.

Zhao took part in an 8-man world tournament in the 55 kg division that would see its first round take place on July 7, 2024, at K-1 World MAX 2024 - World Championship Tournament Final. Zhao faced Rui Okubo in the tournament quarterfinals. He lost the fight by unanimous decision.

On October 26, 2024, Zhao faced Suphaphon at EWD Championship 2024. He won the fight by first round knockout.

On June 1, 2025, Zhao faced Shahril Aiman at the God of War event in Shenzhen, China. He won the fight via first round knockout.

On November 2, 2025, Zhao travelled to Japan to face Masayoshi Kunimoto at S-Battle 2025 for the vacant ISKA Kickboxing Intercontinental Bantamweight title. He won the fight by split decision.

=== ONE Championship ===
Zhao made his ONE Championship debut on January 23, 2026, at ONE Friday Fights 139 against Keisuke Monguchi. He won the fight by third round technical knockout.

On March 26, 2026, Zhao faced Yonis Anane at ONE Friday Fights 147. He won the fight by unanimous decision in a bout where fighters traded knockdowns.

Zhao faced Eduard Markarian on July 24, 2026, at ONE Friday Fights 163. He won the fight by unanimous decision.

== Titles and accomplishments ==
=== Professional ===
- International Sport Kickboxing Association
  - 2025 ISKA Kickboxing Intercontinental Bantamweight (55 kg) Champion

=== Amateur ===
- Sichuan Provincial Youth Kickboxing Champion
- Guangxi Youth Sanda Champion
- 2022 Guizhou Taijiang Kickboxing Invitational Tournament Winner
- 2023 National Muay Thai Champion

== Fight record ==
Professional Kickboxing and Muay Thai record
29 Wins (11 (T)KO's), 6 Losses, 0 Draw, 0 No Contest
Date	Result	Opponent	Event	Location	Method	Round	Time
2026-09-12	Loss	(Japan) Kosei Yoshida	ONE Samurai 3	Tokyo, Japan	Decision (Unanimous)	3	3:00
2026-07-24	Win	(Russia) Eduard Markarian	ONE Friday Fights 163, Lumpinee Stadium	Bangkok, Thailand	Decision (Unanimous)	3	3:00
2026-03-20	Win	(Thailand) Yonis Anane	ONE Friday Fights 147, Lumpinee Stadium	Bangkok, Thailand	Decision (Unanimous)	3	3:00
2026-01-23	Win	(Japan) Keisuke Monguchi	ONE Friday Fights 139, Lumpinee Stadium	Bangkok, Thailand	TKO (Punches)	3	1:21
2025-11-02	Win	(Japan) Masayoshi Kunimoto	S-Battle 2025 Fuyu no Jin	Okazaki, Aichi, Japan	Decision (Split)	5	3:00
Wins the vacant ISKA Kickboxing Intercontinental Bantamweight (55kg) title.
2025-09-20	Win	(Laos) Phetnamkhong Sor.Maneekot	LWC Super Fight, Lumpinee Stadium	Bangkok, Thailand	Decision (Unanimous)	3	3:00
2025-08-16	Win	(Thailand) Singsangpa Lookboonmee	Fairtex Fight, Lumpinee Stadium	Bangkok, Thailand	KO (Punches)	2	1:58
2025-06-28	Win	(Thailand) Petchchanon Lookboonmee	Fairtex Fight, Lumpinee Stadium	Bangkok, Thailand	KO (Punches)	2	1:47
2025-06-01	Win	(Malaysia) Shahril Aiman	God of War	Shenzhen, China	KO (Body punches)	1	
2025-04-19	Loss	(Iran) Mehrdad Khanzadeh	Fairtex Fight, Lumpinee Stadium	Bangkok, Thailand	KO (Left hook)	2	0:30
2025-02-15	Win	(Thailand) Numthai Petchnongkhee	Fairtex Fight, Lumpinee Stadium	Bangkok, Thailand	KO (Punches)	2	2:50
2024-12-11	Loss	(China) Wang Zhongxian	Wu Lin Feng Direct Digital Show 2 - 57 kg China Tournament, Semifinals	Zhengzhou, China	Decision (Unanimous)	3	3:00
2024-12-11	Win	(China) Wu Yutong	Wu Lin Feng Direct Digital Show 2 - 57 kg China Tournament, Quarterfinals	Zhengzhou, China	Decision (Unanimous)	3	3:00
2024-11-30	Win	(Morocco) Ilyas	Ocean Flower Island Championship Night	Danzhou, China	KO (Left hook)	1	2:09
2024-10-26	Win	(Thailand) Suphaphon	EWD Championship 2024	Shenzhen, China	KO (Punches)	1	2:12
2024-08-16	Loss	(China) Zhang Yong	Wu Lin Feng Direct Digital Show - 57 kg China Tournament, Semifinals	Zhengzhou, China	Decision	3	3:00
2024-08-16	Win	(China) Zhang Yuhao	Wu Lin Feng Direct Digital Show - 57 kg China Tournament, Quarterfinals	Zhengzhou, China	Decision	3	3:00
2024-07-07	Loss	(Japan) Rui Okubo	K-1 World MAX 2024 - 55 kg World Tournament, Quarterfinals	Tokyo, Japan	Decision (Unanimous)	3	3:00
2024-03-10	Win	(Cambodia) Sentry Kunkhmer	Wurkz Kun Khmer	Phnom Penh, Cambodia	KO (Punches)	2	2:20
2023-11-18	Win	(China) Cui Zhanling	TOP Fighting World Championship	China	Decision (Unanimous)	3	3:00
2023-10-22	Win	(China) Chen Zijin	TOP Fighting World Championship	Hefei, China	TKO	1	
2023-10-04	Win	(China) Yang Wonghao	China Kickboxing Premier League	China	Decision (Unanimous)	3	3:00
2023-09-15	Win	(China) Zhang Shuyang	TOP Fighting World Championship	Hefei, China	Decision (Unanimous)	3	3:00
2023-08-05	Win	(China) Wu Zhihui	China Kickboxing Premier League	Wuzhishan, China	Decision (Unanimous)	3	3:00
2023-05-20	Win	(China) Shang Shuainan	Beijing Fighting	Beijing, China	Decision (Unanimous)	3	3:00
2023-04-13	Win	(China) Liang Yang	LNK - Zhuang Yao Warriors Tournament	China	KO (High kick)	1	
2023-04-11	Win	(China) Zhou Jungui	LNK - Zhuang Yao Warriors Tournament	China	KO (Left hook to the body)	1	0:36
Legend: Win Loss Draw/No contest Notes
