= Shoa Arii =

Japanese kickboxer

- Born: 有井渚海; May 19, 2001 (age 25); Osaka, Japan
- Other names: Shivering Sugar Rush
- Height: 170 cm (5 ft 7 in)
- Weight: 55 kg (121 lb; 8.7 st)
- Style: Karate, kickboxing
- Stance: Orthodox
- Fighting out of: Osaka, Japan
- Team: Team Vasileus (2025–present); Oikawa Dojo (2019–2021); Arrows Gym (2022–2024)
- Years active: 2019–present

Kickboxing record
- Total: 19
- Wins: 14
- By knockout: 5
- Losses: 4
- By knockout: 1
- Draws: 1

Shoa Arii (Japanese: 有井渚海, Arii Shoa; born May 19, 2001) is a Japanese kickboxer, currently competing in the super bantamweight division of RISE.

As of August 2022 he was the #10 ranked strawweight kickboxer in the world by Combat Press.

== Kickboxing career ==
=== Shooto ===
Arii made his professional debut against Yuki Hamada at RISE WORLD SERIES 2019 Semi Final Round on July 21, 2019. He won the fight by unanimous decision. Arii next faced Lehe at ONE Warrior Series 8 on October 5, 2019. He won the fight by a third-round technical knockout, due to doctor stoppage. Arii faced the unbeaten Ryoga Terayama in his third and final fight of the year at Stand up vol.1 on December 22, 2019. The fight was ruled a unanimous decision draw, with scores of 29–29 across the board.

Arii faced Tatsuma Kinosada at Shooto 2020 Vol.4 in Osaka on July 12, 2020. He won the fight by unanimous decision. Arii made his second appearance at a Road To ONE event two months later, as he was booked to face Naoya Kuroda at ROAD to ONE 3rd: Tokyo Fight Night on October 9, 2020. He won the fight by a second-round knockout, stopping Kuroda with a well placed knee to the body.

Arii returned to RISE in order to face Ryoga Terayama at RISE Dead or Alive Osaka on November 1, 2020. He won the rematch by majority decision, with two scorecards of 30–29 and one scorecard of 29–29. Arii faced Yu Hiramatsu at ROAD to ONE 4th: Young Guns on February 22, 2021. He won the fight by a second-round knockout, as the referee opted to stop the bout following the third knockdown.

Arii participated in the 2021 Cage Kick Championship tournament, held at Shooto 2021 Vol.4 on July 4, 2021. He was able to beat Ryunosuke Omori and Takuro by unanimous decision, in the quarterfinals and semifinals respectively, but came up short against Ryoga Terayama in the finals. Although the pair fought to a draw after three rounds in their trilogy match, Terayama was awarded a split decision following the extra fourth round.

=== RISE ===
Arii made his third RISE appearance against Kyosuke at RISE WORLD SERIES 2021 Yokohama on September 23, 2021. He won the fight by unanimous decision. Two of the judges scored the fight 30–28 in his favor, while the third judge scored the fight 30–29 for him.

Arii faced Hyuga at RISE 162 on October 30, 2022, following a thirteen-month absence from the sport. He won the fight by unanimous decision, with all three judges awarding him every single round of the bout.

Arii faced Koyata Yamada at RISE WORLD SERIES / SHOOTBOXING-KINGS on December 25, 2022. He lost the fight by knockout, as he was floored with a counter right straight at the 1:21 minute mark of the second round.

Arii faced Yugo Kato RISE 174 at on December 10, 2023. He lost the fight by majority decision, with scores of 30–29, 29–28 and 29–29.

Arii was scheduled to face Musashi Matsushita at RISE EL DORADO 2024 on March 17, 2024. He withdrew from the bout due to injury. Arii was rescheduled to face Taisei Umei at RISE 187 on April 19, 2025. He lost the fight by unanimous decision.

Arii faced Ryunosuke Matsushita at RISE 196 on February 23, 2026.

== Titles and accomplishments ==
=== Professional ===
- Shooto
  - 2021 Shooto Cage Kick Championship -54 kg runner-up

=== Amateur ===
- Shin Karate
  - 2016 Dageki Kakutougi Japan Cup K-3 Champion
  - 2017 Shin Karate All Japan K-3 Grand Prix Champion
  - 2018 Shin Karate All Japan K-3 Grand Prix Champion
  - 2018 Dageki Kakutougi Japan Cup -58 kg Champion
  - 2019 Shin Karate All Japan K-2 Grand Prix Champion
- All Japan Glove Karate Federation
  - 2017 All Japan Glove Karate Federation Osaka -55 kg Champion
  - 2016 All Japan Glove Karate Federation Junior Highschool Lightweight Champion
  - 2017 All Japan Glove Karate Federation -55 kg Champion
- Green Boy Fight
  - 2016 Green Boy Fight Belt Tournament Welterweight Champion

== Fight record ==
Professional kickboxing record
14 wins (5 (T)KOs), 4 losses, 1 draw
Date	Result	Opponent	Event	Location	Method	Round	Time
2026-10-25	Win	(Japan) Knight Makino	GOAT Kickboxing Fes. 3	Tokyo, Japan	Decision (Unanimous)	3	3:00
2026-06-28	Win	(Japan) Kazuhiro Matsuyama	RISE 199	Tokyo, Japan	KO (punches)	2	1:23
2026-02-23	Win	(Japan) Ryunosuke Matsushita	RISE 196	Tokyo, Japan	TKO (doctor stoppage)	3	1:28
2025-04-19	Loss	(Japan) Taisei Umei	RISE 187	Tokyo, Japan	Decision (unanimous)	3	3:00
2023-12-10	Loss	(Japan) Yugo Kato	RISE 174	Tokyo, Japan	Decision (majority)	3	3:00
2022-12-25	Loss	(Japan) Koyata Yamada	RISE WORLD SERIES / SHOOTBOXING-KINGS 2022	Tokyo, Japan	KO (right cross)	2	1:21
2022-10-30	Win	(Japan) Hyuga	RISE 162	Tokyo, Japan	Decision (unanimous)	3	3:00
2021-09-23	Win	(Japan) Kyosuke	RISE WORLD SERIES 2021 Yokohama	Yokohama, Japan	Decision (unanimous)	3	3:00
2021-07-04	Loss	(Japan) Ryoga Terayama	Shooto 2021 Vol.4 - Cage Kick Championship, Final	Osaka, Japan	Ext.R decision (split)	4	3:00
For the 2021 Shooto Cage Kick Championship title.
2021-07-04	Win	(Japan) Takuro	Shooto 2021 Vol.4 - Cage Kick Championship, Semi Final	Osaka, Japan	Decision (unanimous)	3	3:00
2021-07-04	Win	(Japan) Ryunosuke Omori	Shooto 2021 Vol.4 - Cage Kick Championship, Quarter Final	Osaka, Japan	Decision (unanimous)	3	3:00
2021-02-22	Win	(Japan) Yu Hiramatsu	ROAD to ONE 4th: Young Guns	Tokyo, Japan	KO (3 knockdowns/spinning back fist)	2	2:25
2020-12-20	Win	(Japan) Keito Naito	Shooto 2020 vol.8	Osaka, Japan	Decision (majority)	3	3:00
2020-11-01	Win	(Japan) Ryoga Terayama	RISE Dead or Alive Osaka	Osaka, Japan	Decision (majority)	3	3:00
2020-09-10	Win	(Japan) Naoya Kuroda	ROAD to ONE 3rd: Tokyo Fight Night	Tokyo, Japan	KO (knee to the body)	2	2:22
2020-07-12	Win	(Japan) Tatsuma Kinosada	Shooto 2020 Vol.4 in Osaka	Osaka, Japan	Decision (unanimous)	3	3:00
2019-12-22	Draw	(Japan) Ryoga Terayama	Stand up Kickboxing Vol.1	Tokyo, Japan	Decision (unanimous)	3	3:00
2019-10-05	Win	(Malaysia) Lehe	ONE Warrior Series 8	Tokyo, Japan	TKO (doctor stoppage)	3	1:54
2019-07-21	Win	(Japan) Yuki Hamada	RISE WORLD SERIES 2019 Semi Final Round	Osaka, Japan	Decision (unanimous)	3	3:00
Legend: Win Loss Draw/no contest Notes

=== Amateur record ===
Amateur kickboxing record
Date	Result	Opponent	Event	Location	Method	Round	Time
2019-02-24	Win	(Japan) Ryuki Yoshii	NJKF 2019 west 1st	Osaka, Japan	Decision (unanimous)	3	2:00
2018-10-21	Win	(Japan) Ryoma Matsuzaki	Amateur Dageki Kakutougi Japan Cup 2018, Final	Tokyo, Japan	Decision (Split)	2	2:00
Wins 2018 Japan Cup -58kg title.
2018-10-21	Win	(Japan) Kazuya Kato	Amateur Dageki Kakutougi Japan Cup 2018, Semi Final	Tokyo, Japan			
2018-10-21	Win	(Japan)	Amateur Dageki Kakutougi Japan Cup 2018, Quarter Final	Tokyo, Japan			
2018-05-20	Win	(Japan) Shota Tanaka	HOOST CUP KING NAGOYA 04	Nagoya, Japan	Decision (unanimous)	2	2:00
2016-10-22	Win	(Japan) Ayato Kosaka	Amateur Dageki Kakutougi Japan Cup 2016, Final	Tokyo, Japan	Decision (unanimous)	1	3:00
Wins 2016 Japan Cup Middle School title.
2016-03-	Win	(Japan)	Green Boy Fight, Final	Kyoto, Japan			
Wins Green Boy Fight Welterweight title.
2016-03-	Win	(Japan) Niho	Green Boy Fight, Semi Final	Kyoto, Japan			
2015-09-06	Win	(Japan) Makoto Nishibe	Shoot Boxing Amateur Kansai	Osaka, Japan	Decision (unanimous)	2	2:00
2015-06-07	Win	(Japan) Ryo Yano	Shoot Boxing Amateur Kansai	Osaka, Japan	Decision (majority)	2	2:00
2015-03-01	Loss	(Japan) Yuushin Noguchi	HOOST CUP Spirit 5	Kyoto, Japan	Decision (unanimous)	2	2:00
2014-11-09	Loss	(Japan) Mau Tagawa	Shoot Boxing Amateur Kansai	Osaka, Japan	Decision (majority)	2	2:00
2014-06-29	Win	(Japan) Tomohiro Ushida	Shoot Boxing Amateur Kansai	Osaka, Japan	Decision (unanimous)	2	2:00
Legend: Win Loss Draw/no contest Notes

== See also ==
- List of male kickboxers
