= Shimon Yoshinari =

Japanese kickboxer

- Born: 吉成士門; September 4, 2004 (age 22); Yokosuka, Kanagawa, Japan
- Other names: Shimon P.K.Saenchai (ชิมง พี.เค.แสนชัยฯ); Shimon EiwasportsGym
- Height: 175 cm (5 ft 9 in)
- Weight: 61 kg (134 lb; 9.6 st)
- Division: Flyweight; Super Flyweight; Bantamweight; Featherweight; Super Featherweight; Lightweight
- Style: Muay Thai
- Stance: Orthodox
- Fighting out of: Yokohama, Japan
- Team: Eiwa Sports Gym

Kickboxing record
- Total: 44
- Wins: 39
- By knockout: 14
- Losses: 4
- No contests: 1

Other information
- Notable relatives: Nadaka Yoshinari (cousin)

Shimon Yoshinari is a Japanese Muay Thai kickboxer. He currently competes in the Flyweight division of ONE Championship. As of September 22, 2026, Shimon is ranked #4 in the ONE Flyweight Muay Thai rankings. He is the reigning WBC Muaythai World Lightweight Champion.

== Career ==
=== Early career ===
On December 6, 2020, Yoshinari faced Tenma at BOM WAVE 03 for the vacant WMC Japan Flyweight title. He won the fight by third-round knockout.

On November 7, 2021, Yoshinari faced Msayoshi Kunimoto at BOM WAVE 06 for the WMC Intercontinental Bantamweight title. He won the fight by unanimous decision.

On November 12, 2022, Yoshinari faced Takanobu Sano at BOM 37 as the semifinal of a Road to ONE Championship tournament. He won the fight by second-round knockout.

Yoshinari faced the then undefeated Ryu Hanaoka on February 24, 2021, at a NO KICK NO LIFE event. He won the fight by majority decision after five rounds.

On June 26, 2022, Yoshinari defeated Yuki Morioka by unanimous decision at Suk Wan Kingthong "to challenge" to capture the vacant WPMF International Super Bantamweight title.

Yoshinari defeated Ryota Mawatari by unanimous decision at BOM Road to ONE Japan as the final of the Road to ONE tournament. He earned a ONE Championship contract with that victory.

=== Rajadamnern World Series ===
On August 14, 2023, Yosinari faced Watcharapon Singhamawynn on the Muay Thai Pantamit promotion at the Thupatemi Stadium for the vacant Thailand Super-featherweight title. He won the fight by unanimous decision.

On December 23, 2023, Yoshinari rematched Watcharapon Singhamawynn on Rajadamnern World Series. He won the fight by unanimous decision.

On July 14, 2024, Yoshinari faced Wukong Sitjaroenwit at Rajadamnern World Series Japan. He won the fight by unanimous decision.

On September 23, 2024, Yoshinari faced Nongbew Jitmuangnon on the Muay Thai Pantamit promotion at the Thupatemi Stadium for the vacant Thailand Lightweight title. He won the fight by unanimous decision.

=== ONE Championship ===
Yoshinari made his ONE Championship debut on December 20, 2024, at ONE Friday Fights 92, against Rittidet Sor.Sommai. He won the fight by second-round technical knockout.

On March 23, 2025, Yoshinari faced Yodlekpet Or.Atchariya at ONE 172. He won the fight via unanimous decision.

On August 22, 2025, Yoshinari faced Pettonglor Sitluangpeenumfon at ONE Friday Fights 121. He won the fight by second-round technical knockout.

On October 5, 2025, Yoshinari faced Neungphusing Kor.Wuttichai for the vacant WBC Muay Thai World Lightweight title at BOM Ouroboros 2025. He won the fight by first-round knockout with a left hook.

On December 19, 2025, Yoshinari faced Dedduanglek Tded99 on ONE Friday Fights 137 at the Lumpinee Stadium. He won the fight by unanimous decision.

On April 29, 2026, Yoshinari faced Johan Ghazali at ONE Samurai 1. He won the fight by unanimous decision.

Yoshinari faced Suablack Tor.Pran49 at ONE Samurai 3. He won the fight by second-round knockout with a body punch.

Yoshinari was announced as one of the eight participants in the ONE Flyweight Muay Thai World Grand Prix. He was scheduled to face Ramadan Ondash on ONE The Inner Circle 38 for the quarterfinals of the Grand Prix.

== Titles and accomplishments ==
=== Professional ===
- World Muay Thai Council
  - 2020 WMC Japan Flyweight Champion
  - 2021 WMC Intercontinental Bantamweight Champion
- World Professional Muaythai Federation
  - 2022 WPMF International Super Bantamweight Champion
- Professional Boxing Association of Thailand (PAT)
  - 2023 Thailand Super-featherweight (130 lbs) Champion
  - 2024 Thailand Lightweight (135 lbs) Champion
- World Boxing Council Muay Thai
  - 2025 WBC Muay Thai World Lightweight (135 lbs) Champion

=== Amateur ===
- Suk Punpanmuang 25 kg Champion
- 2013 M-ONE WPMF 25 kg Champion
- 2014 M-ONE WPMF 30 kg Champion
- 2014 Battle of Muay Thai 30 kg Champion
- 2015 DBS -30 kg Champion
- 2015 Bigbang 31 kg Champion
- 2015 MA Kick Jr -32 kg Champion
- 2015 BOM Tournament 32.5 kg Champion
- 2015 SMASHERS 35 kg Champion
- 2016 WBC Muay Thai Jr League -31 kg Champion
- 2016 Suk Wan Kingthong 34 kg Champion
- 2016 Muay Thai Open 35 kg Champion
- 2016 Battle of Muay Thai -35 kg Champion
- 2017 WINDY Super Fight -38 kg Champion
- 2017 M-ONE WPMF -35 kg Champion
- 2017 Lumpinee Boxing Stadium of Japan -40 kg Champion
- 2017 M-ONE WPMF -40 kg Champion
- 2018 WINDY Super Fight -42 kg Champion
- 2018 M-ONE WPMF -40 kg Champion
- 2018 WMC Japan -40 kg Champion
- 2019 WPMF -50 kg Champion
- 2019 WMC Japan -50 kg Champion

== Fight record ==
Professional Muay Thai record
39 Wins (14 (T)KOs), 4 Losses, 0 Draw, 1 No Contest
Date	Result	Opponent	Event	Location	Method	Round	Time
2027-		(Thailand) Nong-O Hama	Lumpinee Stadium	Bangkok, Thailand			
ONE Flyweight Muay Thai World Grand Prix Semifinals.
2026-11-13	Win	(Lebanon) Ramadan Ondash	ONE The Inner Circle 38, Lumpinee Stadium	Bangkok, Thailand	Decision (unanimous)	3	3:00
ONE Flyweight Muay Thai World Grand Prix Quarterfinals.
2026-09-12	Win	(Thailand) Suablack Tor.Pran49	ONE Samurai 3	Yokohama, Japan	KO (left hook to the body)	2	2:28
2026-04-29	Win	(Malaysia) Johan Ghazali	ONE Samurai 1	Tokyo, Japan	Decision (unanimous)	3	3:00
2025-12-19	Win	(Thailand) Dedduanglek Tded99	ONE Friday Fights 137, Lumpinee Stadium	Bangkok, Thailand	Decision (unanimous)	3	3:00
2025-11-21	NC	(Russia) Tagir Khalilov	ONE Friday Fights 134, Lumpinee Stadium	Bangkok, Thailand	Doctor stoppage (eye poke)	2	1:22
2025-10-05	Win	(Thailand) Neungphusing Kor.Wuttichai	BOM OUROBOROS 2025	Yokosuka, Japan	KO (left hook)	1	2:33
Wins the vacant WBC Muay Thai World Lightweight (135 lbs) title.
2025-08-22	Win	(Thailand) Pettonglor Sitluangpeenumfon	ONE Friday Fights 121, Lumpinee Stadium	Bangkok, Thailand	TKO (3 knockdowns)	2	1:6
2025-03-23	Win	(Thailand) Yodlekpet Or.Atchariya	ONE 172	Saitama, Japan	Decision (unanimous)	3	3:00
2024-12-20	Win	(Thailand) Rittidet Sor.Sommai	ONE Friday Fights 92, Lumpinee Stadium	Bangkok, Thailand	TKO (referee stoppage)	2	0:39
2024-09-23	Win	(Thailand) Nongbew Jitmuangnon	Muay Thai Pantamit, Thupatemi Stadium	Pathum Thani, Thailand	Decision	5	3:00
Wins the vacant Thailand Lightweight (135 lbs) title.
2024-07-14	Win	(Thailand) Wukong Sitjaroenwit	Rajadamnern World Series Japan	Chiba, Japan	Decision (unanimous)	3	3:00
2024-06-09	Win	(Thailand) Thepmangorn FighterMuaythai	BOM 46	Yokohama, Japan	TKO (3 knockdowns)	1	2:30
2024-04-14	Win	(Thailand) Isannua Chotbangsaen	Rajadamnern World Series Japan	Chiba, Japan	Decision (unanimous)	3	3:00
2024-03-02	Win	(Australia) Ibrahim Abou Saleh	Rajadamnern World Series	Bangkok, Thailand	Decision (unanimous)	3	3:00
2023-12-23	Win	(Thailand) Watcharapon Singhamawynn	Rajadamnern World Series	Bangkok, Thailand	Decision (unanimous)	3	3:00
2023-11-26	Win	(Japan) Takehiko Umezawa	BOM 45	Yokohama, Japan	TKO (doctor stoppage)	4	3:00
2023-08-14	Win	(Thailand) Watcharapon Singhamawynn	Muay Thai Pantamit, Thupatemi Stadium	Pathum Thani, Thailand	Decision (unanimous)	5	3:00
Wins the vacant Thailand Super-featherweight (130 lbs) title.
2023-06-24	Loss	(Thailand) Paruhatnoi TBMgym	Omnoi Stadium	Samut Sakhon, Thailand	Decision	5	3:00
For the Omnoi Stadium Lightweight (135 lbs) title.
2023-04-09	Win	(Japan) Ryota Mawatari	BOM -OUROBOROS 2023- Road to ONE Tournament, Final	Tokyo, Japan	Decision (unanimous)	3	3:00
2023-01-25	Win	(Thailand) Petchsaenkom YaichueySeaFood	Muay Thai Palangmai, Rajadamnern Stadium	Bangkok, Thailand	KO (left hook)	2	0:12
2022-12-11	Win	(Japan) Takanobu Sano	BOM 37 - Road to ONE Tournament, Semifinal	Yokohama, Japan	KO (left hook)	2	2:27
2022-10-19	Win	(Thailand) Silangern LannaHomestay	Palangmai, Rajadamnern Stadium	Bangkok, Thailand	KO (knees)	3	
2022-06-26	Win	(Japan) Yuki Morioka	Suk Wan Kingthong "to challenge"	Tokyo, Japan	Decision (unanimous)	5	3:00
Wins the vacant WPMF International Super Bantamweight title.
2021-11-07	Win	(Japan) Masayoshi Kunimoto	BOM WAVE 06 – Get Over The COVID-19	Yokohama, Japan	Decision (unanimous)	5	3:00
Wins the WMC Intercontinental Bantamweight title.
2021-09-26	Win	(Japan) Keisuke Miyasaka	BOM – Ouroboros 2021 –	Tokyo, Japan	Decision (unanimous)	3	3:00
2021-05-30	Win	(Japan) Riamu Matsumoto	BOM ～ BOMBERS 001	Tokyo, Japan	Decision (unanimous)	3	3:00
2021-02-24	Win	(Japan) Ryu Hanaoka	NO KICK NO LIFE Shin Shou Ungaisouten	Tokyo, Japan	Decision (majority)	5	3:00
2020-12-06	Win	(Japan) Tenma	BOM WAVE 03 – Get Over The COVID-19	Yokohama, Japan	TKO (right cross)	3	3:00
Wins WMC Japan Flyweight title.
2020-10-04	Win	(Japan) Chikai	BOM WAVE 02 -Get Over The COVID-19-	Yokohama, Japan	Decision (unanimous)	5	3:00
2020-07-19	Win	(Japan) Iori Nakano	Suk Wan Kingthong Rookies	Tokyo, Japan	Decision (unanimous)	3	3:00
2019-12-15	Win	(Thailand) Rittidet Wor.Wanthawee	Chang MuayThai Kiatpetch Super Fight, OrTorGor3 Stadium	Nonthaburi, Thailand	KO (knee)	1	
2019-10-31	Win	(Thailand) Petchnamchai Siaekviset	Chujaroen Muay Thai, Rajadamnern Stadium	Bangkok, Thailand	KO	3	
2019-05-28	Loss	(Thailand) Yodbuangam Wisanukolkan	PK.Saenchai + Sor Jor Tongprachin, Lumpinee Stadium	Bangkok, Thailand	Decision	5	3:00
2019-02-10	Win	(Thailand) Monpichit DaenCentury	Kiatpetch, Jitmuangnon Stadium	Bangkok, Thailand	TKO	4	
2018-12-11	Loss	(Thailand) Yokngern Sitkongsiam	PK.Saenchai + Parunchai, Lumpinee Stadium	Bangkok, Thailand	Decision	5	3:00
2018-11-13	Win	(Thailand) Ekthawikun Moopingaroijungbei	PK.Saenchai, Lumpinee Stadium	Bangkok, Thailand	KO	3	
2018-08-10	Win	(Thailand) Ekayut Moopingaroijung	PK.Saenchai, Lumpinee Stadium	Bangkok, Thailand	Decision	5	3:00
2018-02-18	Loss	(Thailand) Sarawut Siyorsien	Suek Muaydee Withithai, Blue Arena	Samut Prakarn, Thailand	Decision	5	3:00
2016-08-13	Win	(Thailand) Danbrapa Nor.Rongresyortong	Rangsit Stadium	Rangsit, Thailand	Decision	5	3:00
2015-08-12	Win	(Thailand)	Queen's Birthday	Bangkok, Thailand			
2015-03-16	Win	(Thailand) Nattapon Lakrong	Miracle Muay Thai Festival	Ayuthaya, Thailand	KO (knees)	1	
Legend: Win Loss Draw/No contest Notes

=== Amateur record ===
Amateur Muay Thai and Kickboxing record
143 Wins, 28 Losses, 5 Draws
Date	Result	Opponent	Event	Location	Method	Round	Time
2019-11-29	Win	(Japan) Riku Otsu	WPMF Amateur 111	Tokyo, Japan			
Wins WPMF Amateur -50kg title.
2019-11-04	Win	(Japan) Riku Otsu :	KROSSxOVER 7	Saitama, Japan	Decision (unanimous)	2	2:00
2019-10-19	Win	(Japan) Riamu Matsumoto	WMC Japan Amateur	Tokyo, Japan	Decision	2	2:00
2019-09-22	Win	(Japan) Hibiki Seto	WPMF Amateur 110, Next Challenger Tournament Final	Tokyo, Japan			
2019-09-22	Win	(Japan) Arashi Sakamoto	WPMF Amateur 110, Next Challenger Tournament Semi Final	Tokyo, Japan			
2019-06-23	Win	(Japan) Riamu Matsumoto	WMC Japan Amateur	Tokyo, Japan	Decision	2	2:00
Wins WMC Japan Amateur -50kg title.
2019-02-24	Loss	(Japan) Riamu Matsumoto	KROSSxOVER 5	Saitama, Japan	Decision (unanimous)	2	2:00
2018-10-14	Win	(Japan) Daichi Kudaka	WMC Japan Amateur	Tokyo, Japan	Decision	2	2:00
2018-06-03	Win	(Japan) Rui Okubo	WPMF Amateur 101	Tokyo, Japan	Decision		
Wins WPMF M-ONE -40kg title.
2018-05-27	Win	(Japan) Hibiki Seto	9th WINDY Super Fight, Final	Tokyo, Japan	Decision (unanimous)	5	1:30
Wins WINDY Super Fight Tournament -42kg title.
2018-05-13	Win	(Japan) Ryuki Matsuda	1st WMC Japan Amateur, -40 kg Tournament Final	Tokyo, Japan	Decision	2	2:00
Wins WMC Japan Amateur -40kg title.
2018-04-08	Win	(Japan) Toki Oshika	BOM Amateur 23	Tokyo, Japan	Decision	2	2:00
2018-03-04	Win	(Japan) Daiya Oshikawa	8th WINDY Super Fight, Final	Tokyo, Japan	Decision (split)	5	1:30
Wins WINDY Super Fight Tournament -42kg title.
2018-03-04	Win	(Japan) Hibiki Seto	8th WINDY Super Fight, Semi Final	Tokyo, Japan	Decision (unanimous)	2	1:30
2018-02-11	Win	(Japan) Rui Okubo	Muay Thai Super Fight Suk Wan Kingtong vol.10	Tokyo, Japan	Decision	2	2:00
2018-02-04	Win	(Japan) Noa Fujiwara	BOM Amateur 22	Tokyo, Japan	Decision	2	2:00
2018-02-04	Win	(Japan) Hibiki Seto	BOM Amateur 22	Tokyo, Japan	Decision	2	2:00
2017-12-03	Win	(Japan) Riamu Matsumoto	Bigbang Amateur 43	Tokyo, Japan	Decision (unanimous)	2	1:30
2017-12-03	Win	(Japan) Aiki Oshika	Bigbang Amateur 43	Tokyo, Japan	Decision (unanimous)	2	1:30
2017-11-25	Loss	(Japan) Rui Okubo	WPMF Amateur 98	Tokyo, Japan	Decision		
Loses WPMF -40kg title.
2017-11-05	Win	(Japan) Toki Oshika	BOM Amateur 21	Kanagawa, Japan	Decision	2	2:00
2017-09-18	Win	(Japan) Kenken	WPMF Amateur 96	Tokyo, Japan			
Wins WPMF Amateur -40kg title.
2017-08-11	Win	(Japan) Shunji Abe	Muay Lok 3rd	Hachioji, Japan	Decision	2	2:00
2017-07-30	Win	(Japan) Kazuki Ozaki	WPMF Amateur 95	Tokyo, Japan			
2017-07-09	Loss	(Japan) Ruku Kondo	MuayThaiOpen 39	Tokyo, Japan	Decision	3	2:00
2017-06-25	Loss	(Japan) Taichi Shirakawa	BOM Amateur, 40 kg Tournament Final	Kanagawa, Japan	Decision	2	2:00
For the BOM -40kg title.
2017-06-25	Win	(Japan) Toki Oshika	BOM Amateur, 40 kg Tournament Semi Final	Kanagawa, Japan	Decision	2	2:00
2017-06-18	Win	(Japan) Rui Okubo	WPMF Amateur 94	Tokyo, Japan	Decision		
Wins WPMF -35kg title.
2017-06-04	Win	(Japan) Riamu Matsumoto	Bigbang Amateur 40	Tokyo, Japan	Decision (unanimous)	2	1:30
2017-04-16	Win	(Japan) Takumu Ishiwata	WPMF Amateur 93, Next Challenger Tournament Final	Tokyo, Japan			
2017-04-16	Win	(Japan) Seiya Sekiguchi	WPMF Amateur 93, Next Challenger Tournament Semi Final	Tokyo, Japan			
2017-04-02	Loss	(Japan) Shota Noda	Bigbang Amateur 39	Tokyo, Japan	Decision (unanimous)	2	1:30
2017-02-19	Win	(Japan) Yuichiro Watanabe	BOM Amateur 18	Yokohama, Japan	Decision	3	2:00
Defends BOM -35kg title.
2017-02-12	Draw	(Japan) Sora Sugiyama	Bigbang Amateur 38	Tokyo, Japan	Decision	2	1:30
2017-01-22	Win	(Japan) Aliyakare Yamamoto	5th WINDY Super Fight	Tokyo, Japan	Decision (unanimous)	5	1:30
Wins WINDY Super Fight -38kg title.
2016-12-25	Loss	(Japan) Wataru Hiramatsu	MuayThaiOpen 37	Tokyo, Japan	Decision	2	2:00
2016-11-06	Win	(Japan) Takuma Ishiwatari	BOM Amateur 17, -35 kg Championship Tournament Final	Tokyo, Japan	Decision	3	2:00
Wins BOM -35kg title.
2016-11-06	Win	(Japan) Ryoichi Sato	BOM Amateur 17, -35 kg Championship Tournament Semi Final	Tokyo, Japan	Decision	3	2:00
2016-10-09	Win	(Japan) Ryuse Murakami	Suk Wan Kingthong Amateur, Real Champion Tournament Final	Tokyo, Japan	Decision (unanimous)		
2016-10-09	Win	(Japan) Yosuke Uchida	Suk Wan Kinghtong Amateur, Real Champion Tournament Semi Final	Tokyo, Japan			
2016-10-02	Draw	(Japan) Wataru Hiramatsu	MuayThaiOpen 36	Tokyo, Japan	Decision	3	2:00
2016-10-01	Win	(Japan) Seki	PETER AERTS SPIRIT 2016	Yokohama, Japan	Decision	2	2:00
2016-09-04	Win	(Japan) Taiju Nozaki	Bigbang Amateur 36	Tokyo, Japan	Decision (unanimous)	2	1:30
2016-09-04	Loss	(Japan) Raize Umemoto	SMASHERS	Tokyo, Japan	Decision (split)		
2016-08-06	Win	(Japan) Yuusei Nakano	Muay Lok Hachioji	Hachoji, Japan	Decision (unanimous)	3	2:00
2016-07-23	Win	(Japan) Rui Okubo	2nd All Japan WBC Muay Thai Jr League Tournament, Final	Tokyo, Japan	Ext.R Decision	3	
Wins All Japan WBC Muay Thai Jr League -31kg title.
2016-07-23	Win	(Japan) Issei Hanazawa	2nd All Japan WBC Muay Thai Jr League Tournament, Semi Final	Tokyo, Japan	Decision		
2016-07-17	Win	(Japan)	MuayThaiOpen 35	Tokyo, Japan			
Defends MuayThaiOpen Amateur -35kg title.
2016-07-03	Loss	(Japan) Ryogo Komiyama	BOM Amateur 16	Tokyo, Japan	Decision	2	2:00
2016-06-05	Win	(Japan) Ryoichi Sato	BOM Amateur 15	Yokohama, Japan	Decision	2	1:30
2016-05-13	Loss	(Japan) Raize Umemoto	SMASHERS 180	Tokyo, Japan	Decision (split)		
2016-04-29	Win	(Japan) Raize Umemoto	SMASHERS 179	Tokyo, Japan	Decision (unanimous)		
2016-04-03	Win	(Japan) Sato	BOM Amateur 14	Tokyo, Japan	Decision	2	1:30
2016-02-21	Win	(Japan) Yosuke Uchida	Bigbang Amateur 30	Tokyo, Japan	Decision (unanimous)	3	1:30
Defends the Bigbang -31kg title.
2016-02-07	Win	(Japan)	MuayThaiOpen 34	Tokyo, Japan			
Wins MuayThaiOpen Amateur -35kg title.
2015-12-20	Loss	(Japan) Ryu Hanaoka	Suk Wan Kingthong, Real Champion Tournament 34 kg Final	Tokyo, Japan	Decision		
2015-12-20	Win	(Japan) Jinto Tokoro	Suk Wan Kingthong, Real Champion Tournament 34 kg Semi Final	Tokyo, Japan	Decision		
2015-12-12	Win	(Japan) Rui Okubo	JAKF "SMASHERS Champion's Carnival 2015"	Tokyo, Japan	Decision (unanimous)	2	1:30
Wins All Japan SMASHERS -30kg title.
2015-12-06	Win	(Japan) Yuto Moriyama	BOM Amateur, 32.5 kg Tournament Final	Kanagawa, Japan	Decision	2	2:00
2015-12-06	Win	(Japan) Takuto Wada	BOM Amateur, 32.5 kg Tournament Semi Final	Kanagawa, Japan	Decision	2	2:00
2015-12-06	Win	(Japan) Kosei Yoshida	BOM Amateur, 32.5 kg Tournament Quarter Final	Kanagawa, Japan	Decision	2	2:00
2015-09-06	Win	(Japan) Keigo Nishikawa	Bigbang Amateur 30	Tokyo, Japan	Decision	3	1:30
Wins the Bigbang -31kg title.
2015-08-30	Loss	(Japan) Rui Yamaguchi	1st WBC Muay Thai Jr League, All Japan Tournament Final	Tokyo, Japan	Decision		
For the 2015 WBC Muay Thai Jr League All Japan -31kg title.
2015-08-30	Win	(Japan) Yuki Baba	1st WBC Muay Thai Jr League, All Japan Tournament Semi Final	Tokyo, Japan	Decision		
2015-08-02	Loss	(Japan) Ryu Hanaoka	Suk Wan Kingthong, Real Champion Tournament 34 kg Semi Final	Tokyo, Japan	Decision	2	1:30
2015-08-02	Win	(Japan) Asato Nishiyama	Suk Wan Kingthong, Real Champion Tournament 34 kg Quarter Final	Tokyo, Japan	Decision	2	1:30
2015-07-26	Win	(Japan) Iroha Abe	A-LEAGUE 31 DELUXE - DBS Kids -30 kg Tournament, Final	Miyagi prefecture, Japan	Decision (unanimous)		
2015-07-26	Win	(Japan) Ryotaro Kusano	A-LEAGUE 31 DELUXE - DBS Kids -30 kg Tournament, Semi Final	Miyagi prefecture, Japan	KO	1	1:23
2015-07-26	Win	(Japan) Kaito Kondo	A-LEAGUE 31 DELUXE - DBS Kids -30 kg Tournament, Quarter Final	Miyagi prefecture, Japan	KO	1	1:03
2015-07-19	Win	(Japan) Sena Ohno	BOM Amateur 12	Kanagawa, Japan	Decision	2	2:00
2015-06-07	Draw	(Japan) Ryoga Terayama	Bigbang Amateur 25	Tokyo, Japan	Decision	2	1:30
2015-06-14	Loss	(Japan) Taisuke Yamada	JAKF SMASHERS 174	Tokyo, Japan	Decision	3	1:30
For the SMASHERS -30kg title.
2015-05-10	Win	(Japan) Sento Ito	Wanchai+PK MuayThai Super Fight	Nagoya, Japan	Decision (unanimous)	2	2:00
2015-04-29	Win	(Japan) Iku Koiwa	BOM Amateur	Kanagawa, Japan	Decision	2	2:00
2015-04-05	Loss	(Japan) Ryogo Komiyama	BOM Amateur 10	Kanagawa, Japan	Decision	2	2:00
2015-04-05	Loss	(Japan) Daiya Kira	BOM Amateur 10	Kanagawa, Japan	Decision	2	2:00
2015-03-29	Draw	(Japan) Keigo Nishikawa	MuayThaiPhoon vol.1	Nagoya, Japan	Decision	2	2:00
2015-03-29	Win	(Japan) Maiku Tanaka	MuayThaiPhoon vol.1	Nagoya, Japan	Decision (unanimous)	2	2:00
2015-03-08	Win	(Japan) Yoshiki	MA Nihon Kick TRADITION 2～STAIRWAY TO DREAM	Tokyo, Japan	Decision (unanimous)	3	2:00
Wins MA Kick Jr -32kg title.
2014-12-21	Loss	(Japan) Ryu Hanaoka	WINDY SPORTS, Final	Tokyo, Japan	Decision	5	
For the WINDY SPORTS Muay Thai -30kg title.
2014-12-21	Win	(Japan) Taiga Kobayashi	WINDY SPORTS, Semi Final	Tokyo, Japan	KO (knees)	2	
2014-12-14	Loss	(Japan) Ryogo Komiyama	BOM Amateur 8	Yokohama, Japan	Decision	2	2:00
2014-10-19	Win	(Japan) Taichi Shirakawa	WPMF BOM Amateur	Kanagawa, Japan	Decision	2	2:00
2014-10-19	Win	(Japan) Iwao Okazaki	WPMF BOM Amateur	Kanagawa, Japan	Decision	2	2:00
2014-08-17	Loss	(Japan) Eiji Katsura	MUAYTHAI WINDY SUPER FIGHT vol.17	Kanagawa, Japan	Decision (unanimous)	2	2:00
2014-07-06	Loss	(Japan) Reito Komiyama	The Battle of Muay Thai Amateur 7	Tokyo, Japan	Decision	2	2:00
2014-06-29	Loss	(Japan) Daiya Kira	Muay Thai WINDY Super Fight vol.16, Semi Final	Tokyo, Japan			
2014-06-29	Win	(Japan) Keigo Nishikawa	Muay Thai WINDY Super Fight vol.16, Quarter Final	Tokyo, Japan			
2014-05-06	Loss	(Japan) Ryu Hanaoka	The Battle of Muay Thai Amateur 6	Tokyo, Japan	Decision	3	2:00
For the BOM -28.5kg title.
2014-04-13	Loss	(Japan) Koiwa	BOM Amateur 5	Tokyo, Japan	Decision	2	2:00
2014-04-05	Loss	(Japan) Reito Komiyama	BOM Amateur	Tokyo, Japan	Decision	2	2:00
2014-04-05	Loss	(Japan) Daiya Kira	BOM Amateur	Tokyo, Japan	Decision	2	2:00
2014-02-23		(Japan) Ryoga Terayama	Bigbang Amateur 19	Tokyo, Japan	Decision	2	1:30
2014-01-19	Loss	(Japan) Shota Noda	BOM Amateur 4	Yokohama, Japan	Decision	2	2:00
2014-01-19	Loss	(Japan) Ryu Hanaoka	BOM Amateur 4	Yokohama, Japan	Decision	2	2:00
2013-12-08	Win	(Japan) Kyouwa/Kyouka Nishikibe	M-fight SUK WEERASAKRECK Amateur 63	Tokyo, Japan	Decision		
For the Bigbang -25kg title.
2013-12-01	Loss	(Japan) Yosuke Uchida	Bigbang Amateur 18	Tokyo, Japan	Decision	3	2:00
For the Bigbang -25kg title.
2013-10-13	Win	(Japan) Sento Ito	Bigbang Amateur 17, Final	Tokyo, Japan	Decision	3	2:00
2013-10-13	Win	(Japan) Ryu	Bigbang Amateur 17, Semi Final	Tokyo, Japan	Decision	2	2:00
2013-09-08	Loss	(Japan) Shota Noda	BOM Amateur 2	Kanagawa, Japan	Decision	2	1:30
2013-07-14	Win	(Japan) Raize Umemoto	Bigbang Amateur 15, Final	Tokyo, Japan	Decision	2	1:30
2013-07-14	Win	(Japan) Yamato Tokoyoda	Bigbang Amateur 15, Semi Final	Tokyo, Japan	Decision	2	1:30
2013-06-02	Win	(Japan) Kirato Agarie	Bigbang Amateur 14	Tokyo, Japan	Decision	2	1:30
2013-05-12	Win	(Japan) Iku Koiwa	BOM Amateur 1	Kanagawa, Japan	Decision	2	1:30
2013-05-05	Loss	(Japan) Ryoga Terayama	Bigbang Amateur 13	Tokyo, Japan	Decision (unanimous)	2	1:30
Legend: Win Loss Draw/No contest Notes
