= Ryu Hanaoka =

Japanese kickboxer (born 2003)

- Born: 花岡 竜 November 30, 2003 (age 22); Akishima, Tokyo, Japan
- Other names: Reiwa Monster
- Height: 1.63 m (5 ft 4 in)
- Weight: 53 kg (117 lb; 8.3 st)
- Style: Kickboxing
- Stance: Orthodox
- Fighting out of: Fussa, Tokyo, Japan
- Team: Hashimoto Dojo
- Years active: 2019–present

Kickboxing record
- Total: 33
- Wins: 29
- By knockout: 9
- Losses: 3
- By knockout: 1
- Draws: 1

Ryu Hanaoka (Japanese: 花岡 竜, Hanaoka Ryu; born November 30, 2003) is a Japanese kickboxer. A professional competitor since 2019, Hanaoka is a former KNOCK OUT Black Super Flyweight champion and RISE Super Flyweight Champion

As of August 2023, he is the #3 ranked strawweight kickboxer in the world according to Combat Press. Hanaoka first entered the divisional rankings in July 2022.

== Biography and career ==
=== Early career ===
==== Professional career beginnings ====
After an amateur career of over 150 fights during which he amassed 28 titles, Hanaoka was scheduled to make his professional debut on May 19, 2019, against Korean fighter An Jong-Ho at the Japan Kickboxing Innovation "Join Forces 13" event. He won by technical knockout in the second round.

On November 1, 2019, Hanaoka made his debut for the KNOCK OUT promotion, he faced Hitoshi Sato at the KNOCK OUT 2019 BREAKING DAWN event. He won by unanimous decision.

==== Innovation flyweight champion ====
On August 23, 2020, Hanaoka won his first professional title when he defeated Daiya Oshikawa by unanimous decision after five rounds at Japan Kickboxing Innovation Join Forces 16 for the Flyweight title.

Hanaoka saw his winning streak broken on October 29, 2020, at the NO KICK NO LIFE "New Chapter" event when he faced HIROYUKI in a three-round fight that ended in a split draw.

Hanaoka faced Rising Chikara at Japan Kickboxing Innovation Champions Carnival 2020 on December 27, 2020. He won the fight by unanimous decision, with scores of 50–47, 50–46 and 49–46.

Hanaoka suffered his first professional loss on February 24, 2021, against Shimon Yoshinari at a NO KICK NO LIFE event where he was defeated by majority decision after five rounds.

After suffering his first professional loss, Hanaoka was booked to face Kiminori Matsuzaki at KNOCK OUT 2021 vol.2 on May 22, 2021. He won the fight by a second-round technical knockout, as the fight was stopped on the advice of the ringside physician due to a cut suffered by Matsuzaki.

Hanaoka was next booked to face the former Lumpinee Stadium champion Visanlek Meibukai at NO KICK NO LIFE Shin Shou Yuigadokuson on July 22, 2021. He won the fight by unanimous decision, with all three judges scoring the bout 30–28 in his favor.

==== Innovation and Knock Out flyweight champion ====
On September 25, 2021, Hanaoka participated in the KNOCK OUT Black Flyweight Championship tournament, held to crown the inaugural flyweight champion. In the semi-final he defeated Kuryu by unanimous decision, with scores of 30–29, 30–29 and 29–28. In the final he defeated Takumi Hamada by unanimous decision to capture his first K-1 rules kickboxing title.

Hanaoka faced Ryuto Oinuma at KNOCK OUT 2021 vol.6 on November 28, 2021. He won the fight by a first-round knockout, stopping Oinuma with a left hook to the body at the 2:24 minute mark of the opening round.

On January 9, 2022, Hanaoka faced his most notable opponent yet when matched with reigning Battle of MuayThai and WPMF World champion Issei Ishii at a NO KICK NO LIFE event. He created the surprise and won by unanimous decision after five rounds.

On March 13, 2022, Hanaoka took part in the Japan Kickboxing Innovation Zaimax one night open finger gloves 4-man tournament. In the semi-final he defeated HIROYUKI by unanimous decision after scoring a knockdown with a body shot in the second round. In the final he defeated Yu Hiramatsu by first-round knockout with a straight punch to the body to win the tournament and the 300,000 yen cash prize.

Hanaoka was scheduled to face Phetsongchai Songnintai on April 27, 2022, at the Chakuriki 15 event. He won the fight by knockout, scoring three knockdowns in the first round.

=== RISE ===
Hanaoka made his promotional debut with RISE against Koudai Hirayama at RISE 159 on June 24, 2022. He won the fight by unanimous decision, with all three judges awarding him a 30–29 scorecard.

On July 28, 2022, Hashimoto Dojo revealed that Hanaoka had vacated the KNOCK OUT Black Super Flyweight title. On the same day, at a separate press conference held by RISE, it was announced that Hanaoka would face the second ranked RISE super flyweight contender Jin Mandokoro at RISE 161 on August 28, 2022. He won the fight by a third-round technical knockout. The fight was stopped 21 seconds into the round, due to a cut on Mandokoro's eyelid.

Hanaoka faced the #12 ranked Tsubasa at RISE World Series 2022 on October 15, 2022. He was dismissive of his opponent during the pre-fight press conference, stating: "I want to show there's a difference between top ranked and bottom ranked fighters". Hanaoka lost the fight by an upset technical decision, with all three judges scoring it 20–19 for Tsubasa. The bout was stopped four seconds before the second round expired, due to an accidental clash of heads which left a cut above Tsubasa's right eye.

Hanaoka took part in a NO KICK NO LIFE bantamweight tournament, the quarterfinals of which were held on February 11, 2023. He overcame Sanchai TeppenGym by split decision in the quarterfinals and advanced to the semifinals, which were held on May 21, 2023, where he faced Koki Yamada. Hanaoka won the fight by a flying knee stoppage midway through the opening round and faced HIROYUKI in the tournament finals, which were held on the same night. He captured the bantamweight title, as well as the ¥1 million in prize money, by unanimous decision. Two of the judges scored the fight 50–47 in his favor, while the third ringside official scored the fight 49–48 for Hanaoka.

Hanaoka faced the one-time ISKA Oriental rules World Flyweight title challenger Nicolas Rivas in a -54 kg catchweight bout at RISE World Series 2023 - 2nd Round on August 26, 2023. He won the fight by unanimous decision, with all three judges scoring the bout 30–27 in his favor.

Hanaoka faced the one-time RISE Bantamweight title challenger Jin Mandokoro in the semifinals of the 2023 RISE Bantamweight New Warriors tournament, which took place at RISE 173 on November 18, 2023. He lost the fight by a first-round knockout.

Hanaoka faced the reigning Krush Bantamweight champion Koji Ikeda in a cross-promotional bout at RISE ELDORADO 2024 on March 17, 2024. He won the fight by unanimous decision.

Hanaoka faced Kaito Hasegawa at RISE 179 on June 30, 2024. He won the fight by unanimous decision.

==== Super flyweight champion ====
Hanaoka faced Jin Mandokoro for the vacant RISE Super Flyweight (-53 kg) title at RISE 184 on December 15, 2025. The bout was a rematch of their fight 13 months prior, when Mandokoro was able to win by a first-round technical knockout. Hanaoka proved the more successful fighter in the rematch, as he won the fight by unanimous decision, with scores of 50—46, 50—45 and 50—45.

Hanaoka faced the 15-year old Muhammad Mikail Ghazali in a -54 kg catchweight bout at RISE WORLD SERIES 2025 Yokohama on June 21, 2025.

Hanaoka faced Momu Tsukamoto at RISE WORLD SERIES 2025 Tokyo on August 2, 2025. He won the fight by a second-round technical knockout.

Hanaoka vacated the RISE Super Flyweight title on January 17, 2026 in order to move up in weight.

== Championships and accomplishments ==
=== Professional ===
- Japan Kickboxing Innovation
  - 2020 INNOVATION Flyweight Champion
  - 2022 ZAIMAX MUAYTHAI -53 kg Tournament winner
  - 2023 NO KICK NO LIFE Bantamweight Tournament winner
- KNOCK OUT
  - 2021 KNOCK OUT Black Super Flyweight Champion
- RISE
  - 2024 RISE Super Flyweight (-53 kg) Champion
- International Sport Kickboxing Association
  - 2026 ISKA Unified rules World Bantamweight (-55 kg) Champion

=== Amateur ===
- Battle of Muaythai
  - 2014 Battle of Muay Thai -28.5 kg Champion
  - 2014 Battle of Muay Thai -30 kg Tournament winner
- Windy Sports
  - 2014 Windy Sports Muay Thai -30 kg Champion
- All Japan Jr. Kick
  - 2015 All Japan Jr. Kick Tournament -30 kg winner
  - 2017 All Japan SMASHERS -45 kg Champion
- Japan Kickboxing Innovation
  - 2015 SMASHERS -35 kg Champion & Excellent Fighter Award
  - 2017 SMASHERS -50 kg Champion
  - 2016 SMASHERS -40 kg Champion
- World Professional MuayThai Federation
  - 2015 WPMF M-ONE Weerasakreck -30 kg Champion
  - 2016 WPMF M-ONE Weerasakreck -35 kg Champion
  - 2017 WPMF M-ONE Weerasakreck -45 kg Champion
  - 2017 WPMF M-ONE Weerasakreck -50 kg Champion
  - 2018 WPMF M-ONE Weerasakreck -50 kg Champion
- Suk Wan Kingthong
  - 2015 Wan Kingthong Real Champion Tournament -34 kg winner
  - 2016 Wan Kingthong Real Champion Tournament -38 kg winner
- MuayThaiOpen
  - 2015 MuayThaiOpen -35 kg Champion
- REBELS
  - 2016 REBELS Blow Cup -40 kg winner & Event MVP
- World Boxing Council Muaythai
  - 2016 WBC Muay Thai All Japan Jr. League Middle School -34 kg runner-up
  - 2018 WBC Muay Thai All Japan Jr. League -50 kg Champion and Best Fighter Award
- New Japanese Kickboxing Federation
  - 2016 NJKF Explosion -37 kg Champion
  - 2017 NJKF Explosion -45 kg Champion
- Lumpinee Boxing Stadium of Japan
  - 2017 Lumpinee Boxing Stadium of Japan -45 kg Champion
  - 2018 Lumpinee Boxing Stadium of Japan U-15 Flyweight Champion

== Fight record ==
Professional kickboxing record
29 wins (9 (T)KOs), 3 losses, 1 draw
Date	Result	Opponent	Event	Location	Method	Round	Time
2026-12-20		(Morocco) Akram Ouchibi	RISE World Series 2026 Tokyo Final -55kg Tournament, Quarterfinals	Tokyo, Japan			
2026-09-19	Win	(Japan) Yusei Horimoto	RISE World Series 2026 Tokyo 2	Tokyo, Japan	Decision (unanimous)	3	3:00
2026-07-12	Win	(France) Djillali Kharroubi	RISE 200	Tokyo, Japan	Decision (unanimous)	5	3:00
Wins the vacant ISKA Unified rules World Bantamweight (-55 kg) title.
2025-12-14	Win	(Japan) Masahiko Suzuki	RISE 194	Tokyo, Japan	Decision (unanimous)	3	3:00
2025-08-02	Win	(Japan) Momu Tsukamoto	RISE WORLD SERIES 2025 Tokyo	Tokyo, Japan	TKO (punches)	2	1:53
2025-06-21	Win	(Malaysia) Muhammad Mikail Ghazali	RISE WORLD SERIES 2025 Yokohama	Yokohama, Japan	Decision (unanimous)	3	3:00
2024-12-15	Win	(Japan) Jin Mandokoro	RISE 184	Tokyo, Japan	Decision (unanimous)	5	3:00
Wins the vacant RISE Super Flyweight (-53 kg) title.
2024-06-30	Win	(Japan) Kaito Hasegawa	RISE 179	Tokyo, Japan	Decision (unanimous)	3	3:00
2024-03-17	Win	(Japan) Koji Ikeda	RISE ELDORADO 2024	Tokyo, Japan	Decision (unanimous)	3	3:00
2023-11-18	Loss	(Japan) Jin Mandokoro	RISE 173 - New Warriors Tournament, Semifinals	Tokyo, Japan	TKO (2 knockdowns/punches)	1	2:15
2023-08-26	Win	(France) Nicolas Rivas	RISE World Series 2023 - 2nd Round	Tokyo, Japan	Decision (unanimous)	3	3:00
2023-05-21	Win	(Japan) Hiroyuki	Japan Kickboxing Innovation Okayama Gym Show 9 - NO KICK NO LIFE Tournament, Final	Tokyo, Japan	Decision (unanimous)	5	3:00
Wins the 2023 NO KICK NO LIFE Bantamweight Tournament.
2023-05-21	Win	(Japan) Koki Yamada	Japan Kickboxing Innovation Okayama Gym Show 9 - NO KICK NO LIFE Tournament, Semifinals	Tokyo, Japan	KO (flying knee)	1	1:31
2023-02-11	Win	(Thailand) Sanchai TeppenGym	NO KICK NO LIFE - Bantamweight Tournament, Quarter-final	Tokyo, Japan	Decision (split)	3	3:00
2022-10-15	Loss	(Japan) Tsubasa	RISE WORLD SERIES 2022	Tokyo, Japan	Tech. decision (unanimous)	2	2:56
2022-08-28	Win	(Japan) Jin Mandokoro	RISE 161	Tokyo, Japan	TKO (doctor stoppage)	3	0:21
2022-06-24	Win	(Japan) Koudai	RISE 159	Tokyo, Japan	Decision (unanimous)	3	3:00
2022-04-27	Win	(Thailand) Phetsongchai Sor Ninthai	Chakuriki 15 Fujiwara Festival	Tokyo, Japan	TKO (3 knockdowns)	1	2:55
2022-03-13	Win	(Japan) Yu Hiramatsu	Japan Kickboxing Innovation Okayama Gym Show 8 - Zaimax Muaythai Tournament, Final	Okayama, Japan	KO (straight to the body)	1	1:37
Wins the ZAIMAX MUAYTHAI -53kg Tournament.
2022-03-13	Win	(Japan) Hiroyuki	Japan Kickboxing Innovation Okayama Gym Show 8 - Zaimax Muaythai Tournament, Semifinals	Okayama, Japan	Decision (unanimous)	3	3:00
2022-01-09	Win	(Japan) Issei Ishii	NO KICK NO LIFE	Tokyo, Japan	Decision (unanimous)	5	3:00
2021-11-28	Win	(Japan) Ryuto Oinuma	KNOCK OUT 2021 vol.6	Tokyo, Japan	KO (left hook to the body)	1	2:24
2021-09-25	Win	(Japan) Takumi Hamada	KNOCK OUT 2021 vol.4 - Super Flyweight Championship Tournament, Final	Tokyo, Japan	Decision (unanimous)	3	3:00
Wins the inaugural KNOCK OUT Black Super Flyweight title.
2021-09-25	Win	(Japan) Ryuta Suekuni	KNOCK OUT 2021 vol.4 - Super Flyweight Championship Tournament, Semi-final	Tokyo, Japan	Decision (unanimous)	3	3:00
2021-07-22	Win	(Thailand) Visanlek Meibukai	NO KICK NO LIFE Shin Shou Yuigadokuson	Tokyo, Japan	Decision (unanimous)	3	3:00
2021-05-22	Win	(Japan) Kiminori Matsuzaki	KNOCK OUT 2021 vol.2	Tokyo, Japan	TKO (doctor stoppage)	2	2:46
2021-02-24	Loss	(Japan) Shimon Yoshinari	NO KICK NO LIFE Shin Shou Ungaisouten	Tokyo, Japan	Decision (majority)	5	3:00
2020-12-27	Win	(Japan) Rising Chikara	Japan Kickboxing Innovation Champions Carnival 2020	Tokyo, Japan	Decision (unanimous)	5	3:00
2020-10-29	Draw	(Japan) Hiroyuki	NO KICK NO LIFE ~Shin Shou~	Tokyo, Japan	Decision (split)	3	3:00
2020-08-23	Win	(Japan) Daiya Oshikawa	Japan Kickboxing Innovation Join Forces 16	Tokyo, Japan	Decision (unanimous)	5	3:00
Wins vacant Japan Kickboxing Innovation Flyweight title.
2019-12-01	Win	(Thailand) Bangsaphan SaenchaiGym	MuayThaiOpen 47	Tokyo, Japan	Decision (unanimous)	3	3:00
2019-11-01	Win	(Japan) Hitoshi Sato	KNOCK OUT 2019 BREAKING DAWN	Tokyo, Japan	Decision (unanimous)	3	3:00
2019-07-15	Win	(Japan) Yu Hiramatsu	Japan Kickboxing Innovation Join Forces 14	Tokyo, Japan	TKO (referee stoppage)	3	2:21
2019-05-19	Win	(Korea) Ahn Jeong-ho	Japan Kickboxing Innovation Join Forces 13	Tokyo, Japan	TKO (referee stoppage)	2	1:20
Legend: Win Loss Draw/no contest Notes

=== Amateur record ===
Amateur kickboxing record
122 wins, 20 losses, 15 draws
Date	Result	Opponent	Event	Location	Method	Round	Time
2018-08-05	Win	(Japan) Ryoga Terayama	WBC Muay Thai All Japan Junior League, Final	Tokyo, Japan	Decision	2	1:30
Wins 2018 WBC Muay Thai Jr League -50kg title.
2018-08-05	Win	(Japan) Shoryu Kishimoto	WBC Muay Thai All Japan Junior League, Semi-final	Tokyo, Japan	Decision	2	1:30
2018-08-05	Win	(Japan) Sojiro Kawaguchi	WBC Muay Thai All Japan Junior League, Quarter-final	Tokyo, Japan	Decision	2	1:30
2018-07-22	Win	(Japan) Toranosuke Matsuda	MuayThaiOpen 42	Tokyo, Japan	TKO	2	1:12
2018-07-08	Win	(Japan) Ryoga Terayama	NJKF Explosion 16, WBC Muay Thai Jr League Selection Tournament, Final	Tokyo, Japan	Decision	2	1:30
2018-07-08	Win	(Japan) Seima Suga	NJKF Explosion 16, WBC Muay Thai Jr League Selection Tournament, Semi-final	Tokyo, Japan	Decision	2	1:30
2018-06-03	Win	(Japan) Eiji Katsura	WPMF Amateur 101	Tokyo, Japan	Decision (unanimous)		
Wins WPMF M-ONE -50kg title.
2018-05-13	Win	(Japan) Hiroa Sakurai	JAKF SMASHERS 194	Tokyo, Japan	Decision (unanimous)	3	1:30
Defends SMASHERS -50kg title.
2018-04-30	Win	(Japan) Yusei Shirahata	MuayThaiOpen 41	Tokyo, Japan	Decision	3	3:00
2018-04-15	Win	(Japan) Hiroa Sakurai	NJKF Explosion 15	Tokyo, Japan	Decision	2	1:30
2018-04-01	Loss	(Japan) Kazuto Nishimoto	WPMF Amateur 100 M-ONE	Tokyo, Japan	Decision	2	1:30
For the WPMF Amateur M-ONE -50kg title.
2018-03-11	Loss	(Japan) Koyata Yamada	Shootboxing Amateur	Tokyo, Japan	Decision (unanimous)	2	2:00
2018-03-04	Loss	(Japan) Eiji Katsura	WINDY Super Fight 8 - Kick Tournament, Final	Tokyo, Japan	Decision (split)	3	2:00
For the WINDY Super Fight Kick -50kg title.
2018-03-04	Win	(Japan) Takumi Fujita	WINDY Super Fight 8 - Kick Tournament, Semi-final	Tokyo, Japan	Decision (majority)	2	1:30
2018-03-04	Win	(Japan) Hiroa Sakurai	WINDY Super Fight 8 - Kick Tournament, Quarter-final	Tokyo, Japan	Decision (unanimous)	2	1:30
2018-02-22	Win	(Japan) Ren	WPMF Amateur 99	Tokyo, Japan			
2018-02-11	Win	(Japan) Yuki Baba	Muay Thai Super Fight Suk Wan Kingtong vol.10	Tokyo, Japan	Decision	2	2:00
2018-02-04	Win	(Japan) Hiroa Sakurai	NJKF Explosion 14	Tokyo, Japan	Decision	2	1:30
2018-01-21	Win	(Japan) Asato Nishiyama	SMASHERS 192	Tokyo, Japan	Decision (unanimous)		
2017-12-30	Win	(Japan) Riku Kondo	KAMINARIMON Junior -45 kg Tournamrnt, Final	Tokyo, Japan	Decision (unanimous)		
2017-12-30	Win	(Japan) Ryogo Komiyama	KAMINARIMON Junior -45 kg Tournamrnt, Semi-final	Tokyo, Japan	Ext.R decision (unanimous)		
2017-12-17	Win	(Japan) Hiroto Inoue	SMASHERS Jr Champions Carnival 2017	Tokyo, Japan	Decision (unanimous)		
Defends SMASHERS -50kg title.
2017-11-26	Win	(Japan) Yu Hiramatsu	MuayThaiOpen 40	Tokyo, Japan	Decision (majority)	3	2:00
Wins U-15 Lumpinee Boxing Stadium of Japan Flyweight title.
2017-09-18	Win	(Japan) Yuma Ishiwatari	WPMF Amateur 96	Tokyo, Japan			
Wins WPMF Amateur M-ONE -50kg title.
2017-09-03	Loss	(Japan) Koyata Yamada	NJKF Explosion 12	Tokyo, Japan	Decision	2	1:30
2017-08-07	Loss	(Japan)	WBC Muay Thai Jr League	Tokyo, Japan	Decision	2	1:30
2017-07-30	Win	(Japan) Yusei Murai	WPMF Amateur 95	Tokyo, Japan	Decision		
2017-07-09	Win	(Japan) Yuma Ishiwatari	MuayThaiOpen 39 Lumpinee Boxing Stadium of Japan	Tokyo, Japan	Decision (majority)	3	2:00
2017-07-02	Win	(Japan) Eiji Katsura	NJKF Explosion 11	Tokyo, Japan	Decision	3	1:30
Defends NJKF Explosion -45kg title.
2017-06-25	Win	(Japan) Shun Tsutsumi	17th SMASHERS All Japan Tournament, Final	Tokyo, Japan	Decision (unanimous)		
Wins All Japan SMASHERS -45kg title.
2017-06-25	Win	(Japan) Shoma Ozaki	17th SMASHERS All Japan Tournament, Semi-final	Tokyo, Japan	Decision (unanimous)		
2017-06-18	Win	(Japan) Eiji Katsura	WPMF Amateur 94	Tokyo, Japan	KO (knee)	3	
Wins WPMF Amateur -45kg title.
2017-05-28	Win	(Japan) Toranosuke Matsuda	SMASHERS	Tokyo, Japan	Decision (unanimous)		
Wins SMASHERS -45kg title.
2017-05-13	Win	(Japan) Yuki Baba	Shootboxing Amateur 16	Tokyo, Japan	Decision (unanimous)		
2017-04-30	Win	(Japan) Toranosuke Matsuda	Shuken 35	Tokyo, Japan	Decision (unanimous)		
2017-04-16	Win	(Japan) Hikaru Sasaki	NJKF Explosion 10	Tokyo, Japan	Decision	2	1:30
2017-04-02	Win	(Japan) Yuki Baba	MuayThaiOpen38	Tokyo, Japan	Decision (unanimous)	3	2:00
Wins Lumpinee Boxing Stadium of Japan -45kg title.
2017-03-20	Win	(Japan) Kazuto Nishimoto	WPMF Amateur 92 M-ONE	Tokyo, Japan	Decision (split)		
Wins WPMF Amateur M-ONE -45kg title.
2017-03-20	Win	(Japan) Eiji Katsura	WPMF Amateur 92 M-ONE	Tokyo, Japan			
2017-03-11	Win	(Japan) Yuki Baba	Shootboxing Amateur	Tokyo, Japan	Decision (unanimous)		
2017-03-05	Win	(Japan) Tenma Nagai	NJKF Explosion 9	Tokyo, Japan	Decision	2	1:30
Wins NJKF Explosion -45kg title.
2017-02-19	Win	(Japan) Ren	WPMF Amateur 91	Tokyo, Japan	Decision		
2017-02-12	Draw	(Japan) Tenma Nagai	NJKF Explosion 8	Tokyo, Japan	Decision	2	1:30
2017-02-12	Draw	(Japan) Eiji Katsura	NJKF Explosion 8	Tokyo, Japan	Decision	2	1:30
2016-12-25	Win	(Japan) Yuki Baba	MuayThaiOpen 37 Lumpinee Boxing Stadium of Japan	Tokyo, Japan	Decision (unanimous)	3	2:00
2016-12-11	Loss	(Japan) Ryoga Terayama	KAMINARIMON All Japan Junior, -40 kg Semi-final	Tokyo, Japan	Decision (split)		
2016-12-11	Win	(Japan) Raize Umemoto	KAMINARIMON All Japan Junior, -40 kg Quarter-final	Tokyo, Japan	Decision (unanimous)		
2016-11-25	Win	(Japan) Asei Shimizu	JAKF SMASHERS 184	Tokyo, Japan	KO	2	0:52
2016-11-23	Win	(Japan) Tenma	WPMF Amateur 89, Final	Tokyo, Japan			
2016-11-23	Win	(Japan) Jinto Tokoro	WPMF Amateur 89, Semi-final	Tokyo, Japan			
2016-10-30	Loss	(Japan) Ryoga Terayama	NJKF Explosion 7	Tokyo, Japan	Decision	2	1:30
2016-10-02	Win	(Japan) Ryogo Komiyama	MuayThaiOpen 36 Lumpinee Boxing Stadium of Japan	Tokyo, Japan	Decision (unanimous)	3	2:00
2016-09-25	Win	(Japan) Kira Okamatsu	WMPF Amateur 88	Tokyo, Japan			
2016-09-04	Win	(Japan) Tenma Nagai	JAKF SMASHERS 183	Tokyo, Japan	Decision (unanimous)	3	1:30
Wins JAKF SMASHERS -40kg title.
2016-08-28	Win	(Japan) Aliyakare Yamamoto	NJKF Explosion 6	Tokyo, Japan	Decision	2	1:30
2016-08-28	Win	(Japan) Jinto Tokoro	NJKF Explosion 6	Tokyo, Japan	Decision	2	1:30
2016-07-23	Loss	(Japan) Shunpei Kitano	2nd WBC Muay Thai Jr League Tournament, Final	Tokyo, Japan	Decision	2	1:30
For the 2016 WBC Muay Thai Jr League Middle School -34kg title.
2016-07-23	Win	(Japan) Luke Kondo	2nd WBC Muay Thai Jr League Tournament, Semi-final	Tokyo, Japan	Decision	2	1:30
2016-07-17	Win	(Japan) Ryogo Komiyama	MuayThaiOpen	Tokyo, Japan	Decision		
2016-05-22	Win	(Japan) Tatsuki Shimizu	JAKF SMASHERS 181	Tokyo, Japan	Decision (unanimous)		
2016-05-22	Win	(Japan) Luke Kondo	JAKF SMASHERS 180	Tokyo, Japan	Decision (unanimous)		
2016-05-22	Win	(Japan) Jinto Tokoro	JAKF SMASHERS 180	Tokyo, Japan	Decision (unanimous)		
2016-05-15	Win	(Japan) Shota Noda	NJKF Explosion 5, inaugural -37 kg Championship Tournament, Final	Tokyo, Japan	Decision	2	1:30
Wins inaugural NJKF Explosion -37kg title.
2016-05-15	Win	(Japan) Yuki Baba	NJKF Explosion 5, inaugural -37 kg Championship Tournament, Semi-final	Tokyo, Japan	Decision	2	1:30
2016-04-29	Win	(Japan) Shoma Ozaki	JAKF SMASHERS 179	Tokyo, Japan	Decision (unanimous)	2	1:30
2016-04-03	Win	(Japan) Hyouga	REBELS Blow Cup Tournament -40 kg, Final	Tokyo, Japan	Decision (unanimous)		
Wins Blow Cup 43 Tournament -40kg title.
2016-04-03	Win	(Japan) Uyama	REBELS Blow Cup Tournament -40 kg, Semi-final	Tokyo, Japan	Forfeit		
2016-04-03	Win	(Japan) Riku Otsu	REBELS Blow Cup Tournament -40 kg, Quarter-final	Tokyo, Japan	KO	1	0:37
2016-03-29	Win	(Japan) Shoma Ozaki	SMASHERS 179	Tokyo, Japan	Decision (unanimous)	2	1:30
2016-03-20	Win	(Japan) Sho Osano	SMASHERS 178	Tokyo, Japan	Decision (unanimous)	2	1:30
2016-03-13	Win	(Japan) Ryogo Komiyama	Muay Thai Super Fight Suk Wan Kingtong - Real Champion Tournament Final	Tokyo, Japan	Decision		
Wins Real Champion Tournament -38kg title.
2016-02-14	Win	(Japan) Jinto Tokoro	WMPF Amateur 83	Tokyo, Japan	Decision		
2015-12-20	Win	(Japan) Shimon Yoshinari	Suk Wan Kingthong, Real Champion Tournament 34 kg Final	Tokyo, Japan	Decision		
2015-12-20	Win	(Japan) Taichi Shirakawa	Suk Wan Kingthong, Real Champion Tournament 34 kg Semi-final	Tokyo, Japan	Decision		
2015-12-13	Win	(Japan)	MuayThaiOpen 33	Tokyo, Japan			
Defends MuayThaiOpen Amateur -35kg title.
2015-12-12	Win	(Japan) Wataru Hiramatsu	JAKF "SMASHERS Champion's Carnival 2015"	Tokyo, Japan	Decision (unanimous)	2	1:30
Wins All Japan SMASHERS -35kg title.
2015-12-06	Win	(Japan) Miyu Sasaki	8th National Junior Kick	Tokyo, Japan	Decision (unanimous)		
2015-11-08	Win	(Japan) Shota Noda	WPMF Amateur 81	Tokyo, Japan	Decision		
2015-11-01	Draw	(Japan) Shota Noda	NJKF Explosion	Tokyo, Japan	Decision	2	1:30
2015-10-18	Win	(Japan) Raigo Miyazaki	SMASHERS 176	Tokyo, Japan	Decision (unanimous)	2	1:30
2015-09-27	Win	(Japan)	MuayThaiOpen 32	Tokyo, Japan			
Wins MuayThaiOpen Amateur -35kg title.
2015-09-20	Loss	(Japan) Konosuke Nakamura	KAMINARIMON All Japan Tournament, Semi-finals	Tokyo, Japan	Decision (unanimous)	1	2:00
2015-09-20	Win	(Japan) Toki Oshika	KAMINARIMON All Japan Tournament, Quarter-finals	Tokyo, Japan	Decision (unanimous)	1	2:00
2015-08-30	Loss	(Japan) Daiya Kira	1st WBC Muay Thai Jr League, All Japan Tournament Final	Tokyo, Japan	Decision		
For the 2015 WBC Muay Thai Jr League All Japan -34kg title.
2015-08-30	Win	(Japan) Shota Noda	1st WBC Muay Thai Jr League, All Japan Tournament Semi-final	Tokyo, Japan	Decision		
2015-08-09	Win	(Japan) Aliya Yamamoto	BRAVE 27	Tokyo, Japan	Decision (unanimous)		
2015-08-09	Win	(Japan) Atsuya Sato	BRAVE 27	Tokyo, Japan	Decision (majority)		
2015-08-02	Loss	(Japan) Ryogo Komiyama	Suk Wan Kingthong, Real Champion Tournament 34 kg Final	Tokyo, Japan	Decision	2	1:30
2015-08-02	Win	(Japan) Shimon Yoshinari	Suk Wan Kingthong, Real Champion Tournament 34 kg Semi-final	Tokyo, Japan	Decision	2	1:30
2015-07-19	Win	(Japan) Aliyakare Yamamoto	JAKF SMASHERS 175, Final	Tokyo, Japan	Decision	2	2:00
2015-07-19	Win	(Japan) Wataru Hiramatsu	JAKF SMASHERS 175, Semi-final	Tokyo, Japan	Decision	2	2:00
2015-07-05	Loss	(Japan) Shota Noda	NJKF Explosion	Tokyo, Japan	Decision	2	1:30
2015-06-14	Win	(Japan) Yosuke Sekibara	SMASHERS 174	Tokyo, Japan	Decision (unanimous)	2	1:30
2015-04-29	Win	(Japan) Taiji Shirakawa	NJKF Explosion	Tokyo, Japan	Decision	2	1:30
2015-04-29	Win	(Japan) Ryoga Terayama	NJKF Explosion	Tokyo, Japan	Decision	2	1:30
2015-04-19	Win	(Japan) Rui Ookubo	SMASHERS Wings	Tokyo, Japan	Decision (unanimous)		
2015-03-15	Win	(Japan) Rui Yamaguchi	4th All Japan Jr. Kick -30 kg Tournament, Final	Tokyo, Japan	Decision (unanimous)	3	
Wins 2015 All Japan Jr Kick -30kg title.
2015-03-15	Win	(Japan)	4th All Japan Jr. Kick -30 kg Tournament, Semi-final	Tokyo, Japan	Decision		
2015-03-15	Win	(Japan)	4th All Japan Jr. Kick -30 kg Tournament, Quarter-final	Tokyo, Japan	Decision		
2015-02-22	Loss	(Japan) Ryogo Komiyama	4th All Japan Jr. Kick Kanto -30 kg Tournament, Final	Tokyo, Japan	Decision		
2015-02-08	Win	(Japan) Taichi Shirakawa	WPMF Amateur 75, -30 kg Tournament Final	Tokyo, Japan			
Wins WPMF Amateur -30kg title.
2015-02-08	Win	(Japan) Ryugo Hori	WPMF Amateur 75, -30 kg Tournament Semi-final	Tokyo, Japan			
2014-12-21	Win	(Japan) Shimon Yoshinari	WINDY SPORTS	Tokyo, Japan	Decision	5	
Wins WINDY SPORTS Muay Thai -30kg title.
2014-11-30	Win	(Japan) Shoma	TENKAICHI Fight	Tokyo, Japan	TKO	1	0:55
2014-10-13	Win	(Japan) Maiku Tanaka	MUAYTHAI WINDY SUPER FIGHT vol.18 in Kyoto	Kyoto, Japan	Decision (unanimous)	2	2:00
2014-10-19	Loss	(Japan) Tenma	WPMF BOM Amateur	Kanagawa, Japan	Decision	2	2:00
2014-07-06	Win	(Japan) Tenma	BOM Amateur 7, -30 kg Tournament Final	Tokyo, Japan	Decision		
2014-07-06	Win	(Japan) Raize Umemoto	BOM Amateur 7, -30 kg Tournament Semi-final	Tokyo, Japan	Decision		
2014-06-29	Win	(Japan) Haruyuki Tanitsu	Muay Thai WINDY Super Fight vol.16	Tokyo, Japan	Decision	2	2:00
2014-05-06	Win	(Japan) Shimon Yoshinari	The Battle of Muay Thai Amateur 6	Tokyo, Japan	Decision	3	2:00
Wins the BOM -28.5kg title.
2014-01-19	Win	(Japan) Shota Noda	BOM Amateur 4, Final	Kanagawa, Japan	Decision	2	2:00
2014-01-19	Win	(Japan) Shimon Yoshinari	BOM Amateur 4, Semi-final	Kanagawa, Japan	Decision	2	2:00
Legend: Win Loss Draw/no contest Notes

== See also ==
- List of male kickboxers
