= Ryoga Terayama =

Japanese kickboxer (born 2004)

- Born: 寺山遼冴; January 19, 2004 (age 22); Gunma Prefecture, Japan
- Height: 173 cm (5 ft 8 in)
- Weight: 53 kg (117 lb; 8.3 st)
- Style: Kickboxing
- Stance: Southpaw
- Fighting out of: Chiba, Japan
- Team: ARK FIGHT GYM (2025 - Present); Team TEPPEN (2019-2022)
- Trainer: Hiroyuki Nasukawa
- Years active: 2019-present

Kickboxing record
- Total: 22
- Wins: 14
- By knockout: 3
- Losses: 4
- By knockout: 1
- Draws: 4

Other information
- Notable relatives: Hinata Terayama (sister)

Ryoga Terayama (born 19 January 2004) is a Japanese kickboxer, currently competing in the bantamweight division of RISE.

As of August 2021 he was the #10 ranked Strawweight kickboxer in the world by Combat Press.

== Kickboxing career ==
Terayama made his professional debut against Ryo Miyakawa at RISE 135 on November 4, 2019. He won the fight by unanimous decision, with all three judges scoring the fight 30–27 in his favor.

Terayama was scheduled to face Shoa Arii at Stand Up Kickboxing vol.1 on December 22, 2019. The fight was ruled a draw by unanimous decision, with all three judges scoring the fight as 29–29.

Terayama was scheduled to face Naoya Kuroda at RISE 137 on February 23, 2020. The fight was ruled a majority draw, with one of the three judges scoring the fight in Terayama's favor.

Terayama was scheduled to make his promotional debut with DEEP KICK against Yuma at DEEP KICK 44 on July 26, 2020. He won the fight by a second-round technical knockout, stopping his opponent in the very last second of the round. He was afterwards scheduled to fight HΛL, for the DEEP KICK -53 kg title, at DEEP KICK 47 on September 21, 2020. Terayama won the fight by unanimous decision. He thoroughly dominated his opponent and was accordingly awarded wide scorecards of 30–25, 30–26 and 30–26.

Terayama returned to RISE for his next fight. He was scheduled to fight a rematch with Shoa Arii at RISE Dead or Alive Osaka on November 1, 2020. Arii won the closely contested fight by majority decision, with scores of 30–29, 29–29 and 30–29.

Terayama was scheduled to fight the veteran Yuki Kyotani at RISE 149 on May 23, 2021. The fight was ruled a draw, after an extension round was fought.

Terayama participated in the Shooto 53 kg Cage Kick tournament, held at Shooto 2021 Vol.4 on July 4, 2021. He was scheduled to face Keito Naito in the tournament quarterfinals. He won the fight by unanimous decision. Terayama won the semifinal bout against Kanta Tabuchi in the same manner. Terayama fought a trilogy bout with Shoa Arii in the tournament finals. He won their third meeting by split decision, after an extension round was fought.

Terayama was scheduled to make his first title defense against the #3 ranked DEEP KICK contender Yuma at DEEP☆KICK 56 on September 23, 2021. The two previously fought at DEEP KICK 44 on July 26, 2020, with Terayama winning their first meeting by a second-round technical knockout. Terayama won the fight by a dominant decision, with all three judges awarding him a 30-25 scorecard.

Terayama faced Hiroki at Rizin 32 - Okinawa on November 20, 2021. He won the bout via unanimous decision.

Terayama was scheduled to face Takuya at RISE 154 on January 23, 2022. Terayama was later forced to withdraw, due to a close contact with a COVID-19 infected person.

On February 15, 2022, Terayama announced his departure from the Teppen gym. Terayama was booked to face Kyosuke at RISE 162 on October 30, 2022, and prepared for it as the BeWell gym. He won the fight by unanimous decision.

Terayama faced Koki Osaki in the main event of RISE 165: RISE 20th Memorial event on February 23, 2923. Terayama suffered an inadvertent low blow at the 1:54 minute mark of the third round, which left him unable to continue competing. The fight was ruled a draw by technical decision. They face each other in an immediate rematch at RISE 168 on May 28, 2023. He lost the fight by a second-round technical knockout.

Terayama faced Knight Makino at RISE 178 on May 19, 2024. He won the fight by unanimous decision.

Terayama faced King Ryuzo at RISE 183 on November 23, 2024. He won the fight by a third-round technical knockout.

== Titles and accomplishments ==
Professional

- DEEP KICK
  - 2020 DEEP KICK -53 kg Champion
- Shooto
  - 2021 Shooto Cage Kick Championship Tournament Winner

Amateur

- BigBang
  - 2014 Bigbang -28 kg Champion
  - 2017 Bigbang -40 kg Champion
  - 2017 Bigbang -45 kg Champion
  - 2018 Bigbang -50 kg Champion
- J-Grow
  - 2014 J-GROW Jr League Tournament Winner
- SMASHERS
  - 2015 SMASHERS -30 kg Champion
- RISE
  - 2016 KAMINARIMON All Japan -40 kg Champion
  - 2018 KAMINARIMON All Japan -55 kg Champion
- Shin Karate
  - 2017 Dageki Kakutougi Japan Cup Middle School -45 kg Runner-up
- J-NETWORK
  - 2018 J-NETWORK All Japan Middle School -50 kg Champion
- World Boxing Council Muaythai
  - 2018 WBC Muay Thai All Japan Jr. League -50 kg Runner-up

== Fight record ==
Kickboxing record
14 Wins (3 (T)KO's), 4 Losses, 4 Draws
Date	Result	Opponent	Event	Location	Method	Round	Time
2026-05-17	Win	(Japan) Sota	Bigbang 56	Tokyo, Japan	Decision (Majority)	3	3:00
2026-03-20	Win	(Armenia) Narek Khachikyan	ONE Friday Fights 147	Bangkok, Thailand	KO (Punches)	2	2:59
2025-12-14	Win	(Japan) Retsu Sashida	RISE 194	Tokyo, Japan	Decision (Unanimous)	3	3:00
2025-06-29	Loss	(Japan) Kosei Yoshida	RISE 189	Tokyo, Japan	Decision (Split)	3	3:00
2025-02-23	Loss	(Japan) Reiji	RISE 186	Tokyo, Japan	Decision (Unanimous)	3	3:00
2024-11-23	Win	(Japan) King Ryuzo	RISE 183	Tokyo, Japan	TKO (3 Knockdowns)	3	2:33
2024-05-19	Win	(Japan) Knight Makino	RISE 178	Tokyo, Japan	Decision (Unanimous)	3	3:00
2023-05-28	Loss	(Japan) Koki Osaki	RISE 168	Tokyo, Japan	TKO (3 Knockdowns)	2	1:56
2023-02-23	Draw	(Japan) Koki Osaki	RISE 165: RISE 20th Memorial event	Tokyo, Japan	Tech. Decision (Majority)	3	
2022-10-30	Win	(Japan) Kyosuke	RISE 162	Tokyo, Japan	Decision (Unanimous)	3	3:00
2021-11-20	Win	(Japan) Hiroki	Rizin 32 - Okinawa	Okinawa, Japan	Decision (Unanimous)	3	3:00
2021-09-23	Win	(Japan) Yuma	DEEP☆KICK 56	Izumiōtsu, Japan	Decision (Unanimous)	3	3:00
Defends the DEEP KICK -53kg title.
2021-07-04	Win	(Japan) Shoa Arii	Shooto 2021 Vol.4 – Cage Kick Championship, Final	Osaka, Japan	Ext.R Decision (Split)	4	3:00
Wins Cage Kick Championship Tournament title.
2021-07-04	Win	(Japan) Kanta Tabuchi	Shooto 2021 Vol.4 – Cage Kick Championship, Semi Final	Osaka, Japan	Decision (Unanimous)	3	3:00
2021-07-04	Win	(Japan) Keito Naito	Shooto 2021 Vol.4 – Cage Kick Championship, Quarter Final	Osaka, Japan	Decision (Unanimous)	3	3:00
2021-05-23	Draw	(Japan) Yuki Kyotani	RISE 149	Tokyo, Japan	Ext.R Decision (Unanimous)	4	3:00
2020-11-01	Loss	(Japan) Shoa Arii	RISE Dead or Alive Osaka	Osaka, Japan	Decision (Majority)	3	3:00
2020-09-21	Win	(Japan) HΛL	DEEP KICK 47	Osaka, Japan	Decision (Unanimous)	3	3:00
Wins DEEP KICK -53kg title.
2020-07-26	Win	(Japan) Yuma	DEEP KICK 44	Osaka, Japan	TKO (Punches)	2	2:59
2020-02-23	Draw	(Japan) Naoya Kuroda	RISE 137	Tokyo, Japan	Decision (Majority)	3	3:00
2019-12-22	Draw	(Japan) Shoa Arii	Stand Up Kickboxing vol.1	Tokyo, Japan	Decision (Unanimous)	3	3:00
2019-11-04	Win	(Japan) Ryo Miyakawa	RISE 135	Osaka, Japan	Decision (Unanimous)	3	3:00
Legend: Win Loss Draw/No contest Notes

=== Amateur record ===
Amateur Kickboxing Record
Date	Result	Opponent	Event	Location	Method	Round	Time
2019-06-02	Win	(Japan) Touma Ogura	KAMINARIMON	Tokyo, Japan	Decision (Unanimous)	2	2:00
2019-04-14	Win	(Japan) Ryo Miyakawa	KAMINARIMON	Tokyo, Japan	Decision (Unanimous)	2	2:00
2019-04-14	Win	(Japan) Yasuhiko Nemoto	KAMINARIMON	Tokyo, Japan	Decision (Unanimous)	2	2:00
2018-12-02	Win	(Japan) Ryuto Kimura	KAMINARIMON All Japan Tournament -55 kg Final	Tokyo, Japan	Decision (Unanimous)	2	2:00
Wins KAMINARIMON All Japan -55kg title.
2018-12-02	Win	(Japan) Towa Yamaguchi	KAMINARIMON All Japan Tournament -55 kg Semi Final	Tokyo, Japan	Decision (Split)	2	2:00
2018-10-21	Win	(Japan) Shoma Ozaki	KAMINARIMON	Tokyo, Japan	Decision (Unanimous)	2	2:00
2018-10-21	Win	(Japan) Kousei Kanai	KAMINARIMON	Tokyo, Japan	KO	2	
2018-08-05	Loss	(Japan) Ryu Hanaoka	WBC Muay Thai All Japan Junior League, Final	Tokyo, Japan	Decision	2	1:30
For the All Japan WBC Muay Thai Jr league Middle School -50kg title.
2018-08-05	Win	(Japan) Sora Funamoto	WBC Muay Thai All Japan Junior League, Semi Final	Tokyo, Japan	Decision	2	1:30
2018-07-08	Loss	(Japan) Ryu Hanaoka	NJKF Explosion 16, WBC Muay Thai Jr League Selection Tournament, Final	Tokyo, Japan	Decision	2	1:30
2018-05-27	Win	(Japan) Eiji Katsura	J-NETWORK All Japan Tournament Middle School -50 kg Final	Tokyo, Japan	Decision (Majority)	2	2:00
Wins J-NETWORK All Japan Middle School -50kg title.
2018-05-27	Win	(Japan) Ritsuki Shibasawa	J-NETWORK All Japan Tournament Middle School -50 kg Semi Final	Tokyo, Japan	KO	1	1:54
2017-10-09	Loss	(Japan) Riku Kazushima	Amateur Dageki Kakutougi Japan Cup 2017, Final	Tokyo, Japan	Decision (Unanimous)	2	1:30
For the 2017 Japan Cup Middle School -45kg title.
2017-10-09	Win	(Japan)	Amateur Dageki Kakutougi Japan Cup 2017, Semi Final	Tokyo, Japan	Decision	1	2:00
2017-10-09	Win	(Japan) Ryunosuke Saito	Amateur Dageki Kakutougi Japan Cup 2017, Quarter Final	Tokyo, Japan	Decision	1	2:00
2017-09-03	Win	(Japan) Jinto Tokoro	Bigbang Amateur 42	Tokyo, Japan	Decision	3	1:30
Defends Bigbang -45kg title.
2017-07-09	Win	(Japan) Eiji Katsura	Bigbang Amateur 41	Tokyo, Japan	Decision	3	1:30
Wins Bigbang -45kg title.
2017-06-25	Draw	(Japan) Ryugo Komiyama	J-FIGHT 2017～J-NETWORK 20th Anniversary～2nd	Tokyo, Japan	Decision	2	2:00
2017-06-04	Win	(Japan) Tenma Nagai	Bigbang Amateur 40	Tokyo, Japan	Decision (Majority)	2	1:30
2017-06-04	Win	(Japan) Ren Ogawa	Bigbang Amateur 40	Tokyo, Japan	Decision (Unanimous)	2	1:30
2017-05-28	Win	(Japan) Riku Otsu	J-FIGHT＆J-GIRLS 2017～J-NETWORK 20th Anniversary～3rd	Tokyo, Japan	Decision (Unanimous)	2	2:00
2017-04-16	Loss	(Japan) Akiyuki Tanitsu	NJKF Explosion 10	Japan	Decision	2	1:30
2017-04-02	Win	(Japan) Jinto Tokoro	Bigbang Amateur	Tokyo, Japan	Decision (Unanimous)	3	1:30
Wins Bigbang -40kg title.
2017-03-05	Loss	(Japan) Yusei Shirahata	NJKF Explosion	Japan	Ext.R Decision	4	1:30
2017-02-26	Win	(Japan) Toki Ōshika	KAMINARIMON	Tokyo, Japan	Decision (Unanimous)	2	2:00
2016-12-11	Win	(Japan) Kouga Kitakuni	KAMINARIMON All Japan -40 kg Tournament Final	Tokyo, Japan	Decision (Unanimous)	2	2:00
Wins KAMINARIMON All Japan -40kg title.
2016-12-11	Win	(Japan) Ryu Hanaoka	KAMINARIMON All Japan Tournament -40 kg Semi Final	Tokyo, Japan	Decision (Split)	2	2:00
2016-09-04	Win	(Japan) Keishin Watanabe	Bigbang Amateur 36	Tokyo, Japan	Decision (Unanimous)	2	1:30
2016-07-10	Win	(Japan) Taiju Nozaki	Bigbang Amateur 35	Tokyo, Japan	KO	1	
2016-04-29	Loss	(Japan) Jinto Tokoro	JAKF SMASHERS 179	Tokyo, Japan	Decision (Unanimous)		
For the SMASHERS -35kg title.
2016-03-20	Win	(Japan) Keishin Watanabe	JAKF SMASHERS 178, Final	Tokyo, Japan	Decision (Unanimous)	2	1:30
2016-03-20	Win	(Japan) Ryoma Wakatsuki	JAKF SMASHERS 178, Semi Final	Tokyo, Japan	Decision (Unanimous)	2	1:30
2016-02-28	Win	(Japan) Toki Ōshika	KAMINARIMON	Tokyo, Japan	Decision (Unanimous)	2	2:00
2016-02-21	Win	(Japan) Rui Sugiyama	Bigbang Amateur 32	Tokyo, Japan	Decision (Unanimous)	2	2:00
2016-02-21	Win	(Japan) Narumi Hen	Bigbang Amateur 32	Tokyo, Japan	Decision (Unanimous)	2	2:00
2016-02-07	Win	(Japan) Raize Umemoto	NJKF EXPLOSION 4	Tokyo, Japan	Decision	2	1:30
2015-12-06	Loss	(Japan) Jinto Tokoro	Bigbang Amateur 31	Tokyo, Japan	Decision	2	2:00
2015-07-19	Loss	(Japan) Ryocihi Sato	JAKF 175	Tokyo, Japan	Decision	2	2:00
2015-06-14	Draw	(Japan) Aliyakare Yamamoto	JAKF SMASHERS 174	Tokyo, Japan	Decision	2	1:30
2015-06-07	Draw	(Japan) Shimon Yoshinari	Bigbang Amateur 25	Tokyo, Japan	Decision	2	1:30
2015-05-10	Win	(Japan) Shura Shigihara	Bigbang Amateur 28	Tokyo, Japan	Decision	2	1:30
2015-04-29	Loss	(Japan) Ryu Hanaoka	NJKF Explosion	Tokyo, Japan	Decision	2	1:30
2015-03-29	Loss	(Japan) Akiyuki Tanitsu	Bigbang Amateur 27	Tokyo, Japan	Decision (Unanimous)	2	1:30
2015-03-22	Win	(Japan) Taisuke Yamada	JAKF SMASHERS 170	Tokyo, Japan	TKO	2	
Wins SMASHERS -30kg title.
2015-02-15	Loss	(Japan) Jinto Tokoro	Bigbang Amateur 26	Tokyo, Japan	Decision	3	1:30
For the Bigbang Amateur -31kg title.
2014-12-13	Loss	(Japan)	JAKF SMASHERS Tournament, Semi Final	Tokyo, Japan	Decision		
2014-12-13	Win	(Japan)	JAKF SMASHERS Tournament, Quarter Final	Tokyo, Japan	Decision		
2014-12-07	Win	(Japan) Ryohei Watanabe	Bigbang Amateur 25	Tokyo, Japan	Decision	3	1:30
Defends Bigbang Amateur -28kg title.
2014-11-30	Win	(Japan) Shibasawa	TENKAICHI Fight	Tokyo, Japan	Decision (Unanimous)	2	2:00
2014-09-07	Win	(Japan) Shota Ide	Bigbang Amateur 23	Tokyo, Japan	Ext.R Decision	3	1:30
Wins Bigbang Amateur -28kg title.
2014-08-24	Win	(Japan) Sora Mochizuki	J-GROW 44～Oomori Survival 2014～, Final	Tokyo, Japan	KO	1	
2014-08-24	Win	(Japan) Shota Torigoe	J-GROW 44～Oomori Survival 2014～, Semi Final	Tokyo, Japan	KO	1	
2014-06-22	Draw	(Japan) Shota Torigoe	J-GROW in SHINJUKU～vol.4～	Tokyo, Japan	Decision	2	1:30
2014-06-01	Win	(Japan) Takuma Urata	Bigbang Amateur 21	Tokyo, Japan	Decision		
Legend: Win Loss Draw/No contest Notes

== See also ==
- List of male kickboxers
