= Momu Tsukamoto =

Japanese kickboxer

- Born: 塚本 望夢; October 6, 2005 (age 21); Kakogawa, Japan
- Other names: Heavenly Kick Kid
- Height: 164 cm (5 ft 5 in)
- Weight: 53 kg (117 lb; 8.3 st)
- Style: Kickboxing
- Stance: Orthodox
- Fighting out of: Kakogawa, Hyōgo, Japan
- Team: Team Bonds
- Years active: 2021—present

Kickboxing record
- Total: 22
- Wins: 15
- By knockout: 6
- Losses: 7
- By knockout: 4

Momu Tsukamoto (Japanese: 塚本 望夢, Tsukamoto Momu; born October 6, 2005) is a Japanese kickboxer, currently competing in the RISE promotion.

As of June 2025, he was the #9 ranked -53 kg kickboxer in the world according to Beyond Kickboxing.

== Kickboxing career ==
=== DEEP KICK ===
Tsukamoto took part in a one-day DEEP KICK flyweight tournament held at DEEP☆KICK 55 on September 23, 2021. He captured the tournament title with unanimous decision victories over Taisei in the semifinals and Toya Matsuba in the finals, who he knocked down once with a superman punch in the opening round.

Tsukamoto faced Yoshiki Tane in the semifinals of the DEEP KICK flyweight tournament, held to crown the inaugural champion, at DEEP☆KICK 57 on November 28, 2021. The pair fought on two previous occasions as amateurs, with each fighter winning once. Tsukamoto proved the more successful fighter in their first encounter as professionals, as he was able to knock him down three times in the opening round to win the fight by technical knockout. Tsukamoto faced the once-defeated Ryuta Suekuni in the tournament finals, held at DEEP☆KICK 60 on March 13, 2022. He knocked Suekuni down once in the opening round en route to winning the fight by unanimous decision.

=== RISE ===
On April 22, 2022, Tsukamoto entered a multi event 4-man tournament for the inaugural RISE Flyweight (51.5 kg) title. He faced Riku Kazushima at RISE 157 as a semifinal bout. Kazushima won the fight by majority decision in a bout where both fighters received an 8 count.

Tsukamoto faced King Tsubasa at RISE WORLD SERIES OSAKA 2022 on August 21, 2022. He won the fight by unanimous decision, with scores of 30–28, 30—27 and 30–27.

Tsukamoto faced Songchainoi Kiatsongrit at NJKF West 4th - 1st Stage on September 25, 2022. He lost the fight by a first-round technical knockout, as he was twice knocked down with a right cross before the referee stopped the bout. It was the first stoppage loss of Tsukamoto's professional career.

Tsukamoto took part in the 2023 RISE New Warriors Flyweight (-51.5 kg) tournament, held at RISE 166: RISE 20th Memorial event on February 23, 2023. He overcame his semifinal opponent Ryujin Nasukawa by unanimous decision, with all three ringside officials awarding him a 30—29 scorecard. Tsukamoto faced Tenshi Matsumoto in the finals of the one-day tournament. He lost the fight by a third-round technical knockout.

Tsukamoto faced Toshihiro Yamakawa at RISE World Series 2023 - 1st Round on July 2, 2023. He won the fight by a first-round spinning backfight knockout, his first stoppage victory with the promotion.

Tsukamoto faced Yuzuki Sakai, who returned to professional competition following a 15-month absence from the sport, at RISE 172 October 29, 2023. He won the fight by unanimous decision.

Tsukamoto faced Ryujin Nasukawa at RISE WORLD SERIES 2024 OSAKA on June 15, 2024. The fight was announced as a "Next Challenger Bouts", with the winner expected to face the RISE Flyweight (-51.5 kg) champion Riku Kazushima. Tsukamoto lost the fight by split decision.

Tsukamoto faced Dangan Futa at RISE WORLD SERIES 2024 YOKOHAMA on September 8, 2024. He needed just 43 seconds to stop his opponent with a spinning backfist.

Tsukamoto faced Ryoya Ito in an open-finger glove bout at Fight Club 2 on October 5, 2024. He won the fight by unanimous decision.

Tsukamoto faced the RISE Super Flyweight (-53 kg) champion Ryu Hanaoka in a non-title bout at RISE WORLD SERIES 2025 Tokyo on August 2, 2025. He lost the fight by a second-round technical knockout.

== Titles and accomplishments ==
=== Amateur ===
- All Japan Jr Kick
  - 2014 All Japan Jr Kick -25 kg Runner-up
- World Boxing Council Muay Thai
  - 2015 WBC Muay Thai All Japan Jr League Elementary School -28 kg Runner-up
- DEEP KICK
  - 2013 NEXT LEVEL Chushikoku -25 kg Championship
    - One successful title defense
  - 2016 NEXT LEVEL Chushikoku -30 kg Championship
  - 2016 SMASHERS -30 kg Championship
  - 2018 NEXT LEVEL Chushikoku -35 kg Championship
  - 2018 NEXT LEVEL Chushikoku -40 kg Championship
    - One successful title defense
  - 2019 NEXT LEVEL All Japan -45 kg Championship
  - 2020 NEXT LEVEL Chushikoku -45 kg Championship
  - 2020 NEXT LEVEL All Japan -45 kg Championship

=== Professional ===
- DEEP KICK
  - 2021 DEEP KICK -51 kg Freshman 1-Day Tournament Winner
  - 2022 DEEP KICK -51 kg Championship

== Fight record ==
Professional Kickboxing record
15 Wins (6 (T)KO's), 7 Losses, 0 Draw, 0 No Contest
Date	Result	Opponent	Event	Location	Method	Round	Time
2026-09-19	Loss	(Japan) Tenshi Matsumoto	RISE World Series 2026 Tokyo 2	Tokyo, Japan	TKO (3 knockdowns)	2	2:30
For the RISE Flyweight (-51.5 kg) title.
2026-04-26	Win	(Japan) Ryunosuke Ito	RISE 197	Tokyo, Japan	KO (punches)	1	1:05
2025-11-30	Win	(South Korea) Lee Jae Uk	Re:Origin Tottori vol.1	Kurayoshi, Tottori, Japan	KO (body kick)	1	
2025-11-02	Loss	(Japan) Tenshi Matsumoto	RISE World Series 2025 Final	Tokyo, Japan	Decision (majority)	3	3:00
2025-08-02	Loss	(Japan) Ryu Hanaoka	RISE WORLD SERIES 2025 Tokyo	Tokyo, Japan	TKO (punches)	2	1:53
2024-10-05	Win	(Japan) Ryoya Ito	RISE Fight Club 2	Tokyo, Japan	Decision (unanimous)	3	3:00
2024-09-08	Win	(Japan) Dangan Futa	RISE WORLD SERIES 2024 YOKOHAMA	Yokohama, Japan	KO (spinning backfist)	1	0:43
2024-06-15	Loss	(Japan) Ryujin Nasukawa	RISE WORLD SERIES 2024 OSAKA	Osaka, Japan	Decision (split)	3	3:00
2024-02-23	Win	(Japan) Jin	RISE 176	Tokyo, Japan	Decision (unanimous)	3	3:00
2023-10-29	Win	(Japan) Yuzuki Sakai	RISE 172	Tokyo, Japan	Decision (unanimous)	3	3:00
2023-07-02	Win	(Japan) Toshihiro Yamakawa	RISE World Series 2023 - 1st Round	Osaka, Japan	KO (spinning back fist)	1	2:18
2023-02-23	Loss	(Japan) Tenshi Matsumoto	RISE 166: RISE 20th Memorial event - New Warriors Tournament, Final	Tokyo, Japan	TKO (referee stoppage)	3	0:46
For the 2023 RISE New Warriors -51.5kg Tournament title.
2023-02-23	Win	(Japan) Ryujin Nasukawa	RISE 166: RISE 20th Memorial event - New Warriors Tournament, Semi Final	Tokyo, Japan	Decision (unanimous)	3	3:00
2022-09-25	Loss	(Thailand) Songchainoi Kiatsongrit	NJKF West 4th - 1st Stage	Osaka, Japan	KO (right cross)	1	1:36
2022-08-21	Win	(Japan) King Tsubasa	RISE WORLD SERIES OSAKA 2022	Osaka, Japan	Decision (unanimous)	3	3:00
2022-04-24	Loss	(Japan) Riku Kazushima	RISE 157 - Flyweight Championship Tournament, Semi Final	Tokyo, Japan	Decision (majority)	3	3:00
2022-03-13	Win	(Japan) Ryuta Suekuni	DEEP☆KICK 60, -51 kg Championship Tournament Final	Osaka, Japan	Decision (unanimous)	3	3:00
Wins the inaugural DEEP KICK -51kg title.
2022-02-06	Win	(Japan) Daiki Teranishi	NJKF 2022 West 1st	Osaka, Japan	KO (flying knee)	1	
2021-11-28	Win	(Japan) Yoshiki Tane	DEEP☆KICK 57, -51 kg Championship Tournament Semi Final	Osaka, Japan	TKO (3 knockdowns)	1	1:55
2021-09-23	Win	(Japan) Toya Matsuba	DEEP☆KICK 55, Freshman Tournament Final	Izumiōtsu, Japan	Decision (unanimous)	3	2:00
Wins the DEEP KICK -51kg Freshman 1-Day Tournament title.
2021-09-23	Win	(Japan) Taisei	DEEP☆KICK 55, Freshman Tournament Semi Final	Izumiōtsu, Japan	Decision (unanimous)	3	2:00
2021-07-04	Win	(Japan) Toya Matsuba	DEEP☆KICK 53	Osaka, Japan	Decision (unanimous)	3	3:00
Legend: Win Loss Draw/No contest Notes

=== Amateur record ===
Amateur Kickboxing record
Date	Result	Opponent	Event	Location	Method	Round	Time
2021-03-07	Win	(Japan) Kokoro Wakahara	KROSSxOVER 11	Tokyo, Japan	KO (jumping knee)	2	
2021-02-21	Win	(Japan) Naoki Okada	NJKF 2021 west 1st	Tokyo, Japan	Decision (unanimous)	3	1:30
2020-12-13	Win	(Japan) Ryujin Nasukawa	DEEP KICK 48-49	Osaka, Japan	Decision (unanimous)	3	1:30
2020-09-21	Win	(Japan) Tensuke Yamazaki	DEEP☆KICK 46･47 - 6th Junior All Japan Unification	Izumiōtsu, Japan	Decision (unanimous)	3	1:30
Wins NEXT LEVEL All Japan -45kg title.
2020-02-23	Win	(Japan) Rui Kakizaki	KROSS×OVER 8	Saitama, Japan	Decision (unanimous)	2	2:00
2020-02-16	Win	(Japan) Kojiro Shiba	NEXT☆LEVEL Chushikoku 36	Kurashiki, Japan	Decision (split)	3	1:30
Wins NEXT LEVEL Chushikoku -45kg title.
2019-12-15	Win	(Japan) Toki Harada	NEXT☆LEVEL Chushikoku 35 - 5th Junior All Japan Unification	Izumiōtsu, Japan	Decision (majority)	3	1:30
Wins NEXT LEVEL All Japan -45kg title.
2019-08-01	Loss	(Thailand)		Thailand	Decision	5	
2019-07-07	Win	(Japan) Yujin Nagasu	KROSS×OVER 6	Saitama, Japan	Decision (unanimous)	2	2:00
2019-06-09	Win	(Thailand)		Thailand	KO	3	
2019-05-26	Win	(Japan) Sosuke Aomatsu	NEXT☆LEVEL Chushikoku 33	Kurashiki, Japan	Decision (split)	3	1:30
Defends NEXT LEVEL Chushikoku -40kg title.
2019-04-07	Loss	(Japan) Sento Ito	DEEP KICK 39 - 4th Junior All Japan Unification	Izumiōtsu, Japan	TKO	3	1:22
For the NEXT LEVEL All Japan -40kg title.
2019-02-03	Loss	(Japan) Kojiro Toge	NEXT☆LEVEL Chushikoku 32	Kurashiki, Japan	Decision (split)	2	2:00
2018-11-18	Loss	(Japan) Sento Ito	NEXT LEVEL Chushikoku 31 - 3rd Junior All Japan Unification	Kurashiki, Japan	KO	1	
For the NEXT LEVEL All Japan -40kg title.
2018-10-07	Win	(Japan) Ukyo Oeda	NEXT☆LEVEL Chushikoku 30	Kurashiki, Japan	Decision (unanimous)	3	1:30
Wins NEXT LEVEL Chushikoku -40kg title.
2018-06-24	Win	(Japan) Haruto Tsunashima	NEXT☆LEVEL Chushikoku 29	Kurashiki, Japan	Decision (unanimous)	2	2:00
2018-05-27	Loss	(Japan) Sento Ito	NJKF 2018 west 3rd - 2nd Junior All Japan Unification	Takaishi, Japan	Decision (split)	3	1:30
For the NEXT LEVEL All Japan -35kg title.
2018-03-25	Win	(Japan) Kotaro Ikeguchi	NEXT☆LEVEL Chushikoku 28	Kurashiki, Japan	Decision (unanimous)	3	1:30
Wins NEXT LEVEL Chushikoku -35kg title.
2018-03-04	Draw	(Japan) Sora Matsunaga	Kakumei - Chokushin Amateur Kick	Osaka, Japan	Decision	3	1:30
2018-01-14	Loss	(Japan) Sento Ito	NJKF 2018 west 1st	Osaka, Japan	Decision (split)	3	1:00
2017-12-27	Loss	(Japan) Takumi Yoshimura	BORDER KICKBOXING	Osaka, Japan	KO	1	1:51
For the Kakumei Jr -35kg title.
2017-11-14	Win	(Japan) Ryo Ishibashi	Kakumei - Chokushin Amateur Kick	Osaka, Japan	Decision (unanimous)	3	1:30
2017-11-14	Win	(Japan) Masaka Shimizu	Kakumei - Chokushin Amateur Kick	Osaka, Japan	Decision (unanimous)	3	1:30
2017-10-01	Win	(Japan) Satoshi Inada	NEXT☆LEVEL Chushikoku 26	Kurashiki, Japan	Decision (unanimous)	2	2:00
2017-07-09	Loss	(Japan) Ryuki Matsuda	NEXT LEVEL Chushikoku 25	Okayama, Japan	Decision (unanimous)	2	2:00
2017-05-21	Loss	(Japan) Ryuta Suekuni	NEXT☆LEVEL Chushikoku 24	Kurashiki, Japan	Decision (unanimous)	3	1:30
For the NEXT LEVEL Chushikoku -35kg title.
2017-02-26	Win	(Japan) Kosei Yoshida	NEXT☆LEVEL Chushikoku 23	Kurashiki, Japan	Decision (unanimous)	2	2:00
2016-11-13	Win	(Japan) Shintaro Yamazakia	NEXT☆LEVEL Chushikoku 22	Kurashiki, Japan	Decision (unanimous)	3	1:30
Wins NEXT LEVEL Chushikoku -30kg title.
2016-10-09	Win	(Japan) Akito Nakajima	SMASHERS Chugokuchiho 3	Japan	Decision (unanimous)	3	1:30
Wins SMASHERS -30kg title.
2016-08-07	Win	(Japan) Ryusei Ikeguchi	NEXT☆LEVEL Chushikoku 21	Japan	Decision (unanimous)	2	2:00
2016-04-24	Win	(Japan) Eiji Okada	NEXT☆LEVEL Chushikoku 20	Japan	Decision (unanimous)	2	1:30
2016-01-31	Loss	(Japan) Ryuta Suekuni	NEXT☆LEVEL Chushikoku 19	Japan	Decision (unanimous)	3	2:00
For the NEXT LEVEL Chushikoku -30kg title.
2015-08-30	Loss	(Japan) Rui Okubo	All Japan WBC Muay Thai Jr League, Final	Tokyo, Japan	Decision		
For the All Japan WBC Muay Thai Jr League Elementary School -28kg title.
2015-08-02	Win	(Japan) Kazushi Okada	NEXT☆LEVEL Chushikoku 17	Japan	KO	1	
2015-05-24	Loss	(Japan) Kaito Hasegawa	NEXT☆LEVEL Chushikoku 16	Japan	Ext.R Decision (unanimous)	3	1:00
2015-02-22	Win	(Japan) Ryuya Okazaki	NEXT☆LEVEL Chushikoku 15	Japan	Decision (unanimous)	2	2:00
Defends NEXT LEVEL Chushikoku -25kg title.
2014-04-27	Win	(Japan) Ryuya Okazaki	NEXT☆LEVEL Chushikoku 13	Japan	Decision (unanimous)	2	1:00
2014-03-30	Loss	(Japan) Ryuki Matsuda	2014 All Japan Jr Kick, Final	Japan	Decision	2	2:00
For the All Japan Jr Kick -25kg title.
2014-02-23	Loss	(Japan) Ryosuke Hayashi	NEXT☆LEVEL Chushikoku 12	Japan	Decision (unanimous)	2	2:00
For the NEXT LEVEL Chushikoku -30kg title.
2013-10-27	Loss	(Japan) Kaito Hasegawa	NEXT☆LEVEL Chushikoku 11	Japan	Decision (unanimous)	2	1:00
2013-04-21	Win	(Japan) Akinari Yamamoto	NEXT☆LEVEL Chushikoku 10	Japan	Decision (unanimous)	2	2:00
2013-03-31	Loss	(Japan) Kanamu Sakama	All Japan Jr Kick, Semi Final	Japan	Decision	2	1:00
For the All Japan Jr Kick -25kg title.
2013-03-31	Win	(Japan) Aliyakare Yamamoto	All Japan Jr Kick, Quarter Final	Japan	Decision	2	1:00
2013-01-13	Win	(Japan) Nagi Maeda	NEXT☆LEVEL Chushikoku 9	Japan	Decision (unanimous)	2	2:00
Wins NEXT LEVEL Chushikoku -25kg title.
Legend: Win Loss Draw/No contest Notes

== See also ==
- List of male kickboxers
