= Riku Kazushima =

Japanese kickboxer

- Born: 数島大陸; December 28, 2002 (age 23); Osaka, Japan
- Height: 165 cm (5 ft 5 in)
- Weight: 51.5 kg (114 lb; 8.11 st)
- Stance: Southpaw
- Fighting out of: Osaka, Japan
- Team: Oikawa Dojo
- Trainer: Tomohiro Oikawa

Kickboxing record
- Total: 24
- Wins: 16
- By knockout: 8
- Losses: 6
- By knockout: 1
- Draws: 2

Riku Kazushima (数島 大陸, Kazushima Riku; born December 28, 2002) is a Japanese kickboxer. He is the current RISE Flyweight champion.

As of December 2023, he was the #10 ranked Flyweight kickboxer in the world by Beyond Kick.

== Kickboxing career ==
=== Early career ===
Kazushima made his professional debut on September 20, 2020, at RISE EVOL 6 against Rui Kasami. He won the fight by unanimous decision after scoring two knockdowns.

Kazushima faced Daina at HOOST CUP KINGS KYOTO 7 on March 7, 2021. He won the fight by second-round knockout with a left cross.

On June 13, 2021, Kazushima faced Hyuga Umemoto at Stand up vol.2. The fight was declared a majority draw.

On July 28, 2021, Kazushima faced former Rajadamnern Stadium, IBF and WPMF world champion Ryuya Okuwaki at RISE 151. The fight was declared a majority draw despite Kazushima scoring a knockdown in the first round. The fight did not go to an extension round as Kazushima accepted the bout on short notice.

Kazushima suffered his first professional defeat on January 23, 2022, when he lost by unanimous decision to Kuryu at RISE 154.

=== RISE Flyweight Championship ===
On April 22, 2022, Kasushima entered a multi event 4-man tournament for the inaugural RISE Flyweight (51.5 kg) title. He faced Momu Tsukamoto at RISE 157 as a semifinal bout. Kazushima won the fight by majority decision in a bout where both fighters received an 8 count.

Kazushima faced Toki Tamaru for the inaugural RISE Flyweight (-51.5 kg) title at RISE 162 on October 30, 2022. He lost the fight by unanimous decision, with all three judges scoring the bout 49–48.

Kazushima had a second chance at the vacant RISE Flyweight (-51.5 kg) titleTenshi on October 29, 2023, when he faced Tenshi Matsumoto at RISE 172. He won the fight by unanimous decision to take home his first professional title.

Kazushima faced Khunsuk PetchyindeeAcademy at RISE 176 on February 23, 2024. He won the fight by unanimous decision, after an extra fourth round was contested.

Kazushima faced Sudlor SorJor.Tongprachin at RISE WORLD SERIES 2024 OSAKA on June 15, 2024. He won the fight by a third-round knockout.

Kazushima faced the second-ranked RISE flyweight Tenshi Matsumoto at RISE 186 on February 23, 2025. He won the fight by unanimous decision.

== Titles and accomplishments ==
=== Kickboxing ===
Professional

- RISE
  - 2023 RISE Flyweight (-51.5 kg) Champion

Amateur

- 2014 Shootboxing All Japan -30 kg Champion
- 2016 Green Boy Fight Lightweight Champion
- 2016 Suk Wan Kingtong Real Champion Tournament -42 kg Winner
- 2017 Green Boy Fight Welterweight Champion
- 2017 Suk Wan Kingthong All Japan -42 kg Champion
- 2019 ISKA All Japan Tournament -55 kg Winner

=== Karate ===
- 2017 Shin Karate Japan Cup K-3 middle school -45 kg Winner
- 2018 Shin Karate All Japan Grand Prix K-3 middle school -50 kg Winner
- 2018 Glove Karate Federation All Japan -55 kg Winner
- 2019 Shin Karate All Japan Grand Prix K-3 Winner
- 2020 Shin Karate Kansai K-2 Grand Prix Lightweight Winner

== Fight record ==
Professional Kickboxing record
16 Wins (8 (T)KO's), 6 Losses, 2 Draws, 0 No Contest
Date	Result	Opponent	Event	Location	Method	Round	Time
2026-11-08	Loss	(Japan) Jin Mandokoro	RISE 203	Tokyo, Japan	Decision (Unanimous)	5	3:00
For the vacant RISE Super Flyweight (-53 kg) title.
2026-08-29	Win	(Japan) Kaito Hasegawa	RISE 201	Tokyo, Japan	KO (Left cross)	2	2:08
2026-04-26	Win	(Japan) Reiya	RISE 197	Tokyo, Japan	Decision (Unanimous)	3	3:00
2025-11-02	Loss	(Japan) Sora Tanazawa	RISE World Series 2025 Final	Tokyo, Japan	Decision (Unanimous)	3	3:00
2025-05-11	Loss	(Japan) Jin Mandokoro	RISE Fire Ball	Nagoya, Japan	Decision (Split)	3	3:00
2025-02-23	Win	(Japan) Tenshi Matsumoto	RISE 186	Tokyo, Japan	Decision (Unanimous)	3	3:00
2024-11-23	Loss	(Japan) Ryujin Nasukawa	RISE 183	Tokyo, Japan	TKO (Left hook)	1	2:12
Loses the RISE Flyweight (-51.5 kg) title.
2024-06-15	Win	(Thailand) Sudlor SorJor.Tongprachin	RISE WORLD SERIES 2024 OSAKA	Osaka, Japan	KO (Body punches)	3	2:35
2024-02-23	Win	(Thailand) Khunsuk PetchyindeeAcademy	RISE 176	Tokyo, Japan	Ext.R Decision (Unanimous)	4	3:00
2023-10-29	Win	(Japan) Tenshi Matsumoto	RISE 172	Tokyo, Japan	Decision (Unanimous)	5	3:00
Wins the vacant RISE Flyweight (-51.5 kg) title.
2023-07-02	Win	(Japan) Hiroki Matsuoka	RISE World Series 2023 - 1st Round	Osaka, Japan	Decision (Unanimous)	3	3:00
2023-02-23	Win	(Thailand) Prandam BRAVELY	RISE 165: RISE 20th Memorial event	Tokyo, Japan	KO (Left straight)	2	2:49
2022-10-30	Loss	(Japan) Toki Tamaru	RISE 162	Tokyo, Japan	Decision (Unanimous)	5	3:00
For the inaugural RISE Flyweight (-51.5 kg) title.
2022-08-21	Win	(Japan) Yoshiki Tane	RISE WORLD SERIES OSAKA 2022	Osaka, Japan	KO (Left hook)	1	1:17
2022-04-24	Win	(Japan) Momu Tsukamoto	RISE 157 - Flyweight Championship Tournament, Semi Final	Tokyo, Japan	Decision (Majority)	3	3:00
2022-01-23	Loss	(Japan) Ryuta Suekuni	RISE 154	Tokyo, Japan	Decision (Unanimous)	3	3:00
2021-11-14	Win	(Japan) Gentaro Kai	RISE WORLD SERIES 2021 Osaka	Osaka, Japan	KO (High kick)	2	1:32
2021-10-17	Win	(Japan) Tsubasa Hirano	HOOST CUP KINGS KYOTO 8	Kyoto, Japan	KO (Left cross)	1	
2021-08-28	Win	(Japan) Shoki Hoshikubo	RISE EVOL 8	Tokyo, Japan	Decision (Unanimous)	3	3:00
2021-07-28	Draw	(Japan) Ryuya Okuwaki	RISE 151	Tokyo, Japan	Decision (Majority)	3	3:00
2021-06-13	Draw	(Japan) Hyuga Umemoto	Stand up vol.2	Tokyo, Japan	Decision (Majority)	3	3:00
2021-03-07	Win	(Japan) Daina	HOOST CUP KINGS KYOTO 7	Kyoto, Japan	KO (Left cross)	2	
2021-01-17	Win	(Japan) Ren	RISE EVOL 7	Tokyo, Japan	KO (Punches)	1	
2020-09-20	Win	(Japan) Rui Kasami	RISE EVOL 6	Tokyo, Japan	Decision (Unanimous)	3	3:00
Legend: Win Loss Draw/No contest Notes

=== Amateur record ===
Amateur Kickboxing record
Date	Result	Opponent	Event	Location	Method	Round	Time
2019-12-22	Win	(Japan) Ryouma Takeuchi	Stand up vol.1 New Generation	Tokyo, Japan	Decision	3	2:00
2019-12-01	Win	(Japan) Tsubaki Mori	1st ISKA All Japan Open Amateur Kickboxing Championship, Final	Yokohama, Japan	Decision	3	2:00
Wins ISKA All Japan -55kg title.
2019-10-27	Loss	(Japan) Hyuga Umemoto	Amateur Dageki Kakutougi Japan Cup 2019, Semi Final	Tokyo, Japan			
2019-10-27	Win	(Japan) Seiya Kanazuka	Amateur Dageki Kakutougi Japan Cup 2019, Quarter Final	Tokyo, Japan			
2019-10-06	Draw	(Japan) Keigo Nishikawa	Suk Wanchai MuayThai Super Fight vol.6	Tokyo, Japan	Decision		
2019-07-14	Win	(Japan)	K's Cup	Tokyo, Japan	Decision	2	2:00
2019-02-24	Win	(Japan) Jun Ikeda	NJKF 2019 west 1st	Hamamatsu, Japan	Decision (Majority)	3	2:00
2019-01-20	Loss	(Japan) Yuki Hamada	NEXT LEVEL Kansai 53	Sakai, Japan	Decision (Unanimous)	2	2:00
2017-11-05	Win	(Japan) Tenma Nagai	Muay Thai Super Fight Suk Wan Kingtong vol.9	Tokyo, Japan	Decision (Unanimous)	5	1:30
Wins Suk Wan Kingtong All Japan -42kg title.
2017-10-09	Win	(Japan) Ryoga Terayama	Amateur Dageki Kakutougi Japan Cup 2017, Final	Tokyo, Japan	Decision (Unanimous)	2	1:30
Wins 2017 Japan Cup Middle School -45kg title.
2017-10-09	Win	(Japan)	Amateur Dageki Kakutougi Japan Cup 2017, Semi Final	Tokyo, Japan	Decision	1	2:00
2017-07-10	Win	(Japan)	Green Boy Fight, Final	Kyoto, Japan	Decision	2	2:00
Wins Green Boy Fight Welterweight title.
2017-07-10	Win	(Japan) Shun Tsutsumi	Green Boy Fight, Semi Final	Kyoto, Japan	Decision	2	2:00
2017-05-21	Win	(Japan) Shin Masuda	MuayThai Super Fight Suk Wan Kingthong vol.7, Kansai Selection Final	Kyoto, Japan	KO	2	
2017-05-21	Win	(Japan) Hiroto Yokoyama	MuayThai Super Fight Suk Wan Kingthong vol.7, Kansai Selection Semi Final	Kyoto, Japan	Decision (Unanimous)	2	
2016-10-09	Win	(Japan) Yuki Baba	Suk Wan Kingthong Amateur, Real Champion Tournament Final	Tokyo, Japan	Decision (Unanimous)		
2016-10-09	Win	(Japan) Eiji Katsura	Suk Wan Kingthong Amateur, Real Champion Tournament Semi Final	Tokyo, Japan			
2016-03-21	Loss	(Japan) Shunpei Kitano	Green Boy Fight, Final	Kyoto, Japan			
For the Green Boy Fight Super Featherweight title.
2016-03-21	Win	(Japan) Daina Kitayama	Green Boy Fight, Semi Final	Kyoto, Japan			
2016-03-21	Win	(Japan) Yushin Endo	Green Boy Fight, Quarter Final	Kyoto, Japan			
2015-09-06	Loss	(Japan) Riku Narita	Shoot Boxing Amateur Kansai	Osaka, Japan	Ext.R Decision (Unanimous)	3	2:00
2015-06-07	Loss	(Japan) Tomohiro Ushida	Shoot Boxing Amateur Kansai	Osaka, Japan	Ext.R Decision (Unanimous)	3	2:00
2015-03-01	Win	(Japan) Tomohiro Ushida	Shoot Boxing Amateur Kansai	Osaka, Japan	Decision (Unanimous)	2	2:00
Legend: Win Loss Draw/No contest Notes
