= Jigsaw SitThailand =

Thai Muay Thai fighter

- Born: Nattapong Pongpan; 2004 (age 21–22); Surat Thani province, Thailand
- Other names: Jigsaw Adsanpatong (จิ๊กซอว์ แอ๊ดสันป่าตอง); Jigsaw AutoR1 (จิ๊กซอว์ ออโต้อาร์วัน); Jigsaw NayoksoywiangyongLamphun (จิ๊กซอว์ นายกสร้อยเวียงยองลำพูน)
- Height: 160 cm (5 ft 3 in)
- Weight: 51 kg (112 lb; 8 st 0 lb)
- Division: Light Flyweight; Flyweight
- Style: Muay Thai
- Stance: Orthodox
- Fighting out of: Chiang Mai, Thailand
- Team: Sit-Thailand
- Trainer: Thailand Pinsinchai

Kickboxing record
- Total: 139
- Wins: 105
- Losses: 33
- Draws: 1

Nattapong Pongpan, known professionally as Jigsaw SitThailand (Thai: จิ๊กซอว์ ศิษย์ไทยแลนด์) is a Thai Muay Thai fighter. He is the reigning Rajadamnern Stadium Flyweight Champion.

== Career ==
Jigsaw faced Singdam Kiatfufueng at the Rangsit Stadium on February 16, 2024. He won the fight by unanimous decision.

On June 20, 2024, Jigsaw faced Singhaphet Piyaphanfarm at the Rajadamnern Stadium for the Petchyindee promotion. He won the fight by unanimous decision.

On July 16, 2024, Jigsaw defeated Nuathoranee Jitmuangnon by decision on a Muaymansananmuang promotion event at the Rajadamnern Stadium.

Jigsaw made the first defense of his Rajadamnern Stadium Flyweight title on February 15, 2025, against Ryuya Okuwaki on a Rajadamnern World Series event. He won the fight by unanimous decision.

== Titles and accomplishments ==
- Rajadamnern Stadium
  - 2024 Rajadamnern Stadium Flyweight (112 lbs) Champion
    - Four successful title defenses
- International Federation of Muaythai Associations
  - 2023 IFMA Youth World Championship U23 -51 kg (gold)

Awards

- 2025 Sports Authority of Thailand Fight of the Year (vs. Duan99 SorJor.TongPrachin)

== Fight record ==
Professional Muay Thai record
107 Wins, 34 Losses, 1 Draw
Date	Result	Opponent	Event	Location	Method	Round	Time
2026-12-20		(Japan) Tenshi Matsumoto	RISE World Series 2026 Tokyo Final	Tokyo, Japan			
2026-10-10	Draw	(Thailand) Petchdet Wor.Sangprapai	Rajadamnern World Series - Knocktober Fest	Bangkok, Thailand	Decision (majority)	5	3:00
For the Rajadamnern Stadium Super Flyweight (115 lbs) title.
2026-08-06	Win	(Thailand) Davinci Luckybanthoeng	Petchyindee, Rajadamnern Stadium	Bangkok, Thailand	KO (Elbow)	3	
2026-06-27	Win	(Thailand) Duan99 SorJor.TongPrachin	Rajadamnern World Series 200	Bangkok, Thailand	Decision (Unanimous)	5	3:00
Defends the Rajadamnern Stadium Flyweight (112 lbs) title.
2026-05-09	Win	(Thailand) Singhapetch BallMahachai	Rajadamnern World Series	Bangkok, Thailand	KO (Elbow)	2	0:44
2026-04-03	Win	(Thailand) Singdam Kiatfufueng	Petchyindee + Samui Super Fight, Wat Sawang Arom	Koh Samui, Thailand	Decision (Unanimous)	5	3:00
2026-02-17	Loss	(Thailand) Nuathoranee Jitmuangnon	Muaymansananmuang, Rajadamnern Stadium	Bangkok, Thailand	Decision	5	3:00
2025-12-20	Win	(Thailand) Singdam Kiatfufueng	Rajadamnern World Series	Bangkok, Thailand	Decision (Unanimous)	5	3:00
Defends the Rajadamnern Stadium Flyweight (112 lbs) title.
2025-11-20	Loss	(Thailand) Detchpichai NavyAndaman	Petchyindee, Rajadamnern Stadium	Bangkok, Thailand	Decision	5	3:00
2025-10-09	Loss	(Thailand) Duan99 SorJor.TongPrachin	Petchyindee, Rajadamnern Stadium	Bangkok, Thailand	Decision	5	3:00
2025-08-21	Win	(Thailand) Fourwin SitJaroensap	Petchyindee, Rajadamnern Stadium	Bangkok, Thailand	KO (Low kicks)	1	
2025-06-19	Win	(Thailand) Nuathoranee Jitmuangnon	Petchyindee, Rajadamnern Stadium	Bangkok, Thailand	Decision	5	3:00
2025-05-17	Win	(Thailand) WaeoWao Wor.Wangprom	Rajadamnern World Series	Bangkok, Thailand	Decision (Unanimous)	5	3:00
Defends the Rajadamnern Stadium Flyweight (112 lbs) title.
2025-02-15	Win	(Japan) Ryuya Okuwaki	Rajadamnern World Series	Bangkok, Thailand	Decision (Unanimous)	5	3:00
Defends the Rajadamnern Stadium Flyweight (112 lbs) title.
2024-12-26	Loss	(Thailand) Nuathoranee Jitmuangnon	CPF Muaymansananmuang, Rajadamnern Stadium	Bangkok, Thailand	Decision	5	3:00
2024-11-21	Loss	(Thailand) Nuathoranee Jitmuangnon	Petchyindee, Rajadamnern Stadium	Bangkok, Thailand	Decision	5	3:00
2024-10-10	Win	(Thailand) Nuathoranee Jitmuangnon	Petchyindee, Rajadamnern Stadium	Bangkok, Thailand	Decision	5	3:00
2024-08-15	Win	(Thailand) KaenUbon Por.Lakboon	Rajadamnern World Series	Bangkok, Thailand	Decision	5	3:00
Wins the Rajadamnern Stadium Flyweight (112 lbs) title.
2024-07-16	Win	(Thailand) Nuathoranee Jitmuangnon	Muaymansananmuang, Rajadamnern Stadium	Bangkok, Thailand	Decision	5	3:00
2024-06-20	Win	(Thailand) Singhaphet Piyaphanfarm	Petchyindee, Rajadamnern Stadium	Bangkok, Thailand	Decision	5	3:00
2024-05-03	Win	(Thailand) Mangkonphet SaimoonSnooker	Muaymanwansuk, Rangsit Stadium	Rangsit, Thailand	Decision	5	3:00
2024-04-04	Loss	(Thailand) WaeoWao Wor.Wangprom	Petchyindee, Rajadamnern Stadium	Bangkok, Thailand	Decision	5	3:00
2024-02-16	Win	(Thailand) Singdam Kiatfufueng	Muaymanmansuk, Rangsit Stadium	Rangsit, Thailand	Decision (Unanimous)	5	3:00
2024-01-11	Win	(Thailand) Phetderndong Teeded99	Petchyindee, Rajadamnern Stadium	Bangkok, Thailand	Decision	5	3:00
2023-12-14	Win	(Thailand) Kraduklek Or.Achariya	Petchyindee, Rajadamnern Stadium	Bangkok, Thailand	Decision	5	3:00
2023-11-21	Win	(Thailand) Saiphet KongtoraneeMuaythai	Muaymansananmuang, Rangsit Stadium	Rangsit, Thailand	KO (Elbow)	3	1:27
2023-10-24	Loss	(Thailand) Singdam Kiatfufueng	Muaymansananmuang, Rangsit Stadium	Rangsit, Thailand	Decision	5	3:00
2023-09-05	Loss	(Thailand) Laempo Sitkhunwasan	Muaymansananmuang, Rangsit Stadium	Rangsit, Thailand	Decision	5	3:00
For the True4U Light Flyweight (108 lbs) title.
2023-07-14	Loss	(Thailand) Laempo Sitkhunwasan	Muaymanwansuk, Rangsit Stadium	Rangsit, Thailand	Decision	5	3:00
For the True4U Light Flyweight (108 lbs) title.
2023-06-10	Win	(Thailand) Petchthanwa EagleMuaythai	Rangsit Stadium	Rangsit, Thailand	Decision	5	3:00
2023-04-08	Win	(Thailand) Ployapichat ApichatMuaythaiGym	Rangsit Stadium	Rangsit, Thailand	KO	1	
2023-03-18	Win	(Thailand) Ployapichat ApichatMuaythaiGym	Rangsit Stadium	Rangsit, Thailand	Decision	5	3:00
2022-12-15	Loss	(Thailand) Mangkonphet SaimoonSnooker	Petchyindee, Rajadamnern Stadium	Bangkok, Thailand	Decision	5	3:00
2022-10-20	Win	(Thailand) Laempo Sitkhunwasan	Petchyindee, Rajadamnern Stadium	Bangkok, Thailand	Disqualification	1	
2022-09-23	Loss	(Thailand) Nuapayak Wor.Sangprapai	Muaymanwansuk, Rangsit Stadium	Rangsit, Thailand	Decision	5	3:00
For the vacant True4U Light Flyweight (108 lbs) title.
2022-09-02	Win	(Thailand) Anantachai Sor.Chokmeechai	Muaymanwansuk, Rangsit Stadium	Rangsit, Thailand	KO	3	
2022-08-04	Win	(Thailand) Jomyuthjiew SitJomyuth	Muaymanwansuk, Rangsit Stadium	Rangsit, Thailand	Decision	5	3:00
2022-07-05	Win	(Thailand) Yodamarin RodsuayJajetsaipriew	Muaymansananmuang, Rangsit Stadium	Rangsit, Thailand	Decision	5	3:00
2022-06-10	Win	(Thailand) Yodlekpet Tor.Morsri	Muaymanwansuk, Rangsit Stadium	Rangsit, Thailand	Decision	5	3:00
2022-05-20	Win	(Thailand) Charan Dabransarakham	Muaymanwansuk, Rangsit Stadium	Rangsit, Thailand	KO	3	
2022-02-25	Loss	(Thailand) Jomyuthjiew SitJomyuth	Muaymanwansuk, Rangsit Stadium	Rangsit, Thailand	Decision	5	3:00
2022-02-03	Loss	(Thailand) Bakno BangsaenFightClub	Petchyindee, Rajadamnern Stadium	Bangkok, Thailand	Decision	5	3:00
2021-12-23	Win	(Thailand) Yodlekpet Tor.Morsri	Petchyindee	Bangkok, Thailand	Decision	5	3:00
2021-10-28	Loss	(Thailand) Saknarin RodsuayJajetsaipriew		Bangkok, Thailand	KO	2	
Legend: Win Loss Draw/No contest Notes

Amateur Muay Thai record
Date	Result	Opponent	Event	Location	Method	Round	Time
2023-10-04	Win	(Morocco) Amine Chetioui	2023 IFMA Youth World Championship, Final	Antalya, Turkey	Decision (30:27)	3	3:00
Wins the 2023 IFMA Youth World Championship U23 -51kg Gold Medal.
2023-10-03	Win	(Armenia) Mher Harutyunyan	2023 IFMA Youth World Championship, Semifinals	Antalya, Turkey	Decision (30:27)	3	3:00
2023-10-02	Win	(Vietnam) Ly Dieu Phuoc	2023 IFMA Youth World Championship, Quarterfinals	Antalya, Turkey	Decision (30:27)	3	3:00
Legend: Win Loss Draw/No contest Notes
