= Momoka Cinderella =

Japanese kickboxer

- Born: Momoka Maki; 19 September 2007 (age 19); Osaka, Japan
- Height: 1.58 m (5 ft 2 in)
- Division: Atomweight
- Style: Kickboxing, Karate
- Stance: Southpaw
- Fighting out of: Osaka, Japan
- Team: Yamaguchi Dojo
- Years active: 2024 - present

Kickboxing record
- Total: 6
- Wins: 6
- By knockout: 1

Momoka Maki (Japanese: 牧桃花) more known as Momoka Cinderella (Japanese: 桃花・シンデレラ; born 19 September 2007) is a Japanese kickboxer. She is the former Deep☆Kick Queen -46 kg champion.

As of November 2025, she was ranked as the 10th-best women's atomweight kickboxer in the world by Beyond Kickboxing.

== Professional career ==
Momoka made her professional kickboxing debut at Deep☆Kick 72 on 7 December 2024. She knocked out Sero in the first round.

Momoka defeated Amiru Yamasaki by unanimous decision at Deep☆Kick Zero 19 on 9 February 2025.

Momoka defeated Miyu Sakata by unanimous decision at Deep☆Kick Zero 21 on 29 April 2025.

Momoka faced Momoka Mandokoro for the inaugural Deep☆Kick Queen -46 kg title at Deep☆Kick 74 on 9 August 2025. She won the fight by unanimous decision.

Momoka faced Minori Kikuchi at RISE 194 on 14 December 2025. She won the fight by unanimous decision.

Momoka vacated her Deep☆Kick Queen -46 kg title.

== Championships and accomplishments ==
- DEEP☆KICK
  - 2025 Deep☆Kick Queen -46 kg Championship

== Fight record ==
Kickboxing record
6 Wins (1 (T)KO), 0 Loss, 0 Draw
Date	Result	Opponent	Event	Location	Method	Round	Time
2026-04-26	Win	(Japan) Honoka Tsujii	RISE 197	Tokyo, Japan	Ext.R Decision (unanimous)	4	3:00
2025-12-14	Win	(Japan) Minori Kikuchi	RISE 194	Tokyo, Japan	Decision (Unanimous)	3	3:00
2025-06-22	Win	(Japan) Momoka Mandokoro	Deep☆Kick 74	Izumiōtsu, Japan	Decision (Unanimous)	3	2:00
Wins the inaugural Deep☆Kick Queen -46kg Championship.
2025-04-29	Win	(Japan) Miyu Sakata	Deep☆Kick Zero 21	Toyonaka, Japan	Decision (Unanimous)	3	2:00
2025-02-09	Win	(Japan) Amiru Yamasaki	Deep☆Kick Zero 19	Toyonaka, Japan	Decision (Unanimous)	3	2:00
2024-12-07	Win	(Japan) Sero	Deep☆Kick 72	Izumiōtsu, Japan	TKO (Referee Stoppage)	1	1:05

== See also ==
- List of female kickboxers
