= Yura Kono =

Japanese kickboxer

Yura
- Born: Yūra Kōno; August 18, 2003 (age 23); Miyazaki, Japan
- Height: 176 cm (5 ft 9 in)
- Weight: 65 kg (143 lb; 10.2 st)
- Style: Kickboxing, Seidokaikan
- Stance: Orthodox
- Fighting out of: Miyazaki, Japan
- Team: Diatiger Gym
- Years active: 2019 - present

Kickboxing record
- Total: 21
- Wins: 19
- By knockout: 10
- Losses: 2
- By knockout: 0
- Draws: 0

Yura Kono (甲野 裕頼, Kōno Yūra; born 18 August 2003), known as YURA is a Japanese kickboxer. He is the reigning RISE Super Lightweight Champion.

As of April 2026, he was the #10 ranked -67.5 kg kickboxer in the world according to Beyond Kickboxing.

== Biography and career ==
=== Early career ===
Yura was born in the city of Miyazaki on the Kyushu island from a Japanese father and a Russian mother. He started martial arts with Seidokaikan full contact Karate at the age of 7. He switched to kickboxing at the age of 13.

On February 13, 2022, Yura faced Hiroki Nishida at MAJKF KING OF SOUL vol.4. He won the fight by unanimous decision.

=== RISE ===
On March 17, 2024, Yura faced Kenta at RISE ELDORADO 2024. He won the fight by unanimous decision.

On October 5, 2024, Yura faced Sota Kimura at RISE Fight Club 2. He won the fight by third round knockout.

Yura faced Taio Asahisa on the 2024 Rizin Fighting Federation new year's eve show at Rizin 49: Decade. He lost the fight by unanimous decision in a bout where both athletes received an eight count.

On March 29, 2025, Yura faced Hiroto Yamaguchi at RISE ELDORADO 2025. He won the fight by first round knockout.

On August 2, 2025, Yura took part in the opening round of the RISE x Glory Last Featherweight Standing Tournament at RISE World Series 2025 Tokyo against Kong Dexiang. He won the fight by first round technical knockout.

Yura was scheduled to face Chadd Collins in the second round of the RISE x Glory Last Featherweight Standing Tournament on November 2, 2025, at RISE World Series 2025 Final. Collins pulled out on injury and Yura qualified to the next round. He faced short notice replacement Sumiya ito in an open finger gloves bout instead. Yura won the fight by first round knockout.

On March 28, 2026, Yura faced Lee Sung-hyun at RISE ELDORADO 2026 as part of the quarterfinals stage of the Glory x RISE Last Featherweight Standing Tournament. He won the fight by technical knockout in the third round.

== Titles and accomplishments ==
=== Professional ===
- International Kyoken Championship
  - 2021 IKC Welterweight (-70 kg) Champion
- Martial Arts Kickboxing Federation
  - 2022 MAJKF Japan Cup Welterweight (-67 kg) Champion
    - One successful title defense
- Real Kakutou Spirits
  - 2023 RKS Welterweight (-67 kg) Champion
- Breaking Down
  - 2024 Breaking Down Kick Featherweight Tournament Winner
  - 2024 Breaking Down Best KO
  - 2025 Breaking Down Kick Featherweight Champion
  - 2025 Breaking Down MVP
- RISE
  - 2026 RISE Super Lightweight (-65kg) Champion

=== Amateur ===
- 2017 Peter Aerts Spirit All Japan Championship U15 -55 kg Runner—up
- 2018 Peter Aerts Spirit All Japan Championship U15 60 kg Winner
- 2021 K-1 Koshien -65 kg Tournament Runner-up

Awards

- Beyond Kickboxing
  - Beyond Kickboxing's 2024 Fight of the Year (vs. Taio Asahisa)

== Kickboxing record ==
Professional Kickboxing record
19 Wins (10 (T)KO's), 2 Losses, 0 Draw
Date	Result	Opponent	Event	Location	Method	Round	Time
2026-09-19	Win	(Japan) Taiju Shiratori	RISE World Series 2026 Tokyo 2	Tokyo, Japan	KO (Punches)	4	0:47
Won the RISE Super Lightweight (-65kg) title.
2026-06-06	Loss	(Japan) Kento Haraguchi	RISE World Series 2026 Tokyo - Last Featherweight Standing Semifinals	Tokyo, Japan	Decision (Unanimous)	3	3:00
2026-03-28	Win	(South Korea) Lee Sung-hyun	RISE ELDORADO 2026 - Last Featherweight Standing Quarterfinals	Tokyo, Japan	TKO (Punches)	3	2:55
2025-11-02	Win	(Japan) Sumiya Ito	RISE World Series 2025 Final	Tokyo, Japan	KO (Jab)	1	1:46
2025-08-02	Win	(China) Kong Dexiang	RISE World Series 2025 Tokyo - Last Featherweight Standing Opening Round	Tokyo, Japan	TKO (Punches)	1	1:33
2025-03-29	Win	(Japan) Hiroto Yamaguchi	RISE ELDORADO 2025	Tokyo, Japan	KO (Left hook)	1	1:53
2024-12-31	Loss	(Japan) Taio Asahisa	Rizin 49: Decade	Saitama, Japan	Decision (Unanimous)	3	3:00
2024-10-05	Win	(Japan) Sota Cerberus Kimura	RISE Fight Club 2	Tokyo, Japan	KO (Left hook)	3	0:13
2024-03-17	Win	(Japan) Kenta	RISE ELDORADO 2024	Tokyo, Japan	Decision (Unanimous)	3	3:00
2023-12-03	Win	(Japan) Negimajin	RISE WEST 21	Fukuoka, Japan	Decision (Unanimous)	3	3:00
2023-10-15	Win	(Japan) Ryo Kurihara	Kyushu Professional Kickboxing vol.15	Fukuoka, Japan	TKO (Referee stoppage)	3	1:10
2023-04-23	Win	(Japan) Ryoki	BEAST 5	Hiroshima, Japan	Decision (Unanimous)	3	3:00
2023-02-18	Win	(Russia) Viktor Akimov	RKS Gold Rush XI	Hiroshima, Japan	TKO (Corner stoppage)	3	
Won the RKS Welterweight (-67kg) title.
2023-01-15	Win	(Japan) Kenta Hatanaka	X FORCE ONE	Nagoya, Japan	Decision (Unanimous)	3	3:00
2022-11-04	Win	(Japan) Kazuki	MAJKF Japan Cup Kick vol.4	Sakai, Japan	TKO (Corner stoppage)	2	0:41
Defended the Japan Cup Welterweight (-67kg) title.
2022-07-18	Win	(Japan) Tenta Onodera	ACCEL 53	Kobe, Japan	Decision (Split)	3	3:00
2022-05-15	Win	(Japan) Riki Sakurai	MAJKF Japan Cup Kick vol.3	Sakai, Japan	KO	2	2:40
Won the Japan Cup Welterweight (-67kg) title.
2022-02-13	Win	(Japan) Hiroki Nishida	MAJKF KING OF SOUL vol.4	Sakai, Japan	Decision (Unanimous)	3	3:00
2021-10-31	Win	(Thailand) Detpanom Chuwattana	Kyoken 20	Osaka, Japan	Decision (Unanimous)	3	3:00
Won the IKC Welterweight (-70kg) title.
2020-11-22	Win	(Japan) Sho Nakaizumi	MAJKF KING OF SOUL vol.2	Sakai, Japan	Decision (Unanimous)	3	3:00
2019-07-21	Win	(Japan) Jukiya Seto	The Toppa 25	Osaka, Japan	Decision (Unanimous)	3	3:00
Legend: Win Loss Draw/No contest Notes

== Exhibition kickboxing record ==
Exhibition Kickboxing Record
9 Wins (4 (T)KO's), 2 Losses, 0 Draw
Date	Result	Opponent	Event	Location	Method	Round	Time
2025-12-14	Win	(China) Han Wenbao	Breaking Down 18	Tokyo, Japan	Ext.R Decision (unanimous)	2	1:00
2025-07-13	Win	(Japan) Ryotaro Ihara	Breaking Down 16	Tokyo, Japan	Decision (unanimous)	1	1:00
Defends the Breaking Down Featherweight Kick title.
2024-12-08	Win	(Japan) NAO	Breaking Down 14 - Featherweight Tournament, Final	Tokyo, Japan	KO (Right hook)	1	0:24
Wins the Breaking 2024 Down Kick Featherweight Tournament.
2024-12-08	Win	(Japan) Ryotaro Ihara	Breaking Down 14 - Featherweight Tournament, Semifinals	Tokyo, Japan	Ext.R Decision (unanimous)	2	1:00
2024-12-08	Win	(Japan) Issa Hosokawa	Breaking Down 14 - Featherweight Tournament, Quarterfinals	Tokyo, Japan	Decision (unanimous)	1	1:00
2024-09-01	Loss	(Japan) Takahiro Yamamoto	Breaking Down 13 - Lightweight Tournament, Semifinals	Tokyo, Japan	Ext.R Decision (unanimous)	2	1:00
2024-06-02	Win	(Japan) LARGE HIGH	Breaking Down 12 - Lightweight Tournament, Quarterfinals	Tokyo, Japan	Decision (unanimous)	1	1:00
2024-02-18	Win	(Japan) Taisei Nishitani	Breaking Down 11	Tokyo, Japan	KO (Right cross)	1	0:53
2023-11-23	Win	(Japan) Dai	Breaking Down 10	Tokyo, Japan	KO (Right cross)	2	0:07
2023-07-01	Loss	(South Korea) Mister Honde	Breaking Down 8.5	Tokyo, Japan	Decision (Majority)	1	1:00
2023-05-21	Win	(Japan) Hiroto Sotohebo	Breaking Down 8	Tokyo, Japan	KO (Right cross)	1	0:29
Legend: Win Loss Draw/No contest Notes

=== Amateur record ===
Amateur Kickboxing record
Date	Result	Opponent	Event	Location	Method	Round	Time
2021-08-29	Loss	(Japan) Haru Furumiya	K-1 Koshien 2021 Tournament, Final	Tokyo, Japan	Decision (Unanimous)	1	3:00
For the 2021 K-1 Koshien -65kg title.
2021-08-29	Win	(Japan) Kazuto Suzuki	K-1 Koshien 2021 Tournament, Semifinals	Osaka, Japan	Decision (Unanimous)	1	2:00
2021-06-20	Loss	(Japan) Hiroto Mori	K-1 Koshien 2021 West Japan Tournament, Final	Osaka, Japan	Decision (Unanimous)	1	2:00
2021-06-20	Win	(Japan) Haru Furumiya	K-1 Koshien 2021 West Japan Tournament, Semifinals	Osaka, Japan	Decision (Split)	1	2:00
2020-08-02	Loss	(Japan) Haru Furumiya	K-1 Koshien 2020 Tournament, Semifinals	Tokyo, Japan	Decision (Unanimous)	1	2:00
2019-08-04	Win	(Japan) Ryunosuke Arima	K-1 Koshien 2019 Tournament, Quarterfinals	Tokyo, Japan	Decision (Unanimous)	1	2:00
Yura withdrew from the tournament due to injury.
2019-07-19	Loss	(Japan) Hiroto Mori	K-1 Koshien 2019 West Japan Tournament, Semifinals	Osaka, Japan	Decision (Unanimous)	1	2:00
2019-07-19	Win	(Japan) Ryuta Kinoshita	K-1 Koshien 2019 West Japan Tournament, Quarterfinals	Osaka, Japan	Decision (Unanimous)	1	2:00
2018-12-02	Win	(Japan) Ryuto Takama	2018 Peter Aerts Spirit All Japan Championship	Osaka, Japan	KO	2	0:49
Wins 2018 Peter Aerts Spirit All Japan Championship U-15 -60kg title.
2017-11-19	Loss	(Japan) Taison Suzuki	2017 Peter Aerts Spirit All Japan Championship, Final	Sendai, Japan	Decision (Unanimous)	2	1:30
For 2017 Peter Aerts Spirit All Japan Championship U-15 -55kg title.
2017-11-19	Win	(Japan) Yugo Kikuchi	2017 Peter Aerts Spirit All Japan Championship, Semifinals	Sendai, Japan	Decision (Unanimous)	2	1:30
Legend: Win Loss Draw/No contest Notes
