= Sora Tanazawa =

Japanese kickboxer

- Born: August 1, 2007 (age 19); Itami, Japan
- Native name: 棚澤大空
- Height: 1.64 m (5 ft 4 1/2 in)
- Weight: 53 kg (117 lb; 8.3 st)
- Style: Karate, Kickboxing
- Stance: Orthodox
- Fighting out of: Osaka, Japan
- Team: Teppen Gym Osaka (2024 - Present)

Kickboxing record
- Total: 14
- Wins: 13
- By knockout: 3
- Losses: 1

Sora Tanazawa (棚澤大空) is a Japanese kickboxer.

As of December 2025, Tanazawa was the #5 ranked -53 kg kickboxer in the world according to Beyond Kickboxing.

== Biography and career ==
Tanazawa made his professional debut on April 28, 2024, at DEEP☆KICK KAMEOKA against Yuzuki. He won the fight by second round knockout.

On October 27, 2024, Tanazawa faced Eito Hasegawa at DEEP☆KICK ZERO 16. He won the fight by unanimous decision.

On December 22, 2024, Tanazawa faced Jo Aizawa at Stand Up Professional Vol.27 for the 2024 King of Rookie -53 kg title. He won the fight majority decision.

On February 9, 2025, Tanazawa faced Fumito Nakata at DEEP☆KICK ZERO 18 in a DEEP☆KICK -53 kg title eliminator. He won the fight by unanimous decision.

On March 22, 2025, Tanazawa faced Atsuki Yamada at DEEP☆KICK 73 for the vacant DEEP☆KICK -53 kg title. He won the fight by split decision.

On May 31, 2025, Tanazawa faced Ryuta Suekuni at RISE 188. He won the fight by second round knockout on a high kick.

On August 30, 2025, Tanazawa took part in a 4-man tournament at RISE 191. In the semifinals he defeated Shuri Sakayori by unanimous decision. In the final he defeated Reiya by unanimous decision to become the Gachi!! tournament winner and take home the 2 million yen cash prize.

On November 2, 2025, Tanazawa faced Riku Kazushima in a RISE Flyweight title eliminator at RISE World Series 2025 Final. He won the fight by unanimous decision.

== Championships and accomplishments ==
=== Kickboxing ===
- RISE
  - 2025 Gachi!! Super Flyweight Tournament Winner
- DEEP☆KICK
  - 2025 DEEP☆KICK -53 kg Champion
    - One successful title defense
- Stand Up
  - 2024 Stand Up King of Rookie -53 kg Tournament Winner

=== Karate ===
- 2015 Byakuren Kaikan All Japan Junior Championship U10 Runner-up
- 2015 Shin Karate K-4 Tournament Elementary School Runner-up
- 2019 JKF All Japan Youth Championship Elementary School 3rd Place
- 2022 WKO All Japan Junior Championship Middle School Lightweight Runner-up

== Fight record ==
Professional Kickboxing record
13 Wins (3 (T)KO's), 1 Loss, 0 Draw
Date	Result	Opponent	Event	Location	Method	Round	Time
2026-08-29	Win	(Japan) Jo Aizawa	RISE 201	Tokyo, Japan	Decision (Unanimous)	3	3:00
2026-06-12	Win	(Uzbekistan) Adham Ruziev	ONE: The Inner Circle 18, Lumpinee Stadium	Bangkok, Thailand	Decision (Split)	3	3:00
2026-02-23	Loss	(Japan) Tenshi Matsumoto	RISE 196	Tokyo, Japan	Decision (Unanimous)	5	3:00
For the vacant RISE Flyweight (-51.5 kg) title.
2025-12-14	Win	(Japan) Fumito Nakata	DEEP☆KICK 76	Osaka, Japan	Decision (Unanimous)	3	3:00
Defends the DEEP KICK -53kg title.
2025-11-02	Win	(Japan) Riku Kazushima	RISE World Series 2025 Final	Tokyo, Japan	Decision (Unanimous)	3	3:00
2025-08-30	Win	(Japan) Reiya	RISE 191 - Gachi!! Tournament, Final	Tokyo, Japan	Decision (Unanimous)	3	3:00
Wins Gachi Tournament Super Flyweight title.
2025-08-30	Win	(Japan) Shuri Sakayori	RISE 191 - Gachi!! Tournament, Semifinals	Tokyo, Japan	Decision (Unanimous)	3	3:00
2025-05-31	Win	(Japan) Ryuta Suekuni	RISE 188	Tokyo, Japan	KO (High kick)	2	2:02
2025-03-22	Win	(Japan) Atsuki Yamada	DEEP☆KICK 73	Osaka, Japan	Decision (Split)	3	3:00
Wins the vacant DEEP KICK -53kg title.
2025-02-09	Win	(Japan) Fumito Nakata	DEEP☆KICK ZERO 18	Osaka, Japan	Decision (Unanimous)	3	3:00
2024-12-22	Win	(Japan) Jo Aizawa	Stand Up Professional Vol.27 King of Rookie 2024	Osaka, Japan	Decision (Majority)	3	3:00
Wins the 2024 Stand Up King of Rookie -53kg title.
2024-10-27	Win	(Japan) Eito Hasegawa	DEEP☆KICK ZERO 16	Osaka, Japan	Decision (Unanimous)	3	3:00
2024-07-21	Win	(Japan) Yuichi	Stand Up Vol.24 King of Rookie 2024	Osaka, Japan	TKO (Doctor stoppage)	1	1:07
2024-04-28	Win	(Japan) Yuzuki	DEEP☆KICK KAMEOKA	Kameoka, Japan	KO (Punches)	2	2:33
Legend: Win Loss Draw/No contest Notes
