= 2026 in RISE =

Kickboxing events

Information
- First date: January 18, 2026

The year 2026 is the 23rd year in the history of RISE, a Japanese kickboxing promotion.

RISE events are streamed on online service Abema TV.

== List of events ==
#	Event title	Date	Arena	Location
1	RISE 195	January 18, 2026	Korakuen Hall	Tokyo, Japan
2	RISE 196	February 23, 2026	Korakuen Hall	Tokyo, Japan
3	RISE ELDORADO 2026	March 28, 2026	Ryōgoku Kokugikan	Tokyo, Japan
4	RISE WEST 29	March 29, 2026	Nishitetsu Hall	Fukuoka, Japan
5	RISE EVOL Osaka vol.2	April 12, 2026	Texpia Osaka	Osaka, Japan
6	RISE 197	April 28, 2026	Korakuen Hall	Tokyo, Japan
7	RISE 198	May 16, 2026	Korakuen Hall	Tokyo, Japan
8	RISE World Series 2026 Tokyo	June 6, 2026	Ebara Wave Arena Ota	Tokyo, Japan
9	RISE 199	June 28, 2026	Korakuen Hall	Tokyo, Japan
10	RISE 200	July 12, 2026	Korakuen Hall	Tokyo, Japan
11	RISE 201	August 29, 2026	Korakuen Hall	Tokyo, Japan
12	RISE World Series 2026 Tokyo 2	September 19, 2026	Ebara Wave Arena Ota	Tokyo, Japan
13	RISE 202	October 17, 2026	Korakuen Hall	Tokyo, Japan
14	RISE 203	November 8, 2026	Korakuen Hall	Tokyo, Japan
15	RISE World Series 2026 Tokyo Final	December 20, 2026	Kanadevia Hall	Tokyo, Japan

== RISE 195 ==
RISE 195
- Promotion: RISE
- Date: January 18, 2026
- Venue: Korakuen Hall
- City: Tokyo, Japan

RISE 195 was a kickboxing event held by RISE at the Korakuen Hall in Tokyo, Japan on January 18, 2026.

=== Background ===
A vacant RISE Super Featherweight title bout between Hyuma Hitachi and Panuwat TGT headlined the event. A ¥2 000 000 welterweight tournament took place during the event, featuring Ruka, Kyosuke, Teppei Wada and Seiya.

=== Fight Card ===
RISE 195
Weight Class				Method	Round	Time	Notes
Super Featherweight 60 kg	(Japan) Hyuma Hitachi	def.	(Thailand) Panuwat TGT	Decision (unanimous)	5	3:00	For the vacant RISE Super Featherweight title
Welterweight 67.5 kg	(Japan) Teppei Wada	def.	(Japan) Ruka	Decision (unanimous)	3	3:00	Gachi!! Tournament, Final
Super Flyweight 53 kg	(Japan) Ryujin Nasukawa	def.	(Japan) Yuto Uemura	TKO (punches)	1	2:24	
Welterweight 67.5 kg	(Japan) Takamasa Abiko	def.	(Japan) Yo Ueda	KO (Knee)	1	0:59	Gachi!! Tournament, reserve
Welterweight 67.5 kg	(Japan) Teppei Wada	def.	(Japan) Seiya	Ext.R Decision (unanimous)	4	3:00	Gachi!! Tournament, Semifinals
Welterweight 67.5 kg	(Japan) Ruka	def.	(Japan) Kyosuke	Decision (unanimous)	3	3:00	Gachi!! Tournament, Semifinals
Flyweight 51.5 kg	(Japan) Sora Koike	def.	(Japan) Fuki Nakazawa	TKO (3 knockdowns)	1	2:00	
Bantamweight 55 kg	(Japan) Kiana	def.	(Japan) Akane Shibuya	Decision (split)	3	3:00	

== RISE 196 ==
RISE 196
- Promotion: RISE
- Date: February 23, 2026
- Venue: Korakuen Hall
- City: Tokyo, Japan

RISE 196 -RISE 23rd Memorial event- was a kickboxing event held by RISE at the Korakuen Hall in Tokyo, Japan in February, 2026.

=== Background ===
This event marks the 23rd anniversary of the RISE promotion.

=== Fight Card ===
RISE 196
Weight Class				Method	Round	Time	Notes
Flyweight 51.5 kg	(Japan) Tenshi Matsumoto	def.	(Japan) Sora Tanazawa	Decision (unanimous)	5	3:00	For the vacant RISE Flyweight title
Featherweight 57.5 kg	(Japan) Ryunosuke Omori	def.	(Japan) Taisei Umei	Ext.R Decision (unanimous)	4	3:00	
Super Lightweight 65 kg	(Japan) Yutaro Asahi	def.	(Japan) Sota Kimura	Decision (majority)	3	3:00	
Featherweight 57.5 kg	(Japan) Kakeru	def.	(Japan) Daiki Toita	Decision (majority)	3	3:00	
Featherweight 57.5 kg	(Japan) Shoa Arii	def.	(Japan) Ryunosuke Matsushita	TKO (doctor stoppage)	3	1:26	
Flyweight 51.5 kg	(Japan) Shion Masaki	def.	(Japan) Yumeto Mizuno	Decision (unanimous)	3	3:00	
Bantamweight 55 kg	(Japan) Yusei Horimoto	def.	(Japan) Tomoya Fukui	TKO (right cross)	1	1:18	
Super Featherweight 60 kg	(Japan) Yutaro Hori	def.	(Japan) Koki Shiratori	Decision (unanimous)	3	3:00	
Super Flyweight 53 kg	(Japan) Kodai Ono	def.	(Japan) Tomoki Uchiyama	TKO (3 knockdowns)	1	2:39	
Atomweight 46 kg	(Japan) Runa Okumura	def.	(Japan) Marimo	Decision (unanimous)	3	3:00	
Women Flyweight 52 kg	(Japan) Juri Okumura	def.	(Japan) Marina	KO (body kick)	3	2:37	

== Rise eldorado 2026 ==
RISE ELDORADO 2026
- Promotion: RISE
- Date: March 28, 2026
- Venue: Ryōgoku Kokugikan
- City: Tokyo, Japan

RISE ELDORADO 2026 or GLORY 106 was a kickboxing event held by RISE at the Ryōgoku Kokugikan in Tokyo, Japan on March 28, 2026.

=== Background ===
A RISE Bantamweight World title bout between champion Shiro and challenger Koki Osaki was scheduled as the main event, while the GLORY x RISE Last Featherweight Standing Quarterfinals took place on the undercard.

=== Fight Card ===
RISE ELDORADO 2026
Weight Class				Method	Round	Time	Notes
Bantamweight 55 kg	(Japan) Koki Osaki	def.	(Japan) Shiro (c)	Decision (unanimous)	5	3:00	For the RISE Bantamweight World title
Super Flyweight 53 kg	(Japan) Ryujin Nasukawa	def.	(Japan) Kaito Hasegawa	TKO (3 knockdowns)	5	1:17	For the vacant RISE Super Flyweight title
Catchweight 59 kg	(Japan) Haruto Yasumoto	def.	(Japan) Takumi Terada	Decision (unanimous)	3	3:00	
Super Lightweight 65 kg	(Japan) Kento Haraguchi	def.	(Japan) Hiroki Kasahara	Decision (unanimous)	3	3:00	GLORY x RISE Last Featherweight Standing Quarterfinals
Super Lightweight 65 kg	(Japan) YURA	def.	(South Korea) Lee Sung-hyun	TKO (punches)	3	2:55	GLORY x RISE Last Featherweight Standing Quarterfinals
Super Lightweight 65 kg	(Thailand) Petpanomrung Kiatmuu9	def.	(Mexico) Abraham Vidales	Decision (unanimous)	3	3:00	GLORY x RISE Last Featherweight Standing Quarterfinals
Super Lightweight 65 kg	(Portugal) Miguel Trindade	def.	(Albania) Berjan Peposhi	Ext.R Decision (unanimous)	4	3:00	GLORY x RISE Last Featherweight Standing Quarterfinals
Catchweight 66 kg	(Thailand) Capitan Petchyindee Academy	def.	(Japan) Taiju Shiratori	Tech decision (majority)	4	0:28	
Catchweight 61.5 kg	(Japan) Kan Nakamura	def.	(Thailand) Phet A-Cheer BangsaenFightClub	KO (left cross)	1	2:40	
Super Featherweight 60 kg	(Japan) Yuta Kunieda	def.	(Japan) Yoshihisa Morimoto	Decision (majority)	3	3:00	
Middleweight 70 kg	(Japan) Kakushi Takagi	def.	(Japan) Ryoya Inai	Decision (unanimous)	3	3:00	
Bantamweight 55 kg	(Japan) Masahiko Suzuki	def.	(Japan) Ryoya Ito	TKO (3 knockdowns)	1	2:24	
Preliminary Card
Flyweight 51.5 kg	(Japan) Shion Masaki	def.	(Japan) Toranosuke Matsuda	Decision (unanimous)	3	3:00	
Featherweight 57.5 kg	(Japan) Aira	def.	(Japan) Yuki Matsumoto	Decision (unanimous)	3	3:00	
Super Featherweight 60 kg	(Japan) Toru Kugo	def.	(Japan) Taku Endo	Decision (unanimous)	3	3:00	

== RISE WEST 29 ==
RISE WEST 29
- Promotion: RISE
- Date: March 29, 2026
- Venue: Nishitetsu Hall
- City: Fukuoka, Japan

RISE WEST 29 was a kickboxing event held by RISE at the Nishitetsu Hall in Fukuoka, Japan on March 29, 2026.

=== Fight Card ===
RISE WEST 29
Weight Class				Method	Round	Time	Notes
Super Flyweight 53 kg	(Japan) Hiroto	draw.	(Japan) Yushi Nakamura	Decision (majority)	3	3:00	
Lightweight 62.5 kg	(Japan) Ryotaro	def.	(Japan) Takumi	KO	1	2:02	
Flyweight 51.5 kg	(Japan) Shiryu Minamihara	def.	(Japan) Hyuga Nemoto	Decision (unanimous)	3	3:00	
Heavyweight	(Japan) Takuya Sakamoto	def.	(Japan) Kenta Mori	KO	2	1:56	
Super Flyweight 53 kg	(Japan) Seji Maruyama	def.	(Japan) Masaya	KO	2	2:21	
Catchweight 63.5 kg	(Japan) Atsuhiro Konishi	def.	(Japan) Kanade	Decision (unanimous)	3	3:00	

== RISE EVOL Osaka vol.2 ==
RISE EVOL Osaka vol.2
- Promotion: RISE
- Date: April 26, 2026
- Venue: Texpia Osaka
- City: Osaka, Japan

RISE EVOL Osaka vol.2 was a kickboxing event held by RISE at Texpia Osaka in Osaka, Japan on April 12, 2026.

=== Fight Card ===
RISE EVOL Osaka vol.2
Weight Class				Method	Round	Time	Notes
Bantamweight 55 kg	(Japan) Atsuki Yamada	def.	(Japan) Jin	KO (High kick)	1	2:04	
Featherweight 57.5 kg	(Japan) Masamitsu Kutsuwa	def.	(Japan) Kengo	Decision	3	3:00	
Lightweight 62.5 kg	(Japan) Taisei Kondo	def.	(Japan) Tatsuto	KO	2		
Welterweight 67.5 kg	(Japan) Aito	def.	(Japan) Kyosuke	KO	1		
Light Heavyweight 90 kg	(Japan) Miyagin	def.	(Japan) Takahiro Kikutani	KO	2		
Faetherweight 57.5 kg	(Japan) Shoma	def.	(Japan) Kaito Fujii	Decision	3	3:00	
Faetherweight 57.5 kg	(Japan) Lucifer Hiromu Arakawa	def.	(Japan) Kabuto	Decision	3	3:00	
Bantamweight 55 kg	(Japan) Kosei Tanaka	def.	(Japan) Tomoya Zenke	KO	2		
Super Flyweight 53 kg	(Japan) Rui Onoda	draw.	(Japan) Suhon	Decision	3	3:00	
Catchweight 46.5 kg	(Japan) Ayame	def.	(Japan) Misaki Nagano	KO	1		

== RISE 197 ==
RISE 197
- Promotion: RISE
- Date: April 26, 2026
- Venue: Korakuen Hall
- City: Tokyo, Japan

RISE 197 was a kickboxing event held by RISE at the Korakuen Hall in Tokyo, Japan on April 26, 2026.

=== Fight Card ===
RISE 197
Weight Class				Method	Round	Time	Notes
Catchweight 48 kg	(Thailand) Phayahong Banchamek	def.	(Japan) Mei Miyamoto	Decision (unanimous)	3	3:00	
Lightweight 62.5 kg	(Japan) Ryuto Shiokawa	def.	(Japan) Masahito Okuyama	Ext.R Decision (unanimous)	6	3:00	For the vacant RISE Lightweight title
Super Flyweight 53 kg	(Japan) Riku Kazushima	def.	(Japan) Reiya	Decision (unanimous)	3	3:00	
Super Flyweight 53 kg	(Japan) Momu Tsukamoto	def.	(Japan) Ryunosuke Ito	KO (punches)	1	1:05	
Bantamweight 55 kg	(Japan) Yusei Horimoto	def.	(Japan) Yugo Kato	Decision (majority)	3	3:00	
Super Lightweight 65 kg	(Japan) Yuki Tanaka	def.	(Japan) Shota	TKO (doctor stoppage)	1		
Catchweight 67 kg	(Japan) Taichi Nomura	def.	(Taiwan) Kyowlow	Decision (unanimous)	3	3:00	
Atomweight 46 kg	(Japan) Momoka Cinderella	def.	(Japan) Honoka Tsujii	Ext.R Decision (unanimous)	4	3:00	
Women's Flyweight 52 kg	(Japan) Yaya Weerasakreck	def.	(Japan) Manaka	Ext.R Decision (unanimous)	4	3:00	
Super Lightweight 65 kg	(Japan) Yuya Kubota	draw.	(Japan) Ryota Tago	Decision (split)	3	3:00	
Featherweight 57.5 kg	(Japan) Daichi Nishikata	def.	(Japan) Sosuke Kakamu	TKO (referee stoppage)	2	2:02	

== RISE 198 ==
RISE 198
- Promotion: RISE
- Date: May 16, 2026
- Venue: Korakuen Hall
- City: Tokyo, Japan

RISE 198 will be a kickboxing event held by RISE at the Korakuen Hall in Tokyo, Japan on May 16, 2026.

=== Fight Card ===
RISE 198
Weight Class				Method	Round	Time	Notes
Catchtweight 62.5 kg	(Japan) Kan Nakamura	def.	(Thailand) Kaipa Wor.Sangprapai	KO (knee to the body)	2	1:04	
Super Lightweight 65 kg	(Japan) Genki Morimoto	def.	(Japan) Sota Cerberus Kimura	Decision (unanimous)	3	3:00	
Super Featherweight 60 kg	(Japan) Ryunosuke Hosokoshi	def.	(Japan) Ryuto	Decision (unanimous)	3	3:00	
Featherweight 57.5 kg	(Japan) Akito Nakashima	def.	(Japan) Shun Shiraishi	TKO referee stoppage)	2	1:25	
Bantamweight 55 kg	(Japan) Musashi Matsushita	def.	(Japan) Hiroya Oshima	Decision (unanimous)	3	3:00	
Flyweight 51.5 kg	(Japan) King Rikuto	def.	(Japan) Tasuku Okubo	Decision (unanimous)	3	3:00	
Catchweight 85 kg	(Democratic Republic of the Congo) Gunther Kalunda	def.	(South Korea) Park Sungjoo	TKO (referee stoppage)	3	1:18	
Super Featherweight 60 kg	(Japan) Aoi Kadowaki	def.	(Japan) Shosuke Iwanaga	Decision (majority)	3	3:00	Korakuen Jambull selection fight
Super Featherweight 60 kg	(Japan) Soya Tanigawa	def.	(Japan) Masaya Shoji	Decision (unanimous)	3	3:00	
Mini Flyweight 49 kg	(Japan) Mina Hayashi	def.	(Japan) Hiyori	Decision (split)	3	3:00	

== RISE World Series 2026 Tokyo ==
RISE World Series 2026 Tokyo
- Promotion: RISE
- Date: June 6, 2026
- Venue: Ebara Wave Arena Ota
- City: Tokyo, Japan

RISE World Series 2026 Tokyo - RISE x Glory Last Featherweight Standing Final or Glory 108 is a kickboxing event that will be held by RISE at the Ebara Wave Arena Ota in Tokyo, Japan on June 6, 2026.

=== Background ===
The event will feature the final 4 of the RISE x Glory Last Featherweight Standing Tournament.

=== GLORY x RISE Last Featherweight Standing bracket ===
Opening Round (2025-06-21) & (2025-08-02)
(France) Bobo Sacko	UD
(Netherlands) Jan Kaffa	3
(Morocco) Ayoub Bourass	3
(Spain) Aitor Currito	UD
(Italy) Achraf Aasila	UD
(Algeria) Lounis Saing	3
(Germany) Denis Wosik	UD
(Thailand) Suarek TeppenGym	3
(Japan) YURA	TKO
(China) Kong Dexiang	1
(Japan) Yutaro Asahi	KO
(Spain) Catalin Eduardo	3
(Japan) Sumiya Ito	3
(Moldova) Petru Morari	SD
(Japan) Hiroki Kasahara	UD
(Thailand) Lompetch BeastGym	3

Second Round (2025-10-11), (2025-11-02) & (2025-12-13)
(Portugal) Miguel Trindade	UD
(France) Bobo Sacko	3
(Spain) Aitor Currito	3
(Albania) Berjan Peposhi	UD
(Mexico) Abraham Vidales	UD
(Italy) Achraf Aasila	3
(Germany) Denis Wosik	3
(Thailand) Petpanomrung Kiatmuu9	UD
(Australia) Chadd Collins
(Japan) YURA	BYE^{a}
(Japan) Yutaro Asahi	3
(South Korea) Lee Sung-hyun	MD
(Japan) Kento Haraguchi	TKO
(Moldova) Petru Morari	1
(Japan) Hiroki Kasahara	UD
(Japan) Taiju Shiratori	Ex.R

Quarterfinals (2026-03-28)
(Portugal) Miguel Trindade	UD
(Albania) Berjan Peposhi	Ex.R
(Mexico) Abraham Vidales	3
(Thailand) Petpanomrung Kiatmuu9	UD
(Japan) YURA	TKO
(South Korea) Lee Sung-hyun	3
(Japan) Kento Haraguchi	UD
(Japan) Hiroki Kasahara	3

Semifinals
(Portugal) Miguel Trindade	3
(Thailand) Petpanomrung Kiatmuu9	MD
(Japan) YURA	3
(Japan) Kento Haraguchi	UD

Final
(Japan) Kento Haraguchi	UD
(Thailand) Petpanomrung Kiatmuu9	Ex.R

^{a} YURA qualified automatically as Chadd Collins withdrew from the fight due to injury.

=== Fight Card ===
RISE World Series 2026 Tokyo
Weight Class				Method	Round	Time	Notes
Super Lightweight 65 kg	(Japan) Kento Haraguchi	def.	(Thailand) Petpanomrung Kiatmuu9	Ext.R Decision (unanimous)	4	3:00	GLORY x RISE Last Featherweight Standing Final
Bantamweight 55 kg	(Japan) Kazuki Osaki	def.	(Japan) Ryujin Nasukawa	Ext.R Decision (unanimous)	4	3:00	
Catchweight 63.5 kg	(Australia) Chadd Collins	def.	(Thailand) Kimluay WanKongOhm	Decision (majority)	3	3:00	
Welterweight 67.5 kg	(Japan) Meison Hide Usami	def.	(Thailand) Peemai Por.Kobkua	KO (uppercut)	1	0:43	
Catchweight 63.5 kg	(Japan) Yutaro Asahi	def.	(Thailand) Changsuek Petchyindee	Decision (majority)	3	3:00	
Catchweight 58 kg	(Japan) Haruto Yasumoto	def.	(China) Ze Waliuo	Decision (unanimous)	3	3:00	
Super Lightweight 65 kg	(Thailand) Petpanomrung Kiatmuu9	def.	(Portugal) Miguel Trindade	Decision (majority)	3	3:00	GLORY x RISE Last Featherweight Standing Semifinals
Super Lightweight 65 kg	(Japan) Kento Haraguchi	def.	(Japan) YURA	Decision (unanimous)	3	3:00	GLORY x RISE Last Featherweight Standing Semifinals
Bantamweight 55 kg	(Japan) Masashi Kumura	def.	(Philippines) Joemar Gallaza	TKO (3 knockdowns)	1	1:23	
Lightweight 62.5 kg	(Japan) Kiyoto Takahashi	def.	(Japan) Achi	TKO (referee stoppage)	3	2:23	
Middleweight 70 kg	(Japan) Kakushi Takagi	def.	(Japan) Shoma	TKO (referee stoppage)	3	0:54	
Welterweight 67.5 kg	(Japan) Ruka	def.	(Japan) Aito	Decision (majority)	3	3:00	
Flyweight 51.5 kg	(Japan) Fuki Nakazawa	draw.	(Japan) Kyohei Nishijima	Decision (split)	3	3:00	
Preliminary Card
Flyweight 51.5 kg	(Japan) Yumeto Mizuno	def.	(Japan) Toranosuke Matsuda	TKO (punches)	1	0:42	
Lightweight 62.5 kg	(Japan) Mitsuki Gorichu Kanazawa	def.	(Japan) Yuga Asano	TKO (referee stoppage)	2	2:24	
Super Flyweight 53 kg	(Japan) Kodai Ono	def.	(Japan) Etsushi Kinoshita	Decision (unanimous)	3	3:00	

== RISE 199 ==
RISE 199
- Promotion: RISE
- Date: June 28, 2026
- Venue: Korakuen Hall
- City: Tokyo, Japan

RISE 199 will be a kickboxing event held by RISE at the Korakuen Hall in Tokyo, Japan on June 28, 2026.

=== Fight Card ===
RISE 199
Weight Class				Method	Round	Time	Notes
Middleweight 70 kg	(Japan) Motoyasu	def.	(Japan) Yuya	Decision (unanimous)	5	3:00	For the vacant RISE Middleweight title.
Catchweight 46 kg	(Japan) Haruka Shimada	def.	(Thailand) Pancake Sor.Kongprakan	TKO (3 knockdowns)	1		
Super Lightweight 65 kg	(Japan) Sumiya Ito	def.	(Japan) Ke-suke	Decision (unanimous)	3	3:00	
Lightweight 62.5 kg	(Japan) Shota Okudaira	def.	(Japan) Kinchan	TKO	3	1:42	
Featherweight 57.5 kg	(Japan) Shoa Arii	def.	(Japan) Kazuhiro Matsuyama	KO (punches)	2	1:23	
Featherweight 57.5 kg	(Japan) Masamitsu Kutsuwa	def.	(Japan) Ryogo	TKO (3 knockdowns)	2	2:53	
Super Featherweight 60 kg	(Japan) G-Rex	def.	(Japan) Tatsuma	Decision (majority)	3	3:00	
Atomweight 46 kg	(Japan) Runa Okumura	def.	(Japan) Ayame	Decision (unanimous)	3	3:00	
Atomweight 46 kg	(South Korea) Jung Yujung	def.	(Japan) Emiko Konishi	Decision (majority)	3	3:00	
Women's Flyweight 52 kg	(Japan) Megumi Yamaguchi	def.	(Japan) Juri	Decision (unanimous)	3	3:00	
Bantamweight 55 kg	(Japan) Tomoya Fukui	def.	(Japan) Keito Kanayama	Decision (majority)	3	3:00	

== RISE 200 ==
RISE 200
- Promotion: RISE
- Date: July 12, 2026
- Venue: Korakuen Hall
- City: Tokyo, Japan

RISE 200 will be a kickboxing event held by RISE at the Korakuen Hall in Tokyo, Japan on July 12, 2026.

=== Fight Card ===
RISE 200
Weight Class				Method	Round	Time	Notes
Bantamweight 55 kg	(Japan) Ryu Hanaoka	def.	(France) Djillali Kharroubi	Decision (unanimous)	5	3:00	For the vacant ISKA Unified rules World Bantamweight (-55kg) title
Featherweight 57.5 kg	(Japan) Akito Nakashima	def.	(Japan) Taisei Umei	Decision (unanimous)	3	3:00	
Lightweight 62.5 kg	(Japan) GUMP	def.	(South Korea) Chan Hyung Lee	Decision (majority)	3	3:00	
Welterweight 67.5 kg	(Japan) Teppei Wada	def.	(Japan) Kenta	Decision (unanimous)	3	3:00	
Middleweight 70 kg	(Japan) Takafumi Morita	def.	(Japan) Yuya Motono	KO (Knee)	2	1:03	
Flyweight 51.5 kg	(Japan) Shion Masaki	def.	(Japan) Blackshisa Sotaro	KO (punches)	1	1:01	
Featherweight 57.5 kg	(Japan) Retsu Sashida	def.	(Japan) Kanta Tabuchi	Decision (unanimous)	3	3:00	
Lightweight 62.5 kg	(Japan) Andrei Haraguchi	def.	(Japan) Masashi	KO (Punches)	2	1:35	
Flyweight 51.5 kg	(Japan) Kairi Yatagai	def.	(Japan) Oki	Decision (unanimous)	3	3:00	
Preliminary Card
Catchweight 64 kg	(Japan) Teio	def.	(Japan) Hidehito Shimizu	Decision (unanimous)	2	1:30	RISE VOA Amateur rules
Super Flyweight 53 kg	(Japan) Ryuzo Aida	def.	(Japan) Haruya Miyamoto	Decision (majority)	2	2:00	RISE NOVA Amateur rules

== RISE 201 ==
RISE 201
- Promotion: RISE
- Date: August 29, 2026
- Venue: Korakuen Hall
- City: Tokyo, Japan

RISE 201 will be a kickboxing event held by RISE at the Korakuen Hall in Tokyo, Japan on August 29, 2026.

=== Fight Card ===
RISE 201
Weight Class				Method	Round	Time	Notes
Light Heavyweight 90 kg	(Japan) Kenta Nanbara (c)	def.	(Democratic Republic of the Congo) Gunther Kalunda	KO (pucnhes)	3	1:39	For the RISE Light Heavyweight Championship
Mini Flyweight 49 kg	(Japan) Mei Miyamoto	def.	(Thailand) Namwan Sor.Kongkrapan	KO (body punches)	1	2:27	
Super Flyweight 53 kg	(Japan) Riku Kazushima	def.	(Japan) Kaito Hasegawa	KO (left cross)	2	2:08	
Super Flyweight 53 kg	(Japan) Sora Tanazawa	def.	(Japan) Jo Aizawa	Decision (unanimous)	3	3:00	
Flyweight 51.5 kg	(Japan) King Rikuto	def.	(Japan) Reiya	Decision (unanimous)	3	3:00	
Lightweight 62. kg	(Japan) Masahito Okuyama	def.	(Japan) Taku	Decision (unanimous)	3	3:00	
Super Featherweight 60 kg	(Japan) Ryunosuke Hosokoshi	def.	(Japan) Koki Ueno	KO (right hook)	1	0:51	
Atomweight 46 kg	(Japan) Honoka Kobayashi	def.	(Japan) Mitsudaman	TKO (referee stoppage)	3	1:58	
Atomweight 46 kg	(Japan) Hinata Kitano	def.	(Japan) Emiko Konishi	Decision (unanimous)	3	3:00	Open finger gloves match
Super Flyweight 53 kg	(Japan) Kosei Sasaki	def.	(Japan) Rikuto Iida	Decision (unanimous)	3	3:00	
Lightweight 62.5 kg	(Japan) Yuga Sakura	def.	(Japan) Noboru Kuboyama	KO (right cross)	1	2:59	

== RISE World Series 2026 Tokyo 2 ==
RISE World Series 2026 Tokyo 2
- Promotion: RISE
- Date: September 19, 2026
- Venue: Ebara Wave Arena Ota
- City: Tokyo, Japan

RISE World Series 2026 Tokyo 2 is a kickboxing event that will be held by RISE at the Ebara Wave Arena Ota in Tokyo, Japan on September 19, 2026.

=== Fight Card ===
RISE World Series 2026 Tokyo 2
Weight Class				Method	Round	Time	Notes
Super Flyweight 53 kg	(Japan) Ryujin Nasukawa	def.	(Japan) Kazuki Osaki (c)	Ext.R Decision (split)	6	3:00	For the RISE World Super Flyweight title
Super Lightweight 65 kg	(Japan) Yura	def.	(Japan) Taiju Shiratori (c)	KO (punches)	4	0:47	For the RISE Super Lightweight title
Flyweight 51.5 kg	(Japan) Tenshi Matsumoto (c)	def.	(Japan) Momu Tsukamoto	TKO (3 knockdowns)	2	2:30	For the RISE Flyweight title
Featherweight 57.5 kg	(Japan) Haruto Yasumoto	def.	(Thailand) Petchpayathai Sor.Poonsawat	KO (punches)	1	2:59	
Bantamweight 55 kg	(Japan) Ryu Hanaoka	def.	(Japan) Yusei Horimoto	Decision (unanimous)	3	3:00	
Bantamweight 55 kg	(Japan) Masahiko Suzuki	def.	(France) Djillali Kharroubi	Decision (unanimous)	3	3:00	
Bantamweight 55 kg	(Japan) Masashi Kumura	def.	(Japan) Atsuki Yamada	Ext.R Decision (unanimous)	4	3:00	
Bantamweight 55 kg	(Japan) Toki Oshika	def.	(Japan) Ryoya Ito	Decision (unanimous)	3	3:00	
Lightweight 62.5 kg	(Japan) Shota Okudaira	def.	(Japan) Yutaro Asahi	Ext.R Decision (unanimous)	4	3:00	
Preliminary Card
Flyweight 51.5 kg	(Japan) Yumeto Mizuno	def.	(Japan) Sora Koike	Decision (majority)	3	3:00	
Super Flyweight 53 kg	(Japan) Kodai Ono	def.	(Japan) Renji Inoue	KO (right cross)	1	1:44	
Super Featherweight 60 kg	(Japan) Soya Tanigawa	def.	(Japan) Ryunosuke Ishikawa	Decision (unanimous)	3	3:00	

== RISE 202 ==
RISE 202
- Promotion: RISE
- Date: October 17, 2026
- Venue: Korakuen Hall
- City: Tokyo, Japan

RISE 202 will be a kickboxing event held by RISE at the Korakuen Hall in Tokyo, Japan on October 17, 2026.

=== Fight Card ===
RISE 202
Weight Class				Method	Round	Time	Notes
Featherweight 57.5 kg	(Japan) Akito Nakashima	def.	(Japan) Ryunosuke Omori	TKO (3 knockdowns)	1	2:30	For the vacant RISE Featherweight Championship
Women's Flyweight 52 kg	(Netherlands) Tessa De Kom (c)	def.	(Japan) Yaya Weerasakreck	KO (knees)	4	0:11	For the RISE Women's Flyweight title
Middleweight 70 kg	(Japan) Kakushi Takagi	def.	(Japan) Hirokatsu Miyagi	Decision (unanimous)	3	3:00	
Welterweight 67.5 kg	(Japan) Ruka	def.	(Japan) Seiya	KO (left cross)	1	1:55	
Bantamweight 55 kg	(Japan) Musashi Matsushita	def.	(Japan) Tomoya Fukui	TKO (referee stoppage)	4	1:18	
Super Featherweight 60 kg	(Japan) Yusuke Iwaki	def.	(Japan) Seido	KO (low kick)	3	0:43	
Super Flyweight 53 kg	(Japan) Shion Masaki	def.	(Japan) Shuri Sakayori	KO (punches)	2	2:52	
Catchweight 62.5 kg	(Japan) Kinchan	draw.	(Japan) Tesshin Tarasaka	Decision (majority)	3	3:00	Open finger gloves
Flyweight 51.5 kg	(Japan) Kairi Yatagai	def.	(Japan) Bunta Kono	Decision (unanimous)	3	3:00	
Flyweight 51.5 kg	(Japan) Ayato	def.	(Japan) Oki	Decision (unanimous)	3	3:00	
Featherweight 57.5 kg	(Japan) Taisei Kako	def.	(Japan) Sosuke Kakamu	KO (knee)	3	2:03	

== RISE 203 ==
RISE 203
- Promotion: RISE
- Date: November 8, 2026
- Venue: Korakuen Hall
- City: Tokyo, Japan

RISE 203 will be a kickboxing event held by RISE at the Korakuen Hall in Tokyo, Japan on November 8, 2026.

=== Fight Card ===
RISE 203
Weight Class				Method	Round	Time	Notes
Super Flyweight 53 kg	(Japan) Jin Mandokoro	def.	(Japan) Riku Kazushima	Decision (unanimous)	5	3:00	For the vacant RISE Super Flyweight (-53 kg) title
Atomweight 46 kg	(Japan) Haruka Shimada	def.	(Japan) Mari	Decision (unanimous)	3	3:00	
Mini Flyweight 49 kg	(Thailand) Phayahong Banchamek	def.	(Japan) Mina Hayashi	KO (punches)	3	2:43	
Lightweight 62.5 kg	(Japan) Shota Okudaira	def.	(Japan) Kiyoto Takahashi	TKO (referee stoppage)	4	1:50	
Super Featherweight 60 kg	(Japan) Ryuto	def.	(Thailand) Panuwat TGT	Decision (unanimous)	3	3:00	
Super Lightweight 65 kg	(Japan) Taichi Nomura	def.	(Japan) Sumiya Ito	Decision (unanimous)	3	3:00	
Super Lightweight 65 kg	(Japan) Genki Morimoto	def.	(Japan) Yuya Kubota	Decision (unanimous)	3	3:00	
Welterweight 67.5 kg	(Japan) Teppei Wada	def.	(Japan) Hirotaka Kaneda	KO	2	1:55	
Featherweight 57.5 kg	(Japan) Yuga Hoshi	def.	(Japan) Saigo	KO (left hook)	2	0:45	
Atomweight 46 kg	(Japan) Honoka Kobayashi	def.	(Japan) Ran Iwamoto	Decision (unanimous)	3	3:00	
Flyweight 51.5 kg	(Japan) Shiryu Minamihara	def.	(Japan) Sora Koike	Decision (unanimous)	3	3:00	

== RISE World Series 2026 Tokyo Final ==
RISE World Series 2026 Tokyo Final
- Promotion: RISE
- Date: December 20, 2026
- Venue: Kanadevia Hall
- City: Tokyo, Japan

RISE World Series 2026 Tokyo Final will be a kickboxing event held by RISE at the Kanadevia Hall in Tokyo, Japan on December 20, 2026.

=== Fight Card ===
RISE World Series 2026 Tokyo Final
Weight Class				Method	Round	Time	Notes
Super Lightweight 65 kg	(Japan) Kento Haraguchi	vs.	(Colombia) Anderson Cano Perez				For the vacant RISE Super Lightweight World Championship
Featherweight 57.5 kg	(Japan) Haruto Yasumoto	vs.	(Thailand) Narak Banglong Auto Max				For the vacant RISE Featherweight World Championship
Catchweight 52 kg	(Japan) Tenshi Matsumoto	vs.	Jigsaw SitThailand				
Middleweight 70 kg	(Japan) Motoyasu	vs.	(Mexico) Abraham Vidales				
Bantamweight 55 kg	(Japan) Koki Osaki	vs.	(Japan) Masashi Kumura				RISE World Series -55kg Tournament, Quarterfinals
Bantamweight 55 kg	(Japan) Ryu Hanaoka	vs.	(Morocco) Akram Ouchibi				RISE World Series -55kg Tournament, Quarterfinals
Bantamweight 55 kg	(Japan) Masahiko Suzuki	vs.	(Thailand) Jaroensuk BoonlannaMuaythai				RISE World Series -55kg Tournament, Quarterfinals
Bantamweight 55 kg	(Japan) Toki Oshika	vs.	(Spain) Aymar Arias				RISE World Series -55kg Tournament, Quarterfinals
Bantamweight 55 kg	(Japan) Atsuki Yamada	vs.	(Japan) Yusei Horimoto				
Super Flyweight 53 kg	(Japan) Ryunosuke Ito	vs.	(Japan) Kodai Ono				
Lightweight 62.5 kg	(Japan) Ryuya Koide	vs.	(Japan) Yuga Sakura				
Flyweight 51.5 kg	(Japan) Kotaro Hayashi	vs.	(Japan) Kairi Yatagai				
Welterweight 67.5 kg	(Japan) Aito	vs.	(Japan) Ryuki Kaneko				
Bantamweight 55 kg	(Japan) Keito Kanayama	vs.	(Japan) Soshi Kaneshiro				

== See also ==
- 2026 in K-1
- 2026 in ONE Championship
- 2026 in Romanian kickboxing
- 2026 in Wu Lin Feng
- 2026 in Glory
