= Ryujin Nasukawa =

Japanese kickboxer

- Born: 那須川龍心; May 16, 2006 (age 20); Chiba, Japan
- Height: 165 cm (5 ft 5 in)
- Weight: 53.0 kg (116.8 lb; 8.35 st)
- Style: Kickboxing
- Stance: Orthodox
- Fighting out of: Tokyo, Japan
- Team: Team TEPPEN
- Trainer: Hiroyuki Nasukawa

Kickboxing record
- Total: 23
- Wins: 20
- By knockout: 10
- Losses: 3

Other information
- Notable relatives: Tenshin Nasukawa (older brother)

Ryujin Nasukawa (born May 16, 2006) is a Japanese kickboxer. He is the reigning ISKA K-1 World Strawweight champion and RISE Super Flyweight World champion.

As of October 2024, he was the #10 ranked -53 kg kickboxer in the world according to Beyond Kickboxing.

== Kickboxing career ==
=== Early career ===
Nasukawa made his professional debut on April 4, 2022, at RISE ELDORADO 2022 where he defeated Naoki Kasahara by unanimous decision.

For his second professional fight Nasukawa was scheduled to face Rui Okubo on the exceptional card THE MATCH 2022 on June 19, 2022, at the Tokyo Dome. Nasukawa lost the fight by unanimous decision.

Nasukawa took part in a four-man one night tournament called "New Warriors" on February 23, 2023, at RISE 166. In the semifinals he faced Momu Tsukamoto who defeated him by unanimous decision.

On August 26, 2023, Nasukawa faced Jin at RISE WORLD SERIES 2023 - 2nd Round. He won the fight by unanimous decision.

On December 16, 2023, Nasukawa faced Ryutaro at RISE WORLD SERIES 2023 Final Round. He won the fight by doctor stoppage in the third round.

On March 17, 2024, Nasukawa faced Tenshi Matsumoto at RISE ELDORADO 2024. He won the fight by unanimous decision.

On June 15, 2024, Nasukawa faced Momu Tsukamoto at RISE WORLD SERIES 2024 OSAKA. He won the fight by spit decision.

=== RISE Flyweight champion ===
Nasukawa was scheduled to challenge Riku Kazushima for his RISE Flyweight title on November 23, 2024, at RISE 183.

Nasukawa faced Petmai MC.SuperlekMuaythai at RISE WORLD SERIES 2024 Final on December 21, 2024. He won the fight by a second-round knockout.

Nasukawa faced Hamada Azmani for the inaugural ISKA K-1 World Strawweight (-51.5 kg) title at RISE WORLD SERIES 2025 Yokohama on June 21, 2025. He won the fight by unanimous decision to capture the title.

Nasukawa moved up to super flyweight (-53 kg) to face the #1 ranked RISE super flyweight contender Jin Mandokoro at RISE WORLD SERIES 2025 Tokyo on August 2, 2025. He won the fight by unanimous decision.

Nasukawa faced Yuto Uemura at RISE 195 on January 18, 2026. He won the fight by a first-round technical knockout.

== Mixed martial arts career ==
Nasukawa made his mixed martial arts debut at Rizin 45 on December 31, 2023, against Jongmin Shin. He won the fight by second-round knockout.

== Titles and accomplishments ==
=== Professional ===
- RISE
  - 2024 RISE Flyweight (-51.5 kg) Champion
  - 2024 RISE Fighter of the Year
  - 2025 RISE Knockout of the Year (vs. Kumandoi Petchyindee Academy)
  - 2026 RISE Super Flyweight (-53 kg) Champion
  - 2026 RISE Super Flyweight (-53 kg) World Champion
- International Sport Kickboxing Association
  - 2025 ISKA K-1 World Strawweight (-51.5 kg) Champion

Awards

- efight.jp
  - Fighter of the Month (November 2024)

=== Amateur ===
- 2015 Amateur Dageki Kakutougi Japan Cup K-4 Tournament Runner-up
- 2016 Shin Karate Tokyo Tournament Elementary School Winner
- 2016 Amateur Dageki Kakutougi Japan Cup K-4 Tournament Third Place
- 2016 NJKF Explosion -31 kg Champion
- 2017 Bigbang -34 kg Champion
- 2017 KAMINARIMON All Japan Tournament -35 kg Champion
- 2018 NJKF Explosion -34 kg Champion
- 2018 Shootboxing All Japan Tournament -40 kg Champion
- 2018 RIZIN x KAMINARIMON Junior Tournament -35 kg runner-up
- 2019 NJKF Explosion Elementary School -40 kg Champion
- 2019 Bigbang -40 kg Champion
- 2019 Bigbang -45 kg Champion
- 2021 RISE NOVA Junior A-class -50 kg Tournament Winner
- 2021 Amateur Dageki Kakutougi Japan Cup Middle School -50 kg Champion
- 2021 RISE NOVA All Japan Tournament -55 kg Champion
- 2021 Stand Up Kickboxing A-class -45 kg Champion

== Mixed martial arts record ==
Professional record breakdown
| 1 match | 1 win | 0 losses |
| By knockout | 1 | 0 |

| Res. | Record | Opponent | Method | Event | Date | Round | Time | Location | Notes |
|---|---|---|---|---|---|---|---|---|---|
| Win | 1-0 | Jongmin Shin | TKO (punches) | Rizin 45 | December 31, 2023 | 1 | 2:16 | Saitama, Japan | |

== Kickboxing record ==
Professional Kickboxing Record
20 Wins (10 (T)KO's), 3 Losses, 0 Draw, 0 No Contest
| Date | Result | Opponent | Event | Location | Method | Round | Time |
| 2026-11-18 | Win | (Japan) Raichi Nagai | ONE Samurai 5 | Tokyo, Japan | KO (right cross) | 1 | 0:36 |
| 2026-09-19 | Win | (Japan) Kazuki Osaki | RISE World Series 2026 Tokyo 2 | Tokyo, Japan | Ext.R Decision (split) | 6 | 3:00 |
Won the RISE World Super Flyweight (-53 kg) title.
| 2026-07-24 | Win | (Thailand) Thongpoon P.K.Saenchai | ONE: The Inner Circle 23, Lumpinee Stadium | Bangkok, Thailand | TKO (knee and punches) | 2 | 2:00 |
| 2026-06-06 | Loss | (Japan) Kazuki Osaki | RISE World Series 2026 Tokyo | Tokyo, Japan | Ext.R Decision (unanimous) | 4 | 3:00 |
| 2026-03-28 | Win | (Japan) Kaito Hasegawa | RISE ELDORADO 2026 | Tokyo, Japan | TKO (3 knockdowns) | 5 | 1:17 |
Won the vacant RISE Super Flyweight (-53 kg) title.
| 2026-01-18 | Win | (Japan) Yuto Uemura | RISE 195 | Tokyo, Japan | TKO (punches) | 1 | 2:24 |
| 2025-10-30 | Win | (Thailand) Chalamdam Nayokathasala | Kickboxing Fes. GOAT | Tokyo, Japan | KO (spinning back kick to the body) | 1 | 1:38 |
| 2025-08-02 | Win | (Japan) Jin Mandokoro | RISE WORLD SERIES 2025 Tokyo | Tokyo, Japan | Decision (unanimous) | 3 | 3:00 |
| 2025-06-21 | Win | (Morocco) Hamada Azmani | RISE WORLD SERIES 2025 Yokohama | Yokohama, Japan | Decision (unanimous) | 3 | 3:00 |
Won the inaugural ISKA K-1 World Strawweight (-51.5 kg) title.
| 2025-03-29 | Win | (Thailand) Kumandoi Petchyindee Academy | RISE ELDORADO 2025 | Tokyo, Japan | TKO (3 knockdowns) | 2 | 2:39 |
| 2024-12-21 | Win | (Thailand) Petmai MC.SuperlekMuaythai | RISE WORLD SERIES 2024 Final | Chiba, Japan | KO (knee to the body) | 2 | 2:06 |
| 2024-11-23 | Win | (Japan) Riku Kazushima | RISE 183 | Tokyo, Japan | TKO (left hook) | 1 | 2:12 |
Won the RISE Flyweight (-51.5 kg) title.
| 2024-09-08 | Win | (South Korea) Jong Min Shin | RISE WORLD SERIES 2024 YOKOHAMA | Yokohama, Japan | KO (left hook to the body) | 2 | 0:27 |
| 2024-06-15 | Win | (Japan) Momu Tsukamoto | RISE WORLD SERIES 2024 OSAKA | Osaka, Japan | Decision (split) | 3 | 3:00 |
| 2024-03-17 | Win | (Japan) Tenshi Matsumoto | RISE ELDORADO 2024 | Tokyo, Japan | Decision (unanimous) | 3 | 3:00 |
| 2023-12-16 | Win | (Japan) Ryutaro | RISE WORLD SERIES 2023 Final Round | Tokyo, Japan | TKO (doctor stoppage) | 3 | 2:04 |
| 2023-08-26 | Win | (Japan) Jin | RISE WORLD SERIES 2023 - 2nd Round | Tokyo, Japan | Decision (unanimous) | 3 | 3:00 |
| 2023-06-23 | Win | (Japan) Jo Aizawa | RISE 169 | Tokyo, Japan | Decision (unanimous) | 3 | 3:00 |
| 2023-02-23 | Loss | (Japan) Momu Tsukamoto | RISE 166 - New Warriors Tournament, Semifinals | Tokyo, Japan | Decision (unanimous) | 3 | 3:00 |
| 2022-12-25 | Win | (Japan) Kojiro Shiba | RISE WORLD SERIES / SHOOTBOXING-KINGS 2022 | Tokyo, Japan | Decision (majority) | 3 | 3:00 |
| 2022-08-28 | Win | (Japan) Ryoma Hirayama | RISE 161 | Tokyo, Japan | TKO (referee stoppage) | 3 | |
| 2022-06-19 | Loss | (Japan) Rui Okubo | THE MATCH 2022 | Tokyo, Japan | Decision (unanimous) | 3 | 3:00 |
| 2022-04-02 | Win | (Japan) Naoki Kasahara | RISE ELDORADO 2022 | Tokyo, Japan | Decision (unanimous) | 3 | 3:00 |
Legend: Win Loss Draw/No contest Notes

=== Amateur record ===
Amateur Kickboxing record
around 80 Wins, 10 Losses, 10 Draws
| Date | Result | Opponent | Event | Location | Method | Round | Time |
| 2021-12-26 | Win | (Japan) Takumi Hoshi | 2021 Stand up Kickboxing Amateur Championship, Final | Tokyo, Japan | Decision (Majority) | 1 | 3:00 |
Wins 2021 Stand up Kickboxing A-class -55kg title.
| 2021-12-26 | Win | (Japan) Hiroto Hayashi | 2021 Stand up Kickboxing Amateur Championship, Semifinals | Tokyo, Japan | Decision (Unanimous) | 1 | 3:00 |
| 2021-12-05 | Win | (Japan) Takumi Hoshi | RISE NOVA All Japan Championship, Final | Tokyo, Japan | Decision (Unanimous) | 2 | 2:00 |
Wins 2021 RISE NOVA All Japan -55kg title.
| 2021-12-05 | Win | (Japan) Yuto Nomura | RISE NOVA All Japan Championship, Semifinals | Tokyo, Japan | Decision (Majority) | 1 | 3:00 |
| 2021-12-05 | Win | (Japan) Ryunosuke Ito | RISE NOVA All Japan Championship, Quarterfinals | Tokyo, Japan | Decision (Unanimous) | 1 | 3:00 |
| 2021-09-23 | Win | (Japan) Tensuke Yamazaki | RISE WORLD SERIES 2021 Yokohama | Yokohama, Japan | Decision (Unanimous) | 2 | 2:00 |
| 2021-08-08 | Win | (Japan) Kizuna Morikawa | Stand up Amateur in TOKYO vol.5 | Tokyo, Japan | Decision (Unanimous) | 1 | 2:00 |
| 2021-07-04 | Win | (Japan) Yuto Wada | DEEP☆KICK 54 | Osaka, Japan | Decision (Unanimous) | 3 | 1:00 |
| 2021-03-20 | Win | (Japan) Reo Tsukada | Amateur Dageki Kakutougi Japan Cup 2021, Final | Tokyo, Japan | Decision (Unanimous) | 1 | 2:00 |
Wins 2021 Japan Cup Middle School -50kg title.
| 2021-03-20 | Win | (Japan) Shikou Chinen | Amateur Dageki Kakutougi Japan Cup 2021, Semifinals | Tokyo, Japan | Decision | 1 | 2:00 |
| 2021-02-07 | Win | (Japan) Ryusei Suzuki | RISE NOVA, Final | Tokyo, Japan | Decision (Unanimous) | 2 | 2:00 |
Wins RISE NOVA Junior A-class -50kg Tournament title.
| 2021-02-07 | Win | (Japan) Jo Aizawa | RISE NOVA, Semifinals | Tokyo, Japan | Decision (Unanimous) | 2 | 2:00 |
| 2021-02-07 | Win | (Japan) Ryuki Kawano | RISE NOVA, Quarterfinals | Tokyo, Japan | Decision (Unanimous) | 2 | 2:00 |
| 2020-12-13 | Loss | (Japan) Momu Tsukamoto | DEEP KICK 48-49 | Osaka, Japan | Decision (Unanimous) | 3 | 1:30 |
| 2020-10-03 | Win | (Japan) Takumi Hoshi | RISE NOVA | Tokyo, Japan | Decision (Majority) | 2 | 2:00 |
| 2020-10-04 | Draw | (Japan) Minato Yamazaki | RISE NOVA | Tokyo, Japan | Decision | 2 | 2:00 |
| 2020-07-26 | Loss | (Japan) Sento Ito | DEEP KICK 44 | Osaka, Japan | Decision (Unanimous) | 2 | 2:00 |
| 2020-02-02 | Loss | (Japan) Riku Otsu | KAMINARIMON | Tokyo, Japan | Decision (Unanimous) | 2 | 2:00 |
| 2019-11-24 | Loss | (Japan) Sento Ito | DEEP KICK 41 | Osaka, Japan | Decision (Unanimous) | 2 | 2:00 |
| 2019-10-06 | Win | (Japan) Sakura Soga | KAMINARIMON | Tokyo, Japan | KO | 2 | |
| 2019-10-06 | Win | (Japan) Osuke Seki | KAMINARIMON | Tokyo, Japan | TKO (Punches) | 2 | |
| 2019-09-08 | | (Japan) Yuto Nagasu | Bigbang Amateur | Tokyo, Japan | | | |
| 2019-09-08 | | (Japan) Tsubasa Nio | Bigbang Amateur | Tokyo, Japan | | | |
| 2019-08-04 | Win | (Japan) Teito Uchida | KAMINARIMON | Tokyo, Japan | Decision (Unanimous) | | |
| 2019-08-04 | Win | (Japan) Kanenao Sugimoto | KAMINARIMON | Tokyo, Japan | Decision (Unanimous) | | |
| 2019-07-14 | | (Japan) Toki Oshika | Bigbang Amateur | Tokyo, Japan | | | |
| 2019-05-12 | Draw | (Japan) Toki Oshika | KAMINARIMON | Tokyo, Japan | Decision | 2 | 2:00 |
| 2019-04-14 | Win | (Japan) Yuushin Kikuma | KAMINARIMON | Tokyo, Japan | Decision (Unanimous) | | |
| 2019-03-11 | Win | (England) | 6th World Muay Boran Federation Amateur Championship | Thailand | Decision | 3 | 1:00 |
| 2019-02-24 | Draw | (Japan) Retsuki Oshika | KAMINARIMON | Tokyo, Japan | Decision | | |
| 2019-01-20 | Win | (Japan) Masato Shigano | NJKF EXPLOSION 19 | Tokyo, Japan | Decision | 3 | 1:00 |
Wins NJKF Explosion Elementary School -40kg title.
| 2018-12-30 | Loss | (Japan) Riamu Matsumoto | RIZIN x KAMINARIMON Junior -35 kg Tournament, Final | Tokyo, Japan | Ext.R Decision (Unanimous) | | |
| 2018-12-30 | Win | (Japan) Kaoru Kitaguni | RIZIN x KAMINARIMON Junior -35 kg Tournament, Semifinals | Tokyo, Japan | Decision (Unanimous) | | |
| 2018-12-30 | Win | (Japan) Aiki Oshika | RIZIN x KAMINARIMON Junior -35 kg Tournament, Quarterfinals | Tokyo, Japan | Decision (Unanimous) | | |
| 2018-12-16 | Win | (Japan) Kohaku Yokoyama | Shootboxing All Japan Amateur 2018 in Hanayashiki, Final | Tokyo, Japan | Decision | | |
Wins Shootboxing All Japan Junior -40kg title.
| 2018-12-16 | Win | (Japan) Reo Hendo | Shootboxing All Japan Amateur 2018 in Hanayashiki, Semi Final | Tokyo, Japan | Decision | | |
| 2018-12-02 | Loss | (Japan) Shoki Hoshikubo | KAMINARIMON All Japan Tournament, -40 kg Semi Final | Tokyo, Japan | Decision (Unanimous) | | |
| 2018-10-21 | Draw | (Japan) Tsubasa Nio | KAMINARIMON | Tokyo, Japan | Decision | | |
| 2018-08-05 | Draw | (Japan) Minato Yamazaki | KAMINARIMON | Tokyo, Japan | Decision | | |
| 2018-07-15 | Loss | (Japan) Riamu Matsumoto | Bigbang Amateur | Tokyo, Japan | Decision (Unanimous) | 2 | 1:30 |
| 2018-06-03 | Win | (Japan) Kaoru Kitaguni | RISE ZERO KAMINARIMON | Tokyo, Japan | Decision (Majority) | | |
| 2018-05-12 | Draw | (Japan) Aiki Oshika | KAMINARIMON | Tokyo, Japan | Decision | | |
| 2018-04-08 | Win | (Japan) Tesshin Takeda | Bigbang Amateur | Tokyo, Japan | Decision | 2 | 1:30 |
Defends Bigbang Amateur -34kg title.
| 2018-03-04 | Win | (Japan) Isana Sato | BOUT 31 | Sapporo, Japan | Decision (Unanimous) | 2 | 1:30 |
| 2018-02-18 | Draw | (Japan) Ryuma Nagai | Bigbang Amateur | Tokyo, Japan | Decision | 3 | 1:30 |
Defends Bigbang Amateur -34kg title.
| 2018-02-04 | Win | (Japan) Raisei Hakkaku | NJKF EXPLOSION 14 | Tokyo, Japan | Decision | 2 | 1:30 |
Wins NJKF EXPLOSION U-15 -34kg title.
| 2017-12-10 | Win | (Japan) Shota Kunioka | KAMINARIMON All Japan 35 kg Tournament, Final | Tokyo, Japan | Decision (Split) | | |
Wins KAMINARIMON All Japan Tournament -35kg title.
| 2017-12-10 | Win | (Japan) Kaoru Kitaguni | KAMINARIMON All Japan 35 kg Tournament, Semifinals | Tokyo, Japan | Decision (Unanimous) | | |
| 2017-12-10 | Win | (Japan) Kai Wakahara | KAMINARIMON All Japan 35 kg Tournament, Quarterfinals | Tokyo, Japan | Decision (Unanimous) | | |
| 2017-12-03 | Win | (Japan) Ryuma Nagai | Bigbang Amateur | Tokyo, Japan | Decision | 3 | 1:30 |
Defends Bigbang Amateur -34kg title.
| 2017-10-01 | Win | (Japan) Tsugumi Hirai | KAMINARIMON | Tokyo, Japan | Decision (Unanimous) | 2 | 2:00 |
| 2017-09-03 | Win | (Japan) Takumi Ishiwara | Bigbang Amateur | Tokyo, Japan | Decision | 3 | 1:30 |
Wins Bigbang Amateur -34kg title.
| 2017-08-06 | Win | (Japan) Yuta Shibasaki | KAMINARIMON | Tokyo, Japan | Decision | 2 | 2:00 |
| 2017-08-06 | Win | (Japan) Tsugumi Hirai | KAMINARIMON | Tokyo, Japan | Decision (Unanimous) | 2 | 2:00 |
| 2017-07-09 | Win | (Japan) Kosuke Ikegami | Bigbang Amateur | Tokyo, Japan | Decision (Unanimous) | 2 | 1:30 |
| 2017-07-02 | Loss | (Japan) Aiki Oshika | NJKF EXPLOSION 11 | Tokyo, Japan | Decision | 3 | 1:30 |
| 2017-06-04 | Win | (Japan) Kou Osano | KAMINARIMON | Tokyo, Japan | Decision (Unanimous) | | |
| 2017-06-04 | Draw | (Japan) Yoshiaki Kikuchi | KAMINARIMON | Tokyo, Japan | Decision (Unanimous) | | |
| 2016-07-10 | Draw | (Japan) Koshi Soga | Bigbang Amateur | Tokyo, Japan | Decision (Unanimous) | 2 | 1:30 |
| 2016-04-09 | Win | (Japan) Sei Aizawa | KAMINARIMON | Tokyo, Japan | Decision (Unanimous) | | |
| 2017-04-02 | Win | (Japan) Sora Sugiyama | Bigbang Amateur | Tokyo, Japan | Decision (Unanimous) | 2 | 1:30 |
| 2017-02-12 | Loss | (Japan) Ryoma Nagai | NJKF EXPLOSION 11 | Tokyo, Japan | Decision | 3 | 1:30 |
Loses NJKF EXPLOSION -31kg title.
| 2016-10-30 | Win | (Japan) Kairen Takahashi | NJKF EXPLOSION 7 | Tokyo, Japan | Decision | 2 | 1:00 |
| 2016-10-09 | Loss | (Japan) Toki Oshika | KAMINARIMON | Tokyo, Japan | Decision (Unanimous) | 2 | 2:00 |
| 2016-07-23 | Loss | (Japan) Taisei Nakano | 2nd WBC Muay Thai Jr League Tournament, Semifinals | Tokyo, Japan | Decision | | |
| 2016-07-10 | Win | (Japan) Kiryu Murai | Bigbang Amateur 35 | Tokyo, Japan | Decision (Unanimous) | 2 | 1:30 |
| 2016-07-10 | Draw | (Japan) Koshi Soga | Bigbang Amateur 35 | Tokyo, Japan | Decision | 2 | 1:30 |
| 2016-06-12 | Win | (Japan) Natsuki Kawaura | KAMINARIMON | Tokyo, Japan | Decision (Unanimous) | | |
| 2016-06-05 | Win | (Japan) Aino Baba | REBELS Amateur | Tokyo, Japan | Decision (Unanimous) | | |
| 2016-06-05 | Draw | (Japan) Kaoru Kitaguni | REBELS Amateur | Tokyo, Japan | Decision | | |
| 2016-05-15 | Win | (Japan) Ryoma Nagai | NJKF EXPLOSION 5 - Championship Tournament, Final | Tokyo, Japan | Decision | 2 | 1:30 |
Wins inaugural NJKF EXPLOSION U15 -31kg title.
| 2016-05-15 | Win | (Japan) Wakabayashi | NJKF EXPLOSION 5 - Championship Tournament, SemifInals | Tokyo, Japan | Decision | 2 | 1:30 |
| 2016-04-17 | Win | (Japan) Toranosuke Uesaka | KAMINARIMON | Tokyo, Japan | Decision (Unanimous) | | |
Legend: Win Loss Draw/No contest Notes
