= Tenshi Matsumoto =

Japanese kickboxer

- Born: 松本 天志; April 24, 2004 (age 22); Ishikawa Prefecture, Japan
- Height: 168 cm (5 ft 6 in)
- Weight: 53 kg (117 lb; 8.3 st)
- Style: Karate, Kickboxing
- Stance: Southpaw
- Fighting out of: Kanazawa, Japan
- Team: Hawk Gym (2021-2023); Target Shibuya (2024-Present)
- Years active: 2021-present

Kickboxing record
- Total: 19
- Wins: 15
- By knockout: 7
- Losses: 4
- By knockout: 0
- Draws: 0

Tenshi Matsumoto (Japanese: 松本天志, Matsumoto Tenshi; born April 24, 2004) is a Japanese kickboxer, currently competing in the RISE promotion where he is the reigning Flyweight (-51.5 kg) Champion.

As of June 2025, he was the #8 ranked -53 kg kickboxer in the world by Beyond Kickboxing.

== Kickboxing career ==
Matsumoto faced the undefeated Yuga Hoshi in the semifinals of the 2021 Standup "King of the Rookie" tournament, held at Stand up Kickboxing vol.5 on October 24, 2021. He won the fight by unanimous decision, with scores of 30–27, 30—28 and 29–27. Matsumoto knocked his opponent down with a high kick in the second round, which took place shortly after a break due to an accidental clash of heads, which proved essential on two of the judges' scorecards. Matsumoto next faced the once-defeated Hyuga Umemoto in the tournament finals at Stand Up Kickboxing vol.7 on December 26, 2021. He lost the fight by unanimous decision, with all three judges' awarding Hyuga a 28—26 scorecard. Matsumoto was twice knocked down: with a left straight to a right hook combination in the second round and a flurry of strikes near the end of the third round.

During an in-ring presentation held by the promotion of January 29, 2023, it was announced that Matsumoto would be one of four participants of the 2023 RISE "New Warriors" Warriors tournament, alongside Kuryu, Ryujin Nasukawa and Momu Tsukamoto, with Matsumoto stating during his in-ring presentation: "I don't think many people think I'll win this tournament, but I will definitely overcome the odds". Aside from the title, the winner would also be awarded 1 million yen in prize money. Tsukamoto faced Kuryu in the semifinals of the one-day tournament at RISE 166 "RISE 20th Memorial event", held on February 23, 2023. He won the fight by unanimous decision and advanced to the finals, where he faced Momu Tsukamoto. Matsumoto knocked his opponent down twice in the first 46 seconds of the final round, which resulted in an automatic technical knockout victory under the RISE tournament rules.

Matsumoto faced Futa Dangan at RISE 170 on July 30, 2023. He won the fight by a first-round knockout, flooring Dangan with a left cross 46 seconds into the fight. In his post-fight speech, Matsumoto stated: "...Tamaru has already been scheduled to fight, so I'd like to fight the number one ranked fighter Riku Kazushima". The promotion acquiesced and booked a fight between the pair, with the vacant RISE Flyweight (-51.5 kg) title on the line, for RISE 172 on October 29, 2023. Kazushima won the fight by unanimous decision, with scores of 49–48, 49—48 and 50–48.

Matsumoto, at the time the top-ranked RISE flyweight, faced the fourth-ranked Ryujin Nasukawa at RISE ELDORADO 2024 on March 17, 2024. He lost the fight by unanimous decision, with scores of 30–28, 30—28 and 29–28.

Matsumoto faced JIN at RISE 181 on August 31, 2024. He won the fight by a first-round knockout. Matsumoto followed this victory up with a unanimous decision triumph over Reiya at RISE 184 on December 15, 2024, with three scorecards of 30–28 in his favor.

Matsumoto faced Riku Kazushima at RISE 186 on February 23, 2025, in a rematch of their RISE 172 bout. Kazushima once again won the fight by unanimous decision, with scores of 30–27, 30—26 and 28–27. Matsumoto was knocked down twice in the opening round.

== Titles and accomplishments ==
=== Kickboxing ===
Professional

- RISE
  - 2023 RISE New Warriors -51.5 kg Tournament Winner
  - 2026 RISE Flyweight (-51.5 kg) Champion
    - One successful title defense

Amateur

- 2018 Dageki Kakutougi Japan Cup -45 kg Runner-up
- 2019 TOP RUN -45 kg Champion
- 2019 Dageki Kakutougi Japan Cup -50 kg Runner-up
- 2019 RISE NOVA All Japan Championship Junior -50 kg Champion
- 2021 Dageki Kakutougi Japan Cup -55 kg Runner-up

=== Karate ===
- 2014 IBKO All Japan Championship Elementary School Winner
- 2016 IBKO Hokuriko Championship Elementary School Winner
- 2015 Seidokaikan All Japan Junior Championship -35 kg Winner
- 2015 Shiknyokushin All Japan Championship -35 kg Winner
- 2015 JKF All Japan Junior Elementary School Winner
- 2016 Shin Karate Japan Cup Elementary School -37 kg Runner-up
- 2x IBKO All Japan Championship Middle School Winner (2016, 2017)
- 2017 Shinkyokushin All Japan Championship Middle School 1st Year Lightweight Winner
- 2x Shin Karate All Japan K-4 Grand Prix Lightweight Champion (2016, 2017)
- 2017 WKO Nihonkai Cup Middle School First Year -50 kg Champion
- 2017 IKO Kitashinetsu Championship Middle School 1st Year Lightweight Winner
- 2018 Shin Karate K-3 Kyoto Tournament Middle School -45 kg Winner
- 2018 JKJO All Tokai Championship Middle School -50 kg Winner
- 2x Shin Karate All Japan K-3 Grand Prix Middle School Runner-up (2018, 2019)

== Fight record ==
Professional Kickboxing record
15 Wins (7 (T)KO's), 4 Losses, 0 Draw, 0 No Contest
Date	Result	Opponent	Event	Location	Method	Round	Time
2026-12-20		Jigsaw SitThailand	RISE World Series 2026 Tokyo Final	Tokyo, Japan			
2026-09-19	Win	(Japan) Momu Tsukamoto	RISE World Series 2026 Tokyo 2	Tokyo, Japan	TKO (3 knockdowns)	2	2:30
Defended the RISE Flyweight (-51.5 kg) title.
2026-02-23	Win	(Japan) Sora Tanazawa	RISE 196	Tokyo, Japan	Decision (unanimous)	5	3:00
Won the vacant RISE Flyweight (-51.5 kg) title.
2025-11-02	Win	(Japan) Momu Tsukamoto	RISE World Series 2025 Final	Tokyo, Japan	Decision (majority)	3	3:00
2025-06-29	Win	(Japan) Yuto Hirayama	RISE 189	Tokyo, Japan	Decision (unanimous)	3	3:00
2025-02-23	Loss	(Japan) Riku Kazushima	RISE 186	Tokyo, Japan	Decision (unanimous)	3	3:00
2024-12-15	Win	(Japan) Reiya	RISE 184	Tokyo, Japan	Decision (unanimous)	3	3:00
2024-08-31	Win	(Japan) Jin	RISE 181	Tokyo, Japan	KO (left cross)	1	2:37
2024-06-30	Win	(Japan) Yuki Kishi	RISE 179	Tokyo, Japan	KO (left hook)	1	1:04
2024-03-17	Loss	(Japan) Ryujin Nasukawa	RISE ELDORADO 2024	Tokyo, Japan	Decision (unanimous)	3	3:00
2023-10-29	Loss	(Japan) Riku Kazushima	RISE 172	Tokyo, Japan	Decision (unanimous)	5	3:00
For the vacant RISE Flyweight (-51.5 kg) title.
2023-07-30	Win	(Japan) Futa Dangan	RISE 170	Tokyo, Japan	KO (left cross)	1	0:58
2023-02-23	Win	(Japan) Momu Tsukamoto	RISE 166 New Warriors Tournament, Final	Tokyo, Japan	TKO (referee stoppage)	3	0:46
Won the 2023 RISE New Warriors -51.5kg Tournament title.
2023-02-23	Win	(Japan) Ryuta Suekuni	RISE 166 New Warriors Tournament, Semi Final	Tokyo, Japan	Decision (unanimous)	3	3:00
2022-12-10	Win	(Japan) Novo	RISE 163	Tokyo, Japan	KO (left cross)	2	0:27
2022-07-29	Win	(Japan) Yuzuki Sakai	RISE 160	Tokyo, Japan	Decision (unanimous)	3	3:00
2022-03-27	Win	(Japan) Kojiro Shiba	RISE 156	Tokyo, Japan	Decision (unanimous)	3	3:00
2021-12-26	Loss	(Japan) Hyuga Umemoto	Stand Up Kickboxing vol.7 - King of Rookie Tournament Final	Tokyo, Japan	Decision (unanimous)	3	3:00
For the 2021 Stand Up Kickboxing King of Rookie -53kg title.
2021-10-24	Win	(Japan) Yuga Hoshi	Stand up Kickboxing vol.5 - King of Rookie Tournament Semi Final	Tokyo, Japan	Decision (unanimous)	3	3:00
2021-08-28	Win	(Japan) Rui Nojima	RISE EVOL 8	Tokyo, Japan	KO (punches)	3	2:41
Legend: Win Loss Draw/No contest Notes

=== Amateur record ===
Amateur Kickboxing record
Date	Result	Opponent	Event	Location	Method	Round	Time
2021-03-20	Loss	(Japan) Rui Okubo	Amateur Dageki Kakutougi Japan Cup 2021, Final	Tokyo, Japan	Decision (unanimous)	2	2:00
For the 2021 Japan Cup -55kg title.
2021-03-20	Win	(Japan) Ryoya Ito	Amateur Dageki Kakutougi Japan Cup 2021, Semi Final	Tokyo, Japan	Decision (unanimous)	1	3:00
2021-03-20	Win	(Japan) Kohei Inomata	Amateur Dageki Kakutougi Japan Cup 2021, Quarter Final	Tokyo, Japan	Decision (unanimous)	1	3:00
2021-03-07	Win	(Japan) Ryu Matsunaga	Stand up Amateur in Tokyo vol.3	Tokyo, Japan	Decision (unanimous)	2	
2020-12-06	Win	(Japan) Hiroyuki Muroya	Stand up Amateur in Kyoto vol.1	Kyoto, Japan	KO		
2020-11-23	Win	(Japan) Tsukasa Osafune	NEXT LEVEL Kansai 68	Sakai, Japan	Decision (unanimous)	2	1:30
2020-09-20	Win	(Japan) Tatsuto Kawatsuka	NEXT LEVEL Chushikoku 38	Kurashiki, Japan	TKO	1	
2019-12-08	Win	(Japan) Jo Aizawa	KAMINARIMON - All Japan Championship Tournament Final	Tokyo, Japan	Decision (unanimous)		
Wins RISE NOVA All Japan Junior -50kg title.
2019-12-08	Win	(Japan) Yuto Nomura	KAMINARIMON - All Japan Championship Tournament Semi Final	Tokyo, Japan	Decision (unanimous)		
2019-12-08	Win	(Japan) Kiyoto Ohno	KAMINARIMON - All Japan Championship Tournament Quarter Final	Tokyo, Japan	KO	1	
2019-10-27	Loss	(Japan) Ryunosuke Saito	Amateur Dageki Kakutougi Japan Cup 2019, Final	Tokyo, Japan	Ext.R Decision	2	1:30
For the 2019 Japan Cup Middle School -50kg title.
2019-10-27	Win	(Japan) Shunsuke	Amateur Dageki Kakutougi Japan Cup 2019, Semi Final	Tokyo, Japan			
2019-09-29	Win	(Japan) Towa Toyoda	NEXT LEVEL Chushikoku 34	Kurashiki, Japan	TKO	1	
2019-08-04	Win	(Japan) Kiyoto Ohno	KAMINARIMON	Tokyo, Japan	Decision (unanimous)	2	2:00
2019-08-04	Win	(Japan) Hiroaki Obara	KAMINARIMON	Tokyo, Japan	Decision (unanimous)	2	2:00
2019-06-23	Win	(Japan) Hiroto Hayashi	NJKF 2019 west 3rd	Osaka, Japan	Decision (unanimous)	3	2:00
Wins TOP RUN -45kg title.
2019-04-29	Win	(Japan) Daiki Kobayashi	NEXT LEVEL Kansai 55, Final	Sakai, Japan	Decision (unanimous)	2	2:00
2019-04-29	Win	(Japan) Toki Harada	NEXT LEVEL Kansai 55, Semi Final	Sakai, Japan	Decision (unanimous)	2	2:00
2018-12-09	Win	(Japan) Shinnosuke Kotani	NEXT LEVEL Kansai 52	Sakai, Japan	Decision (unanimous)	2	2:00
2018-12-09	Win	(Japan) Atsuya Kinosada	NEXT LEVEL Kansai 52	Sakai, Japan	Decision (majority)	2	2:00
2018-10-21	Loss	(Japan) Ryunosuke Saito	Amateur Dageki Kakutougi Japan Cup 2018, Final	Tokyo, Japan	Ext.R Decision	2	1:30
For the 2018 Japan Cup Middle School -45kg title.
2018-10-21	Win	(Japan) Hiroaki Obara	Amateur Dageki Kakutougi Japan Cup 2018, Semi Final	Tokyo, Japan			
Legend: Win Loss Draw/No contest Notes

== See also ==
- List of male kickboxers
