= Kaito Hasegawa =

Japanese kickboxer

- Born: 長谷川海翔; July 2, 2005 (age 21); Himeji, Japan
- Height: 170 cm (5 ft 7 in)
- Weight: 53 kg (117 lb; 8.3 st)
- Style: Kickboxing
- Stance: Southpaw
- Fighting out of: Osaka, Japan
- Team: Seigokan
- Trainer: Kengo Takayama

Kickboxing record
- Total: 21
- Wins: 16
- By knockout: 13
- Losses: 4
- By knockout: 2
- No contests: 1

Kaito Hasegawa (長谷川海翔, Hasegawa Kaito; born July 2, 2005) is a Japanese kickboxer.

As of April 2024 he was the #10 ranked -53 kg kickboxer in the world by Beyond Kickboxing.

== Career ==
=== Early career ===
Hasegawa made his professional debut on April 11, 2021, at DEEP KICK 52 against Ryuzo Hashihiro. He won the fight by technical knockout in the third round.

Hasegawa reached the final of the KROSSxOVER New Generation Cup on December 5, 2021, where he faced Shinichi Watanabe. He won the fight and the title by first-round technical knockout.

Hasegawa made his return to DEEP KICK on January 30, 2021, at DEEP KICK ZERO 1 against Kaede Honami. He won the fight by technical knockout in the first round.

On June 12, 2022, Hasegawa faced KAZUNORI for the vacant DEEP KICK 53 kg title at DEEP KICK 61. He won the fight by doctor stoppage in the third round.

=== RISE ===
Hasegawa made his RISE promotional debut on October 30, 2022, at RISE 162 where he would face Azusa Kaneko. The fight was declared a no contest after a clash of heads opened a cut on Azusa Kaneko that forced the ringside doctor to stop the bout in the first round. Hasegawa had scored a knockdown prior to the stoppage.

Hasegawa successfully defended his DEEP KICK -53 kg title on June 18, 2023, at DEEP KICK 66 against Yuto Uemura who he defeated by knockout in the second round with punches.

On July 30, 2023, Hasegawa faced Tsubasa at RISE 170. He won the fight by knockout with a left cross only 58 seconds into the bout.

Hasegawa faced Naoya Kuroda on February 23, 2023, at RISE 165 -RISE 20th Memorial event-. He won the fight by first-round knockout with a knee.

Hasegawa took part in the RISE New Warriors Tournament, held at RISE 173 on November 18, 2023. He faced Shin Nihon Kickboxing Association champion HIROYUKI in the semifinals. He won the fight by a third-round knockout with a flying knee and advanced to the finals where he would face Jin Mandokoro. Hasegawa was defeated in the final by unanimous decision after suffering a knockdown from a head kick.

On February 23, 2024, Hasegawa faced Sanchai TeppenGym at RISE 176. He won the fight by knockout in the third round with punches.

Hasegawa faced Ryu Hanaoka at RISE 179 on June 30, 2024. He lost the fight by unanimous decision.

Hasegawa faced Yuki Kyotani at RISE 183 on November 23, 2024, in his first fight at -55 kg. Hasegawa won the fight by technical knockout 99 seconds into the bout, as Kyotani was unable to continue due to an injury.

Hasegawa was expected to face Yuga Hoshi at RISE 195 on January 18, 2026. The bout was cancelled the day before the scheduled event after Hoshi was hospitalized due to complications from a weight cut.

== Titles and accomplishments ==
=== Professional ===
- KROSSxOVER
  - 2021 KROSSxOVER New Generation Cup Flyweight Winner
- DEEP KICK
  - 2022 DEEP KICK -53 kg Champion
    - One successful title defense

=== Amateur ===
- 2015 WBC Muay Thai All Japan Jr League (U-12) -31 kg Winner
- 2016 SMASHERS -30 kg Champion
- 2017 NEXT LEVEL Chushikoku -35 kg Champion
- 2017 WBC Muay Thai All Japan Jr League (U-12) -37 kg Winner
- 2018 Peter Aerts Spirit All Japan U-15 -45 kg Champion
- 2019 NEXT LEVEL Chushikoku -50 kg Champion (2 defenses)
- 2019 NEXT LEVEL All Japan Junior -50 kg Champion
- 2020 NEXT LEVEL All Japan Junior -50 kg Champion
- 2021 NEXT LEVEL All Japan Junior -50 kg Champion

== Kickboxing record ==
Professional Kickboxing Record
16 Wins (13 (T)KO's), 4 Losses, 0 Draw, 1 No Contest
Date	Result	Opponent	Event	Location	Method	Round	Time
2026-08-29	Loss	(Japan) Riku Kazushima	RISE 201	Tokyo, Japan	KO (Left cross)	2	2:08
2026-07-26	Win	(Japan) Naojiro Kawano	Okayama Gym Show 11 - Zaimax Muaythai 2026	Hayashima, Japan	KO (Left cross)	1	
2026-03-28	Loss	(Japan) Ryujin Nasukawa	RISE ELDORADO 2026	Tokyo, Japan	TKO (3 Knockdowns)	5	1:17
For the vacant RISE Super Flyweight (-53 kg) title.
2025-11-30	Win	(South Korea) Jung Woo Hyeong	Re:Origin Tottori vol.1	Kurayoshi, Tottori, Japan	KO	1	
2025-08-09	Win	(Japan) Kai Katayama	SHOOT BOXING 2025 act.4	Tokyo, Japan	Decision (Split)	3	3:00
2025-05-31	Win	(Japan) Hiroto Yokoyama	RISE 188	Tokyo, Japan	Decision (Unanimous)	3	3:00
2024-11-23	Win	(Japan) Yuki Kyotani	RISE 183	Tokyo, Japan	TKO (leg injury)	1	
2024-06-30	Loss	(Japan) Ryu Hanaoka	RISE 179	Tokyo, Japan	Decision (Unanimous)	3	3:00
2024-02-23	Win	(Thailand) Sanchai TeppenGym	RISE 176	Tokyo, Japan	KO (Punches)	3	2:31
2023-11-18	Loss	(Japan) Jin Mandokoro	RISE 173 – New Warriors Tournament, Final	Tokyo, Japan	Decision (Unanimous)	3	3:00
RISE Super Flyweight (-53 kg) title eliminator.
2023-11-18	Win	(Japan) HIROYUKI	RISE 173 – New Warriors Tournament, Semifinals	Tokyo, Japan	KO (Flying knee)	3	0:54
2023-07-30	Win	(Japan) Tsubasa	RISE 170	Tokyo, Japan	KO (Left cross)	1	0:58
2023-06-18	Win	(Japan) Yuto Uemura	DEEP KICK 66	Osaka, Japan	KO (Punches)	2	1:18
Defends the DEEP KICK -53kg title.
2023-02-23	Win	(Japan) Naoya Kuroda	RISE 165 -RISE 20th Memorial event-	Tokyo, Japan	TKO (Knee)	2	2:23
2022-10-30	NC	(Japan) Azusa Kaneko	RISE 162	Tokyo, Japan	Doctor stop (head clash)	1	
2022-06-12	Win	(Japan) KAZUNORI	DEEP KICK 61, Championship Tournament Final	Osaka, Japan	TKO (Doctor stoppage)	3	1:34
Wins the vacant DEEP KICK -53kg title.
2022-03-13	Win	(Japan) King Takeshi	DEEP KICK 59, Championship Tournament Semi Final	Izumiōtsu, Japan	TKO (Referee stoppage)	1	2:44
2022-01-30	Win	(Japan) Kaede Honami	DEEP KICK ZERO 1	Osaka, Japan	TKO (punches)	1	2:39
2021-12-05	Win	(Japan) Shinichi Watanabe	KROSS×OVER 15 - New Generation Cup 2021, Final	Tokyo, Japan	TKO (3 knockdowns/punches)	1	0:58
Wins 2021 KROSSxOVER New Generation Cup Flyweight title.
2021-10-03	Win	(Japan) Toranosuke Matsuda	KROSS×OVER 14 - New Generation Cup 2021, Semi Final	Tokyo, Japan	TKO (Doctor stoppage)	2	0:01
2021-07-11	Win	(Japan) Yuji Hosokawa	RKS GOLD RUSH VIII	Osaka, Japan	Decision (unanimous)	3	3:00
2021-04-11	Win	(Japan) Ryuzo Hashihiro	DEEP☆KICK 52	Osaka, Japan	TKO	3	2:57
Legend: Win Loss Draw/No contest Notes

=== Amateur record ===
Amateur Kickboxing Record
Date	Result	Opponent	Event	Location	Method	Round	Time
2021-02-21	Win	(Japan) Tensuke Yamazaki	NJKF 2021 west 1st - NEXT LEVEL All Japan Unification 7	Osaka, Japan	Decision (Unanimous)	3	1:30
Wins NEXT LEVEL All Japan Junor -50kg title.
2020-12-06	Win	(Japan) Takayuki Yamada	NJKF 2020 west Young Fight	Okayama, Japan	TKO	1	1:19
Defends NEXT LEVEL Chushikoku -50kg title.
2020-09-21	Win	(Japan) Naruto Matsumoto	DEEP☆KICK 46･47 - NEXT LEVEL All Japan Unification 6	Izumiōtsu, Japan	Decision (Split)	3	1:30
Wins NEXT LEVEL All Japan Junior -50kg title.
2020-02-23	Draw	(Japan) Riku Otsu	KROSS×OVER 8	Saitama, Japan	Decision	2	2:00
2020-02-16	Win	(Japan) Yusei Nakamoto	NEXT LEVEL Chushikoku 36	Kurashiki, Japan	Decision (Unanimous)	3	1:30
Defends NEXT LEVEL Chushikoku -50kg title.
2019-12-15	Win	(Japan) Naruto Matsumoto	NEXT LEVEL Chushikoku 35 - NEXT LEVEL All Japan Unification 5	Kurashiki, Japan	TKO	2	
Wins NEXT LEVEL All Japan Junior -50kg title.
2019-10-06	Win	(Japan) Hayato Yokota	ALL BOX World 14th	Akashi, Hyōgo, Japan	Decision (Unanimous)	2	2:00
2019-05-26	Win	(Japan) Kaisei Sasayama	NEXT LEVEL Chushikoku 33	Kurashiki, Japan	Decision (Unanimous)	3	1:30
Wins NEXT LEVEL Chushikoku -50kg title.
2019-04-07	Loss	(Japan) Rui Yamaguchi	DEEP☆KICK 39 - NEXT LEVEL All Japan Unification 4	Izumiōtsu, Japan	Decision (Unanimous)	3	1:30
For the NEXT LEVEL All Japan Junior -50kg title.
2019-02-03	Win	(Japan) Yoma Kanemaru	NEXT LEVEL Chushikoku 32	Kurashiki, Japan	Decision (Unanimous)	2	2:00
2018-12-02	Win	(Japan) Ryuta Suekuni	2018 All Japan Peter Aerts Spirit, Final	Osaka, Japan	Decision (Split)		
Wins 2018 All Japan Peter Aerts Spirit U-15 -45kg title.
2018-12-02	Win	(Japan) Daiya Oshikawa	2018 All Japan Peter Aerts Spirit, Semi Final	Osaka, Japan	Decision (Unanimous)		
2018-11-18	Win	(Japan) Ryunosuke Nakajima	NEXT LEVEL Chushikoku 31	Kurashiki, Japan	Decision (Unanimous)	2	2:00
2018-10-14	Draw	(Japan) Riku Matsumoto	Peter Aerts Spirit Kansai vol.3	Osaka, Japan	Decision		
2018-10-14	Win	(Japan) Yamazaki	Peter Aerts Spirit Kansai vol.3	Osaka, Japan	Decision (Unanimous)		
2018-10-07	Win	(Japan) Sora Otsuki	NEXT LEVEL Chushikoku 30	Kurashiki, Japan	Decision (Unanimous)	2	2:00
2018-08-19	Draw	(Japan) Wataru Hiramatsu	SMASHERS Chugokuchiho 12	Okayama, Japan	Decision (Unanimous)	2	2:00
2018-06-24	Win	(Japan) Ukyo Oeda	NEXT LEVEL Chushikoku 29	Kurashiki, Japan	Decision (Unanimous)	2	2:00
2018-05-20	Win	(Japan) Kaimei Haruna	SMASHERS Chugokuchiho 11	Okayama, Japan	Decision (Unanimous)	2	2:00
2018-03-25	Loss	(Japan) Ryuta Suekuni	NEXT LEVEL Chushikoku 28	Kurashiki, Japan	Decision (Split)	3	1:30
For the NEXT LEVEL Chushikoku -40kg title.
2018-02-18	Win	(Japan) Futa Kishi	SMASHERS Chugokuchiho 10	Okayama, Japan	Decision (Unanimous)	2	2:00
2018-01-28	Win	(Japan) Eito Nishimura	NEXT LEVEL Chushikoku 27	Kurashiki, Japan	Decision (Unanimous)	2	2:00
2017-12-17		(Japan) Takuma Urata	SMASHERS 191 - Jr Champions Carnival 2017	Tokyo, Japan			
For the SMASHERS -40kg title.
2017-10-15	Loss	(Japan) Ryosei Hori	SMASHERS Chugokuchiho	Chugoku, Japan	Decision (Split)	3	1:30
For the SMASHERS Chugokuchiho -35kg title.
2017-10-01	Win	(Japan) Kotaro Ikeguchi	NEXT LEVEL Chushikoku 26	Kurashiki, Japan	Decision (Unanimous)	3	1:30
Wins NEXT LEVEL Chushikoku -35kg title.
2017-08-07	Win	(Japan) Narumi Hen	3rd All Japan WBC Muay Thai Jr League, Final	Tokyo, Japan	Decision	2	1:30
Wins 2017 All Japan WBC Muay Thai Jr League Elementary School -37kg title.
2017-07-09	Win	(Japan) Toki Harada	NEXT LEVEL Chushikoku 25	Kurashiki, Japan	Decision (Majority)	2	2:00
2017-05-21	Win	(Japan) Kosei Yoshida	NEXT LEVEL Chushikoku 24	Kurashiki, Japan	Decision (Unanimous)	2	2:00
2017-04-09	Loss	(Japan) Ryosei Hori	SMASHERS Chugokuchiho 7	Chugoku, Japan	Decision (Unanimous)	3	1:30
For the SMASHERS Chugokuchiho -35kg title.
2017-03-07	Loss	(Japan) Ryosei Hori	SMASHERS Chugokuchiho 7	Chugoku, Japan	Decision (Split)	2	2:00
2017-02-26	Win	(Japan) Eiji Okada	NEXT LEVEL Chushikoku 23	Kurashiki, Japan	Decision (Unanimous)	2	2:00
2016-11-13	Loss	(Japan) Ryuta Suekuni	NEXT☆LEVEL Chushikoku 22	Kurashiki, Japan	Decision (Unanimous)	3	1:30
For the NEXT LEVEL Chushikoku -35kg title.
2016-10-09	Loss	(Japan) Wataru Hiramtsu	SMASHERS Chugokuchiho	Chugoku, Japan	Decision (Unanimous)	3	1:30
For the SMASHERS Chugokuchiho -35kg title.
2016-02-14	Loss	(Japan) Wataru Hiramatsu	SMASHERS Chugoku 5	Chugoku, Japan	Decision (Unanimous)	3	1:30
For the SMASHERS Chugokuchiho -35kg title.
2015-11-08	Loss	(Japan) Ryuta Suekuni	NEXT☆LEVEL Chushikoku 18	Kurashiki, Japan	Decision (Majority)	2	2:00
2015-08-30	Win	(Japan)	All Japan WBC Muay Thai Jr League, Final	Tokyo, Japan	Decision		
Wins All Japan WBC Muay Thai Jr League Elementary School -31kg title.
2015-08-02	Win	(Japan) Kensuke Watai	NEXT☆LEVEL Chushikoku 17	Japan	Decision (Decision)	2	2:00
Legend: Win Loss Draw/No contest Notes
