= Nanbara =

Nanbara (written: 南原) is a Japanese surname. Notable people with the surname include:

- Kenta Nanbara (南原 健太; born 1998), Japanese karateka and kickboxer
- Kiyotaka Nanbara (南原清隆; born 1965), Japanese television host and comedian
- Kōji Nanbara (南原 宏治; 1927–2001), Japanese actor
