= David Chibana =

Japanese male kickboxer and boxer

- Born: 24 August 1993 (age 33); Ōta, Tokyo, Japan
- Native name: 知花 デビット
- Nationality: Japanese
- Height: 164 cm (5 ft 5 in)
- Weight: 55 kg (121 lb; 8 st 9 lb)
- Style: Kickboxing, Muay Thai
- Stance: Orthodox
- Fighting out of: Isesaki, Japan
- Team: Eiwa Sportsgym
- Years active: 2012-present

Kickboxing record
- Total: 40
- Wins: 22
- By knockout: 10
- Losses: 14
- By knockout: 2
- Draws: 4

David Chibana (Japanese: 知花デビット, born 24 August 1993) is a Japanese muay thai kickboxer, currently competing in the super bantamweight division of RISE.

A professional competitor since 2012, Chibana is the former WBC Muaythai Japan Bantamweight champion, former INNOVATION Bantamweight champion and the former WMC Japan Bantamweight and Featherweight champion.

Between September and December 2021, Combat Press ranked him as a top ten flyweight kickboxer in the world.

== Muay thai career ==
=== M-Fight ===
Chibana was scheduled to fight Ubai at M-1 Sutt Yod Muaythai vol.4 Part 1 on November 11, 2012. He won the fight by unanimous decision, with scores of 30–28, 29–28 and 29–28.

Chibana was scheduled to face Masaki Takeuchi at TNK1 feat.REBELS on June 9, 2013. He lost the fight by unanimous decision, with all three judges scoring the fight as 30–29 for Takeuchi.

Chibana was scheduled to face Yuta Watanabe at M-FIGHT The Battle of Muaythai V on July 6, 2014. He lost the fight by split decision, with one judge awarding him a 49–48 scorecard, while the other two judges scored the fight 49–48 in Watanabe's favor.

Chibana was scheduled to face Satoshi Katashima at M-FIGHT Suk WEERASAKRECK VII on September 21, 2014. Katashima won the fight by unanimous decision, with scores of 30–29, 30–28 and 29–28.

Chibana was scheduled to face Tatsuya Osawa at WPMF JAPAN The Battle of Muaythai VI on December 7, 2014. The fight was ruled a draw.

Chibana was scheduled to face KOUMA at M-ONE on March 21, 2016. He lost the fight by a third-round technical knockout.

=== Battle of Muaythai ===
Chibana was scheduled to fight a rematch with Kunihiro at The Battle Of Muaythai 13 on December 4, 2016. The previously fought to a draw, under kickboxing rules, in the finals of the 2016 AJKF Super Bantamweight tournament. He won the fight by a fourth-round technical knockout.

Chibana was scheduled to face Kim Kiheung for the WMC Japan Super Bantamweight title at The Battle Of Muaythai 14 on April 9, 2017. He won the fight by a fifth-round knockout.

Chibana was scheduled to make the first defense of his WMC Japan Super Bantamweight title against Takashi Ohno at The Battle Of Muaythai 16 on December 17, 2017. He won the fight by unanimous decision, with scores of 50–48, 50–46 and 50–47.

Chibana was scheduled to face TERU for the WMC Japan Featherweight at Muay Lok 2018 1st on March 18, 2018. He won the fight by unanimous decision, with scores of 50–48, 49–48 and 50–47.

Chibana was scheduled to face Kanta Suzuki at The Battle Of Muay Thai Season 2 vol.4 on July 21, 2019. He won the fight by a second-round knockout.

Chibana was scheduled to face Yugo Kato for the WMC Japan Super Bantamweight title at BOM WAVE 01 on June 28, 2020. He lost the fight by unanimous decision, with scores of 50–48, 50–48 and 49–48.

Chibana faced Kenshi Ueno at BOM 41 on July 9, 2023. He won the fight by a third-round knockout.

== Kickboxing career ==
=== MAJKF Bantamweight Rookie tournament ===
Chibana made his debut against NAOTO at MAJKF FIGHTERS GATE-11 ~ Open the door of your dreams ~ on April 29, 2012, in a quarterfinal bout of the MAJKF Rookie tournament. He won the fight by a second-round knockout. Chibana faced SHOTA in the tournament semifinals, held at MAJKF BREAK-29 ～SHARPLY～ on September 23, 2012. He won the fight by unanimous decision. Chibana faced Yu ☆ Tone in the MAJKF Rookie tournament final, held at MAJKF BREAK-32 -SEIZE- on December 9, 2012. He won the fight by unanimous decision, with scores of 30–28, 29–28 and 30–28.

=== Innovation ===
==== Innovation Bantamweight tournament ====
Chibana's next kickboxing appearance was in the quarterfinals of the Innovation Bantamweight tournament, held at JAPAN KICKBOXING INNOVATION Creative Distraction Detonation on July 7, 2013. He won the fight by unanimous decision, with all three judges awarding him a 30–28 scorecard. Chibana advanced to the tournament semifinal, held at JAPAN KICKBOXING INNOVATION Creative Distraction ~ Flame ~ on September 15, 2013. He won the fight by unanimous decision, with scores of 30–29, 29–28 and 29–28. Chibana faced Takuma Ito in the tournament final at JAPAN KICKBOXING INNOVATION Dream Force-I on April 29, 2014. Ito won the fight by unanimous decision, with scores of 49–48, 49–47 and 48–48.

==== Innovation Bantamweight champion ====
Chibana was scheduled to face the 42-year old veteran EIJI for the Innovation Bantamweight championship at JAPAN KICKBOXING INNOVATION: Dream Force－7 on April 26, 2015. Chibana won the fight by unanimous decision, with all three judges awarding him a 50–43 scorecard. Chibana knocked EIJI down in the second, third and fifth rounds, with all three coming as a result of a head kick.

Chibana was scheduled to make his first title defense against the DEEP KICK super bantamweight champion Masahiko Suzuki at JAPAN KICKBOXING INNOVATION: Join Forces-1 on June 5, 2016. Suzuki won the fight by a third-round technical knockout. Chibana was knocked down with a left hook, with the referee stopping the fight as Chibana wasn't able to defend himself from the following punches.

=== AJKF ===
==== AJKF Super Bantamweight tournament ====
Chibana was scheduled to participate in the 2016 AJFK Super Bantamweight tournament, held at KICKBOXING ZONE 5 on September 11, 2016. He took on Dynamite Kakizaki in the semifinals, and won by unanimous decision. Chibana advanced to the tournament finals, where he faced Kunihiro. The fight was ruled a draw, even after an extension round was fought. As no winner was declared, the title was kept by the organization.

==== Later AJKF appearances ====
Chibana was scheduled to make his RISE debut against Yugo Flyskygym at RISE 117 on May 20, 2017. He lost the fight by unanimous decision, with scores of 28–27, 28–27 and 28–26. Although he scored a knockdown against Yugo in the third round, Chibana was deducted a point each in the second and third round.

Chibana was scheduled to face HIROYUKI at AJKF MAGNUM 45 on October 22, 2017. He won the fight by a fourth-round knockout.

Chibana was scheduled to face Taku Okubo at MAJKF ～FIGHT FOR PEACE 9～ on May 20, 2018. The fight was ruled a draw.

Chibana was scheduled to face Hiroya Haga for the NJKF 55 kg title at NJKF 2018 3rd on September 22, 2018. He lost the fight by unanimous decision, with scores of 49–47, 50–47 and 50–47.

Chibana was scheduled to fight a rematch with Taku Okubo at MAJKF: Soeno Dojo 50th Anniversary Tournament on April 21, 2019, for the WMAF World Super Bantamweight. He won the fight by a first-round knockout.

Chibana was scheduled to face Ryota Mawatari at NJKF 2019 3rd on September 23, 2019. He lost the fight by unanimous decision.

Chibana was scheduled to face Kenichi Takeuchi at Bigbang 37: The Road to Unification on December 29, 2019. The fight was ruled a majority draw.

=== RISE ===
Chibana was scheduled to make his return to RISE against a fellow veteran Yuki Kyotani at RISE 141 on August 23, 2020. He lost the fight by unanimous decision, with scores of 29–28, 29–28 and 30–28.

Chibana was scheduled to face the former DEEP KICK super bantamweight champion Ryota Naito at RISE 144 on December 18, 2020. He won the fight by a third-round knockout, stopping Naito at the very last second of the bout.

Chibana was scheduled to face Rasta Kido at RISE 151 on July 28, 2021. The fight was ruled a draw after the first three rounds and accordingly went into an extension round. Chibana was awarded the split decision, after the extra round was fought.

Chibana was scheduled to fight the #2 ranked RISE bantamweight Kengo at RISE World Series 2021 Osaka 2. Chibana lost the fight by majority decision, with scores of 30-29, 29-29 and 30-28.

Chibana was booked to face the fifth ranked RISE super flyweight Kyosuke at RISE 159 on June 24, 2022. He won the fight by a third-round knockout.

== Championships and accomplishments ==
- MA Japan Kickboxing Federation
  - 2012 MAJKF Bantamweight Rookie Tournament winner
  - 2019 WMAF World Super Bantamweight Championship
- INNOVATION
  - 2015 INNOVATION Bantamweight Championship
- World Boxing Council Muaythai
  - 2015 WBC Muaythai Japan Bantamweight Championship
- World Muaythai Council
  - 2017 WMC Japan Bantamweight Championship
  - 2018 WMC Japan Featherweight Championship

== Fight record ==
Kickboxing & Muay Thai record
22 wins (10 (T)KOs), 14 losses, 4 draws, 0 no contests
Date	Result	Opponent	Event	Location	Method	Round	Time
2023-07-09	Win	(Japan) Kenshi Ueno	BOM 41	Tokyo, Japan	KO (left hook)	3	1:39
2022-06-24	Win	(Japan) Kyosuke	RISE 159	Tokyo, Japan	KO (punches)	3	1:54
2021-11-14	Loss	(Japan) Kengo	Rise World Series Osaka 2	Osaka, Japan	Decision (majority)	3	3:00
2021-07-28	Win	(Japan) Rasta Kido	Rise 151	Tokyo, Japan	Ext. R. decision (split)	4	3:00
2020-12-18	Win	(Japan) Ryota Naito	Rise 144	Tokyo, Japan	KO (left hook)	3	2:59
2020-08-23	Loss	(Japan) Yuki Kyotani	Rise 141	Tokyo, Japan	Decision (unanimous)	3	3:00
2020-06-28	Loss	(Japan) Yugo Kato	BOM WAVE 01	Yokohama, Japan	Decision (unanimous)	5	3:00
For the WMC Japan Super Bantamweight Championship.
2019-12-29	Draw	(Japan) Kenichi Takeuchi	Bigbang 37: The Road to Unification	Tokyo, Japan	Decision (majority)	3	3:00
2019-09-23	Loss	(Japan) Ryota Mawatari	NJKF 2019 3rd	Tokyo, Japan	Decision (unanimous)	3	3:00
2019-07-21	Win	(Japan) Kanta Suzuki	The Battle Of Muay Thai Season 2 vol.4	Tokyo, Japan	KO (right hook)	2	3:00
2019-04-21	Win	(Japan) Taku Okubo	MAJKF: Soeno Dojo 50th Anniversary Tournament	Tokyo, Japan	KO (left hook)	1	2:17
Wins the WMAF World Super Bantamweight title.
2018-09-22	Loss	(Japan) Hiroya Haga	NJKF 2018 3rd	Tokyo, Japan	Decision (unanimous)	5	3:00
For the NJKF 55 kg title.
2018-05-20	Draw	(Japan) Taku Okubo	MAJKF ～FIGHT FOR PEACE 9～	Tokyo, Japan	Decision (unanimous)	3	3:00
2018-03-18	Win	(Japan) TERU	Muay Lok 2018 1st	Tokyo, Japan	Decision (unanimous)	5	3:00
Wins the WMC Japan Featherweight Championship.
2017-12-17	Loss	(Japan) Takashi Ohno	The Battle Of Muaythai 16	Kanagawa, Japan	Decision (unanimous)	5	3:00
Loses the WMC Japan Super Bantamweight Championship.
2017-10-22	Win	(Japan) HIROYUKI	AJKF MAGNUM 45	Tokyo, Japan	KO (Knees)	4	3:00
2017-05-20	Loss	(Japan) Yugo Flyskygym	RISE 117	Tokyo, Japan	Decision (unanimous)	3	3:00
2017-04-09	Win	(South Korea) Kim Kiheung	The Battle Of Muaythai 14	Tokyo, Japan	KO (right hook)	5	3:00
Wins the WMC Japan Super Bantamweight Championship.
2017-02-05	Win	(Japan) Ryo Takahashi	NKB Kamikaze Series VOL.1	Tokyo, Japan	Decision (unanimous)	5	3:00
2016-12-04	Win	(Japan) Kunihiro	The Battle Of Muaythai 13	Kanagawa, Japan	TKO (doctor stoppage)	4	0:58
2016-09-11	Draw	(Japan) Kunihiro	KICKBOXING ZONE 5 Okinawa, Tournament Final	Okinawa, Japan	Decision (split)	4	3:00
For the AJKF Super Bantamweight. Title was kept by the organizer.
2016-09-11	Win	(Japan) Dynamite Kakizaki	KICKBOXING ZONE 5 Okinawa, Tournament Semifinal	Okinawa, Japan	Decision (unanimous)	3	3:00
2016-06-05	Loss	(Japan) Masahiko Suzuki	JAPAN KICKBOXING INNOVATION: Join Forces-1	Tokyo, Japan	TKO (referee stoppage)	3	2:20
Loses the INNOVATION Bantamweight Championship.
2016-03-21	Loss	(Japan) KOUMA	M-ONE	Tokyo, Japan	TKO (doctor stoppage)	3	1:16
2015-09-27	Win	(Japan) Hiroki Maeda	NJKF 2015 6th	Tokyo, Japan	Decision (unanimous)	5	3:00
Wins the WBC Muaythai Japan Bantamweight Championship.
2015-04-26	Win	(Japan) EIJI	JAPAN KICKBOXING INNOVATION: Dream Force－7	Tokyo, Japan	Decision (unanimous)	5	3:00
Wins the INNOVATION Bantamweight Championship.
2015-03-13	Win	(Japan) Buriburizaemon	TENKAICHI FIGHT	Fujioka, Gunma, Japan	Decision (unanimous)	3	3:00
2014-12-07	Draw	(Japan) Tatsuya Osawa	WPMF JAPAN The Battle of Muaythai VI	Kanagawa, Japan	Decision (unanimous)	3	3:00
2014-09-21	Loss	(Japan) Satoshi Katashima	M-FIGHT Suk WEERASAKRECK VII	Tokyo, Japan	Decision (unanimous)	3	3:00
2014-07-06	Loss	(Japan) Yuta Watanabe	M-FIGHT The Battle of Muaythai V	Tokyo, Japan	Decision (split)	5	3:00
2014-04-29	Loss	(Japan) Takuma Ito	JAPAN KICKBOXING INNOVATION Dream Force-I, Tournament Final	Tokyo, Japan	Decision (unanimous)	5	3:00
For the INNOVATION Bantamweight Championship.
2013-09-15	Win	(Japan) RAIDEN	JAPAN KICKBOXING INNOVATION Creative Distraction ~ Flame ~, Tournament Semifinal	Tokyo, Japan	Decision (unanimous)	3	3:00
2013-07-07	Win	(Japan) Yoshiyuki Dobashi	JAPAN KICKBOXING INNOVATION Creative Distraction Detonation, Tournament Quarterfinal	Tokyo, Japan	Decision (unanimous)	3	3:00
2013-06-09	Loss	(Japan) Masaki Takeuchi	TNK1 feat.REBELS	Takasaki, Japan	Decision (unanimous)	3	3:00
2013-02-24	Loss	(Japan) Tatsuya Rose	TENKAICHI Fight	Takasaki, Japan	Ext. R. decision (split)	4	3:00
For the TENKAICHI Bantamweight Championship.
2012-12-09	Win	(Japan) Yu ☆ Tone	MAJKF BREAK-32 -SEIZE-, Tournament Final	Tokyo, Japan	Decision (unanimous)	3	3:00
Wins the MAJKF Bantamweight Championship.
2012-11-11	Win	(Japan) Ubai	M-1 Sutt Yod Muaythai vol.4 Part 1	Tokyo, Japan	Decision (unanimous)	3	3:00
2012-09-23	Win	(Japan) SHOTA	MAJKF BREAK-29 ～SHARPLY～, Tournament Semifinal	Tokyo, Japan	Decision (unanimous)	3	3:00
2012-06-24	Win	(Japan) Kazuki	TENKAICHI FIGHT	Tokyo, Japan	KO	3	
2012-04-29	Win	(Japan) NAOTO	MAJKF FIGHTERS GATE-11 ~ Open the door of your dreams ~, Tournament Quarterfinal	Tokyo, Japan	KO	2	1:09
Legend: Win Loss Draw/no contest Notes

== See also ==
- List of male kickboxers
