= Tsubasa Kaneko =

Japanese kickboxer (born 1996)

Tsubasa
- Born: 金子翼; April 3, 1996 (age 30); Fujimi, Saitama, Japan
- Native name: Tsubasa Kaneko
- Other names: Airstrike Porcupine
- Height: 1.67 m (5 ft 5 1/2 in)
- Weight: 53 kg (117 lb; 8.3 st)
- Style: Kickboxing
- Stance: Southpaw
- Fighting out of: Toshima, Tokyo, Japan
- Team: Victory Gym (2016-2021); TARGET (2022-present)
- Years active: 2016 - present

Kickboxing record
- Total: 22
- Wins: 15
- By knockout: 8
- Losses: 6
- By knockout: 4
- Draws: 1

Tsubasa Kaneko (Japanese: 金子翼, Kaneko Tsubasa; born April 3, 1996) is a Japanese kickboxer, better known by his ring name Tsubasa. He currently competes in the super flyweight division of RISE. Between November 2022 and January 2023, he was ranked as the fourth best flyweight kickboxer in the world by Beyond Kick.

== Professional kickboxing career ==
=== SNKA & JKA ===
Tsubasa made his professional debut against Yuma Sano at JKA "KICK Insist 6" on November 6, 2016. He won the fight by unanimous decision. Next year, at SNKA "WINNERS 2017 2nd" on May 14, Tsubasa would fight to a career first decision draw against Kyohei Furumura.

Tsubasa faced Tetsu Ittokan at KICK Insist 8 on November 11, 2018. He won the fight by a second-round technical knockout. Tsubasa won all four of his fights in 2019 as well, as he knocked out Kazuya Kato on January 6, and Ryohei Tanaka on May 12, and was able to overcome both Ryuji Ebihara on August 4, and Ryohei Tanaka in a vacant JKA Bantamweight title bout on November 9, by unanimous decision.

Tsubasa was expected to face Ikko Ota at KICK Insist 10 on March 15, 2020, in a "JKA vs. NJKF" themed bout. The entire event was later postponed until November 22, due to measures implemented to combat the COVID-19 pandemic. Tsubasa lost the fight by unanimous decision.

Tsubasa faced the WMC Japan Super Bantamweight champion Yugo Kato in a non-title bout at NO KICK NO LIFE on July 22, 2021. He lost the fight by unanimous decision.

=== RISE ===
Tsubasa made his RISE promotional debut against the WMC Intercontinental bantamweight champion Atsumu at RISE 155 on February 23, 2022. He won the fight by a second-round technical knockout. Tsubasa next faced Kyosuke at RISE 156 on March 27, 2022. Kyosuke won the fight by a second-round technical knockout, handing Tsubasa the first stoppage loss of his professional career.

Tsubasa faced the #2 ranked RISE super flyweight contender Ryu Hanaoka at RISE World Series 2022 on October 15, 2022. He won the fight by an upset technical decision. The bout was stopped four seconds before the end of the second round, due to an accidental clash of heads which left a cut above Tsubasa's right eye.

Tsubasa faced Shuto Sato at RISE WORLD SERIES / SHOOTBOXING-KINGS, an event co-promoted by RISE with Glory and Shootboxing, on December 25, 2022. He lost the fight by a first-round technical knockout.

Tsubasa faced Kaito Hasegawa at RISE 170 on July 30, 2023. He lost the fight by a first-round knockout.

Tsubasa faced Shuto Sato at SHOOT BOXING 2023 Series Final on November 14, 2023. He lost the fight by a second-round technical knockout.

== Championships and accomplishments ==
- Japan Kickboxing Association
  - 2019 JKA Bantamweight Championship

== Kickboxing record ==
Professional Kickboxing record
15 Wins (8 (T)KO's), 7 Losses, 1 Draw
Date	Result	Opponent	Event	Location	Method	Round	Time
2026-08-07	Win	(China) Peng Zihao	ONE: The Inner Circle 25	Bangkok, Thailand	KO (High kick)	1	
2025-11-09	Loss	(Japan) Ryoya Ito	RISE 193	Tokyo, Japan	Decision (Unanimous)	3	3:00
2025-04-19	Win	(Japan) Yuki Kyotani	RISE 187	Tokyo, Japan	KO (Left cross)	3	
2024-12-15	Win	(Japan) Kyosuke	RISE 184	Tokyo, Japan	Decision (Majority)	3	3:00
2024-02-10	Win	(Japan) Daiki Kobayashi	SHOOT BOXING 2024 act.1	Tokyo, Japan	Decision (Unanimous)	3	3:00
2023-11-14	Loss	(Japan) Shuto Sato	SHOOT BOXING 2023 Series Final	Tokyo, Japan	TKO (Punches)	2	
2023-07-30	Loss	(Japan) Kaito Hasegawa	RISE 170	Tokyo, Japan	KO (left straight)	1	1:58
2022-12-25	Loss	(Japan) Shuto Sato	RISE WORLD SERIES / SHOOTBOXING-KINGS 2022	Tokyo, Japan	TKO (3 knockdowns)	1	
2022-10-15	Win	(Japan) Ryu Hanaoka	RISE WORLD SERIES 2022	Tokyo, Japan	Tech. Decision (Unanimous)	2	2:56
2022-07-29	Win	(Japan) Soma Tameda	RISE 160	Tokyo, Japan	TKO (Punches)	1	0:31
2022-03-27	Loss	(Japan) Kyosuke	RISE 156	Tokyo, Japan	TKO (Punches)	2	0:30
2022-02-23	Win	(Japan) Atsumu	RISE 155	Tokyo, Japan	TKO (Punches)	2	1:11
2021-07-22	Loss	(Japan) Yugo Kato	NO KICK NO LIFE	Tokyo, Japan	Decision (Unanimous)	3	3:00
2020-11-22	Loss	(Japan) Ikko Ota	JKA "Kick Insist 10"	Tokyo, Japan	Decision (Unanimous)	3	3:00
2019-11-09	Win	(Japan) Ryohei Tanaka	JKA "Kick Insist 9"	Tokyo, Japan	Decision (Unanimous)	5	3:00
Wins the vacant JKA Bantamweight title.
2019-08-04	Win	(Japan) Ryuji Ebihara	JKA "KICK ORIGIN"	Tokyo, Japan	Decision (Unanimous)	3	3:00
2019-05-12	Win	(Japan) Ryohei Tanaka	JKA "KICK ORIGIN"	Tokyo, Japan	KO (Left straight)	2	1:07
2019-01-06	Win	(Japan) Kazuya Kato	SNKA "WINNERS 2019 1st"	Tokyo, Japan	TKO	1	2:52
2018-11-11	Win	(Japan) Tetsu Ittokan	JKA "KICK Insist 8"	Tokyo, Japan	KO (Body shot)	2	0:20
2018-08-04	Win	(Japan) Hideyoshi Yamano	SNKA "WINNERS 2018 3rd"	Tokyo, Japan	TKO	1	1:15
2017-05-14	Draw	(Japan) Kyohei Furumura	SNKA "WINNERS 2017 2nd"	Tokyo, Japan	Decision	2	3:00
2016-11-06	Win	(Japan) Yuma Sano	JKA "KICK Insist 6"	Tokyo, Japan	Decision (Unanimous)	2	3:00
Legend: Win Loss Draw/No contest Notes

Amateur Kickboxing & Muay Thai record
Date	Result	Opponent	Event	Location	Method	Round	Time
2016-03-13	Win	(Japan) Koki Osaki	MuayThai Super Fight Suk Wan Kingthong vol.4	Tokyo, Japan	Decision	2	2:00
2015-12-20	Loss	(Japan) Tatsuya Takagi	MuayThai Super Fight Suk Wan Kingthong vol.3	Tokyo, Japan	Decision	2	2:00
2015-08-02	Win	(Japan) Shota Tawaraya	MuayThai Super Fight Suk Wan Kingthong	Tokyo, Japan	Decision	2	2:00
2015-06-21	Win	(Japan) Yugo Kato		Tokyo, Japan	Decision	2	2:00
2015-04-26	Win	(Japan) Masami Watanabe	MuayThai Super Fight Suk Wan Kingthong	Tokyo, Japan	KO	1	
2014-11-16	Win	(Japan) Ryuichi Sunagawa		Tokyo, Japan	KO	1	
Legend: Win Loss Draw/No contest Notes

== See also ==
- List of male kickboxers
