= Yugo Kato =

Japanese male kickboxer and boxer

- Born: 2 September 1999 (age 27); Meguro, Meguro-ku, Japan
- Native name: 加藤有吾
- Height: 169 cm (5 ft 7 in)
- Weight: 55 kg (121 lb; 8 st 9 lb)
- Style: Kickboxing
- Stance: Orthodox
- Fighting out of: Ōta, Tokyo
- Team: RIKIX
- Years active: 2016-present

Kickboxing record
- Total: 40
- Wins: 30
- By knockout: 14
- Losses: 10
- By knockout: 3

Yugo Kato (加藤有吾, born 2 September 1999) is a Japanese kickboxer and muay thai fighter, currently competing in the super bantamweight divisions of RISE.

As of September 2021, he is the #10 ranked flyweight kickboxer in the world, according to Combat Press.

== Muay Thai career ==
=== Early career ===
Kato made his muay thai and professional debut against Masa Bravely at M-ONE 2016 3rd on 25 September 2016. He won the fight by unanimous decision.

Kato was scheduled to face Ryuto Matsumoto at BOM13-The Battle Of Muay Thai 13- on 4 December 2016. He won the fight by unanimous decision.

Kato was scheduled to face Hiiragito at M-ONE 2017 1st on 20 March 2017. He lost the fight by split decision, with two judges awarding Hiiragito a 30-29 and 29-28 scorecard, while the third judge scored it 29-28 for Kato.

Kato was scheduled to face Shuto Sato at Road To KNOCK OUT.1 on 10 May 2017. He won the fight by a first-round technical knockout.

Kato was scheduled to face Maiki Flyskygym at The Battle Of Muay Thai 19 on 14 October 2018. He won the fight by unanimous decision, with scores of 29–28, 29-28 and 30–27.

Kato was scheduled to face Masaki Takeuchi at ROAD TO KNOCK OUT Vol. 3 on 16 January 2019. Takeuchi won the fight by a second-round technical knockout, after the ringside doctor stopped the fight due to a cut on Kato's eyelid. Kato was the more successful fighter in the first round, having knocked Takeuchi down with a left hook.

Kato was scheduled to face Akihiko at The Battle Of Muay Thai Season 2 vol.2 on 1 June 2019. He won the fight by a second-round technical knockout.

Kato was scheduled to face Suda456 at Pancrase & TRIBE TOKYO M.M.A Road to ONE Century, a Pancrase and ONE Championship cross-promotional event, on 1 September 2019. He won the fight by a second-round knockout.

=== WMC Japan Super Bantamweight champion ===
Kato was scheduled to challenge the reigning WMC Japan Super Bantamweight champion Maiki Flyskygym at The Battle Of Muay Thai Season II vol.6 Part 1 on 7 December 2019. The fight was a rematch of their 14 October 2018 meeting, which Kato won by unanimous decision. He was once again victorious, as he won by majority decision.

Kato was scheduled to face Yutto at The Battle Of Muay Thai Season 2 vol.7 Part 2 on 9 February 2020. He won the fight by a second-round knockout.

Kato made the first defense of his WMC Japan title against the WMC Featherweight champion David Chibana at BOM WAVE 01 on 28 June 2020. He won the fight by unanimous decision, with scores of 50–48, 50–48 and 49–48.

Kato was scheduled to face MASAKING at NO KICK NO LIFE ~New Chapter~ on 29 October 2020. He won the fight by a first-round knockout, stopping MASAKING with a left hook at the 1:28 minute mark.

Kato was scheduled to make the second defense of his WMC Japan title against Dynamite Kakizaki at The Battle Of MuayThai -ouroboros 2021- on 26 September 2021. He won the fight by a second-round knockout.

== Kickboxing career ==
=== Early career ===
Kato was scheduled to face Kaewpayak Y'ZD Gym at NKB Fighting Spirit Series Vol.3 on 16 June 2018. He won the fight by a second-round knockout.

Kato was scheduled to face Ryohei Tanaka at KICK ORIGIN on 4 August 2019. He won the fight by unanimous decision, with scores of 30–28, 30-28 and 30–29.

Kato was scheduled to participate in a Japan Kickboxing Innovation Super Bantamweight tournament, held at Japan Kickboxing Innovation 7th Okayama Gym Certification on 16 January 2021. He won the semifinal match against Yuki Motoyama by a first-round technical knockout. He advanced to the tournament finals, where he faced Issei Saenchai Gym. Kato beat Issei by a wide unanimous decision, with scores of 30–24, 30-24 and 30–25.

Kato was scheduled to face Keisuke Miyamoto at NO KICK NO LIFE New Chapter -Ungai Soten- on 24 February 2021. He lost the fight by majority decision, with scores of 30–29, 29-29 and 29–28.

Kato was scheduled to face Tsubasa at NO KICK NO LIFE on 22 July 2021. He won the fight by unanimous decision.

Kato was scheduled to face Keisuke Miyamoto at a NO KICK NO LIFE held on 9 January 2022. He won the fight by majority decision.

Kato was booked to face Issei SaenchaiGym at Japan Kickboxing Innovation Okayama Gym Show 8 on March 13, 2022. He won the fight by a third-round knockout.

Kato was scheduled to face Koki Osaki at the May 28, 2022, NO KICK NO LIFE event. He lost the fight by technical knockout, as the fight was stopped in the fifth round on the advice of the ringside physician.

=== RISE ===
Kato was booked to face Shoma at RISE World Series Osaka 2022 on August 21, 2022. He won the fight by unanimous decision.

Kato faced Ryunosuke Omori at RISE 163 on December 10, 2022. He won the fight by majority decision, with two scorecards of 30–29 and 29–28 and one scorecard of 29–29.

Kato faced Yuki Kyotani at RISE 166 -RISE 20th Memorial event- on February 23, 2023.

Kato faced Kyosuke at RISE 169 on June 23, 2023. He won the fight by unanimous decision, with scores of 30–28, 30–28 and 29–28.

Kato faced Koki Osaki in a RISE Bantamweight title eliminator at RISE World Series 2023 - 2nd Round on August 26, 2023. He lost the fight by unanimous decision, with scores of 30–29, 29–28 and 29–28.

Kato faced Shoa Arii RISE 174 at on December 10, 2023. He won the fight by majority decision, with scores of 30–29, 29–28 and 29–29.

Kato faced Jaroensuk BoonlannaMuaythai at RISE EL DORADO 2024 on March 17, 2024. He lost the fight by unanimous decision.

Kato faced Nuasila Wor.Auracha at NO KICK NO LIFE on May 17, 2024. He won the fight by a second-round knockout.

Kato faced Musashi Matsushita at RISE WORLD SERIES 2024 YOKOHAMA on September 8, 2024. He won the fight by majority decision, with scores of 30–29, 30–29 and 29–29.

Kato faced Ke Jingjun at ONE Friday Fights 91 on December 13, 2024. He won the fight by a third-round knockout.

Kato faced Reiji at RISE WORLD SERIES 2025 Yokohama on June 21, 2025. He won fight by a second-round knockout.

Kato faced the former RISE Bantamweight champion Masahiko Suzuki at RISE 191 on August 30, 2025. He lost the fight by unanimous decision.

Kato faced Pol Pascual at ONE Friday Fights 139 on January 23, 2026.

== Championships and accomplishments ==
- World Muaythai Council
  - 2019 WMC Japan Super Bantamweight (-55 kg) Championship
- Japan Kickboxing Innovation
  - 2021 Japan Kickboxing Innovation -55 kg Tournament Winner

== Fight record ==
Kickboxing record
30 Wins (14 (T)KO's), 10 Losses, 0 Draw, 0 No Contest
Date	Result	Opponent	Event	Location	Method	Round	Time
2026-11-18	Loss	(Japan) Jurai Ishii	ONE Samurai 5	Tokyo, Japan	Decision (Unanimous)	3	3:00
2026-10-02	Win	(Thailand) Fahlap Toyotarayong	ONE The Inner Circle 33, Lumpinee Stadium	Bangkok, Thailand	KO (left hook to the body)	1	1:12
2026-04-26	Loss	(Japan) Yusei Horimoto	RISE 197	Tokyo, Japan	Decision (Majority)	3	3:00
2025-08-30	Loss	(Japan) Masahiko Suzuki	RISE 191	Tokyo, Japan	Decision (Unanimous)	3	3:00
2025-06-21	Win	(Japan) Reiji	RISE WORLD SERIES 2025 Yokohama	Yokohama, Japan	KO (Left hook)	2	1:27
2024-12-13	Win	(China) Ke Jingjun	ONE Friday Fights 91, Lumpinee Stadium	Bangkok, Thailand	KO (Punches)	2	1:06
2024-09-08	Win	(Japan) Musashi Matsushita	RISE WORLD SERIES 2024 Yokohama	Yokohama, Japan	Decision (Majority)	3	3:00
2024-05-17	Win	(Thailand) Nuasila Wor.Auracha	NO KICK NO LIFE	Tokyo, Japan	KO (Left hook to the body)	2	0:52
2024-03-17	Loss	(Thailand) Jaroensuk BoonlannaMuaythai	RISE ELDORADO 2024	Tokyo, Japan	Decision (Unanimous)	3	3:00
2023-12-10	Win	(Japan) Shoa Arii	RISE 174	Tokyo, Japan	Decision (Majority)	3	3:00
2023-08-26	Loss	(Japan) Koki Osaki	RISE World Series 2023 - 2nd Round	Tokyo, Japan	Decision (Unanimous)	3	3:00
2023-06-23	Win	(Japan) Kyosuke	RISE 169	Tokyo, Japan	Decision (Unanimous)	3	3:00
2023-02-23	Win	(Japan) Yuki Kyotani	RISE 166: RISE 20th Memorial event	Tokyo, Japan	KO (Left straight)	2	2:29
2022-12-10	Win	(Japan) Ryunosuke Omori	RISE 163	Tokyo, Japan	Decision (Majority)	3	3:00
2022-08-21	Win	(Japan) Shoma	RISE WORLD SERIES OSAKA 2022	Osaka, Japan	Decision (Unanimous)	3	3:00
2022-05-28	Loss	(Japan) Koki Osaki	NO KICK NO LIFE	Tokyo, Japan	TKO (Doctor stoppage)	5	2:20
2022-03-13	Win	(Japan) Issei SaenchaiGym	Japan Kickboxing Innovation Okayama Gym Show 8	Okayama, Japan	KO (Jumping knee)	3	2:42
2022-01-09	Win	(Japan) Keisuke Miyamoto	NO KICK NO LIFE	Tokyo, Japan	Decision (Majority)	5	3:00
2021-09-26	Win	(Japan) Dynamite Kakizaki	The Battle Of MuayThai -ouroboros 2021-	Ōta, Tokyo, Japan	KO (Right Hook)	2	1:32
2021-07-22	Win	(Japan) Tsubasa	NO KICK NO LIFE	Kōtō, Japan	Decision (Unanimous)	3	3:00
2021-02-24	Loss	(Japan) Keisuke Miyamoto	NO KICK NO LIFE New Chapter -Ungai Soten-	Shibuya, Japan	Decision (Majority)	3	3:00
2021-01-16	Win	(Japan) Issei Saenchai Gym	Japan Kickboxing Innovation Okayama Gym Show 7, Tournament Final	Okayama, Japan	Decision (Unanimous)	3	3:00
Wins the Innovation 55kg Tournament.
2021-01-16	Win	(Japan) Yuki Motoyama	Japan Kickboxing Innovation Okayama Gym Show 7, Tournament Semifinal	Okayama, Japan	TKO (Three knockdowns)	1	2:11
2020-10-29	Win	(Japan) MASAKING	NO KICK NO LIFE ~New Chapter~	Tokyo, Japan	KO (Left hook)	1	1:28
2020-06-28	Win	(Japan) David Chibana	BOM WAVE 01	Yokohama, Japan	Decision (Unanimous)	5	3:00
Defends the WMC Japan Super Bantamweight title.
2020-02-09	Win	(Japan) Yutto	The Battle Of Muay Thai Season 2 vol.7 Part 2	Shinjuku, Japan	TKO	2	1:54
2019-12-07	Win	(Japan) Maiki Flyskygym	The Battle Of Muay Thai Season II vol.6 Part 1	Tokyo, Japan	Decision (Majority)	5	3:00
Wins the WMC Japan Super Bantamweight title.
2019-09-01	Win	(Japan) Suda456	Pancrase&TRIBE TOKYO M.M.A Road to ONE Century	Tokyo, Japan	KO (Left straight)	2	1:16
2019-08-04	Win	(Japan) Ryohei Tanaka	KICK ORIGIN	Bunkyō, Japan	Decision (Unanimous)	3	3:00
2019-06-01	Win	(Japan) Akihiko	The Battle Of Muay Thai Season 2 vol.2	Yokohama, Japan	TKO (Punches)	2	2:07
2019-01-16	Loss	(Japan) Masaki Takeuchi	ROAD TO KNOCK OUT Vol. 3	Shibuya, Japan	TKO (Doctor stoppage)	2	1:31
2018-10-14	Win	(Japan) Maiki Flyskygym	The Battle Of Muay Thai 19	Shinjuku, Japan	Decision (Unanimous)	3	3:00
2018-06-16	Win	(Thailand) Kaewpayak Y'ZD Gym	NKB Fighting Spirit Series Vol.3	Bunkyō, Japan	KO	2	0:35
2017-06-11	Loss	(Japan) Aido Suenaga	BOUT 27	Sapporo, Japan	KO	1	
2017-05-10	Win	(Japan) Shuto Sato	Road To KNOCK OUT.1	Shibuya, Japan	TKO (Punches)	1	2:17
2017-04-29	Win	(Japan) Jinnojo	Join Forces-5	Shinjuku, Japan	Decision (Unanimous)	3	3:00
2017-03-20	Loss	(Japan) Hiiragito	M-ONE 2017 1st	Ariake, Tokyo, Japan	Decision (Split)	3	3:00
2017-01-22	Win	(Japan) Tatsuya Gitteichai	REBELS.48 & INNOVATION Champions Carnival	Tokyo, Japan	Decision (Unanimous)	3	3:00
2016-12-04	Win	(Japan) Ryuto Matsumoto	BOM13-The Battle Of Muay Thai 13-	Tokyo, Japan	Decision (Unanimous)	3	3:00
2016-09-25	Win	(Japan) Masa Bravely	M-ONE 2016 3rd	Ariake, Tokyo, Japan	Decision (Unanimous)	3	3:00
Legend: Win Loss Draw/No contest Notes

== See also ==
- List of male kickboxers
