= Yuki Kyotani =

Japanese kickboxer

- Born: 京谷祐希; July 20, 1988 (age 38); Osaka, Japan
- Nickname: Legendary smasher
- Height: 170 cm (5 ft 7 in)
- Weight: 55 kg (121 lb; 8.7 st)
- Style: Kickboxing
- Stance: Southpaw
- Fighting out of: Osaka, Japan
- Team: Yamaguchi Dojo (2008-2022); TEAM TEPPEN (2022-present)
- Years active: 2008 - present

Kickboxing record
- Total: 35
- Wins: 20
- By knockout: 11
- Losses: 13
- By knockout: 8
- Draws: 2

Yuki Kyotani (Japanese: 京谷祐希, Kyotani Yuki; born 20 July 1988) is a Japanese kickboxer, currently competing in the bantamweight division of RISE. Between December 2021 and June 2022, Combat Press ranked him as the tenth best flyweight in the world.

== Kickboxing career ==
=== Early career ===
Kyotani was scheduled to face Jom OishiGym at RKS Fist Runaway Typhoon Legend vol.1 on March 6, 2016. He won the fight by a second-round technical knockout.

Kyotani was scheduled to face Yuta “Cat” Hamamoto at REBELS 44 on July 10, 2016. He won the fight by a wide unanimous decision, with scores of 30-24, 30-24 and 30-24.

Kyotani participated in a one-night Hoost Cup West Japan Top Fighter 55 kg tournament. He faced Shuhei Kumura in the semifinals, whom he beat by unanimous decision, with scores of 30-29, 30-29 and 30-28. Kyotani advanced to the tournament finals, where he faced KING Kyosuke. He lost the final match by unanimous decision, with scores of 30-27, 29-28 and 29-28.

=== RISE ===
Kyotani was scheduled to face Azusa Kaneko at RISE WORLD SERIES 2019 Final Round on September 16, 2019. He won the fight by a second-round technical knockout, stopping Kaneko with a flurry of punches at the 2:09 minute mark.

Kyotani faced Shiro Matsumoto at Rise 136 on January 13, 2020. He lost the fight by majority decision, with scores of 30-29, 29-29 and 30-29.

Kyotani was expected to fight Rasta Kido in the reserve match of the 2020 RISE Asia Series tournament, at the April 12, 2020, RISE Word Series event. The entire event was later postponed due to the COVID-19 pandemic.

Kyotani was scheduled to face the former two-weight WMC Japan champion David Chibana at Rise 141 on August 23, 2021. He won the fight by unanimous decision, with scores of 29-28, 29-28 and 30-28.

Kyotani was scheduled to face Yosuke at Rise Dead or Alive 2020 Osaka on November 1, 2020. He won the fight by unanimous decision, with scores of 30-29, 30-28 and 30-29.

Kyotani was expected to fight Kyosuke, who was moving up to RISE's bantamweight division from super flyweight, at Rise 149 on May 23, 2021. On April 24, 2021, it was revealed that Kyosuke had withdrawn from the bout due to a left lunate fracture, and would be replaced by the DEEP KICK bantamweight champion Ryoga Terayama. The fight was ruled a unanimous decision draw after the first three rounds, with scores of 30-30, 29-29 and 30-30. An extension round was fought, after which the fight was once again ruled a draw by unanimous decision, with all three judges scoring it 10-10.

Kyotani was scheduled to face the Shootboxing Japan bantamweight champion Kyo Kawakami at Rise World Series 2021 Osaka on July 18, 2021, in his hometown of Osaka. He lost the fight by unanimous decision, with all three judges awarding Kawakami a 30-29 scorecard.

Kyotani was scheduled to face the reigning Shootboxing Japan super bantamweight champion Seiki Ueyama at Rise World Series 2021 Osaka 2 on November 14, 2021, once again fighting in his hometown. He won the fight by technical decision, with all three judges scoring the fight 30-29 in his favor. The fight was stopped due to a cut above Ueyama's left ear, which was caused by an accidental headbutt.

Kyotani was booked to face Takuya at RISE 155 on February 23, 2022. He won the fight by a second-round technical knockout.

Kyotani was booked to face Ryunosuke Omori at RISE World Series Osaka 2022 on August 21, 2022. He lost the fight by a second-round knockout.

Kyotani faced Yugo Kato at RISE 166 -RISE 20th Memorial event- on February 23, 2023.

Kyotani faced Shoma at RISE World Series 2023 - 1st Round on July 2, 2023. He won the fight by unanimous decision, with scores of 30-29, 30-28 and 30-28.

Kyotani faced Rasta at RISE 177 on April 21, 2024. He won the fight by unanimous decision.

Kyotani faced Ryoya Ito at RISE 185 on January 25, 2025. He lost the fight by unanimous decision, after twice being knocked down in the final round.

Kyotani faced Tsubasa at RISE 187 on April 19, 2025. He lost the fight by a third-round knockout.

== Fight record ==
Kickboxing record
20 Wins (11 (T)KO's), 13 Losses, 2 Draws
Date	Result	Opponent	Event	Location	Method	Round	Time
2025-04-19	Loss	(Japan) Tsubasa	RISE 187	Tokyo, Japan	KO (Left cross)	3	
2025-01-25	Loss	(Japan) Ryoya Ito	RISE 185	Tokyo, Japan	Decision (Unanimous)	3	3:00
2024-11-23	Loss	(Japan) Kaito Hasegawa	RISE 183	Tokyo, Japan	TKO (Leg injury)	1	
2024-04-21	Win	(Japan) Rasta	RISE 177	Tokyo, Japan	Decision (Unanimous)	3	3:00
2023-07-02	Win	(Japan) Shoma	RISE World Series 2023 - 1st Round	Osaka, Japan	Decision (Unanimous)	3	3:00
2023-02-23	Loss	(Japan) Yugo Kato	RISE 166: RISE 20th Memorial event	Tokyo, Japan	KO (Left straight)	2	2:29
2022-08-21	Loss	(Japan) Ryunosuke Omori	RISE WORLD SERIES OSAKA 2022	Osaka, Japan	KO (Knee to the body)	2	1:39
2022-02-23	Win	(Japan) Takuya	RISE 155	Tokyo, Japan	TKO (Corner stoppage)	2	0:49
2021-11-14	Win	(Japan) Seiki Ueyama	Rise World Series 2021 Osaka 2	Osaka, Japan	Tech. Decision (Unanimous)	3	
2021-07-18	Loss	(Japan) Kyo Kawakami	Rise World Series 2021 Osaka	Osaka, Japan	Decision (Unanimous)	3	3:00
2021-05-23	Draw	(Japan) Ryoga Terayama	Rise 149	Tokyo, Japan	Ext. R. Decision (Unanimous)	4	3:00
2020-11-01	Win	(Japan) Yosuke	Rise Dead or Alive 2020 Osaka	Osaka, Japan	Decision (Unanimous)	3	3:00
2020-08-23	Win	(Japan) David Chibana	Rise 141	Tokyo, Japan	Decision (Unanimous)	3	3:00
2020-01-13	Loss	(Japan) Shiro Matsumoto	Rise 136	Tokyo, Japan	Decision (Majority)	3	3:00
2019-09-16	Win	(Japan) Azusa Kaneko	RISE WORLD SERIES 2019 Final Round	Chiba, Japan	TKO (Punches)	2	2:09
2016-10-02	Loss	(Japan) KING Kyosuke	Hoost Cup, Tournament Finals	Tokyo, Japan	Decision (Unanimous)	3	3:00
2016-10-02	Win	(Japan) Shuhei Kumura	Hoost Cup, Tournament Semifinals	Tokyo, Japan	Decision (Unanimous)	3	3:00
2016-07-10	Win	(Japan) Yuta “Cat” Hamamoto	REBELS 44	Tokyo, Japan	Decision (Unanimous)	3	3:00
2016-03-06	Win	(Japan) Jom OishiGym	RKS Fist Runaway Typhoon Legend vol.1	Tokyo, Japan	TKO	2	1:22
2015-02-22	Draw	(Japan) Yuichi	DEEP KICK 24	Tokyo, Japan	Decision (Split)	3	3:00
2013-09-22	Win	(Japan) Yuta Kiuchi	DEEP KICK 17	Tokyo, Japan	TKO (Punches)	2	1:02
2012-06-08	Win	(Japan) Takeru	Krush 19	Tokyo, Japan	TKO (Doctor stop./broken nose)	1	3:00
2012-02-05	Loss	(Japan) Seiya Rokugawa	DEEP KICK 10	Tokyo, Japan	KO (Left hook)	2	1:11
2011-12-25	Win	(Japan) Tatsuya Tsuda	DEEP KICK 9	Tokyo, Japan	KO (Right straight)	3	2:55
2011-10-23	Win	(Japan) Takuya Takahashi	DEEP KICK 8	Tokyo, Japan	TKO (Punches)	3	2_57
2011-04-10	Win	(Japan) Daisuke Murata	DEEP KICK 6	Tokyo, Japan	Decision (Unanimous)	3	3:00
2010-12-12	Loss	(Thailand) Chalermchai Togerhan	DEEP KICK 5	Tokyo, Japan	KO (Right high kick)	2	2:14
2010-08-08	Win	(Japan) Shoyuki	DEEP KICK 4	Tokyo, Japan	KO	1	2:42
2010-04-04	Win	(Japan) Kouzi	DEEP KICK 3	Tokyo, Japan	Decision (Unanimous)	3	3:00
2009-07-26	Loss	(Japan) Daiki Nagashima	J-FIGHT in SHINJYUKU vol.10	Tokyo, Japan	KO (Right straight)	2	1:06
2008-10-03	Loss	(Japan) Hiroyuki Yamano	Let’s Kick with J the 4th	Tokyo, Japan	KO	2	1:50
2008-04-13	Win	(Japan) Kenbo	POWER GATE Kaiser Grand Prix in Kyoto KBS Hall 2nd	Tokyo, Japan	TKO	2	0:51
Legend: Win Loss Draw/No contest Notes
