= Koki Osaki =

Japanese kickboxer

- Born: October 5, 1999 (age 27); Nagoya , Aichi Prefecture, Japan
- Native name: 大﨑 孔稀
- Other names: Koki Oishi Gym (โคกิ โอโออิชิยิมส์)
- Height: 1.65 m (5 ft 5 in)
- Weight: 53 kg (117 lb; 8.3 st)
- Division: Flyweight
- Style: Muay Thai, Kickboxing
- Stance: Orthodox
- Fighting out of: Nagoya , Aichi Prefecture, Japan
- Team: Oishi Gym
- Years active: 2016 - present

Kickboxing record
- Total: 49
- Wins: 40
- By knockout: 22
- Losses: 7
- Draws: 1
- No contests: 1

Other information
- Notable relatives: Kazuki Osaki (brother)

Koki Osaki (Japanese: 大﨑孔稀, Osaki Koki; born October 5, 1999) is a Japanese Muay Thai kickboxer, currently competing in the bantamweight division of RISE, where he is the incumbent RISE Bantamweight champion.

As of March 2023, he is ranked as the fifth best super flyweight (-55 kg) kickboxer in the world by Beyond Kickboxing and sixth best flyweight (-56.7 kg) by Combat Press.

== Martial arts career ==
=== Early career ===
Osaki made his professional debut at J-NETWORK J-KICK 2016～Honor the fighting spirits～2nd with a unanimous decision victory over Idomu Tateshima. He amassed a 10-2-1 record, before fighting Satoshi Katashima for the WMC Japan Super Flyweight title at Muay Lok 2018 Challenge. Osaki won the title with a fourth-round TKO.

In his next fight, at J-KICK 2018～4th～, Osaki fought Masanori Matsuzaki for the J-NETWORK Super Flyweight title. He won the fight by unanimous decision.

On May 26, 2019, Osaki fought Koudai Hirayama for the HOOST CUP -53 kg title. Hirayama won the fight by an extra round majority decision.

=== RISE ===
==== Bantamweight ====
Osaki faced Jin Mandokoro in his RISE debut at RISE 135 on November 4, 2019. He lost the fight by unanimous decision. Osaki faced Kazuya Okuwaki, in his second RISE appearance, at RISE 142 on September 4, 2019. He won the fight by a first-round knockout, flooring Okuwai with a high kick.

Osaki faced the third-ranked RISE bantamweight contender Kyosuke at RISE 145 on January 30, 2021. He won the fight by a second-round knockout. Osaki dropped his opponent with a low kick 30 seconds into the final round of the contest, which left his opponent unable to rise from the canvas.

Osaki faced Kaito Fukuda for the BOM Bantamweight title at BOM WAVE 04 on April 11, 2021. He won the fight by unanimous decision, with two scorecards of 49–48 and one scorecard of 49–47. After capturing his third professional championship, Osaki was booked to face Azusa Kaneko in a reserve fight of the 2021 RISE Dead or Alive Tournament, which took place on July 18, 2021. He won the fight by unanimous decision, with scores of 30–29, 30–29 and 30–28.

Osaki was scheduled to face Koudai Hirayama in a tournament reserve match at RISE WORLD SERIES 2021 Yokohama on September 23, 2021. The two fought previously on May 26, 2019, with Hirayama winning by an extra round majority decision. Osaki was later rescheduled to face Shiro in the tournament semifinals, as a short notice replacement for his brother Kazuki Osaki. He was later removed from the tournament, as he had missed weight by 3.2 kg.

==== Catchweight bouts ====
Osaki was booked to face Tatsuto Ito at 57.5 kg for RISE 156 on March 27, 2022. He won the fight by unanimous decision, with all three judges scoring the bout 30–28 in his favor.

Osaki faced Yugo Kato in a 55.5 kilogram bout at the May 28, 2022, NO KICK NO LIFE event. He won the fight by a fourth-round technical knockout.

Osaki faced Jyosei at RISE 160 on July 29, 2022, in a 56 kg catchweight bout. He won the fight by a first-round technical knockout, after knocking Jyosei down three times by the midway point of the opening round.

==== Return to bantamweight ====
Osaki faced Shiro at RISE World Series 2022 on October 15, 2022. They were initially expected to face each other in the semifinals of the 2021 RISE "Dead or Alive" bantamweight tournament, before the fight was cancelled due to Osaki missing weight. He lost the fight by unanimous decision, after an extra fourth round was fought.

Osaki faced Seiki Ueyama at RISE World Series / SHOOTBOXING-Kings 2022 on December 25, 2022. At the official weigh-ins, Ueyama missed weight by 1.5 kg, which resulted in him being deducted two points before the start of the fight and having to fight in bigger gloves. Osaki won the fight by unanimous decision, with one scorecard of 29–28 and two scorecards of 29–27.

Osaki faced Ryoga Terayama in the main event of RISE 165: RISE 20th Memorial event on February 23, 2023. The fight ended in a majority decision draw. Osaki landed an accidental low blow midway through the final round, which rendered his opponent unable to continue fighting and prompted the referee to call for a technical decision. The pair was booked to fight in an immediate rematch at RISE 168 on May 28, 2023. He won the fight by a second-round technical knockout.

Osaki faced Yugo Kato in a RISE Bantamweight title eliminator at RISE World Series 2023 - 2nd Round on August 26, 2023. He won the fight by unanimous decision, with scores of 30–29, 29–28 and 29–28.

=== RISE Bantamweight champion ===
Osaki challenged Masahiko Suzuki for the RISE Bantamweight (-55kg) title at RISE 174 on December 10, 2023. He won the fight by unanimous decision, with scores of 50–47, 50–47 and 50–48.

Osaki was expected Aiman Lahmar at RISE 178 on May 19, 2024. Lahmar withdrew from the fight on May 7, due to knee and hip injuries, and was replaced by Samvel Babayan. Babayan was himself forced to withdraw with visa issues and was replaced by Yodbuadang 3rdplacegym.

Osaki made his first RISE Bantamweight (-55kg) title defense against Ryunosuke Omori at RISE 181 on August 31, 2024. He retained the title by way of unanimous decision, with scores of 49–47, 50–47 and 50–46. Osaki was able to knock his opponent down once, with a right straight in the opening round.

Osaki made his ONE Championship debut against Huo Xiaolong at ONE Friday Fights 86 on November 8, 2024. He won the fight by unanimous decision.

Osaki faced the former RISE featherweight champion Keisuke Monguchi in a bantamweight non-title bout at RISE Fire Ball on May 11, 2025. He won the fight by second-round technical knockout.

Osaki faced Djillali Kharroubi in a non-title bout at RISE 191 on August 30, 2025. He won the fight by unanimous decision.

Osaki faced Wuttikorn Suannamtankiri at RISE 193, on November 9, 2025. He won the bout via TKO in the third round, finishing Suannamtankiri with punches.

Osaki faced Shiro at RISE EL DORADO 2026, on March 28, 2026, in a rematch, this time for Shiro's RISE World Bantamweight (-55kg) Title. He won the bout via unanimous decision, dropping Shiro in round three.

Osaki made his Muay Thai return in his Rajadamnern World Series debut at RWS 200, on June 27, 2026. He faced Chaitone Wor. Auracha for the RWS Interim Super Bantamweight (122 lbs) Title. He won the bout via TKO in round one, knocking Auracha out with punches.

== Championships and accomplishments ==
=== Professional ===
- J-NETWORK
  - 2018 J-NETWORK Super Flyweight Champion
- World Muay Thai Council
  - 2018 WMC Japan Super Flyweight Champion
- Battle of Muay Thai
  - 2021 BOM Bantamweight Champion
- RISE
  - 2023 RISE Bantamweight (-55kg) Champion
    - One successful title defense
  - 2026 RISE World Bantamweight (-55kg) Champion
- Rajadamnern Stadium
  - 2026 interim Rajadamnern Stadium Super Bantamweight (122 lbs) Champion

=== Amateur ===
- 2013 Muay Thai Windy Super Fight -40 kg Champion
- 2014 All Japan Jr. Kick -45 kg Champion
- 2015 J-NETWORK All Japan A-league -53 kg Winner & Spirit Award

== Fight record ==
Professional Kickboxing & Muay Thai record
40 Wins (22 (T)KO's), 7 Losses, 1 Draws, 1 No Contest
Date	Result	Opponent	Event	Location	Method	Round	Time
2026-12-20		(Japan) Masashi Kumura	RISE World Series 2026 Tokyo Final -55kg Tournament, Quarterfinals	Tokyo, Japan			
2026-10-10	Loss	(Thailand) Petchsila Wor.Auracha	Rajadamnern World Series - Knocktober Fest	Bangkok, Thailand	Decision (Unanimous)	5	3:00
For the Rajadamnern Stadium Super Bantamweight (122 lbs) title.
2026-06-27	Win	(Thailand) Chaitone Wor.Auracha	Rajadamnern World Series 200	Bangkok, Thailand	KO (Punches)	1	2:31
Wins the interim Rajadamnern Stadium Super Bantamweight (122 lbs) title.
2026-03-28	Win	(Japan) Shiro	RISE ELDORADO 2026	Tokyo, Japan	Decision (Unanimous)	5	3:00
Wins the RISE World Bantamweight (-55kg) title.
2025-11-09	Win	(Thailand) Wuttikorn Suannamtankiri	RISE 193	Tokyo, Japan	TKO (Punches)	3	2:16
2025-08-30	Win	(France) Djillali Kharroubi	RISE 191	Tokyo, Japan	Decision (Unanimous)	3	3:00
2025-05-11	Win	(Japan) Keisuke Monguchi	RISE Fire Ball	Nagoya, Japan	TKO (Referee stoppage)	2	2:17
2024-11-08	Win	(China) Huo Xiaolong	ONE Friday Fights 86, Lumpinee Stadium	Bangkok, Thailand	Decision (Unanimous)	3	3:00
2024-08-31	Win	(Japan) Ryunosuke Omori	RISE 181	Tokyo, Japan	Decision (Unanimous)	5	3:00
Defends the RISE Bantamweight (-55kg) title.
2024-05-19	Win	(Thailand) Yodbuadaeng 3rdplaceGym	RISE 178	Tokyo, Japan	KO (Left hook to the body)	2	1:49
2023-12-10	Win	(Japan) Masahiko Suzuki	RISE 174	Tokyo, Japan	Decision (Unanimous)	5	3:00
Wins the RISE Bantamweight (-55kg) title.
2023-08-26	Win	(Japan) Yugo Kato	RISE World Series 2023 - 2nd Round	Tokyo, Japan	Decision (Unanimous)	3	3:00
2023-05-28	Win	(Japan) Ryoga Terayama	RISE 168	Tokyo, Japan	TKO (3 Knockdowns)	2	1:56
2023-02-23	Draw	(Japan) Ryoga Terayama	RISE 165: RISE 20th Memorial event	Tokyo, Japan	Tech. Decision (Majority)	3	1:54
2022-12-25	Win	(Japan) Seiki Ueyama	RISE WORLD SERIES / SHOOTBOXING-KINGS 2022	Tokyo, Japan	Decision (Unanimous)	3	3:00
2022-10-15	Loss	(Japan) Shiro	RISE WORLD SERIES 2022	Tokyo, Japan	Ext.R Decision (Unanimous)	4	3:00
2022-07-29	Win	(Japan) Jyosei	RISE 160	Tokyo, Japan	TKO (Three knockdowns)	1	1:35
2022-05-28	Win	(Japan) Yugo Kato	NO KICK NO LIFE	Tokyo, Japan	TKO (Doctor stoppage)	4	2:20
2022-03-27	Win	(Japan) Tatsuto	RISE 156	Tokyo, Japan	Decision (Unanimous)	3	3:00
2021-07-18	Win	(Japan) Azusa Kaneko	RISE WORLD SERIES 2021 - Dead or Alive Tournament, Reserve Fight	Osaka, Japan	Decision (Unanimous)	3	3:00
2021-04-11	Win	(Japan) Kaito Fukuda	BOM WAVE 04 – Get Over The COVID-19	Yokohama, Japan	Decision (Unanimous)	5	3:00
Wins Battle Of MuayThai Bantamweight title.
2021-01-30	Win	(Japan) Kyosuke	RISE 145	Tokyo, Japan	KO (Low Kick)	2	
2020-12-06	Win	(Thailand) Sanchai TeppenGym	BOM WAVE 03 ~ Get Over The COVID-19	Yokohama, Japan	Decision (Split)	5	3:00
2020-09-04	Win	(Japan) Kazuya Okuwaki	RISE 142	Tokyo, Japan	KO (High Kick)	1	2:32
2019-11-04	Loss	(Japan) Jin Mandokoro	RISE 135	Tokyo, Japan	Decision (Unanimous)	3	3:00
2019-10-04	Win	(Japan) Takumi Hamada	KNOCK OUT X REBELS	Tokyo, Japan	Decision (Unanimous)	3	3:00
2019-09-10	Win	(Thailand) Kotchasarn Sor Jor Toipaedriew	Lumpinee Stadium	Bangkok, Thailand	KO (Left Hook to the Body)	2	
2019-08-04	Win	(Japan) Naoki Ishikawa	KICK ORIGIN	Tokyo, Japan	KO (Left Uppercut)	3	
2019-05-26	Loss	(Japan) Koudai	HOOST CUP KINGS NAGOYA 6	Nagoya, Japan	Ext.R Decision (Majority)	4	3:00
For the HOOST CUP -53kg title.
2019-04-20	Win	(Japan) Yuya Kosaka	Norainu Matsuri 5 Mamoruna Semeru ! Haru Nanda	Tokyo, Japan	KO (Right Cross)	2	1:12
2019-02-11	Loss	(Japan) Yoshiho Tane	KNOCK OUT 2019 WINTER	Tokyo, Japan	TKO (Punches)	5	0:51
2019-01-16	Win	(Japan) Yoshiki Tane	ROAD TO KNOCK OUT Vol. 3	Tokyo, Japan	KO (Punches)	2	1:48
2018-12-15	Win	(Thailand) Khotchasarn Wor.Wiwatnanon	Lumpinee Stadium	Bangkok, Thailand	KO (Left Hook to the body)	2	
2018-10-20	Win	(Japan) Masanori Matsuzaki	J-KICK 2018～4th～	Tokyo, Japan	Decision (Unanimous)	5	3:00
Wins J-NETWORK Super Flyweight title.
2018-09-23	Win	(Japan) Satoshi Katashima	Muay Lok 2018 Challenge	Tokyo, Japan	TKO (Left Elbow)	4	2:39
Wins the WMC Japan Super Flyweight title.
2018-08-19	Win	(Japan) Tatsuya Hibata	J-NETWORK J-KICK 3rd	Tokyo, Japan	KO (Left Elbow)	2	
2018-07-15	Win	(Japan) MASA BRAVELY	Muay Lok 2018 Global	Tokyo, Japan	Decision (Unanimous)	3	3:00
2018-05-20	Win	(Japan) Yuya Hayashi	HOOST CUP KINGS NAGOYA 4	Nagoya, Japan	TKO	3	2:05
2018-03-17	Loss	(Thailand) Norangnoi Korsenchun	Lumpinee Stadium	Bangkok, Thailand	Decision	5	3:00
2017-12-10	Win	(Japan) Mori	J-NEXUS 2017～J-NETWORK 20th Anniversary～NIGHT	Tokyo, Japan	KO	2	
2017-09-30	Win	(Japan) Kazane	Hoost Cup KINGS NAGOYA 3	Nagoya, Japan	Decision (Unanimous)	3	3:00
2017-08-20	Win	(Thailand)	Suk Wan Kingtong	Saraburi, Thailand	KO	2	
2017-07-23	Win	(Japan) JIRO	J-FIGHT & J-GIRLS 2017～J-NETWORK 20th Anniversary～5th	Tokyo, Japan	KO (Left Middle Kick)	1	1:29
2017-05-28	Win	(Japan) Masayoshi Kunimoto	HOOST CUP STAND FIGHTING NETWORK KING	Nagoya, Japan	Decision (Unanimous)	3	3:00
2017-03-05	NC	(Japan) Atsumu	Muay Lok 2017 1st	Tokyo, Japan	Doctor Stop (Head clash)	1	
2016-11-20	Win	(Japan) Takenari Izumi	HOOST CUP STAND FIGHTING NETWORK KING	Nagoya, Japan	TKO (Left Knee)	1	2:15
2016-06-26	Loss	(Japan) Yuki Kojima	J-NETWORK J-FIGHT & J-GIRLS 2016 3rd	Tokyo, Japan	Decision (Majority)	3	3:00
2016-05-05	Win	(Japan) Idomu Tateshima	J-NETWORK J-KICK 2016～Honor the fighting spirits～2nd	Tokyo, Japan	Decision (Unanimous)	3	3:00
Legend: Win Loss Draw/No contest Notes

=== Amateur record ===
Amateur Kickboxing & Muay Thai record
Date	Result	Opponent	Event	Location	Method	Round	Time
2016-03-13	Win	(Japan) Wataru Suzuki	MuayThai Super Fight Suk Wan Kingthong vol.4	Tokyo, Japan	Decision	2	2:00
2016-03-13	Loss	(Japan) Tsubasa Kaneko	MuayThai Super Fight Suk Wan Kingthong vol.4	Tokyo, Japan	Decision	2	2:00
2015-11-22	Win	(Japan) Jukiya Ito	J-NETWORK Amateur A-League Tournament, Final	Tokyo, Japan	Decision (Unanimous)	3	2:00
Wins J-NETWORK All Japan A-League -53kg title.
2015-11-22	Win	(Japan) Hiroshi Watabe	J-NETWORK Amateur A-League Tournament, Semi Final	Tokyo, Japan	KO	1	3:00
2015-11-22	Win	(Japan) Yuki Miyashita	J-NETWORK Amateur A-League Tournament, Quarter Final	Tokyo, Japan	KO	1	1:30
2015-07-26	Win	(Japan) Hideaki Hishinuma	J-NETWORK All Japan A-league -53 kg, Final	Tokyo, Japan	Decision (Unanimous)		
2015-07-26	Win	(Japan) Yusei Sakurai	J-NETWORK All Japan A-league -53 kg, Semi Final	Tokyo, Japan	Decision (Unanimous)		
2014-08-17	Win	(Japan) Haruto Yasumoto	MUAYTHAI WINDY SUPER FIGHT vol.17	Tokyo, Japan	Decision (Unanimous)	3	2:00
2014-06-29	Win	(Japan) Haruto Abe	Muay Thai WINDY Super Fight vol.16, Final	Tokyo, Japan	TKO (Knee)	3	0:48
2014-06-29	Win	(Japan) Kohei Watanabe	Muay Thai WINDY Super Fight vol.16, Semi Final	Tokyo, Japan	Decision		
2014-04-27	Draw	(Japan) Yuuta Sasaki	Muay Lok 2014 - 1st	Tokyo, Japan	Decision (Unanimous)	3	2:00
2014-03-30	Win	(Japan) Takasuke Sekimoto	3rd All Japan Jr. Kick -55 kg, Final	Tokyo, Japan	Decision		
Wins 2014 All Japan Jr Kick -45kg title.
2014-03-30	Win	(Japan)	3rd All Japan Jr. Kick -55 kg, Semi Final	Tokyo, Japan	Decision		
2014-01-19	Win	(Japan)	BRIDGE one match challenge 28th	Japan	Decision	2	1:30
2013-08-11	Win	(Japan) Asato Kataoka	Muay Thai WINDY Super Fight vol.14	Tokyo, Japan	Decision	5	1:30
Wins Windy Super Fight -40kg title.
2013-03-30	Loss	(Thailand) Toursak Sakbanton	Muay Thai Windy Super Fight	Trang province, Thailand	Decision		
2012-11-23	Loss	(Japan) Kaishuu Harada	Hoost Cup Spirit 2	Nagoya, Japan	TKO	2	
2012-09-23	Win	(Japan) Ryuu Miyajima	BRIDGE one match challenge 22nd	Aichi Prefecture, Japan	Decision	3	2:00
2012-05-13	Win	(Japan) Kenshin Tomihira	BRIDGE one match challenge 20th	Aichi Prefecture, Japan	Decision	2	2:00
2012-03-04	Loss	(Japan) Kouki Yamada	BRIDGE one match challenge 19th	Aichi Prefecture, Japan	Decision	2	1:30
2012-03-04	Win	(Japan) Shonosuke Suzu	BRIDGE one match challenge 19th	Aichi Prefecture, Japan	Decision	2	1:30
2011-10-23	Win	(Japan) Jou Hiromatsu	BRIDGE one match challenge 20th	Nagoya, Japan	Decision (Unanimous)	2	2:00
2011-10-16	Win	(Japan) Kenji Kawada	BRIDGE one match challenge 18th	Nagoya, Japan	Decision (Unanimous)	2	1:30
2011-10-16	Win	(Japan) Tomoya Hiratsuka	BRIDGE one match challenge 18th	Nagoya, Japan	Decision (Unanimous)	2	1:30
2011-09-19	Win	(Japan) Kenshin Tomihira	HEAT NEW AGE	Aichi Prefecture, Japan	Decision (Unanimous)	2	2:00
2011-07-03	Loss	(Japan) Yuuta Sasaki	Muay Thai WINDY Super Fight in NAGOYA ～Muay Typhoon!～	Nagoya, Japan	Decision (Unanimous)	2	2:00
2011-05-22	Win	(Japan) Kaito Matsuda	Shoot Boxing Challenge 27	Nagoya, Japan	Decision (Unanimous)	2	2:00
2011-04-02	Win	(Japan) Kippei Niina	MuayLok 2011 2nd	Nagoya, Japan	Decision (Unanimous)	2	2:00
2011-02-20	Win	(Japan) Ren Shimizu	Shoot Boxing Challenge 26	Nagoya, Japan	Decision (Unanimous)	2	2:00
2010-11-07	Win	(Japan) Yuuto Narusawa	BRIDGE one match challenge 15th	Aichi Prefecture, Japan	Decision (Unanimous)	2	2:00
2010-10-03	Win	(Japan) Yuusuke Watanabe	Shoot Boxing Challenge 24	Aichi Prefecture, Japan	TKO	1	
Legend: Win Loss Draw/No contest Notes

== See also ==
- List of male kickboxers
