= Masahiko Suzuki =

Japanese kickboxer

- Born: 鈴木真彦; February 21, 1997 (age 29); Yao, Osaka, Japan
- Height: 168 cm (5 ft 6 in)
- Weight: 55.0 kg (121.3 lb; 8.66 st)
- Division: Flyweight
- Style: Kickboxing
- Stance: Orthodox
- Fighting out of: Sakai, Osaka, Japan
- Team: Shoken Juku (2013); Yamaguchi Dojo (2014-2023); Unaffiliated (2023-); Team Kotobuki (2024-Present)
- Years active: 2013 - present

Kickboxing record
- Total: 51
- Wins: 40
- By knockout: 22
- Losses: 11
- By knockout: 1

Masahiko Suzuki (Japanese: 鈴木真彦, Suzuki Masahiko; born February 21, 1997) is a Japanese kickboxer, currently competing in the bantamweight division of RISE. He is the former RISE Bantamweight Champion, having held the title between 2018 and 2023.

As of August 2023, he is ranked as the third best flyweight (-56.7 kg) kickboxer in the world by Combat Press and the third best super flyweight (-55 kg) kickboxer by Beyond Kickboxing. Between October 2019 and August 2020, he was ranked in the strawweight top ten by Combat Press, and as a top ten flyweight since September 2020.

== Kickboxing career ==
=== DEEP KICK ===
==== Early career ====
Suzuki made his professional debut against Shohei Morishita at DEEP☆KICK 15 on May 12, 2013. He won the fight by a first-round technical knockout, as he needed just 17 seconds to force a referee stoppage. Suzuki was booked to face Ryusei Narukawa at DEEP☆KICK 16 on July 14, 2013, in his second professional appearance. He won the fight by a narrowly contested unanimous decision, with all three judges scoring the bout 30–29 in his favor.

Suzuki moved up from -53 to -55 kg for his next fight, a bout with Yuji at DEEP☆KICK 17 on September 22, 2013. He won the fight by a third-round knockout. These three victories earned Suzuki a #6 ranking in the DEEP KICK -55 kg division, as well as a fight with the #4 ranked contender Yoshiki Nakagawa at DEEP☆KICK 18 on December 15, 2013. He won the fight by unanimous decision, with scores of 30–29, 30–29 and 30–28.

After amassing a four-fight winning streak, Suzuki was placed in the 2014 DEEP KICK -55 kg Next Challenger tournament, held to determine the next challenger for the divisional kingpin Kazuki Tanaka. Suzuki faced Yuji in the semifinals, held on DEEP☆KICK 20 on April 27, 2014. He won the rematch with Yuji by a first-round technical knockout. He advanced to the tournament finals, held at DEEP☆KICK 21 on July 20, 2014, where he faced Yoshiki Nakagawa. The fight was ruled a majority decision draw after the first three rounds, with two judges scoring it an event 30–30 and 29–29 draw, while the third judge scored it 30–29 for Suzuki. Suzuki was awarded a split decision after an extra fourth round was contested.

==== DEEP KICK champion ====
The 17-year old Suzuki was booked to challenge Kazuki Tanaka for the DEEP KICK -55 kg championship at DEEP☆KICK 22 on September 28, 2014, in what was Tanaka's first title defense. He captured his first professional piece of silverware with a third-round technical knockout of Tanaka. He knocked Tanaka down once prior to the stoppage, with a right hook in the first round.

Suzuki took part in the REBELS -55 kg tournament, organized to crown the new champion, and was scheduled to face Masahide Kudo in the semifinals at REBELS.33 on January 25, 2015. He lost the fight by split decision, after an extra fourth round was fought. Suzuki next faced Wataru Yamato at NJKF 2015 2nd on April 5, 2015. He lost the fight by majority decision, with scores of 30–28, 30–27 and 28–28. Despite suffering two consecutive losses, Suzuki was nonetheless scheduled to face the future pound for pound great Tenshin Nasukawa in the quarterfinals of the BLADE -55 kg tournament on August 1, 2015. He was twice knocked down in the first two minutes of the opening round, which resulted in an automatic technical knockout loss for him.

Suzuki made his first DEEP KICK -55 kg title defense against Unao Hatomune at DEEP☆KICK 28 on December 23, 2015. He won the fight by a second-round technical knockout, successfully snapping his three-fight losing streak.

=== Rise up the ranks ===
==== Winning the Innovation title ====
Suzuki faced the NKB bantamweight champion Ryo Takahashi in a non-title bout at HOOST CUP KINGS ROAD on March 20, 2016. He won the fight by a majority decision, with two scorecards of 30–29 and one even scorecard of 29–29. Suzuki next challenged David Chibana for the INNOVATION Bantamweight (-55 kg) championship at JAPAN KICKBOXING INNOVATION Join Forces-1 on June 5, 2016, in what was Chibana's first title defense. He won the fight by a second-round technical knockout.

Suzuki next fought in two more non-title bouts. Suzuki first faced Shuto Miyazaki at DEEP☆KICK 30 on July 17, 2016. He knocked Miyazaki down with a knee at the 2:08 minute mark of the opening round. Although his opponent was able to beat the count, he was unsteady on his feet, prompting the referee to wave the bout off. In his second non-title bout, Suzuki faced Takeshi Katsuoka at JAPAN KICKBOXING INNOVATION Join Forces-3 on September 25, 2016. He won the fight by unanimous decision, with all three judges scoring the bout 30–27 in his favor.

==== Winning the WBC Muay thai title ====
Suzuki faced the WPMF interim and WMC World bantamweight champion Takaaki Hayashi for the vacant WBC Muay Thai Japan -55 kg championship at NJKF 2016 7th ～NJKF20th Anniversary on November 27, 2016. He won the fight by a first-round knockout, flooring Hayashi with a left hook in the final minute of the opening round.

Suzuki made his second DEEP KICK -55 kg title defense against Kazuma Sasaki at DEEP☆KICK 32 on April 9, 2017. He retained the title by a second-round technical knockout. Suzuki made his first WBC Muay Thai Japan -55 kg title defense against Takuma Oota at JAPAN KICKBOXING INNOVATION Champions Carnival 2017 II on June 25, 2017. He won the fight by unanimous decision, with scores of 49–47, 49–48 and 49–48.

==== Winning the HOOST CUP title ====
Suzuki challenged the HOOST CUP and MA Japan Bantamweight (-55 kg) champion KING Kyosuke for his HOOST CUP championship at HOOST CUP KINGS OSAKA 2 on November 26, 2017. He captured the title by unanimous decision, with all three judges scoring the bout 30–28 in his favor.

Suzuki faced the MA Japan Super bantamweight champion Masaki Takeuchi in a non-title bout at KNOCK OUT Sakura Burst on April 14, 2018. He won the fight by a second-round technical knockout, after knocking Takeuchi down thrice by the 1:14 minute mark of the round.

=== RISE ===
==== Bantamweight tournament ====
Suzuki made his RISE promotional debut against Rasta Kido at RISE 126, in the quarterfinals of the RISE bantamweight (-55 kg) tournament, on July 16, 2018. He won the fight by unanimous decision, with all three judges awarding him a 30–28 scorecard. Suzuki was expected to face Yugo Flyskygym in the penultimate bout of the tournament at RISE 127 on September 16, 2018. The bout was later cancelled, as Yugo suffered from severe dehydration during his weight cut and was rushed to the hospital for treatment and observation.

Suzuki was given a bye and faced Yuki Masato for the vacant RISE Bantamweight championship at RISE 129 on November 17, 2018. He won the fight by a third-round technical knockout. Suzuki twice knocked Masato down in the second round, but times with a right straight, but was unable to finish him. The referee finally waved the bout off at the 1:15 minute mark of the very next round, as Suzuki landed a number of punches on an unresponsive Masato.

==== Bantamweight title reign ====
Suzuki faced Duk Jae Yoon in a non-title bout at RISE World Series 2019: First Round on March 10, 2019. He needed just 92 seconds to win the fight by technical knockout. Suzuki made his first WBC Muay Thai Japan title defense against Shun YAMATO at NJKF Border Kickboxing on May 12, 2019. He retained the title by a fourth-round technical knockout.

Suzuki faced Emanuele Tetti Menichelli in a non-title bout at Rise World Series 2019 on July 21, 2019. He won the fight by a second-round knockout, stopping Menichelli with a left hook to the body. Suzuki fought another non-title bout against the RISE Super Flyweight (-53 kg) champion Toki Tamaru at Rise World Series 2019 Final Round on September 16, 2019. The fight was ruled a majority decision draw after the first three rounds were contested, with two judges scoring it an even 29–29 draw and one judge scoring it 30–29 for Tamaru. Suzuki was awarded a unanimous decision after an extension round was fought.

Suzuki made his first RISE title defense against Rasta Kido at RISE 136 on January 13, 2020. They previously faced each other in the quarterfinals of the RISE bantamweight tournament on July 16, 2018, with Suzuki winning by unanimous decision. He was more convincing in the rematch, dropping Rasta with a right straight in the fourth round for a stoppage victory.

==== Dead or Alive tournament ====
Suzuki faced the former two-weight Lumpinee Stadium champion Visanlek Meibukai in a non-title bout at Rise on Abema on July 12, 2020. The event was held in an empty arena, as no fans were allowed to attend due to measures imposed to combat the COVID-19 pandemic. He won the fight by a third-round technical knockout.

On September 12, it was announced that Suzuki would be one of four participants in the 2020 RISE "Dead or Alive" one-day tournament, held to determine the next opponent for Tenshin Nasukawa. Aside from a bout with the pound for pound great, the winner was also set to receive a ¥5,000,000 prize. Suzuki was scheduled to face Rui Ebata in the semifinals, at RISE DEAD OR ALIVE 2020 Osaka on November 1, 2020. Suzuki won the fight by unanimous decision, with three scorecards of 30–28. The bout was later named as "Fight of the Year" by Combat Press. Suzuki advanced to the tournament finals, where he faced last year's RISE -58 kg World Series runner-up Shiro. He lost the fight by a dominant unanimous decision, as all three judges scored every round of the bout for Shiro.

==== Continued title reign ====
Suzuki faced Soma Tameda at RISE Eldorado 2021 on February 28, 2021. He won the fight by a first-round knockout. Suzuki was booked to face Tepparith Joe Gym at RISE WORLD SERIES 2021 on July 18, 2021. He won the fight by unanimous decision, with scores of 30–28, 30–28 and 29–29.

Suzuki fought a rematch with Tenshin Nasukawa at RISE WORLD SERIES 2021 Yokohama on September 23, 2021, in Nasukawa's second-to-last fight with the promotion. He lost by unanimous decision. Suzuki fought another rematch two months later, as he was booked to face Rui Ebata at RISE World Series 2021 Osaka 2 on November 14, 2021. He won the fight by a first-round knockout, flooring Ebata with a right cross just past the midway point of the opening round.

Suzuki was booked to make his second RISE bantamweight title defense against Kengo at RISE 154 on January 23, 2022. He won the fight by a first-round technical knockout. Suzuki was next booked to face Mutsuki Ebata at RISE El Dorado 2022 on April 2, 2022. He won the fight by unanimous decision after scoring a knockdown in the second round.

Suzuki faced the reigning K-1 World GP Super Bantamweight champion Akihiro Kaneko at The Match 2022 on June 19, 2022. The bout was scheduled for the undercard of The Match 2022, headlined by Takeru Segawa and Tenshin Nasukawa. He won the fight by majority decision, with scores of 30–28, 30–29 and 29–29.

Suzuki faced the former Shootboxing super bantamweight champion Seiki Ueyama at RISE WORLD SERIES 2022 Osaka on August 21, 2022. He won the fight by unanimous decision, after an extra fourth round was contested.

Suzuki faced the former ISKA World Bantamweight champion and the 2020 RISE Dead or Alive tournament winner Shiro at RISE WORLD SERIES / SHOOTBOXING-KINGS on December 25, 2022. He lost the fight by majority decision, with scores of 30–29, 30–29 and 29–29.

Suzuki faced the two-time K-1 World Super bantamweight Grand Prix runner-up Masashi Kumura at K-1 World GP 2023: K'Festa 6 on March 12, 2023. He lost the fight by unanimous decision, with all three judges scoring the bout 30–28 for Kumura. Suzuki was knocked down by a jab early in the second round, which proved to be the pivotal moment of the bout, as the other two rounds were scored as a draw.

Suzuki faced Imad Salhi in a non-title bout at RISE 171 on August 18, 2023. He won the fight by a second-round knockout.

Suzuki made his third RISE Bantamweight (-55kg) title defense against mandatory challenger and top-ranked RISE contender Koki Osaki at RISE 174 on December 10, 2023. He lost the fight by unanimous decision, with scores of 50–47, 50–47 and 50–48.

==== Later RISE career ====
Suzuki faced the reigning K-1 Super Bantamweight champion Akihiro Kaneko in a cross-promotional bout at RISE ELDORADO 2024 on March 17, 2024. He lost the fight by unanimous decision, with all three judges awarding Kaneko a 30–25 scorecard, as Suzuki was twice knocked down during the bout.

Suzuki faced Jhaymie Gayman at RISE WORLD SERIES 2024 Final on December 21, 2024. He won the fight by a first-round knockout.

Suzuki faced Ryunosuke Omori at RISE 187 on April 19, 2025. He won the fight by unanimous decision, with scores of 29—29, 29—28 and 30—28.

Suzuki faced Daiki Toita at RISE WORLD SERIES 2025 Yokohama on June 21, 2025. He won the fight by unanimous decision, with three scorecards of 30—28 in his favor.

Suzuki faced Yugo Kato at RISE 191 on August 30, 2025. He won the fight by unanimous decision.

== Championships and accomplishments ==
=== Professional ===
- K-1
  - 2023 K-1 Awards "Fight of the Year" (vs. Masashi Kumura)
- RISE
  - 2018 RISE Bantamweight Championship
    - Two successful title defenses
- HOOST CUP
  - 2017 HOOST CUP Japan Bantamweight Championship
- World Boxing Council Muaythai
  - 2016 WBC Muay Thai Japan Bantamweight Championship
    - Two successful title defenses
- DEEP KICK
  - 2014 DEEP KICK -55 kg Next Challenger Tournament Winner
  - 2014 DEEP KICK -55 kg Championship
    - Two successful title defenses
- JAPAN KICKBOXING INNOVATION
  - 2016 INNOVATION Bantamweight Championship

=== Amateur ===
- DEEP KICK
  - 2011 TOP RUN -50 Champion
  - 2010 TOP RUN -45 kg Champion

=== Awards ===
- 2020 Combat Press Fight of the Year (vs Rui Ebata)

== Fight record ==
Kickboxing record
40 Wins (22 (T)KO's), 11 Losses, 0 Draw, 0 No Contest
Date	Result	Opponent	Event	Location	Method	Round	Time
2026-12-20		(Thailand) Jaroensuk BoonlannaMuaythai	RISE World Series 2026 Tokyo Final -55kg Tournament, Quarterfinals	Tokyo, Japan			
2026-09-19	Win	(France) Djillali Kharroubi	RISE World Series 2026 Tokyo 2	Tokyo, Japan	Decision (unanimous)	3	3:00
2026-03-28	Win	(Japan) Ryoya Ito	RISE ELDORADO 2026	Tokyo, Japan	TKO (3 Knockdowns)	1	2:24
2025-12-14	Loss	(Japan) Ryu Hanaoka	RISE 194	Tokyo, Japan	Decision (Unanimous)	3	3:00
2025-08-30	Win	(Japan) Yugo Kato	RISE 191	Tokyo, Japan	Decision (Unanimous)	3	3:00
2025-06-21	Win	(Japan) Daiki Toita	RISE WORLD SERIES 2025 Yokohama	Yokohama, Japan	Decision (Unanimous)	3	3:00
2025-04-19	Loss	(Japan) Ryunosuke Omori	RISE 187	Tokyo, Japan	Decision (Unanimous)	3	3:00
2024-12-21	Win	(Philippines) Jhaymie Gayman	RISE WORLD SERIES 2024 Final	Chiba, Japan	KO (Right cross)	1	1:26
2024-03-17	Loss	(Japan) Akihiro Kaneko	RISE ELDORADO 2024	Tokyo, Japan	Decision (Unanimous)	3	3:00
2023-12-10	Loss	(Japan) Koki Osaki	RISE 174	Tokyo, Japan	Decision (Unanimous)	5	3:00
Loses the RISE Bantamweight (-55kg) title.
2023-08-18	Win	(Spain) Imad Salhi	RISE 171	Tokyo, Japan	KO (Right cross)	2	2:57
2023-03-12	Loss	(Japan) Masashi Kumura	K-1 World GP 2023: K'Festa 6	Tokyo, Japan	Decision (Unanimous)	3	3:00
2022-12-25	Loss	(Japan) Shiro	RISE WORLD SERIES / SHOOTBOXING-KINGS 2022	Tokyo, Japan	Decision (Majority)	3	3:00
2022-08-21	Win	(Japan) Seiki Ueyama	RISE WORLD SERIES OSAKA 2022	Osaka, Japan	Ext.R Decision (Unanimous)	4	3:00
2022-06-19	Win	(Japan) Akihiro Kaneko	THE MATCH 2022	Tokyo, Japan	Decision (Majority)	3	3:00
2022-04-02	Win	(Japan) Mutsuki Ebata	RISE ELDORADO 2022	Tokyo, Japan	Decision (Unanimous)	3	3:00
2022-01-23	Win	(Japan) Kengo	RISE 154	Tokyo, Japan	TKO (Punches)	1	2:04
Defends the RISE Bantamweight (-55kg) title.
2021-11-14	Win	(Japan) Rui Ebata	RISE World Series 2021 Osaka 2	Osaka, Japan	KO (Right Cross)	1	1:49
2021-09-23	Loss	(Japan) Tenshin Nasukawa	RISE WORLD SERIES 2021 Yokohama	Yokohama, Japan	Decision (Unanimous)	3	3:00
2021-07-18	Win	(Thailand) Tepparith Joe Gym	RISE WORLD SERIES 2021 Osaka	Osaka, Japan	Decision (Unanimous)	3	3:00
2021-02-28	Win	(Japan) Soma Tameda	RISE Eldorado 2021	Yokohama, Japan	KO (Right Cross)	1	1:14
2020-11-01	Loss	(Japan) Shiro	RISE DEAD OR ALIVE 2020 Osaka, Final	Osaka, Japan	Decision (Unanimous)	3	3:00
For the RISE Dead or Alive 2020 Tournament -55kg title.
2020-11-01	Win	(Japan) Rui Ebata	RISE DEAD OR ALIVE 2020 Osaka, Semi Final	Osaka, Japan	Decision (Unanimous)	3	3:00
2020-07-12	Win	(Thailand) Visanlek Meibukai	Rise on Abema	Tokyo, Japan	TKO (Punches)	3	0:47
2020-01-13	Win	(Japan) Rasta	RISE 136	Tokyo, Japan	KO (Straight Right)	4	2:49
Defends the RISE Bantamweight (-55kg) title.
2019-09-16	Win	(Japan) Toki Tamaru	Rise World Series 2019 Final Round	Chiba, Japan	Ext.R Decision (Unanimous)	4	3:00
2019-07-21	Win	(Italy) Emanuele Tetti Menichelli	Rise World Series 2019	Osaka, Japan	KO (Left Hook to the Body)	2	1:30
2019-05-12	Win	(Japan) Shun YAMATO	NJKF Border Kickboxing	Osaka, Japan	KO (Punches)	4	1:32
Defends the WBC Muay Thai Japan -55kg title.
2019-03-10	Win	(South Korea) Duk Jae Yoon	RISE World Series 2019: First Round	Ota, Japan	TKO (Referee Stoppage)	1	1:32
2018-11-17	Win	(Japan) Yuki Masato	RISE 129, Tournament Final	Tokyo, Japan	TKO (Punches)	3	1:15
Wins the vacant RISE Bantamweight (-55kg) title.
2018-07-16	Win	(Japan) Rasta	RISE 126, Tournament Quarterfinals	Tokyo, Japan	Decision (Unanimous)	3	3:00
2018-04-14	Win	(Japan) Masaki Takeuchi	KNOCK OUT Sakura Burst	Kanagawa, Japan	TKO (3 Knockdowns)	2	1:14
2017-11-26	Win	(Japan) KING Kyosuke	HOOST CUP KINGS OSAKA 2	Osaka, Japan	Decision (Unanimous)	3	3:00
Wins the HOOST CUP Japan -55kg title.
2017-06-25	Win	(Japan) Takuma Oota	JAPAN KICKBOXING INNOVATION Champions Carnival 2017 II	Tokyo, Japan	Decision (Unanimous)	5	3:00
Defends the WBC Muay Thai Japan -55kg title.
2017-04-09	Win	(Japan) Kazuma Sasaki	DEEP☆KICK 32	Osaka, Japan	TKO (Punches)	2	2:39
Defends the DEEP KICK -55kg title.
2016-11-27	Win	(Japan) Takaaki Hayashi	NJKF 2016 7th ～NJKF20th Anniversary	Tokyo, Japan	KO (Left Hook)	1	2:13
Wins the vacant WBC Muay Thai Japan -55kg title.
2016-09-25	Win	(Japan) Takeshi Katsuoka	JAPAN KICKBOXING INNOVATION Join Forces-3	Tokyo, Japan	Decision (Unanimous)	3	3:00
2016-07-17	Win	(Japan) Shuto Miyazaki	DEEP☆KICK 30	Osaka, Japan	TKO	1	2:08
2016-06-05	Win	(Japan) David Chibana	JAPAN KICKBOXING INNOVATION Join Forces-1	Tokyo, Japan	TKO (Referee Stoppage)	3	2:20
Wins INNOVATION Bantamweight title.
2016-03-20	Win	(Japan) Ryo Takahashi	HOOST CUP KINGS ROAD	Kyoto, Japan	Decision (Majority)	3	3:00
2015-12-23	Win	(Japan) Unao Hatomune	DEEP☆KICK 28	Osaka, Japan	TKO (Referee stoppage)	2	2:09
Defends the DEEP KICK -55kg title.
2015-08-01	Loss	(Japan) Tenshin Nasukawa	Blade.2 55 kg 2015 Tournament, Quarter Finals	Tokyo, Japan	KO (Punches)	1	1:31
2015-04-05	Loss	(Japan) Wataru Yamato	NJKF 2015 2nd	Osaka, Japan	Decision (Majority)	3	3:00
2015-01-25	Loss	(Japan) Masahide Kudo	REBELS.33, Tournament Semifinals	Tokyo, Japan	Ext.R Decision (Split)	4	3:00
2014-09-28	Win	(Japan) Kazuki Tanaka	DEEP☆KICK 22	Osaka, Japan	TKO (Left Hook)	3	0:26
Wins the DEEP KICK -55kg title.
2014-07-20	Win	(Japan) Yoshiki Nakagawa	DEEP☆KICK 21, Tournament Finals	Osaka, Japan	Ext.R Decision (Split)	4	3:00
Wins the DEEP KICK -55kg Next Challenger Tournament.
2014-04-27	Win	(Japan) Yuji	DEEP☆KICK 20, Tournament Semifinals	Osaka, Japan	TKO (Punches)	1	2:52
2013-12-15	Win	(Japan) Yoshiki Nakagawa	DEEP☆KICK 18	Osaka, Japan	Decision (Unanimous)	3	3:00
2013-09-22	Win	(Japan) Yuji	DEEP☆KICK 17	Osaka, Japan	KO	3	0:54
2013-07-14	Win	(Japan) Ryusei Narukawa	DEEP☆KICK 16	Osaka, Japan	Decision (Unanimous)	3	3:00
2013-05-12	Win	(Japan) Shohei Morishita	DEEP☆KICK 15	Osaka, Japan	TKO (Referee stoppage)	1	0:17
Legend: Win Loss Draw/No contest Notes

Amateur Kickboxing Record
Date	Result	Opponent	Event	Location	Method	Round	Time
2013-03-17	Loss	(Japan) Shuhei Kumura	NJKF 2013 2nd	Osaka, Japan	Decision	2	2:00
2013-02-10	Win	(Japan) Hiroki Tsunada	Double Impact III	Osaka, Japan	KO	2	1:36
2012-07-08	Loss	(Japan) Ryusei Narukawa	DEEP☆KICK 12, Freshmans Tournament Semi Final	Osaka, Japan	Ext.R Decision (Split)	3	2:00
2011-09-11	Win	(Japan) Kaji Hayate	M-1 Freshmans vol.3	Tokyo, Japan	Decision (Unanimous)	3	2:00
2011-07-31	Win	(Japan) Ryusei Narukawa	DEEP☆KICK 7	Osaka, Japan	Decision (Unanimous)	3	2:00
Wins the TOP RUN -50kg title.
2011-04-10	Win	(Japan) Jin Aso	DEEP☆KICK 6	Osaka, Japan	Decision (Majority)	2	2:00
Defends the TOP RUN -45kg title.
2010-12-12	Win	(Japan) Seiya Matsumoto	DEEP☆KICK 5	Osaka, Japan	Decision (Unanimous)	2	2:00
Wins the TOP RUN -45kg title.
Legend: Win Loss Draw/No contest Notes

== See also ==
- List of male kickboxers
