= 2022 in RISE =

Kickboxing events

Information
- First date: January 23
- Last date: December 25

Events
- Total events: 21

The year 2022 was the 19th year in the history of RISE, a Japanese kickboxing promotion.

RISE events were streamed on online service Abema TV.

== List of events ==
| # | Event Title | Date | Arena | Location |
|---|---|---|---|---|
| 1 | RISE 154 | January 23, 2022 | Korakuen Hall | Tokyo, Japan |
| 2 | RISE EVOL.10 & RISE GIRLS POWER.6 | February 12, 2022 | Shinjuku Face | Tokyo, Japan |
| 3 | RISE FIGHT CLUB | February 16, 2022 | Shinjuku Face | Tokyo, Japan |
| 4 | RISE 155 | February 23, 2022 | Korakuen Hall | Tokyo, Japan |
| 5 | RISE 156 | March 26, 2022 | Korakuen Hall | Tokyo, Japan |
| 6 | RISE ELDORADO 2022 | April 2, 2022 | Yoyogi National Gymnasium | Tokyo, Japan |
| 7 | RISE 157 | April 24, 2022 | Korakuen Hall | Tokyo, Japan |
| 8 | RISE.WEST | May 1, 2022 | Nishitetsu Hall | Fukuoka, Japan |
| 9 | RISE 158 | May 29, 2022 | Korakuen Hall | Tokyo, Japan |
| 10 | THE MATCH 2022 | June 19, 2022 | Tokyo Dome | Tokyo, Japan |
| 11 | RISE 159 | June 24, 2022 | Korakuen Hall | Tokyo, Japan |
| 12 | RISE 160 | July 29, 2022 | Korakuen Hall | Tokyo, Japan |
| 13 | RISE WORLD SERIES OSAKA 2022 | August 21, 2022 | EDION Arena Osaka | Osaka, Japan |
| 14 | RISE 161 | August 28, 2022 | Korakuen Hall | Tokyo, Japan |
| 15 | RISE WEST.17 | October 2, 2022 | Nishitetsu Hall | Fukuoka, Japan |
| 16 | RISE WORLD SERIES 2022 | October 15, 2022 | Ota City General Gymnasium | Tokyo, Japan |
| 17 | RISE 162 | October 30, 2022 | Korakuen Hall | Tokyo, Japan |
| 18 | RISE EVOL.11 | November 3, 2022 | Shinjuku Face | Tokyo, Japan |
| 19 | RISE WEST.18 | December 4, 2022 | Nishitetsu Hall | Fukuoka, Japan |
| 20 | RISE 163 | December 10, 2022 | Korakuen Hall | Tokyo, Japan |
| 21 | RISE WORLD SERIES / SHOOTBOXING-KINGS 2022 | December 25, 2022 | Ryōgoku Kokugikan | Tokyo, Japan |

== RISE 154 ==
RISE 154
- Promotion: RISE
- Date: January 23, 2022
- Venue: Korakuen Hall
- City: Tokyo, Japan

RISE 154 was a kickboxing event held by RISE on January 23, 2022, at the Korakuen Hall in Tokyo, Japan.

=== Background ===
A RISE Bantamweight (-55kg) Championship bout between champion Masahiko Suzuki and challenger Kengo served as the event headliner.

=== Fight Card ===
RISE 154
| Weight | | | | Method | Round | Time | Notes |
|---|---|---|---|---|---|---|---|
| Bantamweight 55 kg | (Japan) Masahiko Suzuki (c) | def. | (Japan) Kengo | KO (3 Knockdowns) | 1 | 2:04 | For the RISE Bantamweight (-55kg) title |
| Featherweight 57.5 kg | (Japan) Ryoga Hirano | def. | (Japan) Masaki Takeuchi | Decision (Unanimous) | 3 | 3:00 | |
| Super Lightweight 65 kg | (Japan) Takumi Sanekata | draw. | (Japan) Kazuma Mori | Ext.R Decision (Unanimous) | 4 | 3:00 | |
| Super Featherweight 60 kg | (Japan) Hyuma Hitachi | def. | (Japan) Taisei Iwagoe | KO (Right hook) | 2 | 2:57 | |
Masahide Kudo retirement ceremony
| Flyweight 51.5 kg | (Japan) Kuryu | def. | (Japan) Riku Kazushima | Decision (Unanimous) | 3 | 3:00 | |
| Featherweight 57.5 kg | (Japan) Daiki Toita | def. | (Japan) Hayato | Decision (Unanimous) | 3 | 3:00 | |
| Bantamweight 55 kg | (Japan) Kyosuke | def. | (Japan) KING Ryuzo | TKO (Referee stoppage) | 1 | 2:08 | |
| Catchweight 92 kg | (Japan) Kenta Nanbara | def. | (Japan) Miyagin | KO (Left high kick) | 1 | 1:04 | |
| Super Flyweight 53 kg | (Japan) Shota Toyama | def. | (Japan) Guriko Sato | Decision (Unanimous) | 3 | 3:00 | |
| Atomweight 46 kg | (Japan) Arina Kobayashi | def. | (Japan) Shoko JSK | KO (3 Knockdowns) | 2 | 2:57 | |

== Rise evol.10 & rise girls power.6 ==
RISE EVOL.10 & RISE GIRLS POWER.6
- Promotion: RISE
- Date: February 12, 2022
- Venue: Shinjuku Face
- City: Tokyo, Japan

RISE EVOL.10 & RISE GIRLS POWER.6 was a kickboxing event held by RISE on February 12, 2022, at Shinjuku Face in Tokyo, Japan.

=== Fight Card ===
RISE GIRLS POWER.6
| Weight | | | | Method | Round | Time | Notes |
|---|---|---|---|---|---|---|---|
| Mini Flyweight 49 kg | (Japan) Wakana Miyazaki | def. | (Japan) Erika | Decision (Majority) | 3 | 3:00 | |
| Atomweight 46 kg | (Japan) Koto Hiraoka | def. | (Japan) Suzuka Tabuchi | Decision (Unanimous) | 3 | 3:00 | |
| Flyweight 52 kg | (Japan) KOKOZ | def. | (Japan) Seina | Ext.R Decision (Unanimous) | 4 | 3:00 | |
| Flyweight 52 kg | (Japan) Moe Okura | def. | (Japan) Emi NFC | Decision (Unanimous) | 3 | 3:00 | |
| Catchweight 45.5 kg | (Japan) Rika Aimi | def. | (Japan) Seri JSK | TKO (Doctor stoppage) | 3 | 1:44 | |
RISE EVOL.10
| Featherweight 57.5 kg | (Japan) Naofumi Yamashina | def. | (Japan) Sota Fukushima | TKO (Referee stoppage) | 2 | 2:17 | |
| Super Featherweight 60 kg | (Japan) Yuki Morishita | def. | (Japan) Sho Sugimoto | KO (Knee) | 2 | 1:21 | |
| Lightweight 63 kg | (Japan) Yuta Ogawa | def. | (Mongolia) Delgemuru Kenshinhan | KO (Right hook) | 3 | 1:30 | |
| Super Flyweight 53 kg | (Japan) Yuga Hoshi | def. | (Japan) Shunnosuke | Decision (Unanimous) | 3 | 3:00 | |

== Rise fight club ==
RISE FIGHT CLUB
- Promotion: RISE
- Date: February 16, 2022
- Venue: Shinjuku Face
- City: Tokyo, Japan

RISE FIGHT CLUB was a kickboxing event held by RISE on February 16, 2022, at Shinjuku Face in Tokyo, Japan.

=== Background ===
The card is the first in a new brand of events for RISE which will exclusively hold fights in open finger gloves.

=== Fight Card ===
RISE FIGHT CLUB
| Weight | | | | Method | Round | Time | Notes |
|---|---|---|---|---|---|---|---|
| Super Lightweight 65 kg | (Japan) Hiroto Yamaguchi | def. | (Japan) Shuhei Higashi | Decision (Unanimous) | 3 | 3:00 | |
| Catchweight 66 kg | (Japan) Takamasa Abiko | def. | (Japan) Makoto Aiuchi | KO (Knee) | 1 | 1:51 | |
| Lightweight 63 kg | (Japan) Sota Kimura | def. | (Japan) Shuhei Higashi | Decision (Unanimous) | 3 | 3:00 | |
| Catchweight 64 kg | (Japan) Tatsuya Inaishi | draw. | (Japan) Yuto | Decision (Majority) | 3 | 3:00 | |
| Catchweight 59 kg | (Japan) YU-YA | def. | (Japan) Kenta Tanoue | TKO (Referee stoppage) | 2 | 1:21 | |
| Flyweight 51.5 kg | (Japan) Novo | def. | (Japan) Lion Osafune | TKO (Referee stoppage) | 1 | 1:37 | |

== RISE 155 ==
RISE 155
- Promotion: RISE
- Date: February 23, 2022
- Venue: Korakuen Hall
- City: Tokyo, Japan

RISE 155 was a kickboxing event held by RISE on February 23, 2022, at the Korakuen Hall in Tokyo, Japan.

=== Background ===
A super featherweight bout between Kazuma and Tepparith JoeGym was booked as the main event.

=== Fight Card ===
RISE 154
| Weight | | | | Method | Round | Time | Notes |
|---|---|---|---|---|---|---|---|
| Super Featherweight 60 kg | (Japan) Kazuma | def. | (Thailand) Tepparith JoeGym | TKO (3 Knockdowns) | 2 | 1:10 | |
| Atomweight 46 kg | (Japan) Koyuki Miyazaki | def. | (Japan) Momoka | Decision (Unanimous) | 3 | 3:00 | |
| Catchweight 59 kg | (Japan) Kensei Yamakawa | def. | (Japan) Yoshihisa Morimoto | KO (Referee stoppage) | 2 | 2:14 | |
| Welterweight 67.5 kg | (Japan) Ryoya Inai | def. | (Japan) Kosuke Takagi | Decision (Unanimous) | 3 | 3:00 | RISE Welterweight Tournament Semifinal |
| Featherweight 57.5 kg | (Japan) Keisuke Monguchi | def. | (Japan) Yoshinobu Ozaki | TKO (3 Knockdowns) | 1 | 1:51 | |
| Bantamweight 55 kg | (Japan) Yuki Kyotani | def. | (Japan) Takuya | TKO (Corner stoppage) | 2 | 0:49 | |
| Super Flyweight 53 kg | (Japan) Tsubasa | def. | (Japan) Atsumu | KO (Punches) | 2 | 1:11 | |
| Super Lightweight 65 kg | (Japan) Yutaro Asahi | def. | (Japan) Chappy Yoshinuma | Decision (Unanimous) | 3 | 3:00 | |
| Heavyweight 120 kg | (Japan) Koh Harigaya | def. | (Japan) Chan | Decision (Split) | 3 | 3:00 | |
| Middleweight 70 kg | (Japan) Shoma | def. | (Japan) Koki | Decision (Unanimous) | 3 | 3:00 | |
| Super Featherweight 60 kg | (Japan) Shigeki Fujii | def. | (Japan) Masanori Shimada | Decision (Unanimous) | 3 | 3:00 | |

== RISE 156 ==
RISE 156
- Promotion: RISE
- Date: March 27, 2022
- Venue: Korakuen Hall
- City: Tokyo, Japan

RISE 156 was a kickboxing event held by RISE on March 27, 2022, at the Korakuen Hall in Tokyo, Japan.

=== Background ===
A vacant RISE Featherweight (-57.5kg) championship bout between Taisei Umei and Ryoga Hirano was scheduled as the main event.

=== Fight Card ===
RISE 156
| Weight | | | | Method | Round | Time | Notes |
|---|---|---|---|---|---|---|---|
| Featherweight 57.5 kg | (Japan) Taisei Umei | def. | (Japan) Ryoga Hirano | Decision (Unanimous) | 5 | 3:00 | For the vacant RISE Featherweight (-57.5kg) title |
| Super Flyweight 53 kg | (Japan) Kazuki Osaki | def. | (Japan) Kanta Tabuchi | Decision (Majority) | 3 | 3:00 | |
| Welterweight 67.5 kg | (Japan) Ryota Nakano | def. | (Japan) Masashi Nakajima | Decision (Unanimous) | 3 | 3:00 | RISE Welterweight Tournament Semifinal |
| Featherweight 57.5 kg | (Japan) Koki Osaki | def. | (Japan) Tatsuto | Decision (Unanimous) | 3 | 3:00 | |
| Middleweight 70 kg | (Japan) Takafumi Morita | def. | (Japan) Hirokatsu Miyagi | Decision (Unanimous) | 3 | 3:00 | Miyagi was deducted one point for illegal clinching. |
| Catchweight 54 kg | (Japan) Kyosuke | def. | (Japan) Tsubasa | KO (Referee stoppage) | 2 | 0:30 | |
| Featherweight 57.5 kg | (Japan) Kenshin Yamamoto | def. | (Japan) Kaito Tsuzuki | KO (Referee stoppage) | 2 | 2:47 | |
| Flyweight 51.50 kg | (Japan) Tenshi Matsumoto | def. | (Japan) Koujiro | Decision (Unanimous) | 3 | 3:00 | |
| Featherweight 57.5 kg | (Japan) Shun Shiraishi | def. | (Japan) Reito | KO (Right cross) | 2 | 2:19 | |

== Rise eldorado 2022 ==
RISE ELDORADO 2022
- Promotion: RISE
- Date: April 2, 2022
- Venue: Yoyogi National Gymnasium
- City: Tokyo, Japan

RISE ELDORADO 2022 was a kickboxing event held by RISE on April 2, 2022, at the Yoyogi National Gymnasium in Tokyo, Japan.

=== Fight Card ===
RISE ELDORADO 2022
| Weight | | | | Method | Round | Time | Notes |
|---|---|---|---|---|---|---|---|
| Bantamweight 55 kg | (Japan) Tenshin Nasukawa | def. | (Japan) Kazane | Decision (Majority) | 3 | 3:00 | |
| Lightweight 63 kg | (Japan) Kento Haraguchi | def. | (Thailand) Lompet Y'ZD | TKO (3 Knockdowns) | 1 | 1:56 | |
| Bantamweight 55 kg | (Japan) Masahiko Suzuki | def. | (Japan) Mutsuki Ebata | Decision (Unanimous) | 3 | 3:00 | |
| Catchweight 56 kg | (Japan) Shiro | def. | (Japan) Rui Ebata | KO (High kick) | 2 | 1:39 | |
| Catchweight 71.5 kg | (Japan) Kaito | def. | (Japan) BeyNoah | KO (Left hook) | 1 | 0:41 | |
| Super Lightweight 65 kg | (Japan) Kosei Yamada | def. | (Japan) Naoki Tanaka | TKO (Referee stoppage) | 3 | 0:24 | |
| Lightweight 63 kg | (Japan) Taiju Shiratori | def. | (Japan) Hideki | Ext.R Decision (Unanimous) | 4 | 3:00 | |
| Catchweight 64 kg | (Japan) YA-MAN | def. | (Japan) Sumiya Ito | TKO (3 Knockdowns) | 1 | 2:33 | Open finger gloves match |
| Lightweight 63 kg | (Japan) Kan Nakamura | def. | (Japan) Tomohiro Kitai | TKO (Referee stoppage) | 1 | 2:13 | |
| Heavyweight | (Brazil) Cally Gibrainn | def. | (Japan) Kenta Nanbara | TKO (3 Knockdowns) | 1 | 2:06 | |
| Super Featherweight 60 kg | (Japan) Hyuma Hitachi | def. | (Japan) Yusaku Ishizuki | TKO (3 Knockdowns) | 1 | 2:59 | |
| Super Flyweight 53 kg | (Japan) Ryujin Nasukawa | def. | (Japan) Naoki Kasahara | Decision (Unanimous) | 3 | 3:00 | |
Preliminary card
| Bantamweight 55 kg | (Japan) Yosuke | def. | (Japan) Tomoya Fukui | TKO (Referee stoppage) | 2 | 2:35 | |
| Super Flyweight 53 kg | (Japan) Hyuga | def. | (Japan) Guriko Sato | TKO (Referee stoppage) | 1 | 2:58 | |
| Super Featherweight 60 kg | (Japan) Ryunosuke Hosokoshi | def. | (Japan) Rannosuke | Decision (Unanimous) | 3 | 3:00 | |
| Featherweight 57.5 kg | (Japan) Yuto Nomura | def. | (Japan) Shinnosuke Nagamatsu | TKO (Referee stoppage) | 3 | 0:35 | |

== RISE 157 ==
RISE 157
- Promotion: RISE
- Date: April 24, 2022
- Venue: Korakuen Hall
- City: Tokyo, Japan

RISE 157 was a kickboxing event held by RISE on April 24, 2022, at the Korakuen Hall in Tokyo, Japan.

=== Fight Card ===
RISE 157
| Weight | | | | Method | Round | Time | Notes |
|---|---|---|---|---|---|---|---|
| Flyweight 51.5 kg | (Japan) Toki Tamaru | vs. | (Japan) Ryuta Suekuni | No Contest (Head clash) | 1 | | inaugural RISE Flyweight Championship Tournament Semifinal |
| Flyweight 51.5 kg | (Japan) Riku Kazushima | def. | (Japan) Momu Tsukamoto | Decision (Majority) | 3 | 3:00 | inaugural RISE Flyweight Championship Tournament Semifinal |
| Mini Flyweight 49 kg | (Japan) Akari | def. | (Japan) Wakana Miyazaki | Decision (Majority) | 3 | 3:00 | RISE Women's Mini Flyweight Championship Tournament Semifinal |
| Mini Flyweight 49 kg | (Japan) Erika | def. | (Japan) Moe Okura | KO (Referee stoppage) | 2 | 2:42 | RISE Women's Mini Flyweight Championship Tournament Semifinal |
Hinata Terayama retirement ceremony
| Bantamweight 55 kg | (Japan) Ryunosuke Omori | def. | (Japan) Rasta | TKO (Corner stoppage) | 2 | 0:38 | |
| Super Featherweight 60 kg | (Japan) Masaaki Ono | def. | (Japan) SEIDO | Decision (Split) | 3 | 3:00 | |
| Featherweight 57.5 kg | (Japan) Taiki Sawatani | def. | (Japan) Daiki Toita | Decision (Unanimous) | 3 | 3:00 | |
| Flyweight 51.5 kg | (Japan) KING Tsubasa | def. | (Japan) Yuzuki Sakai | Decision (Majority) | 3 | 3:00 | |
| Minimumweight 49 kg | (Japan) Eriko | def. | (Japan) Otoha Nagao | Decision (Unanimous) | 3 | 3:00 | |
| W.Flyweight 52 kg | (Japan) Tomomi Yamamoto | def. | (Japan) EMI NFCNagao | Decision (Unanimous) | 3 | 3:00 | |

== RISE 158 ==
RISE 158
- Promotion: RISE
- Date: April 24, 2022
- Venue: Korakuen Hall
- City: Tokyo, Japan

RISE 158 was a kickboxing event held by RISE on May 29, 2022, at the Korakuen Hall in Tokyo, Japan.

=== Fight Card ===
RISE 158
| Weight | | | | Method | Round | Time | Notes |
|---|---|---|---|---|---|---|---|
| Welterrweight 67.5 kg | (Japan) Ryota Nakano | def. | (Japan) Ryoya Inai | TKO (Referee stoppage) | 2 | 1:39 | For the vacant RISE Welterweight (-67.5kg) title |
| Flyweight 51.5 kg | (Japan) Koyuki Miyazaki (c) | def. | (Japan) Arina Kobayashi | Decision (Unanimous) | 5 | 3:00 | For the RISE Queen Atomweight (-46kg) title |
| Middleweight 70 kg | (Japan) YUYA | def. | (Japan) J | TKO (3 Knockdowns) | 2 | 0:52 | |
| Lightweight 70 kg | (Japan) Sota Kimura | def. | (Japan) Yutaro Asahi | Decision (Unanimous) | 3 | 3:00 | |
| Super Lightweight 65 kg | (Japan) Chappy Yoshinuma | def. | (Japan) Tatsuya Inaishi | Decision (Unanimous) | 3 | 3:00 | |
| Featherweight 57.5 kg | (Japan) Taiki Matsui | def. | (Japan) Hayato | Decision (Unanimous) | 3 | 3:00 | |
| Featherweight 57.5 kg | (Japan) Naofumi Yamashina | def. | (Japan) Ryu Matsunaga | TKO (Referee stoppage) | 3 | 2:01 | |
| Bantamweight 55 kg | (Japan) Ryoya ito | def. | (Japan) Raize | TKO (Referee stoppage) | 3 | 1:40 | |
| Flyweight 51.5 kg | (Japan) Ryoma Hirayama | def. | (Japan) Shuri Sakayori | Decision (Unanimous) | 3 | 3:00 | |
| Catchweight 44 kg | (Japan) Ayaka Nishiura | def. | (Japan) Fuu | Decision (Unanimous) | 3 | 3:00 | |

== THE MATCH 2022 ==
The Match 2022
- Promotion: Rizin Fighting Federation; K-1; RISE
- Date: June 19, 2022
- Venue: Tokyo Dome
- City: Tokyo, Japan

THE MATCH 2022 was a kickboxing event held as a partnership between K-1 and RISE, and produced in-association with the Rizin Fighting Federation, on June 19, 2022, in Tokyo, Japan.

=== Background ===
The main event featured the RISE Featherweight champion Tenshin Nasukawa in a non-title crossover fight with K-1 Super Featherweight champion Takeru Segawa.

=== Fight Card ===
The Match 2022
| Weight Class | | | | Method | Round | T.Time |
|---|---|---|---|---|---|---|
| Catchweight 58 kg | (Japan) Tenshin Nasukawa | def. | (Japan) Takeru | Decision (Unanimous) | 3 | 3:00 |
| Catchweight 68.5 kg | (Japan) Kaito Ono | def. | (Japan) Masaaki Noiri | Ext R. Decision (Unanimous) | 4 | 3:00 |
| Super lightweight 65 kg | (Japan) Kento Haraguchi | def. | (Japan) Hideaki Yamazaki | TKO (Ref Stoppage) | 2 | 0:33 |
| Super lightweight 65 kg | (Japan) Rukiya Anpo | def. | (Japan) Kosei Yamada | Decision (Unanimous) | 3 | 3:00 |
| Lightweight 63 kg | (Thailand) Kongnapa Weerasakreck | def. | (Japan) Taiju Shiratori | TKO (Punch) | 1 | 2:42 |
| Catchweight 62 kg | (Japan) Kan Nakamura | def. | (Japan) Leona Pettas | Decision (Majority) | 3 | 3:00 |
| Catchweight 62 kg | (Japan) YA-MAN | def. | (Japan) Ryusei Ashizawa | KO (punch) | 1 | 1:49 |
| Catchweight 71 kg | (Japan) Hiromi Wajima | def. | (Japan) BeyNoah | Decision (Unanimous) | 3 | 3:00 |
| Catchweight 100 kg | (Iran) Sina Karimian | def. | (Japan) Rikiya Yamashita | Decision (Unanimous) | 3 | 3:00 |
| Catchweight 100 kg | (Iran) Mahmoud Sattari | def. | (Japan) Yuta Uchida | KO (punch) | 1 | |
| Super featherweight 60 kg | (Japan) Yuki Kasahara | def. | (Japan) Chihiro Nakajima | Decision (Unanimous) | 3 | 3:00 |
| Bantamweight 53 kg | (Japan) Kazane Nagai | def. | (Japan) Toma Kuroda | Ext R. Decision (Unanimous) | 4 | 3:00 |
| Super bantamweight 55 kg | (Japan) Mutsuki Ebata | def. | (Japan) Riamu | Ext R. Decision (Split) | 4 | 3:00 |
| Super bantamweight 55 kg | (Japan) Masashi Kumura | def. | (Japan) Shiro | Decision (Unanimous) | 3 | 3:00 |
| Super bantamweight 55 kg | (Japan) Masahiko Suzuki | def. | (Japan) Akihiro Kaneko | Decision (Majority) | 3 | 3:00 |
| Bantamweight 53 kg | (Japan) Rui Okubo | def. | (Japan) Ryujin Nasukawa | Decision (Unanimous) | 3 | 3:00 |

== RISE 159 ==
RISE 159
- Promotion: RISE
- Date: June 24, 2022
- Venue: Korakuen Hall
- City: Tokyo, Japan

RISE 159 was a kickboxing event held by RISE on June 24, 2022, at the Korakuen Hall in Tokyo, Japan.

=== Fight Card ===
RISE 159
| Weight | | | | Method | Round | Time | Notes |
|---|---|---|---|---|---|---|---|
| Mini Flyweight 49 kg | (Japan) Erika | def. | (Japan) AKARI | Decision (Unanimous) | 5 | 3:00 | For the vacant RISE Women's Mini Flyweight title |
| Super Flyweight 53 kg | (Japan) Ryu Hanaoka | def. | (Japan) Koudai | Decision (Unanimous) | 3 | 3:00 | |
| Bantamweight 55 kg | (Japan) David Chibana | def. | (Japan) Kyosuke | KO (Left hook) | 3 | 1:54 | |
| Atomweight 46 kg | (Japan) Koto Hiraoka | def. | (Japan) Momoka | Decision (Unanimous) | 3 | 3:00 | |
| Super Lightweight 65 kg | (Japan) Masa Sato | def. | (Japan) Kazuma Mori | TKO (3 Knockdowns) | 3 | 1:18 | |
| Lightweight 63 kg | (Japan) Ruka | def. | (Japan) YU-YA | TKO (Referee stoppage) | 2 | 1:00 | Open finger gloves match |
| Super Flyweight 53 kg | (Japan) Azusa Kaneko | def. | (Japan) Guriko Sato | TKO (3 Knockdowns) | 3 | 1:59 | |
| Bantamweight 55 kg | (Japan) Naoya Otada | def. | (Japan) Kazushi Sagara | Decision (Unanimous) | 3 | 3:00 | |
| Featherweight 57.5 kg | (Japan) Shintaro | def. | (Japan) Naoki Sakamoto | Decision (Unanimous) | 3 | 3:00 | |

== RISE 160 ==
RISE 160
- Promotion: RISE
- Date: July 29, 2022
- Venue: Korakuen Hall
- City: Tokyo, Japan

RISE 160 was a kickboxing event held by RISE on July 29, 2022, at the Korakuen Hall in Tokyo, Japan.

=== Fight Card ===
RISE 160
| Weight | | | | Method | Round | Time | Notes |
|---|---|---|---|---|---|---|---|
| Super Featherweight 60 kg | (South Korea) Chan Hyung Lee (c) | def. | (Japan) Kazuma | TKO (3 Knockdowns) | 4 | 2:54 | For the RISE Super Featherweight (-60kg) title |
| W.Flyweight 52 kg | (Japan) Manazo Kobayashi | def. | (South Korea) Do Kyung Lee | Decision (Unanimous) | 3 | 3:00 | |
| Featherweight 57.5 kg | (Japan) Haruto Yasumoto | vs. | (Iran) Mehrdad Sayyadi | No contest (overturned) | | | TKO win for Yasumoto, overturned to a NC after review due to an illegal elbow strike leading to the stoppage. |
| Heavyweight | (Brazil) Callyu Gibrainn | def. | (Japan) MAX Yoshida | Decision (Unanimous) | 3 | 3:00 | |
| Catchweight 56 kg | (Japan) Koki Osaki | def. | (Japan) Jyosei | KO (3 Knockdowns) | 1 | 1:35 | |
| Lightweight 63 kg | (Japan) KENTA | def. | (Japan) Sota Kimura | Decision (Majority) | 3 | 3:00 | |
| Super Featherweight 60 kg | (Japan) Shota Okudaira | def. | (Japan) Shigeki Fujii | Ext.R Decision (Unanimous) | 3 | 3:00 | |
| Super Flyweight 53 kg | (Japan) Tsubasa | def. | (Japan) Soma Tameda | TKO (Referee stoppage) | 2 | 0:31 | |
| Flyweight 51.5 kg | (Japan) Tenshi Matsumoto | def. | (Japan) Yuzuki Sakai | Ext.R Decision (Unanimous) | 3 | 3:00 | |
| Catchweight 62.5 kg | (Japan) Yuki Morishita | def. | (Japan) Yuki Tanaka | TKO (Referee stoppage) | 1 | 1:03 | |
| Super Flyweight 53 kg | (Japan) Takumi Hoshi | def. | (Japan) Shohei Ono | Decision (Unanimous) | 3 | 3:00 | |

== Rise world series Osaka 2022 ==
RISE WORLD SERIES OSAKA 2022
- Promotion: RISE
- Date: August 21, 2022
- Venue: EDION Arena Osaka
- City: Osaka, Japan

RISE WORLD SERIES OSAKA 2022 was a kickboxing event held by RISE on August 21, 2022, at the EDION Arena Osaka in Osaka, Japan.

=== Background ===
The event was headlined by a Super Lightweight bout between reigning Glory Featherweight champion Petpanomrung Kiatmuu9 and Kento Haraguchi for the inaugural RISE Super Lightweight (-65kg) World title.

=== Fight card ===
RISE WORLD SERIES 2022
| Weight | | | | Method | Round | Time | Notes |
|---|---|---|---|---|---|---|---|
| Super Lightweight 65 kg | (Thailand) Petpanomrung Kiatmuu9 | def. | (Japan) Kento Haraguchi | Ext.R Decision (Unanimous) | 6 | 3:00 | For the inaugural RISE Super Lightweight (-65kg) World title |
| Middleweight 70 kg | (Japan) Kaito | def. | (Slovenia) Samo Petje | Ext.R Decision (Unanimous) | 4 | 3:00 | |
| Super Lightweight 65 kg | (Australia) Chadd Collins | def. | (Japan) Ryota Nakano | KO (Right hook) | 1 | 2:43 | |
| Super Lightweight 65 kg | (Japan) Kosei Yamada | def. | (Netherlands) Jan Kaffa | KO (Right hook) | 3 | 1:23 | |
| Bantamweight 55 kg | (Japan) Masahiko Suzuki | def. | (Japan) Seiki Ueyama | Ext.R Decision (Unanimous) | 4 | 3:00 | |
| Super Flyweight 53 kg | (Japan) Kazuki Osaki | def. | (Thailand) Sanchai TeppenGym | KO (Left hook) | 3 | 1:45 | |
| Catchweight 66 kg | (Thailand) Tapruwan Hadesworkout | def. | (Japan) Hiroto Yamaguchi | TKO (Punches) | 3 | 1:45 | Open finger gloves match |
| Lightweight 63 kg | (Japan) Yuma Yamaguchi | def. | (Japan) Sumiya Ito | Decision (Majority) | 3 | 3:00 | Open finger gloves match |
| Middleweight 70 kg | (Japan) Masaya Jaki | def. | (Japan) Shoji Hagimoto | Decision (Split) | 3 | 3:00 | Open finger gloves match |
| Bantamweight 55 kg | (Japan) Ryunosuke Omori | def. | (Japan) Yuki Kyotani | KO (Knee to the body) | 2 | 1:39 | |
| Middleweight 70 kg | (Japan) YUYA | def. | (Japan) Masashi Yamato | TKO (3 Knockdowns) | 1 | 1:54 | |
| Middleweight 70 kg | (Japan) T-98 | def. | (Japan) Ryotaro | Ext.R KO | 4 | 0:09 | |
| Flyweight 51.5 kg | (Japan) Riku Kazushima | def. | (Japan) Yoshiki Tane | KO (Left hook) | 1 | 1:17 | |
| Lightweight 63 kg | (Japan) Yuma Yamahata | def. | (Japan) Motoki | Decision (Unanimous) | 3 | 3:00 | |
| Cruiserweight 90 kg | (Brazil) Carlos Budiao | def. | (Philippines) Anh Jess | KO (Body kick) | 2 | 1:59 | |
| Bantamweight 55 kg | (Japan) Yugo Kato | def. | (Japan) Shoma | Decision (Unanimous) | 3 | 3:00 | |
| Flyweight 51.5 kg | (Japan) Momu Tsukamoto | def. | (Japan) KING Tsubasa | Decision (Unanimous) | 3 | 3:00 | |

== RISE 161 ==
RISE 161
- Promotion: RISE
- Date: August 28, 2022
- Venue: Korakuen Hall
- City: Tokyo, Japan

RISE 161 was a kickboxing event held by RISE on August 28, 2022, at the Korakuen Hall in Tokyo, Japan.

=== Fight Card ===
RISE 161
| Weight | | | | Method | Round | Time | Notes |
|---|---|---|---|---|---|---|---|
| Featherweight 57.5 kg | (Japan) Keisuke Monguchi | def. | (Japan) Taisei Umei (c) | Decision (Unanimous) | 5 | 3:00 | For the RISE Featherweight (-57.5kg) title |
| Middleweight 70 kg | (South Korea) Lee Sung-hyun | draw. | (Japan) Tsukuru Midorikawa | Ext.R Decision (Majority) | 4 | 3:00 | |
| Super Flyweight 53 kg | (Japan) Ryu Hanaoka | def. | (Japan) Jin Mandokoro | Decision (Doctor stoppage) | 3 | 0:21 | |
| Welterweight 67.5 kg | (Japan) Masashi Nakajima | def. | (Japan) Takumi Sanekata | Decision (Unanimous) | 3 | 3:00 | |
| Middleweight 70 kg | (Japan) Kiyoteru Suzuki | def. | (Japan) Negimajin | TKO (Referee stoppage) | 2 | 1:48 | |
| Catchweight 85 kg | (Japan) Kenta Nanbara | def. | (Thailand) Jet Petchmanee Eagle | TKO (Referee stoppage) | 2 | 2:59 | |
| Flyweight 51.5 kg | (Japan) Ryujin Nasukawa | def. | (Japan) Ryoma Hirayama | TKO (Referee stoppage) | 3 | 1:38 | |
| Lightweight 63 kg | (Japan) Chiharu Higuchi | def. | (Japan) Yusei Nakamoto | TKO (Referee stoppage) | 3 | 0:55 | |
| Heavyweight | (Japan) Miyagin | def. | (Japan) Koh Harigaya | TKO (Right hook) | 1 | 2:46 | |
| Featherweight 57.5 kg | (Japan) Shun Shiraishi | def. | (Japan) Hayato | Decision (Majority) | 3 | 3:00 | |
| Flyweight 51.5 kg | (Japan) Novo | def. | (Japan) Dangan Futa | TKO (Referee stoppage) | 3 | 1:23 | |

== Rise world series 2022 ==
RISE WORLD SERIES 2022
- Promotion: RISE
- Date: October 15, 2022
- Venue: Ota City General Gymnasium
- City: Tokyo, Japan

RISE WORLD SERIES 2022 was a kickboxing event held by RISE on October 15, 2022, at the Ota City General Gymnasium in Tokyo, Japan.

=== Background ===
The event was headlined by a super flyweight title bout between RISE champion Kazuki Osaki and the 2021 RISE -53 kg Dead or Alive Tournament winner Kazane.

=== Fight Card ===
RISE WORLD SERIES 2022
| Weight | | | | Method | Round | Time | Notes |
|---|---|---|---|---|---|---|---|
| Super Flyweight 53 kg | (Japan) Kazuki Osaki (c) | def. | (Japan) Kazane | Decision (Majority) | 5 | 3:00 | For the RISE Super Flyweight (-53 kg) title |
| Super Lightweight 65 kg | (Japan) Taiju Shiratori | def. | (Japan) YA-MAN | Decision (Unanimous) | 3 | 3:00 | |
| Catchweight 62.5 kg | (South Korea) Chan Hyung Lee | def. | (Japan) Kan Nakamura | TKO (Punches) | 2 | 1:39 | |
| Catchweight 64 kg | (Australia) Chadd Collins | def. | (Japan) Naoki | KO (Left hook) | 2 | 2:42 | |
| W.Atomweight 46 kg | (Japan) Koyuki Miyazaki | def. | (Thailand) Petlookaon Sarigym | Decision (Unanimous) | 3 | 3:00 | |
| Bantamweight 55 kg | (Japan) Shiro | def. | (Japan) Koki Osaki | Ext.R Decision (Unanimous) | 4 | 3:00 | |
| Featherweight 57.5 kg | (Japan) Haruto Yasumoto | def. | (Japan) Kensei Yamakawa | KO (High kick) | 1 | 1:04 | |
| Super Featherweight 60 kg | (Japan) Taiga | def. | (Japan) Shota Okudaira | Ext.R Decision (Unanimous) | 4 | 3:00 | |
| Super Flyweight 53 kg | (Japan) Tsubasa | def. | (Japan) Ryu Hanaoka | Tech. Decision (Unanimous) | 2 | 2:56 | |
| Lightweight 63 kg | (Japan) Sho Ogawa | def. | (Japan) KENTA | Decision (Unanimous) | 3 | 3:00 | |
| Flyweight 51.5 kg | (Japan) Ryujin Nasukawa | def. | (Japan) Ryotaro Yoshida | Decision (Unanimous) | 3 | 3:00 | |
Preliminary card
| Super Flyweight 53 kg | (Japan) Ryunosuke Ito | def. | (Japan) Takumi Hoshi | Decision (Splt) | 3 | 3:00 | |
| Featherweight 57.5 kg | (Japan) Retsu Sashida | def. | (Japan) Shinnosuke Nagamatsu | Decision (Unanimous) | 3 | 3:00 | |

== RISE 162 ==
RISE 162
- Promotion: RISE
- Date: October 30, 2022
- Venue: Korakuen Hall
- City: Tokyo, Japan

RISE 162 was a kickboxing event held by RISE on December 10, 2022, at the Korakuen Hall in Tokyo, Japan.

=== Fight Card ===
RISE 162
| Weight | | | | Method | Round | Time | Notes |
|---|---|---|---|---|---|---|---|
| Flyweight 51.5 kg | (Japan) Toki Tamaru | def. | (Japan) Riku Kazushima | Decision (Unanimous) | 5 | 3:00 | For the inaugural RISE Flyweight title |
Nobuchika Terado retirement ceremony
| Bantamweight 55 kg | (Japan) Ryoga Terayama | def. | (Japan) Kyosuke | Decision (Unanimous) | 3 | 3:00 | |
| Bantamweight 55 kg | (Japan) Shoa Arii | def. | (Japan) Hyuga | Decision (Unanimous) | 3 | 3:00 | |
| Mini Flyweight 49 kg | (Japan) AKARI | def. | (Japan) Eriko | Decision (Unanimous) | 3 | 3:00 | |
| W.Bantamweight 55 kg | (Japan) Yuka Murakami | def. | (Japan) SEINA | Decision (Unanimous) | 3 | 3:00 | |
| Bantamweight 55 kg | (Japan) Kaito Hasegawa | vs. | (Japan) Ausa Kaneko | No contest (head clash) | 1 | | |
| Super Featherweight 60 kg | (Japan) Masaaki Ono | draw. | (Japan) Taisei Iwagoe | Ext.R Decision (Majority) | 4 | 3:00 | |
| Featherweight 57.5 kg | (Japan) Shin | def. | (Japan) Naofumi Yamashina | Disqualification (weight) | | | Yamashina missed weight by 2kg and was disqualified |
| Bantamweight 55 kg | (Japan) Naoya Otada | def. | (Japan) Tomoya Fukui | Decision (Unanimous) | 3 | 3:00 | |
| Catchweight 45 kg | (Japan) Honoka Kobayashi | def. | (Japan) Honoka Tsujii | Decision (Majority) | 3 | 3:00 | |

== RISE 163 ==
RISE 163
- Promotion: RISE
- Date: December 10, 2022
- Venue: Korakuen Hall
- City: Tokyo, Japan

RISE 163 was a kickboxing event held by RISE on December 10, 2022, at the Korakuen Hall in Tokyo, Japan.

=== Background ===
A lightweight bout between Kan Nakamura and Sumiya Ito served as the main event of the evening.

=== Fight Card ===
RISE 163
| Weight | | | | Method | Round | Time | Notes |
|---|---|---|---|---|---|---|---|
| Lightweight 63 kg | (Japan) Kan Nakamura | def. | (Japan) Sumiya Ito | KO (Left cross) | 2 | 2:22 | |
| Middleweight 70 kg | (Japan) Tsukuru Midorikawa | draw. | (Argentina) Ricardo Bravo | Ext.R Decision (Split) | 4 | 3:00 | |
| Super Flyweight 53 kg | (Japan) Jin Mandokoro | def. | (Japan) Koudai | Decision (Unanimous) | 3 | 3:00 | |
| Bantamweight 55 kg | (Japan) Yugo Kato | def. | (Japan) Ryunosuke Omori | Decision (Majority) | 3 | 3:00 | |
| Atomweight 46 kg | (Japan) Arina Kobayashi | def. | (Japan) Koto Hiraoka | Decision (Unanimous) | 3 | 3:00 | Open finger gloves bout. |
| Super Lightweight 65 kg | (Japan) Yutaro Asahi | def. | (Japan) Tomohiro Kitai | Decision (Unanimous) | 3 | 3:00 | |
| Featherweight 57.5 kg | (Japan) Ryoga Hirano | def. | (Japan) Taiki Sawatani | Decision (Unanimous) | 3 | 3:00 | |
| Featherweight 57.5 kg | (Japan) Daiki Toita | def. | (Japan) Kazuhiro Matsuyama | TKO (3 Knockdowns) | 1 | 2:37 | |
| Lightweight 63 kg | (Japan) Kanta Motoyama | def. | (Japan) Chiharu Higuchi | Decision (Unanimous) | 3 | 3:00 | |
| Featherweight 57.5 kg | (Japan) Kenshin Yamamoto | def. | (Japan) Shun Shiraishi | KO (Right cross) | 1 | 2:20 | |
| Welterweight 67.5 kg | (Japan) Ichiyo Morimoto | def. | (Japan) Strong Kobayashi | KO (Left hook) | 3 | 1:50 | |
| Flyweight 51.5 kg | (Japan) Tenshi Matsumoto | def. | (Japan) Novo | KO (Left cross) | 2 | 0:27 | |

== Rise world series / Shootboxing-kings 2022 ==
Glory Rivals 4
- Promotion: Glory; RISE; Shoot boxing
- Date: December 25, 2022
- Venue: Ryōgoku Kokugikan
- City: Tokyo, Japan

RISE WORLD SERIES / SHOOTBOXING-KINGS 2022 was a kickboxing event held by RISE in partnership with GLORY and Shoot boxing on December 25, 2022, at the Ryōgoku Kokugikan in Tokyo, Japan.

=== Background ===
The event was headlined by a featherweight bout between former RISE lightweight champion Kento Haraguchi and the former Glory featherweight champion Serhiy Adamchuk.

=== Fight Card ===
Glory Rivals 4
| Weight | | | | Method | Round | Time | Notes |
|---|---|---|---|---|---|---|---|
| Featherweight 65 kg | (Japan) Kento Haraguchi | def. | (Ukraine) Serhiy Adamchuk | Decision (Unanimous) | 3 | 3:00 | |
| Lightweight 70 kg | (Japan) Kaito | def. | (Bulgaria) Stoyan Koprivlenski | Decision (Split) | 3 | 3:00 | |
| Featherweight 65 kg | (Thailand) Petpanomrung Kiatmuu9 | def. | (Japan) Kosei Yamada | Decision (Unanimous) | 3 | 3:00 | |
| Featherweight 65 kg | (Japan) Taiju Shiratori | def. | (Morocco) Ilias Banniss | Decision (Unanimous) | 3 | 3:00 | |
| Catchweight 63.5 kg | (Australia) Chadd Collins | def. | (Japan) Hiroki Kasahara | Decision (Unanimous) | 3 | 3:00 | |
| W.Strawweight 52 kg | (Netherlands) Tessa de Kom | def. | (Japan) Manazo Kobayashi | Decision (Unanimous) | 3 | 3:00 | |
RISE World Series / SHOOTBOXING-Kings 2022
| Catchweight 55 kg | (Japan) Shiro | def. | (Japan) Masahiko Suzuki | Decision (Majority) | 3 | 3:00 | |
| Catchweight 61 kg | (Japan) Yuki Kasahara | def. | (Japan) Yusaku Ishizuki | Decision (Unanimous) | 3 | 3:00 | |
| Catchweight 46 kg | (Japan) Koyuki Miyazaki | def. | (Japan) Misaki | Decision (Majority) | 3 | 3:00 | |
| Catchweight 55 kg | (Japan) Koki Osaki | def. | (Japan) Seiki Ueyama | Decision (Unanimous) | 3 | 3:00 | SHOOTBOXING Rules. Ueyama missed weight by 1.5 kg. He was deducted 2 points and had to wear bigger gloves. |
| Catchweight 57.5 kg | (Japan) Kyo Kawakami | def. | (Japan) Haruto Yasumoto | Ext.R Decision (Majority) | 4 | 3:00 | SHOOTBOXING Rules |
| Catchweight 57.5 kg | (Japan) Keisuke Monguchi | def. | (Japan) Kotaro Yamada | Decision (Unanimous) | 3 | 3:00 | SHOOTBOXING Rules |
| Light Heavyweight 95 kg | (Japan) Kenta Nanbara | def. | (Japan) Yuki Sakamoto | TKO (Doctor stoppage) | 3 | 1:02 | SHOOTBOXING Rules |
| Catchweight 53 kg | (Japan) Shuto Sato | def. | (Japan) Tsubasa Kaneko | TKO (3 Knockdowns) | 1 | | SHOOTBOXING Rules |
| Catchweight 55 kg | (Japan) Koyata Yamada | def. | (Japan) Shoa Arii | KO (Right cross) | 2 | 1:21 | |
| Lightweight 70 kg | (Japan) YUYA | def. | (Japan) T-98 | TKO (Punches) | 2 | 1:12 | |
| Catchweight 51.5 kg | (Japan) Ryujin Nasukawa | def. | (Japan) Koujiro | Decision (Majority) | 3 | 3:00 | |
Preliminary card
| Featherweight 65 kg | (Japan) Hyu | def. | (Japan) Hiroshi Noguchi | Decision (Unanimous) | 3 | 3:00 | |
| Catchweight 63 kg | (Japan) Ryuto Shiokawa | def. | (Japan) Soma Higashi | Decision (Unanimous) | 3 | 3:00 | |
| Catchweight 53 kg | (Japan) Takumi Hoshi | def. | (Japan) Naoki Kasahara | Decision (Unanimous) | 3 | 3:00 | SHOOTBOXING Rules |

== See also ==
- 2022 in K-1
- 2022 in ONE Championship
- 2022 in Romanian kickboxing
- 2022 in Wu Lin Feng
