= Kenta Nanbara =

Japanese karateka and kickboxer (born 1998)

- Born: May 2, 1998 (age 28); Itabashi, Tokyo, Japan
- Native name: 南原 健太
- Height: 1.86 m (6 ft 1 in)
- Weight: 85 kg (187 lb; 13.4 st)
- Division: Light heavyweight
- Style: Kyokushin
- Stance: Orthodox
- Fighting out of: Tokyo, Japan
- Team: Target Shibuya
- Years active: 2021–present

Kickboxing record
- Total: 15
- Wins: 14
- By knockout: 12
- Losses: 1
- By knockout: 1

Other information
- Website: https://kenta-nambara.com/

Kenta Nanbara (Japanese: 南原 健太; born May 2, 1998) is a Japanese Kyokushin karateka and light heavyweight kickboxer. He is the reigning ISKA K-1 World Light Cruiserweight champion and the Light Heavyweight champion. As a karateka, he is a silver medalist in the team competition at the World Kyokushin Karate Championships and the Japanese championship.

== Karate career ==
Nanbara competed at the 2008 World Junior Championships, where he faced Tenshin Nasukawa.

Nanbara finished third at the 2015 Japan Championships in the super heavyweight division, defeating Ryoma Yamakawa in the third place match. In July 2015, he won silver at the World Championships team event, where Nanbara competed in the youth kumite division. He also competed in the three-day World Championships in November, where Nanbara advanced to the top 32. He lost in the first round of the final day to Yaroslav Stanislavenko after a tiebreaker by judges' vote. Nanbara was awarded the tournament's best young fighter.

He finished seventh in the 2017 Japan Open Championship.

Nanbara won silver at the 2018 Japan Championships in the super heavyweight division after losing to Anton Gulyaev in the final.

In June 2022, Nanbara competed in the Japan Championships, advancing to the heavyweight finals, where he defeated Kanta Tokuda.

== Kickboxing career ==
Nanbara switched to kickboxing after signing with RISE. He made his promotional debut and faced Yumi Sano on July 28, 2021, at RISE 151. He won the bout by knockout in the third round.

Nanbara faced Kwan Sakrangsit on October 22, 2021, at Rise 152. He won the bout at the end of the second round after his opponent's cornerman threw in the towel to signal his submission.

Nanbara faced Kontualai JMBoxinggym for the vacant RISE Light Heavyweight championship, in the RISE Light Heavyweight Tournament finals on August 18, 2023, at RISE 171. He won the bout by knockout in the second round to win the tournament and vacant title.

Nanbara faced Victor de Koning on December 16, 2023, at RISE World Series 2023 - Final Round. He won the bout by knockout, after an extra fourth round was contested.

== Championships and accomplishments ==
=== Kickboxing ===
- RISE
  - 2023 RISE Light Heavyweight (-90kg) Championship
    - One successful title defense
  - 2023 RISE Fight of the Year (vs. Kongtualai JMBoxing)
- International Sport Kickboxing Association
  - 2026 ISKA K-1 World Light Cruiserweight (-85kg) Championship

=== Karate ===
- IKO Kyokushinkaikan
  - 6x IKO International Karate Friendship Championships Winner (2007, 2009, 2010, 2011, 2014, 2015)
  - 2012 IKO All Japan Junior Championships (U-13) Winner
  - 2013 IKO All Japan Junior Championships (U-14) Winner
  - 2014 IKO All Japan Junior Championships (U-15) Winner
  - 2014 IKO International Youth Championships (U-15) Winner
  - 2015 IKO World Youth Elite Championships (U-17) Winner
  - 2015 IKO All Japan Weight Championships Super Heavyweight 3rd place
  - 2018 IKO All Japan Weight Championships Super Heavyweight Runner-up
  - 2022 IKO All Japan Weight Championships Heavyweight (-90 kg) Winner

== Kickboxing record ==
Professional Kickboxing record
14 Wins (12 (T)KOs), 1 Loss, 0 Draw
| Date | Result | Opponent | Event | Location | Method | Round | Time |
| 2026-10-25 | Win | (Greece) Vangelis Tzorzis | GOAT Kickboxing Fes. 3 | Tokyo, Japan | KO (Right hook) | 3 | 2:16 |
Won the ISKA K-1 World Light Cruiserweight (-85kg) Championship.
| 2026-08-29 | Win | (Democratic Republic of the Congo) Gunther Kalunda | RISE 201 | Tokyo, Japan | KO (Right overhand) | 3 | 1:39 |
Defended the RISE Light Heavyweight (-90kg) Championship.
| 2025-11-02 | Win | (France) Frangis Goma | RISE World Series 2025 Final | Tokyo, Japan | Decision (Unanimous) | 3 | 3:00 |
| 2025-07-25 | Win | (South Korea) Seong Jik Jeong | RISE 190 | Tokyo, Japan | Ext.R Decision (Unanimous) | 4 | 3:00 |
| 2024-06-15 | Win | (Australia) Jesse Astill | RISE WORLD SERIES 2024 Osaka | Osaka, Japan | KO (Body kick) | 3 | 0:58 |
| 2023-12-16 | Win | (Netherlands) Victor de Koning | RISE WORLD SERIES 2023 - Final Round | Tokyo, Japan | Ext.R KO (Punches) | 4 | 1:01 |
| 2023-08-18 | Win | (Thailand) Kontualai JMBoxingGym | RISE 171 | Tokyo, Japan | KO (Right hook) | 2 | 1:32 |
Won the vacant RISE Light Heavyweight (-90kg) Championship.
| 2023-06-23 | Win | (Japan) Kazuki Irita | RISE 169 | Tokyo, Japan | TKO (Punches) | 2 | 1:38 |
| 2023-03-26 | Win | (Japan) Ryo Aitaka | RISE ELDORADO 2023 | Tokyo, Japan | KO (Knee to the head) | 1 | 2:57 |
| 2022-12-25 | Win | (Japan) Yuki Sakamoto | RISE WORLD SERIES / Glory Rivals 4 | Tokyo, Japan | TKO (Doctor stoppage) | 3 | 1:02 |
| 2022-08-28 | Win | (Thailand) Jet Petchmanee Eagle | RISE 161 | Tokyo, Japan | TKO (Referee stoppage) | 2 | 2:59 |
| 2022-04-02 | Loss | (Brazil) Cally Gibrainn | RISE ELDORADO 2022 | Tokyo, Japan | TKO (3 Knockdowns) | 1 | 2:06 |
| 2022-01-23 | Win | (Japan) Miyagin | RISE 154 | Tokyo, Japan | KO (Left high kick) | 1 | 1:04 |
| 2021-10-22 | Win | (Thailand) Kwan Sakrangsit | RISE 152 | Tokyo, Japan | TKO (Corner stoppage) | 2 | 0:39 |
| 2021-07-28 | Win | (Japan) Isami Sano | RISE 151 | Tokyo, Japan | KO (Right cross) | 3 | 2:20 |
Legend: Win Loss Draw/No contest Notes

== See also ==
- List of male kickboxers
