= Mio Tsumura =

Japanese kickboxer (born 1995)

MIO
- Born: Mio Tsumura 津村澪; April 14, 1995 (age 31); Osaka, Japan
- Other names: MIO
- Height: 153 cm (5 ft 0 in)
- Weight: 48.0 kg (105.8 lb; 7.56 st)
- Division: Mini Flyweight
- Style: Shootboxing
- Stance: Orthodox
- Fighting out of: Tokyo, Japan
- Team: K-1 Gym KREST; Oikawa Dojo (former)
- Years active: 2011 – present

Kickboxing record
- Total: 47
- Wins: 40
- By knockout: 4
- Losses: 7

Mio Tsumura (born 14 April 1995), popularly known as MIO, is a Japanese kickboxer, currently competing in the atomweight division of K-1.

A professional competitor since 2011, she is a multiple-time Shootboxing tournament winner, having won the Joshikousei tournament in 2012 and 2013, the Girls S-Cup Japan tournament in 2015 and the Asia Tournament in 2016. Tsumura is also the former Shootboxing Japan Minimumweight Champion.

== Kickboxing career ==
=== Shootboxing ===
==== Shoot Boxing Joshikousei tournaments ====
Tsumura was scheduled to make her professional debut against Yoko Yamada on September 10, 2011. She won her debut by a first-round disqualification. She won her next two fights against Mariko Akechi and Asuka Inoue by unanimous decision, and her fourth professional fight against Tsubaki Oshima by majority decision.

Tsumura took part in the 2012 Joshikousei Shoot Boxing Girls S-Cup, which was open solely to highschool age competitors. She beat Yuuki Kira in the quarterfinals and Tachiyuki in the semifinals by unanimous decision, before facing Eneos Akari in the finals. She beat Akari by a second-round technical knockout.

After losing a majority decision to Momi at Shoot Boxing 2013 act.1, Tsumura was scheduled to participate in the 2013 edition of the Shoot Boxing Joshikousei tournament. She beat Fuuka Yoshino and COMACHI by unanimous decision, to earn her place in the finals against Kira☆Yuuki. Tsumura beat Yuki by a first-round knockout.

==== Shootboxing Japan tournaments ====
Tsumura was scheduled to fight Kira☆Chihiro at Shoot Boxing 2013. She won the fight by a majority decision. Tsumura was scheduled to fight Eneos Akari at Shoot Boxing 2014 act.1. She beat Akari by unanimous decision.

Tsumura was scheduled to fight a rematch with Momi in the semifinals of the 2014 Shoot Boxing Girls S-Cup Japan tournament. She won the rematch with Momi by unanimous decision, but lost the final bout against Yukari Yamaguchi by an extra round split decision.

Tsumura fought Hana DATE at Shoot Boxing 2014 act.4, and won the bout by unanimous decision. Tsumura was scheduled to fight Kai Ting Chuang at Onna Matsuri 2015: ~J-Girls x Shoot Boxing~. She won the fight by unanimous decision.

It was announced that Tsumura would take part in the 2015 Shootboxing Japan S-Girls Cup, being scheduled to fight Emi Matsushita in the quarterfinals. She beat Matsushita in the quarterfinals by unanimous decision and Mei Yamaguchi in the semifinals by an extra round decision, before fighting a trilogy match with Momi in the finals. Tsumura won her third match against Momi by an extra round decision.

==== Shootboxing Asia tournament ====
Tsumura fought MARI at Shoot Boxing The Last Bomb, and won the fight by unanimous decision. This was followed by a unanimous decision win against MISAKI at Shoot Boxing Young Caesar Cup act.2.

Tsumura participated in the 2016 Shoot Boxing Girls S-Cup Asia Tournament, and faced Yurika GSB in the semifinals. She beat Yurika by unanimous decision in the semifinals and Union Akari by an extra round majority decision in the finals.

Tsumura was scheduled to fight Renju DATE at Shoot Boxing 2016 act.4. She won the fight by a first-round technical knockout. She extended her winning streak to twelve fights in a row with a unanimous decision victory against Mei Umeo at Shoot Boxing Young Caesar Cup act.4.

==== Shootboxing Japan Minimumweight champion ====
Tsumura was scheduled to fight a rematch with Union Akari for the Shoot Boxing Japan Minimumweight title, at SHOOT BOXING World Tournament S-Cup 2016. She won the fight by an extra round decision.

After winning the Shootboxing title, Tsumura fought five non-title bouts, winning all five of them. She first beat Hoi Ling Kwok by unanimous decision at SHOOT BOXING 2017 act.1, Vicky Tan by a second-round technical knockout at SHOOT BOXING 2017 act.2, and Hanna Tyson, Rungnapa Por.Muangphet and Phetjee Jaa Or.Meekun by unanimous decision.

Tsumura was scheduled to fight Wu Hoi Yan at Shoot Boxing 2018 act.1, for the Energy Fight×Shoot Boxing −48 kg title. She beat Yan by decision.

Tsumura made her first title defense against MISAKI at Shoot Boxing 2018 act.1. She won the fight by majority decision.

==== Shootboxing Girls S-Cup tournament ====
Following her first title defense, Tsumura was scheduled to fight So Hee Lim at Shoot Boxing 2018 act.2. Lim came into the fight over the weight limit, and forfeited half of her purse. Lim won the fight by unanimous decision.

Tsumura took part in her first Shootboxing Girls World S-cup on July 6, 2018. She fought a rematch with So Hee Lim in the quarterfinals and won by unanimous decision. She beat Kaewta Por Muengpetch by an extra round decision in the semifinals. Tsumura lost to Jleana Valentino by majority decision in the tournament finals.

Tsumura rebounded from this loss by winning her next three fights against Haruka Yamaguchi, Hinata Terayama and TOMOMI by decision.

=== K-1 ===
In 2020, Tsumura signed with K-1. She was scheduled to make her debut at K-1 World GP 2020 in Osaka, against Miho Takanashi. Miho won the fight by unanimous decision.

Tsumura next fought Mako Yamada at K-1 World GP 2021: K’Festa 4 Day.2. She beat Yamada by unanimous decision.

Tsumura fought the reigning Krush atomweight champion Miyuu Sugawara at K-1 World GP 2021 Japan Bantamweight Tournament. She won the fight by majority decision. They were scheduled to fight a rematch at Krush 128, for Sugawara's Krush title. Sugawara later withdrew from the bout, due to the COVID-19 protocols. Tsumura was rescheduled to fight Kira Matsutani in an exhibition bout at the same event. The fight ended in a per-determined draw.

Tsumura was rescheduled to challenge the reigning Krush atomweight champion Miyuu Sugawara at Krush 131 on November 20, 2021. She lost the fight by unanimous decision.

Tsumura was scheduled to face Raika at Krush 134 on February 20, 2022. Tsumura announced her withdrawal from the bout on February 10, as she had to undergo surgery to remove a benign ovarian tumor. She successfully underwent surgery on March 8.

Tsumura was booked to face Phayahong Ayothayafightgym at K-1: Ring of Venus on June 25, 2022. She lost the fight by unanimous decision.

== Titles and accomplishments ==
- Shoot Boxing
  - 2018 Shoot Boxing Girls S-Cup −48 kg World Tournament Runner-up
  - 2017 Energy Fight×Shoot Boxing −48 kg Champion
  - 2016 Shoot Boxing Japan Minimumweight Champion (Defended once)
  - 2016 Shoot Boxing Asia Tournament −48 kg Champion
  - 2015 Shoot Boxing Girls S-Cup Japan Tournament Champion
  - 2014 Shoot Boxing Girls S-Cup Japan Tournament Runner-up
  - 2013 Shoot Boxing JK −48 kg Tournament Champion
  - 2012 Shoot Boxing JK −48 kg Tournament Champion

== Fight record ==
=== Mixed martial arts exhibition record ===
Exhibition record breakdown		
3 matches	2 wins	1 loss
By knockout	1	0
By submission	0	1
By decision	1	0

Res.	Record	Opponent	Method	Event	Date	Round	Time	Location	Notes
Win	2–1	Mikiko Hiyama	Decision (unanimous)	Kakutou Dairi Sensou 3rd Season	December 29, 2018	3	5:00	Japan	
Loss	1–1	Itsuki Hirata	Submission (rear-naked choke)	Kakutou Dairi Sensou 3rd Season	December 1, 2018	1	2:36	Japan	Semi-Final round.
Win	1–0	Takumi Umehara	TKO (Punches)	Kakutou Dairi Sensou 3rd Season	October 10, 2018	2	4:12	Japan	Quarter-Final round.

=== Kickboxing record ===
Professional Kickboxing Record
40 Wins (4 (T)KO's), 7 Losses, 0 Draw, 0 No Contest
Date	Result	Opponent	Event	Location	Method	Round	Time
2022-06-25	Loss	(Thailand) Phayahong Ayothayafightgym	K-1: Ring of Venus, Atomweight World Grand Prix Semifinals	Tokyo, Japan	Decision (Unanimous)	3	3:00
2021-11-20	Loss	(Japan) Miyuu Sugawara	Krush 131	Tokyo, Japan	Decision (Unanimous)	3	3:00
For the Krush Women's Atomweight Championship.
2021-05-30	Win	(Japan) Miyuu Sugawara	K-1 World GP 2021 Japan Bantamweight Tournament	Tokyo, Japan	Decision (Majority)	3	3:00
2021-03-28	Win	(Japan) Mako Yamada	K-1 World GP 2021: K’Festa 4 Day.2	Tokyo, Japan	Decision (Unanimous)	3	3:00
2020-09-22	Loss	(Japan) Miho Takanashi	K-1 World GP 2020 in Osaka	Osaka, Japan	Decision (Unanimous)	3	3:00
2019-04-27	Win	(Japan) TOMOMI	Shoot Boxing 2019 act.2	Tokyo, Japan	Decision (Unanimous)	3	3:00
2019-02-11	Win	(Japan) Hinata Terayama	Shoot Boxing 2019 act.1	Tokyo, Japan	Decision (Majority)	3	3:00
2018-09-15	Win	(Japan) Haruka Yamaguchi	Shoot Boxing 2018 act.4	Tokyo, Japan	Decision (Unanimous)	3	3:00
2018-07-06	Loss	(Italy) Jleana Valentino	SHOOT BOXING Girls S-cup 〜48 kg World Tournament 2018〜 Final	Tokyo, Japan	Decision (Majority)	3	3:00
For the Shoot Boxing Girls S-Cup −48kg title.
2018-07-06	Win	(Thailand) Kaewta Por Muengpetch	SHOOT BOXING Girls S-cup 〜48 kg World Tournament 2018〜 Semi Final	Tokyo, Japan	Ext.R Decision (Unanimous)	4	3:00
2018-07-06	Win	(Korea) So Hee Lim	SHOOT BOXING Girls S-cup 〜48 kg World Tournament 2018〜 Quarter Final	Tokyo, Japan	Decision (Unanimous)	3	3:00
2018-04-01	Loss	(Korea) So Hee Lim	Shoot Boxing 2018 act.2	Tokyo, Japan	Decision (Unanimous)	3	3:00
2018-02-10	Win	(Japan) MISAKI	Shoot Boxing 2018 act.1	Tokyo, Japan	Decision (Majority)	5	3:00
Defends Shoot Boxing Japan Minimumweight title.
2017-12-17	Win	(Hong Kong) Wu Hoi Yan	Shoot Boxing 2018 act.1	Hong Kong	Decision	5	3:00
Wins Energy Fight×Shoot Boxing −48kg title.
2017-11-22	Win	(Thailand) Phetjee Jaa Or.Meekun	Shoot Boxing GROUND ZERO TOKYO 2017	Tokyo, Japan	Decision (Unanimous)	3	3:00
2017-09-16	Win	(Thailand) Rungnapa Por.Muangphet	SHOOT BOXING 2017 act.4	Tokyo, Japan	Decision (Unanimous)	3	3:00
2017-07-07	Win	(Poland) Hanna Tyson	SHOOT BOXING Girls S-Cup 2017	Tokyo, Japan	Decision (Unanimous)	3	3:00
2017-04-08	Win	(Hong Kong) Vicky Tan	SHOOT BOXING 2017 act.2	Tokyo, Japan	TKO (Doctor Stoppage)	2	2:00
2017-02-11	Win	(Hong Kong) Hoi Ling Kwok	SHOOT BOXING 2017 act.1	Tokyo, Japan	Decision (Majority)	3	3:00
2016-11-11	Win	(Japan) Union Akari	SHOOT BOXING World Tournament S-Cup 2016	Tokyo, Japan	Ext.R Decision (Unanimous)	6	3:00
Wins the Shoot Boxing Japan Minimumweight title.
2016-10-09	Win	(Japan) Mei Umeo	Shoot Boxing Young Caesar Cup act.4	Tokyo, Japan	Decision (Unanimous)	3	3:00
2016-09-19	Win	(Japan) Renju DATE	Shoot Boxing 2016 act.4	Tokyo, Japan	TKO (3 Knockdowns)	1	0:36
2016-07-07	Win	(Japan) Union Akari	Shoot Boxing Girls S-Cup Asia Tournament, Final	Tokyo, Japan	Ext.R Decision (Majority)	4	3:00
Wins Shoot Boxing Asia Tournament −48kg title.
2016-07-07	Win	(Japan) Yurika GSB	Shoot Boxing Girls S-Cup Asia Tournament, Semi Final	Tokyo, Japan	Decision (Unanimous)	3	3:00
2016-06-18	Win	(Japan) MISAKI	Shoot Boxing Young Caesar Cup act.2	Tokyo, Japan	Decision (Unanimous)	3	3:00
2015-10-03	Win	(Japan) MARI	Shoot Boxing The Last Bomb	Osaka, Japan	Decision (Unanimous)	3	3:00
2015-08-21	Win	(Japan) Momi	Shoot Boxing Girls S-Cup 2015 Japan Tournament, Final	Tokyo, Japan	Ext.R Decision (Unanimous)	4	3:00
Wins Shoot Boxing Girls S-Cup Japan Tournament title.
2015-08-21	Win	(Japan) V.V Mei	Shoot Boxing Girls S-Cup 2015 Japan Tournament, Semi Final	Tokyo, Japan	Ext.R Decision (Unanimous)	4	3:00
2015-08-21	Win	(Japan) Emi Matsushita	Shoot Boxing Girls S-Cup 2015 Japan Tournament, Quarter Final	Tokyo, Japan	Decision (Unanimous)	3	3:00
2015-05-24	Win	(Taiwan) Kai Ting Chuang	Onna Matsuri 2015: ~J-Girls x Shoot Boxing~	Tokyo, Japan	Decision (Unanimous)	3	3:00
2015-02-21	Win	(Japan) Miho	Shoot Boxing 2015 ~SB 30th Anniversary~ act.1	Tokyo, Japan	Decision (Unanimous)	3	3:00
2014-09-20	Win	(Japan) Hana DATE	Shoot Boxing 2014 act.4	Tokyo, Japan	Decision (Unanimous)	3	3:00
2014-08-02	Loss	(Japan) Yukari Yamaguchi	Shoot Boxing Girls S-Cup 2014 Tournament, Final	Tokyo, Japan	Ext.R Decision (Split)	4	2:00
For the Shoot Boxing Girls S-Cup Japan Tournament title.
2014-08-02	Win	(Japan) Momi	Shoot Boxing Girls S-Cup 2014 Tournament, Semi Final	Tokyo, Japan	Decision (Unanimous)	3	2:00
2014-02-23	Win	(Japan) Eneos Akari	Shoot Boxing 2014 act.1	Tokyo, Japan	Decision (Unanimous)	3	3:00
2013-12-23	Win	(Japan) Kira☆Chihiro	Shoot Boxing 2013	Osaka, Japan	Decision (Majority)	3	3:00
2013-08-03	Win	(Japan) Kira☆Yuuki	Shoot Boxing Girls S-Cup 2013, Joshikousei Tournament Final	Tokyo, Japan	KO (Right Hook)	1	1:08
Wins 2013 Shoot Boxing JKS48 Tournament title.
2013-08-03	Win	(Japan) COMACHI	Shoot Boxing Girls S-Cup 2013, Joshikousei Tournament Semi Final	Tokyo, Japan	Decision (Unanimous)	3	2:00
2013-04-20	Win	(Japan) Fuuka Yoshino	Shoot Boxing 2013 act.2, Joshikousei Tournament Quarter Final	Tokyo, Japan	Decision (Unanimous)	3	2:00
2013-02-22	Loss	(Japan) Momi	Shoot Boxing 2013 act.1	Tokyo, Japan	Ext.R Decision (Majority)	4	3:00
2012-08-25	Win	(Japan) Eneos Akari	Shoot Boxing Girls S-Cup 2012, Joshikousei Tournament Final	Tokyo, Japan	TKO (Towel thrown)	2	1:09
Wins 2012 Shoot Boxing JKS48 Tournament title.
2012-08-25	Win	(Japan) Tachiyuki	Shoot Boxing Girls S-Cup 2012, Joshikousei Tournament Semi Final	Tokyo, Japan	Decision (Unanimous)	3	2:00
2012-04-13	Win	(Japan) Yuuki Kira	Shoot Boxing Road to S-Cup act.2, Joshikousei Tournament Quarter Final	Tokyo, Japan	Decision (Unanimous)	3	2:00
2012-02-05	Win	(Japan) Tsubaki Oshima	Shoot Boxing Road to S-Cup act.1	Tokyo, Japan	Decision (Majority)	3	2:00
2011-11-06	Win	(Japan) Asuka Inoue	Shoot Boxing Shoot the SHOOTO 2011	Tokyo, Japan	Ext.R Decision (Unanimous)	4	2:00
2011-09-10	Win	(Japan) Mariko Akechi	Shoot Boxing 2011 act.4	Tokyo, Japan	Decision (Unanimous)	3	2:00
2011-09-10	Win	(Japan) Yoko Yamada	Shoot Boxing Girls S-Cup 2011 Japan Selection Tournament	Tokyo, Japan	Disqualification	1	1:52
Legend: Win Loss Draw/No contest Notes

== See also ==
- List of female kickboxers
