= Mongkutpetch KhaolakMuaythai =

Thai muay thai kickboxer (born 2005)

Mongkutpetch
- Born: Arissara Noon-Eiad; February 5, 2005 (age 21); Phatthalung province, Thailand
- Other names: Mongkutpetch Petchprawfah (มงกุฎเพชร เพชรพราวฟ้า); Mongkutphet Kiatkasem (มงกุฎเพชร เกียรติกาเซ็ม); Mongkutphet Taewmuanglung (มงกุฎเพชร แตวเมืองลุง); Mongkutpetch Petchyindee Academy
- Height: 160 cm (5 ft 3 in)
- Weight: 46 kg (101 lb; 7.2 st)
- Division: Atomweight; Minimumweight; Light Flyweight
- Style: Muay Thai; Muay Khao
- Stance: Orthodox
- Fighting out of: Khao Lak, Thailand
- Team: Khao Lak Muay Thai; Petchyindee

Kickboxing record
- Total: 40
- Wins: 32
- By knockout: 2
- Losses: 5
- By knockout: 1
- Draws: 3

Mongkutpetch KhaolakMuaythai
Medal record

Representing Thailand

Women's Muay Thai

IFMA World Muaythai Championships
Gold medal – first place	2022 Abu Dhabi	45 kg

IFMA Youth World Muaythai Championships
Gold medal – first place	2016 Bangkok	36 kg
Gold medal – first place	2017 Bangkok	40 kg
Gold medal – first place	2018 Bangkok	42 kg
Gold medal – first place	2019 Antalya	45 kg
Gold medal – first place	2021 Bangkok	45 kg
Gold medal – first place	2022 Kuala Lumpur	45 kg
Gold medal – first place	2023 Kemer	45 kg

South East Asian Games
Silver medal – second place	2025 Bangkok	45 kg

Arissara Noon-Eiad (Thai: อริศรา นุ่นเอียด), known professionally as Mongkutpetch KhaolakMuaythai (Thai: มงกุฎเพชร เขาหลักมวยไทย) is a Thai muay thai fighter. She is the reigning Rajadamnern Stadium Women's Minimumweight Champion.

== Career ==
Mongkutpetch faced Saya Ito at Rajadamnern World Series on 9 September 2023. She won the fight by unanimous decision.

On December 11, 2022, Mongkutpetch faced Ai Tanaka at Muay Thai Super Champ. She lost by second-round knockout.

Mongkutpetch made her kickboxing rules debut at RISE World Series 2023 - Final Round against Koyuki Miyazaki on December 16, 2023. She lost the fight by unanimous decision, with scores of 30–27, 30–27 and 30–26.

Mongkutpetch faced Misaki Morita at Suk Wanchai MuayThai Super Fight on June 30, 2024. She won the fight by unanimous decision, with all three judges scoring the bout 49–48 in favor of her opponent.

On March 8, 2025, Mongkutpetch faced Petchprajan Sandphoklang at Rajadamnern World Series. She won the fight by unanimous decision.

Mongkutpetch challenged Phayahong Ayothayafightgym for her Rajadamnern Stadium Women's Minimumweight title at a Rajadamnern World Series event on April 5, 2025. She won the fight by unanimous decision.

Mongkutpetch made the first defense of her Rajadamnern Stadium Women's Minimumweight title on June 14, 2025, against Duangdawnoi Looksaikongdin at Rajadamnern World Series. She won the fight by unanimous decision.

For her undefeated 2025 campaign, Mongkutpetch received the prestigious Sports Authority of Thailand Fighter of the Year award.

Mongkutpetch made the second defense of her Rajadamnern Stadium Minimumweight title on February 22, 2026, against Devina Martin at Rajadamnern World Series. She won the fight by unanimous decision.

== Championships and accomplishments ==
=== Professional ===
- Rajadamnern Stadium
  - 2025 Rajadamnern Stadium Minimumweight (105 lbs) Champion
    - Thre successful title defenses
- Patong Stadium
  - 2022 Patong Stadium Minimumweight (105 lbs) Champion

=== Amateur ===
- International Federation of Muaythai Associations
  - 2016 I.F.M.A. Youth World Championships U13 -36 kg (gold)
  - 2017 I.F.M.A. Youth World Championships U13 -40 kg (gold)
  - 2018 I.F.M.A. Youth World Championships U13 -42 kg (gold)
  - 2019 I.F.M.A. Youth World Championships U15 -45 kg (gold)
  - 2021 I.F.M.A. Youth World Championships U17 -45 kg (gold)
  - 2022 I.F.M.A. Youth World Championships U17 -45 kg (gold)
  - 2022 I.F.M.A. Senior World Championships -45 kg (gold)
  - 2023 I.F.M.A. Youth World Championships U23 -45 kg (gold)
- Southeast Asian Games
  - 2025 SEA Games Muaythai -45 kg (silver)

=== Awards ===
- 2025 World Muaythai Organization Female Fighter of the Year
- 2025 Sports Authority of Thailand Female Muay Thai Fighter of the Year

== Fight record ==
Professional Muay Thai & Kickboxing Record
32 Wins (2 (T)KO's), 5 Losses, 3 Draws
Date	Result	Opponent	Event	Location	Method	Round	Time
2026-09-05	Win	(Thailand) Petchsaiparn Sitpanancherng	Rajadamnern World Series	Bangkok, Thailand	TKO (Knees and elbows)	1	1:59
Defends the Rajadamnern Stadium Women's Minimumweight (105 lbs) title.
2026-02-21	Win	(Australia) Devina Martin	Rajadamnern World Series	Bangkok, Thailand	Decision (Unanimous)	5	2:00
Defends the Rajadamnern Stadium Women's Minimumweight (105 lbs) title.
2025-09-27	Win	(Thailand) Mafia Petchmongkoldee	Rajadamnern World Series	Bangkok, Thailand	Decision (Unanimous)	3	2:00
2025-06-14	Win	(Thailand) Duangdawnoi Looksaikongdin	Rajadamnern World Series	Bangkok, Thailand	Decision (Unanimous)	5	2:00
Defends the Rajadamnern Stadium Women's Minimumweight (105 lbs) title.
2025-04-05	Win	(Thailand) Phayahong Ayothayafightgym	Rajadamnern World Series	Bangkok, Thailand	Decision (Unanimous)	5	2:00
Wins the Rajadamnern Stadium Women's Minimumweight (105 lbs) title.
2025-03-08	Win	(Thailand) Petchprajan Sandphoklang	Rajadamnern World Series	Bangkok, Thailand	Decision (Unanimous)	3	2:00
2024-12-01	Win	(Japan) Saya Ito	Rajadamnern World Series Japan	Yokohama, Japan	Decision (Unanimous)	3	2:00
2024-11-09	Win	(Thailand) Pornnapha Por.Tawatchawin	Rajadamnern World Series	Bangkok, Thailand	TKO (Knees and elbows)	1	1:43
2024-08-10	Win	(Hong Kong) Hoi Yi Wong	Rajadamnern World Series	Bangkok, Thailand	Decision (Unanimous)	3	2:00
2024-06-30	Win	(Japan) Misaki	Wanchai MuayThai Super Fight	Nagoya, Japan	Decision (Unanimous)	5	2:00
2024-04-20	Win	(Thailand) Nongparnfah FamilyMuayThai	Rajadamnern World Series	Bangkok, Thailand	Decision (Unanimous)	3	2:00
2023-12-16	Loss	(Japan) Koyuki Miyazaki	RISE World Series 2023 - Final Round	Tokyo, Japan	Decision (Unanimous)	3	3:00
2023-09-09	Win	(Japan) Saya Ito	Rajadamnern World Series	Bangkok, Thailand	Decision (Unanimous)	3	2:00
2023-08-19	Win	(Italy) Elisabetta Solinas	LWC Super Champ	Bangkok, Thailand	Decision	3	3:00
2023-05-21	Win	(Japan) Noah Fujiwara	Muay Lok Hachioji 2023	Tokyo, Japan	Decision (Unanimous)	5	3:00
2023-03-17	Win	(Thailand) Kaosuay Por.Kobkua	SAT T Sports 7	Bangkok, Thailand	Decision	5	2:00
2023-04-15	Win	(Thailand) Petchchompoo RuanPichaiMuayThai	Rajadamnern World Series	Bangkok, Thailand	Decision (Unanimous)	3	2:00
2022-12-11	Loss	(Japan) Ai Tanaka	Muay Thai Super Champ	Bangkok, Thailand	KO (Body kick)	2	1:53
2022-10-28	Loss	(Thailand) Duangdawnoi Looksaikongdin	Rajadamnern World Series	Bangkok, Thailand	Decision (Unanimous)	3	2:00
2022-10-06	Win	(Japan) Karen	Patong Stadium	Phuket, Thailand	Decision (Unanimous)	5	2:00
Wins the vacant Patong Stadium Minimumweight (105 lbs) title.
Legend: Win Loss Draw/No contest Notes

Amateur Muay Thai Record
Date	Result	Opponent	Event	Location	Method	Round	Time
2025-12-17	Loss	(Philippines) Islay Erika Bomogao	SEA Games 2025, Final	Bangkok, Thailand	Decision (29:28)	3	3:00
Wins 2025 SEA Games Muay Thai -45kg Silver Medal.
2025-12-16	Win	(Malaysia) Damia Husna Azian	SEA Games 2025, Semifinals	Bangkok, Thailand	TKO	2	
2024-06-04	Loss	(Vietnam) Huynh Ha Huu Hieu	2024 IFMA Senior World Championships 2025, Quarterfinals	Patras, Greece	Decision (29:28)	3	3:00
2023-10-04	Win	(Turkey) Gamze Korkmaz	2023 IFMA Youth World Championships, Final	Kemer, Turkey	Decision (30:27)	3	3:00
Wins 2023 IFMA Youth World Championship U23 -45kg Gold Medal.
2023-10-03	Win	(Vietnam) Yen Ta Thi Kim	2023 IFMA Youth World Championships, Semifinals	Kemer, Turkey	Decision (30:27)	3	3:00
2023-10-02	Win	(Malaysia) Nur Insyirah Binti Mandol	2023 IFMA Youth World Championships, Quarterfinals	Kemer, Turkey	TKO	1	
2022-06-04	Win	(Turkey) Gamze Yalçın	2022 IFMA Senior World Championships, Final	Abu Dhabi	Draw (judges voting)	3	3:00
Wins 2022 IFMA Senior World Championships -45kg Gold Medal.
2022-06-02	Win	(Sweden) Camilla Danielsson	2022 IFMA Senior World Championships, Semifinals	Abu Dhabi	Decision (30:27)	3	3:00
2022-05-29	Win	(Morocco) Chabour Ghizlane	2022 IFMA Senior World Championships, Quarterfinals	Abu Dhabi	Decision (30:26)	3	3:00
Legend: Win Loss Draw/No contest Notes

== See also ==
- List of female kickboxers
- List of K-1 champions
