= Saya Ito =

Japanese kickboxer (born 1999)

- Born: 伊藤紗弥; 7 January 1999 (age 27); Hachioji, Tokyo, Japan
- Nickname: Muay Thai Genius
- Height: 1.54 m (5 ft 1/2 in)
- Weight: 47 kg (104 lb; 7 st 6 lb)
- Division: Pinweight; Atomweight; Mini Flyweight
- Style: Kickboxing; Muay thai
- Stance: Orthodox
- Fighting out of: Hachioji, Tokyo, Japan
- Team: Shobukai Gym
- Trainer: Katsuyoshi Imai
- Years active: 2011 - present

Kickboxing record
- Total: 53
- Wins: 39
- By knockout: 7
- Losses: 12
- By knockout: 1
- Draws: 2

Saya Ito (born 7 January 1999) is a Japanese kickboxer and Nak Muay, currently competing in the pinweight division of Battle of Muaythai. She is the current World Muaythai Council World Mini Flyweight champion and Battle of Muaythai Light Flyweight champion.

A professional competitor since 2011, she is the former WPMF two-time World and one-time Japanese Pinweight champion and the former WBC Muaythai World Mini Flyweight Champion.

== Muay thai career ==
=== WPMF title fights ===
==== First WPMF World Pinweight title reign ====
Ito made her debut against Phetseenung Sitjeephon on 12 August 2011, in Bangkok, Thailand. She won the fight by decision. She likewise defeated Muangsee Or.Wanchai by decision at Miracle Muay Thai Festival on 17 March 2012. In her third professional fight, Ito was scheduled to face Hongkwa for the Onesgongchai Minimumweight title at the Queen's Birthday event on 12 August 2012. She won the fight by unanimous decision.

For her fourth professional fight, Ito was scheduled to face Pheknongsi Mor.Kasetsart for the WPMF World Pinmweight title at Queen's Cup - Sanam Luang on 11 August 2013. She won the fight by unanimous decision.

Ito was scheduled to face Hae-yeong Park at Muay Lok 2014 1st on 27 April 2014. She beat Park by unanimous decision.

Ito was scheduled to fight Haru Tajima for the WPMF Japan Pinweight title at Tenkaichi 71 on 18 May 2014. Ito suffered her first professional loss, losing the fight by unanimous decision, with all three judges scoring the bout as 29-28. This was followed by her first professional draw, with Momi at Muay Lok 2014 2nd on 13 July 2014. Ito suffered her second professional loss to Sylvie von Duuglas-Ittu, by unanimous decision, at the Queen's Cup event on 12 August 2014.

==== WPMF Japan Pinweight champion ====
Ito once again challenged Haru Tajima for the WPMF Japan Pinweight title at Tenkaichi 73 on 7 September 2014. Ito won the rematch by unanimous decision.

Ito was scheduled to face Kira☆Yuuki at WPMF JAPAN The Battle of Muaythai VI on 7 December 2014. Ito won the fight by unanimous decision. She was next scheduled to fight Somying sor Phaitong at MBK Fights on 12 February 2015. Ito won the fight by unanimous decision.

Ito made her first title defense at The Battle of Muaythai VII × Muay Lok on 5 April 2015, in a rematch with Kira☆Chihiro. Ito was once again victorious against Kira, winning by unanimous decision.

Ito was scheduled to meet Superball Paradorngym in a non-title bout at MuayThaiOpen31 on 18 June 2015. She won the fight by a fourth-round technical knockout.

Ito made her second title defense against Yoshimi Hatayama at The Battle of Muay Thai 9 on 19 July 2015. She won the fight by unanimous decision.

==== Second WPMF World Pinweight title reign ====
Ito was scheduled to challenge Ayaka Miyauchi for the WPMF World Pinweight title at Suk Weerasakreck 10 on 27 September 2015. Ito won the fight by unanimous decision.

Ito met Rojana Rombogym in a non-title bout at MAT vol.1 on 19 December 2015. She won the bout by a fifth-round technical knockout.

Ito made her first world title defense at M-ONE on 21 March 2016, in a rematch with Ayaka Miyauchi. She won the fight by majority decision.

Ito was scheduled to face Kaeworka Kudenmuaythaigym at Muay Lok 2017 2nd on 18 June 2017, in a non-title bout. She won the fight by unanimous decision.

=== WMC and WBC Muaythai title fights ===
Ito was scheduled to face Faachiangrai Sor.Sanchai, for the WMC Miniflyweight title, at Muay Lok 2017 3rd on 11 August 2017. Ito won the fight by unanimous decision, with all three judges scoring the fight 49-48.

After winning the WMC title, Ito was scheduled to face Yodting Sit Namkabuan for the WBC Muay Thai World Mini Flyweight title at NJKF 2017 4th on 26 November 2017. Ito won the fight by unanimous decision, with scores of 49-47, 50-46 and 50-46.

Following a 13-month layoff, Ito was scheduled to face the future RISE Flyweight champion Manazo Kobayashi at KING OF KNOCK OUT 2018 on 9 December 2018. It was Ito's only fight of the year. Kobayashi won the closely contested bout by majority decision, with two of the judges scoring the fight as 49-48 for Kobayashi, while the third judge scored it as a 49-49 draw.

=== Battle of Muaythai ===
==== BoM Atomweight champion ====
Ito was scheduled to face Nana Okuwaki at The Battle Of Muay Thai Season II vol.6 Part 1 on 7 December 2019. Ito won the fight by unanimous decision, with scores of 50-45, 50-46, 50-45.

Ito was scheduled to fight the former NJKF Minerva Japan Pinweight champion Ayaka at RISE GIRLS POWER 2 on 11 February 2020. Ayaka won the fight by a third-round knockout. It was the first knockout loss of Ito's professional career.

Ito was scheduled to compete at the Muelok Hachioji 2020 event on 26 April 2020. The event was later cancelled, due to the COVID-19 pandemic.

Following a ten-month layoff, Ito was scheduled to face Shoko JSK at BOM WAVE 03 ~ Get Over The COVID-19 on 6 December 2020. Ito won the fight by unanimous decision, with scores of 49-48, 49-47 and 49-47.

==== BoM Pinweight champion ====
Ito was scheduled to rematch Ayaka, for the inaugural Battle of Muay Thai Pinweight title, at Muay Lok 2021 Hachioji on 25 April 2021. Ito's corner furthermore promised a one million yen win reward if Ayaka won. She won the rematch by unanimous decision.

Ito was scheduled to fight Mirey at The Battle Of Muay Thai WAVE 05 - Get over the COVID-19 on 4 July 2021. Ito won the fight by unanimous decision, with all three judges scoring the bout 29-28 in her favor.

Ito was scheduled to face the reigning RISE Atomweight champion Koyuki Miyazaki at RISE GIRLS POWER 5 on 12 September 2021. It was her second career fight under kickboxing rules. The fight was ruled a draw after the first three rounds were contested, with two of the judges being split as to the winner of the bout, while the third judge scored it as an even draw. Miyazaki was awarded the majority decision, after an extra round was fought.

==== BoM Light Flyweight champion ====
Ito was scheduled to fight the #5 ranked NJKF light flyweight RINA for the inaugural Battle of Muay Thai Light Flyweight title at BOM WAVE 06 – Get Over The COVID-19 on 7 November 2021. She won by unanimous decision.

Ito was booked to face Namwan Sor.Khongkraphan for the vacant IPCC World Atomweight title at MuayLok 2022 on 15 May 2022. She won the fight by unanimous decision, with scores of 49–48, 49–48 and 49–47.

Ito faced Petchchumpae Highlandgym at the 31 July 2022, Muay Thai Super Champ event. It was Ito's first fight in Thailand since her draw against Kenkaew Korgonkiew in 2016. The fight was contested at 48 kg. She won the fight by decision.

Ito took part in a -50 kg tournament, organized by Muaythai Super Champ, the semifinals of which were held on 30 October 2022. She was placed in the A-block tournament, the winner of which would face the winner of the B-block tournament in December. Ito won both the semifinal bout against Nancy Tnusu Yala and the final bout against Sabah Chergui in the same manner, by decision. Ito faced the B-block tournament winner Lisa Brierley in the overall tournament final. She lost the fight by unanimous decision.

Ito faced Duangdawnoi Looksaikongdin in a 47.5 kg bout at Suk Wan Kingthong on 19 February 2023. The pair was previously booked to face each other in April and June 2016, although the fight was cancelled both times for undisclosed reasons. Ito lost the fight by unanimous decision, with two scorecards of 49–47 and one scorecard of 49–48.

Ito faced Nonglek Jeabpanna for the vacant IMSA World -48 kg title at the 20 March 2023, Rambaa Somdet Promotion event. She won the fight by unanimous decision.

Ito faced Kim Townsend for the vacant WBC Muay Thai Diamond Light-flyweight World title at RISE Championship on 6 May 2023. She lost the fight by decision.

Ito faced Seanngam Kamnachet Muangchon at BOM 41 on 9 July 2023, in her return to the atomweight (-46.2 kg) division. She won the fight by unanimous decision.

=== Rajadamnern World Series ===
Ito faced Mongkutpetch KhaolakMuaythai at Rajadamnern World Series on 9 September 2023. She lost the fight by unanimous decision.

Ito faced Mintra Anuwatgym at BOM 45 on 26 November 2023. She won the fight by a second-round knockout.

Ito faced Petchplaifon Sitmink at the Rajadamnern Stadium on 22 December 2023. Petchplaifon missed weight by 0.5 kg and forfeited a portion of her purse at the official weigh-ins.

Ito faced Sanengarm Kamnanchetmuangchon at TOP BRIGHTS 1 on 21 January 2024. She won the fight by split decision.

Ito was expected to face Nongparnfah FamilyMuaytai at the inaugural Rajadamnern World Series Japan event on 12 February 2024. Nongparnfah withdrew on 26 January 2024 and was replaced by Nongmin Tor.Songkiat. Ito won the fight by a second-round technical knockout.

Ito faced Phayahong Banchamek at the 14 April 2024, Rajadamnern World Series Japan event. She won the fight by unanimous decision.

Ito faced Nongparnfah FamilyMuayThai on 14 July 2024 at a Rajadamnern World Series Japan event. She won the fight by unanimous decision.

Ito faced Phayahong Ayothayafightgym for the inaugural Rajadamnern Stadium Women's Minimumweight (105 lbs) title on 19 October 2024. She lost the fight by unanimous decision.

== Championships and accomplishments ==
=== Professional ===
- World Boxing Council Muaythai
  - 2017 WBC Muaythai World Mini Flyweight Champion
- World Muaythai Council
  - 2017 WMC World Mini Flyweight Champion
- World Professional Muaythai Federation
  - 2013 WPMF World Pinweight Champion
  - 2015 WPMF World Pinweight Champion (1 Defense)
  - 2014 WPMF Japanese Pinweight Champion (2 Defenses)
- The Battle of Muay Thai
  - 2021 BoM Pinweight Champion
  - 2021 BoM Light Flyweight Champion
- International Professional Combat Council
  - 2022 IPCC World Atomweight Champion
- OneSongchai
  - 2012 S-1 Minimumweight World Champion
- International MuayThai Sport Association
  - 2023 IMSA World -48 kg Champion

=== Amateur ===
- Thepprasit Stadium
  - Thepprasit Stadium -37 kg Champion
- M-1
  - 2009 M-1 Junior -35 kg Champion
  - 2010 M-1 Junior Women -40 kg Champion
  - 2011 M-1 Junior -45 kg Champion
  - 2012 M-1 Junior -45 kg Champion
  - 2012 M-1 Junior -50 kg Champion
- WINDY Super Fight
  - 2011 WINDY Super Fight -40 kg Champion
- DEEP KICK
  - 2011 TOP RUN Queen Tournament -45 kg Winner

== Fight record ==
Professional record
39 Wins (7 (T)KOs), 12 Losses, 2 Draws
Date	Result	Opponent	Event	Location	Method	Round	Time
2026-08-14	Loss	(Thailand) Nongnuk Sor Dechapan	ONE The Inner Circle 26, Lumpinee Stadium	Bangkok, Thailand	Decision (Unanimous)	3	3:00
2025-05-11	Win	(Thailand) Kwayang	Muay Lok Hachioji 2025	Hachioji, Japan	Decision (Unanimous)	5	2:00
2025-02-22	Win	(Thailand) Kaosuay Por.Kobkua	Rajadamnern World Series	Bangkok, Thailand	Decision (Unanimous)	3	2:00
2024-12-01	Loss	(Thailand) Mongkutpetch KhaolakMuaythai	Rajadamnern World Series Japan	Yokohama, Japan	Decision (Unanimous)	3	2:00
2024-10-19	Loss	(Thailand) Phayahong Banchamek	Rajadamnern World Series	Bangkok, Thailand	Decision (Unanimous)	5	2:00
For the inaugural Rajadamnern Stadium Women's Minimumweight (105 lbs) title.
2024-07-14	Win	(Thailand) Nongparnfah FamilyMuayThai	Rajadamnern World Series Japan	Chiba, Japan	Decision (Unanimous)	3	2:00
2024-05-14	Win	(Thailand) Petchasakjan	Muay Lok 2024 Hachioji	Hachioji, Japan	TKO (Knee to the body)	2	
2024-04-14	Win	(Thailand) Phayahong Banchamek	Rajadamnern World Series Japan	Chiba, Japan	Decision (Unanimous)	3	2:00
2024-02-12	Win	(Thailand) Nongmin Tor.Songkiat	Rajadamnern World Series Japan	Tokyo, Japan	TKO (Knees to the body)	2	1:55
2024-01-21	Win	(Thailand) Sanengarm Kamnanchetmuangchon	TOP BRIGHTS 1	Tokyo, Japan	Decision (Split)	3	2:00
2023-12-22	Win	(Thailand) Petchplaifon Sitmink	Amazing Muay Thai: Road to Rajadamnern, Rajadamnern Stadium	Bangkok, Thailand	Decision (Unanimous)	3	3:00
2023-11-26	Win	(Thailand) Mintra Anuwatgym	BOM 45	Yokohama, Japan	KO (Right straight)	2	1:07
2023-09-09	Loss	(Thailand) Mongkutpetch KhaolakMuaythai	Rajadamnern World Series	Bangkok, Thailand	Decision (Unanimous)	3	3:00
2023-07-09	Win	(Thailand) Seanngam Kamnachet Muangchon	BOM 41	Tokyo, Japan	Decision (Unanimous)	5	2:00
2023-05-06	Loss	(Australia) Kim Townsend	RISE Championship	Brisbane, Australia	Decision	5	3:00
For the WBC Muay Thai Diamond Light-flyweight World title.
2023-03-20	Win	(Thailand) Nonglek Jeabpanna	Rambaa Somdet Promotion	Pattaya, Thailand	Decision (Unanimous)	5	2:00
Wins the vacant IMSA World -48kg title.
2023-02-19	Loss	(Thailand) Duangdawnoi Looksaikongdin	Suk Wan Kingthong	Tokyo, Japan	Decision (Unanimous)	5	3:00
2022-12-18	Loss	(England) Lisa Brierley	Muay Thai Super Champ, Tournament Final	Bangkok, Thailand	Decision (Unanimous)	3	3:00
For the Muay Thai Super Champ Global House -50kg Tournament title.
2022-10-30	Win	(France) Sabah Chergui	Muay Thai Super Champ, A-block Tournament Final	Bangkok, Thailand	Decision	3	3:00
2022-10-30	Win	(Thailand) Nancy Tnusu Yala	Muay Thai Super Champ, A-block Tournament Semi Final	Bangkok, Thailand	Decision	3	3:00
2022-07-31	Win	(Thailand) Petchchumpae Highlandgym	Muay Thai Super Champ	Bangkok, Thailand	Decision	3	3:00
2022-05-15	Win	(Thailand) Namwan Sor.Khongkraphan	MuayLok 2022	Hachioji, Japan	Decision (Unanimous)	5	2:00
Wins the vacant IPCC World Atomweight title.
2021-11-07	Win	(Japan) RINA	BOM WAVE 06 – Get Over The COVID-19	Yokohama, Japan	Decision (Unanimous)	5	2:00
Wins the inaugural Battle of Muay Thai Light Flyweight title.
2021-09-12	Loss	(Japan) Koyuki Miyazaki	RISE GIRLS POWER 5	Tokyo, Japan	Ext.R Decision (Majority)	4	3:00
2021-07-04	Win	(Peru) Mirey	The Battle Of Muay Thai WAVE 05 - Get over the COVID-19	Yokohama, Japan	Decision (Unanimous)	3	3:00
2021-04-25	Win	(Japan) Ayaka	Muay Lok 2021 Hachioji	Hachioji, Japan	Decision (Unanimous)	5	2:00
Wins the inaugural Battle of Muay Thai Pinweight title.
2020-12-06	Win	(Japan) Shoko JSK	BOM WAVE 03 ~ Get Over The COVID-19	Yokohama, Japan	Decision (Unanimous)	5	2:00
2020-02-11	Loss	(Japan) Ayaka	RISE GIRLS POWER 2	Tokyo, Japan	KO (Punches)	3	1:51
2019-12-07	Win	(Japan) Nana Okuwaki	The Battle Of Muay Thai Season II vol.6 Part 1	Tokyo, Japan	Decision (Unanimous)	3	3:00
2018-12-09	Loss	(Japan) Manazo Kobayashi	KING OF KNOCK OUT 2018	Tokyo, Japan	Decision (Unanimous)	5	2:00
2017-11-26	Win	(Thailand) Yodting Sit Namkabuan	NJKF 2017 4th	Tokyo, Japan	Decision (Unanimous)	5	3:00
Wins the WBC Muay Thai World Mini Flyweight title.
2017-08-11	Win	(Thailand) Faachiangrai Sor.Sanchai	Muay Lok 2017 3rd	Tokyo, Japan	Decision (Unanimous)	5	2:00
Wins the WMC Miniflyweight title.
2017-06-18	Win	(Thailand) Kaeworka Kudenmuaythaigym	Muay Lok 2017 2nd	Tokyo, Japan	Decision (Unanimous)	5	2:00
2016-04-08	Draw	(Thailand) Kenkaew Korgonkiew		Bangkok, Thailand	Decision	5	2:00
2016-03-21	Win	(Japan) Little Tiger	M-ONE	Tokyo, Japan	Decision (Majority)	5	2:00
Defends the WPMF World Pinweight title.
2015-12-19	Win	(Thailand) Rojana Rombogym	MAT vol.1	Tokyo, Japan	TKO (Punches)	5	1:48
2015-09-27	Win	(Japan) Little Tiger	Suk Weerasakreck 10	Tokyo, Japan	Decision (Unanimous)	5	2:00
Wins the WPMF World Pinweight title.
2015-08-21	Win	(Thailand) Pellomanee Sippepaya		Pattaya, Thailand	Decision	5	2:00
2015-07-19	Win	(Japan) Yoshimi Hatayama	The Battle of Muay Thai 9	Yokohama, Japan	Decision (Unanimous)	5	2:00
Defends the WPMF Japan Pinweight title.
2015-06-28	Win	(Thailand) Superball Paradorngym	MuayThaiOpen31	Tokyo, Japan	TKO (Punches)	4	2:08
2015-04-05	Win	(Japan) Kira☆Chihiro	The Battle of Muaythai VII × Muay Lok	Tokyo, Japan	Decision (Unanimous)	5	2:00
Defends the WPMF Japan Pinweight title.
2015-03-28	Win	(Thailand)		Pattaya, Thailand	KO	3	
2015-02-12	Win	(Thailand) Somying sor Phaitong	MBK Fights	Bangkok, Thailand	Decision (Unanimous)	3	3:00
2014-12-07	Win	(Japan) Kira☆Yuuki	WPMF JAPAN The Battle of Muaythai VI	Yokohama, Japan	Decision (Unanimous)	3	2:00
2014-09-07	Win	(Japan) Haru Tajima	Tenkaichi 73	Okinawa, Japan	Decision (Unanimous)	5	2:00
Wins the WPMF Japan Pinweight title.
2014-08-12	Loss	(United States) Sylvie von Duuglas-Ittu	Queen's Cup	Bangkok, Thailand	Decision (Unanimous)	5	2:00
2014-07-13	Draw	(Japan) Momi	Muay Lok 2014 2nd	Tokyo, Japan	Draw (Majority)	3	2:00
2014-05-18	Loss	(Japan) Haru Tajima	Tenkaichi 71	Tokyo, Japan	Decision (Unanimous)	5	2:00
For the WPMF Japan Pinweight title.
2014-04-27	Win	(Korea) Hae-yeong Park	Muay Lok 2014 1st	Tokyo, Japan	Decision (Unanimous)	5	2:00
2013-08-11	Win	(Thailand) Pheknongsi Mor.Kasetsart	Queen's Cup - Sanam Luang	Bangkok, Thailand	Decision (Unanimous)	5	2:00
Wins WPMF World Pinmweight title.
2012-08-12	Win	(Thailand) Hongkwa	Queen's Cup	Bangkok, Thailand	Decision (Unanimous)	5	3:00
Wins S-1 World Minimumweight title.
2012-03-17	Win	(Thailand) Muangsee Or.Wanchai	Miracle Muay Thai Festival	Ayutthaya, Thailand	Decision	5	2:00
2011-08-12	Win	(Thailand) Phetseenung Sitjeephon		Bangkok, Thailand	Decision	3	3:00
Legend: Win Loss Draw/No contest Notes

Amateur record
68 wins (20 KO), 10 losses, 3 draw
Date	Result	Opponent	Event	Location	Method	Round	Time
2012-12-09	Win	(Japan) Kenta Yoshinaga	M-1 Muay Thai Amateur 55	Tokyo, Japan	Decision (Unanimous)	3	2:00
Wins M-1 Junior -50kg title.
2012-06-17	Win	(Japan) Yukari Yamaguchi	Muay Lok 2012 2nd	Tokyo, Japan	Decision (Majority)	2	2:00
2012-05-27	Win	(Japan) Yuya Mori	M-1 Muay Thai Amateur 51	Tokyo, Japan	Decision (Unanimous)	3	2:00
Wins M-1 Junior -45kg title.
2012-04-15	Loss	(Japan) Kakuei Matsumoto	All Japan Jr Kick Tournament -45 kg, Semi Final	Tokyo, Japan	Decision	2	2:00
2012-04-15	Win	(Japan)	All Japan Jr Kick Tournament -45 kg, Quarter Final	Tokyo, Japan	Decision	2	2:00
2012-03-04	Win	(Japan) Kota Nakano	All Japan Jr Kick Kanto Selection Tournament -45 kg, Final	Tokyo, Japan	Decision	2	2:00
2012-03-04	Win	(Japan) Yuya Iwanami	All Japan Jr Kick Kanto Selection Tournament -45 kg, Semi Final	Tokyo, Japan	Decision	2	2:00
2012-01-29	Loss	(Japan) Atsuki Senoo	M-1 Muay Thai Amateur 48, M-1 Tournament -45 kg Semi Final	Chiba, Japan	Decision	2	2:00
2011-12-17	Loss	(Japan) Kira☆Chihiro	Jewels: 17th Ring, JEWELS U-15 Kick Tournament Final	Tokyo, Japan	Decision (Unanimous)	2	2:00
2011-10-23	Win	(Japan) Kira☆Yuuki	DEEP KICK 8 - TOP RUN 2, Queen Tournament Final	Osaka, Japan	Decision (Unanimous)	2	2:00
Wins TOP RUN Queen Tournament -45kg title.
2011-10-23	Win	(Japan) Akane Komori	DEEP KICK 8 - TOP RUN 2, Queen Tournament Semi Final	Osaka, Japan	Decision (Unanimous)	1	1:00
2011-09-11	Win	(Japan) Ryoka	Jewels: 16th Ring	Tokyo, Japan	Decision (Unanimous)	2	2:00
2011-07-31	Win	(Japan) Kaito Gibu	M-1 Muay Thai Amateur 44	Tokyo, Japan	Decision		
2011-07-09	Win	(Japan) Kira☆Chihiro	Jewels: 15th Ring	Tokyo, Japan	Decision (Unanimous)	2	2:00
2011-07-03	Win	(Japan) Kira☆Chihiro	Muay Thai WINDY Super Fight in NAGOYA ～Muay Typhoon!～	Nagoya, Japan	Decision	2	2:00
2011-06-19	Loss	(Japan) Miiri Sasaki	M-1 Muay Thai Amateur 43	Tokyo, Japan	Decision		
For the M-1 Amateur -40kg title.
2011-04-29	Win	(Japan) Kota Nakano	Muay Thai WINDY Super Fight vol.6, Final	Tokyo, Japan	Decision	2	2:00
Wins WINDY Super Fight -40kg title.
2011-02-20	Loss	(Japan) Tenshin Nasukawa	Muay Lok 2011 1st	Tokyo, Japan	Decision	2	2:00
2010-11-07	Loss	(Japan) Kaito Fukuda	Muay Thai WINDY Super Fight vol.5	Tokyo, Japan	Decision	2	2:00
For the Muay Thai Windy Super Fight -40kg title.
2010-11-07	Win	(Japan) Yuichi Suenaga	Muay Thai WINDY Super Fight vol.5	Tokyo, Japan	Decision	2	2:00
2010-10-03	Win	(Japan) Miiri Sasaki	M-1 Muay Thai Amateur 37, Final	Tokyo, Japan	Decision	2	
Wins M-1 Muay Thai Amateur Woment -40kg title.
2010-10-03	Win	(Japan) NORI	M-1 Muay Thai Amateur 37, Semi Final	Tokyo, Japan	TKO (Middle kick)	2	
2010-08-01	Loss	(Japan) Tenshin Nasukawa	Muay Lok Junior 35 kg Tournament, Final	Tokyo, Japan	Decision (Unanimous)	3	2:00
For the Muay Lok -35kg title.
2010-04-25	Win	(Japan) Koya Saito	Muay Lok 2010 2nd	Tokyo, Japan	Decision (Unanimous)	2	
2010-03-28	Win	(Japan) Keigo Nagura	M-1 Muay Thai Amateur 33 - M-1 Kid's CHAMPION CARNIVAL 2010	Tokyo, Japan	Decision (Majority)	3	
Defends M-1 Muay Thai Amateur -35kg title.
2009-12-13	Win	(Japan) Keigo Nagura	M-1 Muay Thai Amateur 30 - M-1 Kid's Champion Carnival '09	Tokyo, Japan	Decision	3	
Wins M-1 Muay Thai Amateur -35kg title.
2009-10-04	Win	(Japan) Keigo Nagura	M-1 Muay Thai Amateur 29, Final	Tokyo, Japan	Decision		
2009-10-04	Win	(Japan) Ryoma	M-1 Muay Thai Amateur 29, Semi Final	Tokyo, Japan	Decision		
2009-08-02	Win	(Japan) Ryoma	Hachioji Fight Club	Tokyo, Japan	Decision		
Legend: Win Loss Draw/No contest Notes

== See also ==
- List of female kickboxers
- List of WPMF female world champions
- List of WBC Muaythai female world champions
