= Aki Suematsu =

Japanese kickboxer

- Born: 12 November 2005 (age 20); Fukuoka, Japan
- Height: 1.59 m (5 ft 2 1/2 in)
- Weight: 45 kg (99 lb; 7 st 1 lb)
- Style: Kickboxing
- Stance: Orthodox
- Fighting out of: Fukuoka, Japan
- Team: K.I.K team BLADE
- Years active: 2022 - present

Kickboxing record
- Total: 12
- Wins: 9
- By knockout: 2
- Losses: 2
- Draws: 1

Aki Suematsu (Japanese: 末松 晄, Suematsu Aki; born 12 November 2005) is a Japanese kickboxer. She is the current K-1 Women's Atomweight Champion

As of June 2025, she is ranked as the ninth-best women's atomweight kickboxer in the world by Beyond Kickboxing.

== Kickboxing career ==
Suematsu made her professional debut against Yoriko Ohara at Kyushu Professional Kickboxing vol.10 on September 26, 2022. She won the fight by a second-round knockout.

=== K-1 ===
Suematsu defeated Miho Yata by unanimous decision at Krush Ring of Venus on April 8, 2023.

Suematsu faced Kiho at Krush 152 on August 27, 2023. The fight was ruled a split decision draw.

Suematsu defeated Riko Kato by unanimous decision at Krush 165 on September 28, 2023.

Suematsu defeated Hiyori Onishi by unanimous decision at Krush 169 on December 8, 2024.

Suematsu defeated Lucille Deadman by unanimous decision in the semifinals of the K-1 Women's Atomweight Grand Prix at K-1 World MAX 2025 on February 9, 2025. In the final, Suematsu lost to Kira Matsutani by majority decision.

Suematsu knocked out Raika in the third round at Krush 174 on May 18, 2025.

Suematsu defeated Hiyori Onishi by unanimous decision at K-1 Dontaku on July 13, 2025.

Suematsu challenged the K-1 Women's Atomweight champion Kira Matsutani at K-1 World MAX 2025 - 70kg World Tournament Opening Round on September 7, 2025. She lost the fight by split decision, after an extra fourth round was contested.

== Championship and accomplishments ==
- K-1
  - 2026 K-1 Women's Atomweight (-45kg) Champion

== Fight record ==
Professional Kickboxing Record
9 Wins (2 (T)KOs), 2 Losses, 1 Draw
Date	Result	Opponent	Event	Location	Method	Round	Time
2026-07-20	Win	(Mexico) Veronica Rodriguez	K-1 Dontaku 2026	Fukuoka, Japan	Ext.R Decision (unanimous)	4	3:00
Wins the K-1 Women's Atomweight Championship.
2025-09-07	Loss	(Japan) Kira Matsutani	K-1 World MAX 2025 - 70kg World Tournament Opening Round	Tokyo, Japan	Ext.R Decision (Split)	4	3:00
For the K-1 Women's Atomweight Championship.
2025-07-13	Win	(Japan) Hiyori Onishi	K-1 Dontaku	Fukuoka, Japan	Decision (Unanimous)	3	3:00
2025-05-18	Win	(Japan) Raika	Krush 174	Osaka, Japan	TKO (Punches)	3	2:15
2025-02-09	Loss	(Japan) Kira Matsutani	K-1 World MAX 2025 - Atomweight Championship Tournament, Final	Tokyo, Japan	Decision (Majority)	3	3:00
For the vacant K-1 Women's Atomweight (-45kg) Championship.
2025-02-09	Win	(Australia) Lucille Deadman	K-1 World MAX 2025 - Atomweight Championship Tournament, Semifinals	Tokyo, Japan	Decision (Unanimous)	3	3:00
2024-12-08	Win	(Japan) Hiyori Onishi	Krush 169	Tokyo, Japan	Decision (Unanimous)	3	3:00
2024-09-28	Win	(Japan) Riko Kato	Krush 165	Tokyo, Japan	Decision (Unanimous)	3	3:00
2024-08-27	Drax	(Japan) Kiho	Krush 152	Tokyo, Japan	Decision (Split)	3	3:00
2024-06-08	Win	(Japan) Sero	X-FIGHT	Kurashiki, Japan	Decision (Unanimous)	3	3:00
2023-04-08	Win	(Japan) Miho Yata	Krush Ring of Venus	Tokyo, Japan	Decision (Unanimous)	3	3:00
2022-09-26	Win	(Japan) Yoriko Ohara	Kyushu Professional Kickboxing vol.10	Fukuoka, Japan	KO	2	1:48
Legend: Win Loss Draw/No contest Notes

=== Amateur record ===
Amateur Kickboxing Record
Date	Result	Opponent	Event	Location	Method	Round	Time
2022-03-20	Win	(Japan) Yui Araki	RISE Nova Fukuoka	Fukuoka, Japan	KO	2	
2021-10-31	Win	(Japan) Mao Yamasato	King of Strikers	Fukuoka, Japan	Decision	2	2:00
2020-11-01	Loss	(Japan) Kosuke Tanaka	Yamato 20 - Tournament, Semifinals	Fukuoka, Japan	Decision		
2019-12-08	Win	(Japan) Kana Oshikawa	RISE Nova Fukuoka	Fukuoka, Japan	Decision (unanimous)	2	2:00
2019-07-28	Win	(Japan) Kosuke Tanaka	Kaminarimon Fukuoka	Fukuoka, Japan	Decision (majority)	2	2:00
Legend: Win Loss Draw/No contest Notes

== See also ==
- List of female kickboxers
