= Miyuu Sugawara =

Japanese kickboxer

- Born: 菅原 美優; November 22, 1999 (age 26); Itabashi, Tokyo, Japan
- Nationality: Japanese
- Height: 162 cm (5 ft 4 in)
- Weight: 45 kg (99 lb; 7.1 st)
- Style: Karate
- Stance: Orthodox
- Fighting out of: Setagaya, Tokyo, Japan
- Team: K-1 Gym Sangenjaya Silver Wolf
- Years active: 2019-present

Kickboxing record
- Total: 18
- Wins: 14
- By knockout: 1
- Losses: 4
- By knockout: 1

Miyuu Sugawara (Japanese: 菅原 美優, Sugawara Miyuu; born December 22, 1999) is a Japanese kickboxer, who competed in the atomweight divisions of K-1 and Krush, where she was the Krush Atomweight champion and the K-1 Atomweight champion.

== Kickboxing career ==
=== Early career ===
Prior to making her professional debut, Sugawara competed as an amateur, during which time she won the 2017 K-1 All Japan B-Class tournament at 50 kg and the 2018 K-1 All Japan B-Class tournament at 45 kg. This led to her being named the "Amateur Fighter of the Year" at 2018 K-1 awards.

Sugawara made her professional debut against the more experienced, but winless, Satomi Toyoshima at Krush 97 on January 26, 2019. She won the fight by unanimous decision, with two judges scoring the fight 30–26 in her favor, while the third judge awarded her a 29–28 scorecard. Sugawara next faced the 2018 K-1 All Japan Amateur tournament winner Michiko Nobutani, who was making her professional debut, at K-1 KRUSH FIGHT 100 on April 19, 2019. She suffered the first loss and the first stoppage loss of her professional career, as Nobutani won by a third-round knockout.

After suffering her first loss, Sugawara faced the unbeaten Chan Lee at K-1 KRUSH FIGHT 103 on July 21, 2019. She won the fight by majority decision. Two judges scored the fight 30–29 and 30–28 for her, while the third judge scored the bout an even 29–29. Sugawara next faced the one-time Krush Atomweight title challenger Shizuka at K-1 KRUSH FIGHT 109 on December 15, 2019. She won the fight by unanimous decision, with scores of 30–28, 30–27 and 30–28.

=== Krush Atomweight champion ===
==== Krush Atomweight tournament ====
On June 17, 2020, it was announced that a Krush atomweight tournament would be held to crown a new champion, as the title was left vacant after Miho Takanashi moved up in weight. Sugawara faced Yu Fukuhara in the tournament semifinal, while the other bracket pitted Moe Takahashi against Chan Lee. She won the semifinal bout, which was held at Krush 115 on July 21, 2021, by unanimous decision. Two juges scored the bout 30–28 in her favor, while the third judge scored the fight 30–27 for Sugawara.

Sugawara faced Moe Takahashi in the tournament final, which was scheduled as the co-main event of Krush 119 on November 27, 2020. She won the fight by a narrow unanimous decision. Two of the judges scored the fight 30–29 for Sugawara, while the third judge awarded her a 30–28 scorecard. Sugawara was warned for repeated headbutting in the second round, although no points were deducted.

==== Title reign ====
Sugawara made her K-1 debut against the undefeated Nozomi Sigemura at K'Festa 4 Day 1 on March 21, 2021. She won the fight by a dominant unanimous decision, with scores of 30–27, 30–26 and 30–27.

Sugawara faced the four-time Shoot Boxing tournament winner Mio Tsumura at K-1 World GP 2020 in Osaka on May 29, 2021, in her second K-1 appearance. She lost the fight by a close majority decision, with one judge scoring the fight as a 29–29 draw, while the remaining two judges scored it 30–29 for Tsumura. Following the second loss of her professional career, the pair was booked to rematch at Krush 128 on August 21, 2021, with the Krush Atomweight title on the line. Sugawara later withdrew from the bout, due to the COVID-19 protocols, as she came into contact with an infected person. The fight was rescheduled for Krush 131 on November 20, 2021. Sugawara retained her title by unanimous decision, with scores of 30–28, 30–28 and 29–28.

Sugawara made her second title defense against Yu Fukuhara in the co-main event of Krush 134 on February 20, 2022. The bout was a rematch of their July 21, 2020 fight, which Sugawara won by unanimous decision. She won the rematch in the same manner, with scores of 30–29, 30–28 and 30–27.

==== K-1 Atomweight Grand Prix ====
On May 12, 2022, it was announced that a K-1 Atomweight Grand Prix would be held, which would crown the inaugural atomweight champion. Sugawara was booked to face the unbeaten Kira Matsutani, while the other pairing saw Phayahong Ayothayafightgym face Mio Tsumura. The one-day four-women tournament was held at K-1: Ring of Venus on June 25, 2022, at the Yoyogi National Gymnasium in Tokyo, Japan. She won the fight by majority decision, with two judges scoring the fight 30–29 in her favor, while the third judge scored the bout as a 30–30 draw. Sugawara advanced to the tournament finals, where she faced Phayahong Ayothayafightgym. The fight was ruled a majority decision draw following the first three rounds, with two judges scoring the fight 30–30 and 29–29, while the third judge scored it 30–29 for Phayahong. Accordingly, an extension round was fought, after which Phayahong was awarded a split decision.

==== Continued title reign ====
Sugawara made her third Krush Women's Atomweight Championship defense against Chan Lee at Krush 142 on October 28, 2022. The pair previously faced each other at K-1 KRUSH FIGHT 103 on July 21, 2019, with Sugawara winning by majority decision. She won the rematch by a third-round knockout, the first stoppage victory of her professional career. She was later named the October "Fighter of the Month" by eFight.

=== K-1 Atomweight champion ===
Sugawara challenged the K-1 Women's Atomweight champion Phayahong Ayothayafightgym at K-1 World GP 2023: K'Festa 6 on March 12, 2023. The title bout was a rematch of their 2021 K-1 Atomweight Grand Prix finals meeting, which Sugawara lost by split decision, after an extension round was contested. She won the fight by majority decision, with scores of 30–28, 30–28 and 29–29.

Sugawara faced Dimitra Agathangelidou in a non-title bout at K-1 World GP 2023 on July 17, 2023. She won the fight by unanimous decision, with scores of 30–28, 30–28 and 30–29.

Sugawara faced Maria Nella in a non-title bout at K-1 World GP 2023: ReBOOT～K-1 ReBIRTH～ on September 10, 2023. She won the fight by unanimous decision, with two scorecards of 30–28 and one scorecard of 30–27 in her favor.

Sugawara vacated the Krush Women's Atomweight Championship on September 26, 2023.

Sugawara faced Lucille Deadman at K-1 ReBIRTH 2 on December 9, 2023. She won the fight by unanimous decision, with all three judges scoring the fight 30–28 for Sugawara.

Sugawara faced Koyuki Miyazaki (RISE Atomweight champion) in a -45.5 kg catchweight bout at K-1 World MAX 2024 - World Tournament Opening Round on March 20, 2024. The fight was ruled a unanimous decision draw after the first three rounds were contested, with Sugawara losing the unanimous decision after an extra round was fought.

On December 15, 2024, Sugawara vacated her K-1 Women's Atomweight title. She announced to be pursuing a career in boxing.

== Boxing career ==
Sugawara competed in the Kanto Block Qualifying Prefectural Tournament of the 2025 All-Japan Championships in July 2025. As the sole entrant in the light-flyweight division, she qualified automatically for the All-Japan Championships. In October 2025, she competed in the 10th Taiwan Indigenous Boxing Championship, winning the gold medal in the light-flyweight division. On December 23, 2025, she won the All-Japan Amateur Championship in the same weight class.

== Championships and accomplishments ==
=== Amateur ===
- Shin Karate
  - 2016 Shin Karate All Japan K-3 Grand Prix -50 kg Winner
  - 2017 Shin Karate All Japan K-3 Grand Prix -50 kg Winner
- K-1
  - 2017 K-1 Amateur B-Class Qualifying Tournament Winner (-50 kg)
  - 2017 K-1 Amateur All Japan B-Class Challenge Tournament Winner (-50 kg)
  - 2018 K-1 Amateur B-Class Qualifying Tournament Winner (-45 kg)
  - 2018 K-1 Amateur All Japan B-Class Challenge Tournament Winner (-45 kg)

=== Professional ===
- Krush
  - 2020 Krush Women's Atomweight Championship
    - Three successful title defenses
- K-1
  - 2022 K-1 Atomweight Grand Prix Runner-up
  - 2023 K-1 Women's Atomweight champion

=== Awards ===
- K-1
  - 2018 K-1 "Amateur Fighter of the Year"
  - 2021 K-1 "Newcomer of the Year"
  - 2022 Krush "Fighter of the Year"
  - 2023 K-1 Fighting Spirit Award
- eFight.com
  - October 2022 eFight "Fighter of the Month"

== Kickboxing record ==
Professional Kickboxing Record
14 Wins (1 (T)KO's), 4 Losses, 0 Draw, 0 No Contest
Date	Result	Opponent	Event	Location	Method	Round	Time
2024-03-20	Loss	(Japan) Koyuki Miyazaki	K-1 World MAX 2024 - World Tournament Opening Round	Tokyo, Japan	Ext.R Decision (Unanimous)	4	3:00
2023-12-09	Win	(Australia) Lucille Deadman	K-1 ReBIRTH 2	Osaka, Japan	Decision (Unanimous)	3	3:00
2023-09-10	Win	(Greece) Maria Nella	K-1 World GP 2023: ReBOOT～K-1 ReBIRTH～	Yokohama, Japan	Decision (Unanimous)	3	3:00
2023-07-17	Win	(Greece) Dimitra Agathangelidou	K-1 World GP 2023	Tokyo, Japan	Decision (Unanimous)	3	3:00
2023-03-12	Win	(Thailand) Phayahong Ayothayafightgym	K-1 World GP 2023: K'Festa 6	Tokyo, Japan	Decision (Majority)	3	3:00
Wins the K-1 Women's Atomweight Championship.
2022-10-28	Win	(Japan) Chan Lee	Krush 142	Tokyo, Japan	KO (Right straight)	3	2:29
Defends the Krush Women's Atomweight Championship.
2022-06-25	Loss	(Thailand) Phayahong Ayothayafightgym	K-1: Ring of Venus, Tournament Final	Tokyo, Japan	Ext.R Decision (Split)	4	3:00
For the inaugural K-1 Women's Atomweight Championship.
2022-06-25	Win	(Japan) Kira Matsutani	K-1: Ring of Venus, Tournament Semifinal	Tokyo, Japan	Decision (Majority)	3	3:00
2022-02-20	Win	(Japan) Yu	Krush 134	Tokyo, Japan	Decision (Unanimous)	3	3:00
Defends the Krush Women's Atomweight Championship.
2021-11-20	Win	(Japan) MIO	Krush 131	Tokyo, Japan	Decision (Unanimous)	3	3:00
Defends the Krush Women's Atomweight Championship.
2021-05-29	Loss	(Japan) MIO	K-1 World GP 2021: Yokohamatsuri	Yokohama, Japan	Decision (Unanimous)	3	3:00
2021-03-21	Win	(Japan) Nozomi	K'Festa 4 Day 1	Tokyo, Japan	Decision (Unanimous)	3	3:00
2020-11-27	Win	(Japan) MOE	Krush 119, Tournament Finals	Tokyo, Japan	Decision (Unanimous)	3	3:00
Wins the vacant Krush Women's Atomweight Championship.
2020-07-21	Win	(Japan) Yu	Krush 115, Tournament Semifinals	Tokyo, Japan	Decision (Unanimous)	3	3:00
2019-12-15	Win	(Japan) C-ZUKA	K-1 KRUSH FIGHT 109	Tokyo, Japan	Decision (Unanimous)	3	3:00
2019-07-21	Win	(Japan) Chan Lee	K-1 KRUSH FIGHT 103	Tokyo, Japan	Decision (Majority)	3	3:00
2019-04-19	Loss	(Japan) Michiko Nobutani	K-1 KRUSH FIGHT 100	Tokyo, Japan	TKO (Referee stoppage)	3	1:08
2019-01-26	Win	(Japan) Satomi Toyoshima	Krush 97	Tokyo, Japan	Decision (Unanimous)	3	3:00
Legend: Win Loss Draw/No contest Notes

Amateur Kickboxing Record
11 Wins (4 (T)KO's), 0 Losses, 0 Draw, 0 No Contest
Date	Result	Opponent	Event	Location	Method	Round	Time
2018-09-09	Win	(Japan) Miyu Takano	K-1 Amateur 23 - All Japan Selection, Final	Tokyo, Japan	Decision (Unanimous)	1	2:00
2018-09-09	Win	(Japan) Ann Fujii	K-1 Amateur 23 - All Japan Selection, Semifinal	Tokyo, Japan	Decision (Unanimous)	1	2:00
2018-06-10	Win	(Japan) Miyu Wakabayashi	6th K-1 Amateur All Japan Tournament, Final	Tokyo, Japan	TKO		
Won the 2018 K-1 Amateur All Japan B-Class Challenge Tournament (-45 kg) title.
2018-06-10	Win	(Japan) Riko Kato	6th K-1 Amateur All Japan Tournament, Semifinal	Tokyo, Japan	TKO		
2018-02-25	Win	(Japan) Miyu Wakabayashi	K-1 Amateur 20 - All Japan Selection, Final	Tokyo, Japan	Decision	1	2:00
2018-02-25	Win	(Japan) Reika Tsunoda	K-1 Amateur 20 - All Japan Selection, Semifinal	Tokyo, Japan	KO	1	
2017-12-03	Win	(Japan) Koko Shimodaira	5th K-1 Amateur All Japan Tournament, Final	Tokyo, Japan	Decision (Majority)	1	2:00
Won the 2017 K-1 Amateur All Japan B-Class Challenge Tournament (-50 kg) title.
2017-12-03	Win	(Japan) Minori Sasaki	5th K-1 Amateur All Japan Tournament, Semifinal	Tokyo, Japan	Decision (Unanimous)	1	2:00
2017-07-09	Win	(Japan) Koko Shimodaira	K-1 Amateur 18 - All Japan Selection, Final	Tokyo, Japan	Decision (Split)	1	2:00
2017-07-09	Win	(Japan) Reika Tsunoda	K-1 Amateur 18 - All Japan Selection, Semifinal	Tokyo, Japan	Decision (Unanimous)	1	2:00
2017-04-29	Win	(Japan) Yuria Rin	K-1 Amateur 17	Tokyo, Japan	KO	1	
Legend: Win Loss Draw/No contest Notes

== Personal life ==
In 2024, it was announced that she married Seiichiro Ito, a mixed martial artist.

== See also ==
- List of female kickboxers
- List of Krush champions
- List of K-1 champions

Sporting positions
Preceded by Vacant	Krush Women's Atomweight Champion; November 27, 2020–September 26, 2023	Succeeded by Kira Matsutani
Preceded by Phayahong Ayothayafightgym	K-1 Women's Atomweight Champion; March 12, 2023–December 15, 2024	Succeeded by Kira Matsutani
