= Phayahong Ayothayafightgym =

Thai muay thai kickboxer (born 2002)

Phayahong Banchamek
- Born: Jantakarn Manoban (จันทกานต์ มโนบาล); September 30, 2002 (age 24); Buriram province, Thailand
- Other names: Phayahong Sor.Sutthichai (พญาหงส์ ส.สุทธชัย); Phayahong Rongriangkilakorat (พญาหงส์ โรงเรียนกีฬาโคราช); Phayahong Rongriangkilnakhonpathom (พญาหงส์ ร.ร. กีฬานครปฐม) パヤーフォン・アユタヤ・ファイトジム
- Height: 154 cm (5 ft 1 in)
- Weight: 45 kg (99 lb; 7.1 st)
- Style: Muay thai
- Stance: Orthodox
- Fighting out of: Phra Nakhon Si Ayutthaya, Thailand
- Team: Banchamek Gym; Ayothaya Fight Gym

Kickboxing record
- Total: 92
- Wins: 73
- By knockout: 12
- Losses: 18
- Draws: 1

Other information
- University: Kasetsart University
- Notable relatives: Lisa (cousin)

Phayahong Ayothayafightgym
Medal record

Representing Thailand

Women's Muay Thai

IFMA Youth World Muaythai Championships
Gold medal – first place	2018 Bangkok	45 kg
Gold medal – first place	2019 Antalya	45 kg

Women's Wushu

Southeast Asian Games
Bronze medal – third place	2021 Hanoi	48 kg

Phayahong Banchamek (Thai: พญาหงส์ อโยธยาไฟท์ยิม) is a Thai muay thai kickboxer. She is a former K-1 Women's Atomweight champion and a Rajadamnern Stadium Minimumweight title

As of July 2022, she is ranked as the eight best female pound for pound kickboxer in the world according to Combat Press.

== Career ==
=== Muay Thai ===
Phayahong started training in Muay Thai at the age of 9 years old in order to help her family. She had her first fights for the Sor.Sutthichai camp in the Buriram province and gained her first regional title at the age of 13.

On February 25, 2018 Phayahong faced COMACHI at KODO 3 for the interim WPMF World Pinweight title. She won the fight by unanimous decision. They rematched on February 24, 2019 at KODO 4 in Japan for the undisputed WPMF World Pinweight title. Phayahong won the fight by unanimous decision.

On March 28, 2021 Phayahong faced Faachiangrai Sor.Saenchai in Nakhon Ratchasima for the Thailand 102 lbs belt. She won the fight by decision to capture the title.

Phayahong faced Lookmee P.K.Viengchan at Legends Fighting Championships on September 3, 2022. She won the fight by a second-round technical knockout. Phayahong made her next appearance with Legends Fight Championship on November 20, 2022, as she was booked to face Margaret Wanek. She won the fight by decision.

In 2024, as a fighter from Banchamek Gym, she participated twice in the Japanese edition of 'RWS.' In her first match, she lost to Japanese fighter Saya Ito, but she won her second match by unanimous decision against another Japanese fighter, Kana. In her next fight, Phayahong won by knockout against Nongparnfah at the famous Rajadamnern Stadium during the 'All Star Fight' event.

On October 19, 2024, Payahong defeats Saya Ito by unanimous decision, becoming the first-ever Rajadamnern Stadium Female Minimumweight Champion.

On December 28, 2024, Phayahong Banchamek successfully defends the Rajadamnern Stadium Female Minimumweight Championship by defeating Thailand’s Kaosuay Por.Kobkua via unanimous decision at the RWS promotion event.

=== Kickboxing career ===
Phayahong challenged the Krush Women's Atomweight champion Miho Takanashi in her promotional debut at Krush 106 on October 13, 2019. She lost the fight by unanimous decision.

Phayahong faced Moe Takahashi at Krush 111 on February 24, 2020, in her second appearance with the organization. She won the fight by unanimous decision.

On May 12, 2022, K-1 announced that they would be holding an atomweight Grand Prix, which would crown the inaugural champion, at the all-female kickboxing card at K-1: Ring of Venus on June 25, 2022. Phayahong faced the four-time Shoot Boxing tournament winner Mio Tsumura in the tournament quarterfinals, which she won by unanimous decision. Phayahong advanced to the tournament finals, where she faced the reigning Krush Atomweight champion Miyuu Sugawara. The fight was ruled a majority decision draw after the first three rounds, with one judge scoring the bout for Phayahong. She was awarded the split decision after an extra fourth round was fought.

Phayahong made her first K-1 Women's Atomweight title defense against Miyuu Sugawara at K-1 World GP 2023: K'Festa 6 on March 12, 2023. It was an immediate rematch of their 2021 K-1 Grand Prix finals bout, which Phayahong won by split decision. She lost the fight by majority decision.

Phayahong faced Kira Matsutani at K-1 World GP 2023 on July 17, 2023. She lost the fight by unanimous decision, after an extra fourth round was contested.

Phayahong won five gold medals in amateur kickboxing at WAKO-sanctioned competitions across multiple categories between 2023 and 2024.

=== Rajadamnern World Series ===
Phayahong faced Saya Ito for the inaugural Rajadamnern Stadium Women's Minimumweight (105 lbs) title on 19 October 2024. She won the fight by unanimous decision.

Phayahong was scheduled to defend her Rajadamnern Stadium Women's Minimumweight (105 lbs) title against Mongkutpetch KhaolakMuaythai at a Rajadamnern World Series event on April 5, 2025. She lost the fight by unanimous decision.

=== Amateur boxing career ===
On 25 September 2026, Phayahong won the gold medal in the women's 51 kg division at the 2026 Thailand National Amateur Boxing Championships, defeating Apec Butdee by unanimous decision, 5–0.

== Championships and accomplishments ==
=== Kickboxing ===
- K-1
  - 2022 K-1 Women's Atomweight Champion
- World Association of Kickboxing Organizations
  - 2026 WAKO Thailand Kickboxing Championship Point Fighting Team (gold)
  - 2026 WAKO Thailand Kickboxing Championship Kick Light -50 kg (gold)
  - 2026 WAKO 2nd Thailand Kickboxing World Cup Kick Light -50 kg (gold)
  - 2026 Inthanin Games (51st Thailand University Games) Kick Light -50 kg (gold)
  - 2025 SEA Games Kickboxing Low Kick -48 kg (silver)
  - 2025 WAKO World Championship Low Kick -48 kg (bronze)
  - 2025 WAKO Hungarian Kickboxing World Cup Low Kick -48 kg (gold)
  - 2025 WAKO 1st Thailand Kickboxing World Cup Low Kick -48 kg (gold)
  - 2024 WAKO Uzbekistan World Cup Low Kick -48 kg (gold)
  - 2024 WAKO Hungarian Kickboxing World Cup Low Kick -48 kg (gold)
  - 2024 Thailand Championships Full Contact -48 kg (gold)
  - 2023 Thailand Championships Light Contact -50 kg (gold)
  - 2023 Thailand Championships Kick Light -50 kg (gold)

=== Muay Thai ===
- World Professional Muaythai Federation
  - 2018 interim WPMF World Pinweight Champion
  - 2019 WPMF World Pinweight Champion
- Professional Boxing Association of Thailand (PAT)
  - 2021 Thailand 102 lbs Champion
- Rajadamnern Stadium
  - 2024 Rajadamnern Stadium Minimumweight (105 lbs) Champion
    - One successful title defense
- International Federation of Muaythai Associations
  - 2018 I.F.M.A. Youth (14-15) World Championships -45 kg (gold)
  - 2019 I.F.M.A. Youth (16-17) World Championships -45 kg (gold)
  - 2026 I.F.M.A. Senior World Championship, Senior Female Elite -48 kg (gold)

=== Boxing ===
- Amateur boxing
  - 2026 Thailand National Amateur Boxing Championships -51 kg (gold)

== Fight record ==
Professional Muay Thai & Kickboxing Record
73 Wins (12 (T)KO's), 18 Losses, 1 Draw, 0 No Contests
Date	Result	Opponent	Event	Location	Method	Round	Time
2026-12-30		(Japan) Arina Kobayashi	KNOCK OUT.71 ～K.O CLIMAX 2026～	Tokyo, Japan			
For the KNOCK OUT Red Light Flyweight (-49 kg) title.
2026-11-08	Win	(Japan) Mina Hayashi	RISE 203	Tokyo, Japan	KO (Right hook)	3	2:43
2026-07-04	Win	(Brazil) Ana Carolina Accetti	Rajadamnern World Series	Bangkok, Thailand	Decision (Unanimous)	3	3:00
2026-04-26	Win	(Japan) Mei Miyamoto	RISE 197	Tokyo, Japan	Decision (Unanimous)	3	3:00
2025-08-16	Win	(Morocco) Romaysa Rhouni	Rajadamnern World Series	Bangkok, Thailand	TKO (shoudler injury)	1	1:38
2025-04-05	Loss	(Thailand) Mongkutpetch KhaolakMuaythai	Rajadamnern World Series	Bangkok, Thailand	Decision (Unanimous)	5	2:00
Loses the Rajadamnern Stadium Women's Minimumweight (105 lbs) title.
2024-12-28	Win	(Thailand) Kaosuay Por.Kobkua	Rajadamnern World Series	Bangkok, Thailand	Decision (Unanimous)	5	2:00
Defends the Rajadamnern Stadium Women's Minimumweight (105 lbs) title.
2024-10-19	Win	(Japan) Saya Ito	Rajadamnern World Series	Bangkok, Thailand	Decision (Unanimous)	5	2:00
Wins the inaugural Rajadamnern Stadium Women's Minimumweight (105 lbs) title.
2024-08-26	Win	(Thailand) Nongparnfah FamilyMuayThai	ALL STAR FIGHT	Bangkok, Thailand	KO (High kick)	3	1:38
2024-07-14	Win	(Japan) Kana	Rajadamnern World Series Japan	Chiba, Japan	Decision (Unanimous)	3	3:00
2024-04-14	Loss	(Japan) Saya Ito	Rajadamnern World Series Japan	Chiba, Japan	Decision (Unanimous)	3	3:00
2023-07-17	Loss	(Japan) Kira Matsutani	K-1 World GP 2023	Tokyo, Japan	Ext.R Decision (Unanimous)	4	3:00
2023-03-12	Loss	(Japan) Miyuu Sugawara	K-1 World GP 2023: K'Festa 6	Tokyo, Japan	Decision (Majority)	3	3:00
Loses the K-1 Women's Atomweight Championship.
2022-11-20	Win	(United States) Margaret Wanek	Legends Fighting Championships	Phuket, Thailand	Decision	3	3:00
2022-09-03	Win	(Laos) Lookmee P.K.Viengchan	Legends Fighting Championships	Nakhon Ratchasima, Thailand	TKO (Punches)	2	1:08
2022-06-25	Win	(Japan) Miyuu Sugawara	K-1: Ring of Venus, Atomweight World Grand Prix Final	Tokyo, Japan	Ext.R Decision (Split)	4	3:00
Wins the inaugural K-1 Women's Atomweight Championship.
2022-06-25	Win	(Japan) MIO	K-1: Ring of Venus, Atomweight World Grand Prix Semifinal	Tokyo, Japan	Decision (Unanimous)	3	3:00
2022-02-05	Loss	(Australia) Celest Hansen	Muay Hardcore	Bangkok, Thailand	Decision (Unanimous)	3	3:00
2021-03-28	Win	(Thailand) Faachiangrai Sor.Saenchai	Lady Fighter	Nakhon Ratchasima, Thailand	Decision	5	2:00
Wins Thailand 102 lbs title.
2020-10-10	Win	(Japan) Ayaka Miyauchi	Muay Hardcore	Bangkok, Thailand	Decision (Unanimous)	3	3:00
2020-02-24	Win	(Japan) MOE	Krush 111	Tokyo, Japan	Decision (Unanimous)	3	3:00
2019-10-13	Loss	(Japan) Miho Takanashi	Krush 106	Tokyo, Japan	Decision (Unanimous)	3	3:00
For the Krush Women's Atomweight Championship.
2019-02-24	Win	(Japan) COMACHI	KODO 4	Oita, Japan	Decision (Unanimous)	5	2:00
Wins the undisputed WPMF World Pinweight title.
2018-02-25	Win	(Japan) COMACHI	KODO 3	Oita, Japan	Decision (Unanimous)	5	2:00
Wins the interim WPMF World Pinweight title.
2017-11-26	Draw	(Japan) Ayaka Miyauchi	M-ONE 2017 FINAL	Tokyo, Japan	Decision (Split)	3	3:00
Legend: Win Loss Draw/No contest Notes

Amateur Kickboxing and Muay Thai Record
Date	Result	Opponent	Event	Location	Method	Round	Time
2026-09-10	Win	(Kazakhstan) Dayana Duisengali	2026 IFMA Senior World Championship, Finals	Deçan, Kosovo	10 - 9	1	
Wins 2026 IFMA Senior World Championship Female Elite -48kg Gold Medal.
2026-08-09	Win	(Thailand) Wandee Srinongkhot	WAKO Thailand Kickboxing Championship 2026, Finals	Bangkok, Thailand			
Wins 2026 WAKO Thailand Kickboxing Championship Kick Light -50 kg Gold Medal.
2026-04-11	Win	(Vietnam) Hoang thi Thuy Giang	WAKO 2nd Thailand Kickboxing World Cup, Finals	Bangkok, Thailand			
Wins 2026 WAKO Thailand Kickboxing World Cup Kick Light -50 kg Gold Medal.
2025-12-16	Loss	(Philippines) Zyra Bon-asz	SEA GAMES Thailand 2025, Finals	Bang Sao Thong, Samut Prakan, Thailand	Decision	3	2:00
Wins 2025 SEA GAMES Low Kick -48kg Silver Medal.
2025-12-15	Win	(Indonesia) Sevi Nurul Aini	SEA GAMES Thailand 2025, Semifianls	Bang Sao Thong, Samut Prakan, Thailand	Decision (3:0)	3	2:00
2025-11-27	Loss	(Turkey) Özlem Korkmaz	WAKO Senior World Championships 2025, Semifianls	Abu Dhabi, United Arab Emirates	Decision (2:1)	3	2:00
Wins 2025 WAKO World Chamlpionship Low Kick -48kg Bronze Medal.
2025-11-26	Win	(Spain) Judith Carricondo	WAKO Senior World Championships 2025, Quarterfinals	Abu Dhabi, United Arab Emirates	Decision (3:0)	3	2:00
2025-06-15	Win	(Poland) Emilia Lizak	WAKO 30th Hungarian Kickboxing World Cup	Budapest, Hungary			
Wins 2025 WAKO Hungarian Kickboxing World Cup Low Kick -48kg Gold Medal.
2025-04-10	Win	(Vietnam) Thi Yen Nhi Bui	WAKO 1st Thailand Kickboxing World Cup	Thailand	Decision (3:0)	3	2:00
Wins 2025 WAKO Thailand Kickboxing World Cup Low Kick -48kg Gold Medal.
2024-06-16	Win	(Spain) Judith Carricondo	WAKO 29th Hungarian Kickboxing World Cup, Final	Budapest, Hungary	Decision (3:0)	3	2:00
Wins 2024 WAKO Hungarian Kickboxing World Cup Low Kick -48kg Gold Medal.
2024-06-15	Win	(Poland) Julia Wask	WAKO 29th Hungarian Kickboxing World Cup, Semifinals	Budapest, Hungary	Decision (3:0)	3	2:00
2019-10-05	Win	(Iran) Roghayeh Mohammadiyan	2019 IFMA Youth World Championships, Final	Antalya, Turkey	Decision (30:29)		
Wins 2019 IFMA Youth (16-17) World Championships -45kg Gold Medal.
2019-10-04	Win	(United Kingdom) Charlie Pritchard	2019 IFMA Youth World Championships, Semi Final	Antalya, Turkey	Decision (30:27)		
2019-10-02	Win	(Turkey) Sİnem Karakaya	2019 IFMA Youth World Championships, Quarter Final	Antalya, Turkey	Decision (30:26)		
2018-08-08	Win	(Belarus) Aliaksandra Malchanka	2018 IFMA Youth World Championships, Final	Bangkok, Thailand	TKO (Referee stoppage)	1	
Wins 2018 IFMA Youth (14-15) World Championships -45kg Gold Medal.
2018-08-07	Win		2018 IFMA Youth World Championships, Semi Final	Bangkok, Thailand	TKO	1	
Legend: Win Loss Draw/No contest Notes

== See also ==
- List of female kickboxers
- List of K-1 champions
