= Miho Takanashi =

Japanese kickboxer

- Born: 高梨 美穂; May 26, 1993 (age 33); Ōta, Tokyo, Japan
- Other names: Knuckle
- Height: 158 cm (5 ft 2 in)
- Weight: 48 kg (106 lb; 7.6 st)
- Division: Minimumweight
- Style: Kickboxing
- Fighting out of: Ōta, Tokyo, Japan
- Team: K-1 Gym Gotanda Team Kings (2023-Present); Y’ZD GYM (2018-2023)
- Years active: 2018 - present

Kickboxing record
- Total: 14
- Wins: 13
- By knockout: 2
- Losses: 1

Other information
- Website: https://www.miho-takanashi.com/

Miho Takanashi (born 26 May 1993) is a Japanese kickboxer, currently fighting in the minimumweight division of K-1, where she is the former Krush Atomweight champion.

As of June 2021, she is the #10 ranked pound for pound female kickboxer in the world, according to Combat Press.

== Kickboxing career ==
=== Early career ===
Takanashi made her professional debut against Hyo Sun Kim at Max FC 13: In Iksan, on April 21, 2018. She won the fight by unanimous decision.

Takanashi was scheduled to make her professional debut against Yu Fukuhara at KHAOS 6. The fight was marked by Takahashi's volume and pressure, which seemed to overwhelm Fukuhara from the very beginning of the fight. The fight ended by a third-round knockout, after Takanashi countered Fukuhara's front kick with a right hook. She poured on punches on her staggered opponent, forcing the referee to stop the bout.

After her debut victory, it was announced that Takanashi would challenge the reigning Krush Atomweight champion Emi Matsushita. However, Matsushita refused to fight Takanashi, stating that a rookie in the organization shouldn't be entitled to title shot so soon. Accordingly, Matsushita was stripped of the title.

Takanashi was scheduled to fight Moe Takahashi at Krush 96. Although Takanashi had more professional experience, Moe came into the fight with a richer amateur career, having won the K-1 Challenge Women's B Class tournament at atomweight. Despite a slow start, Takanashi improved as the fight went on and scored a knockdown with a right straight in the second round. Takanashi won the fight by unanimous decision, with scores of 30–28, 29-28 and 30–27.

=== Krush Atomweight champion ===
Takanashi was scheduled to fight the former NJKF Minerva atomweight champion Shizuka for the vacant Krush Women's Atomweight title at Krush 101. Takanashi implemented her patented pressuring style, pushing Shizuka back from the beginning of the bout. At the very end of the second round, Takanashi knocked Shizuka down with a series of punches. Midway through the third round, Takanashi once again pressured Shizuka into the ring corner, and landed repeated punches. Shizuka's corner decided to throw in the towel, awarding Takanashi a technical knockout victory. It was the fastest title win in Krush history, as Takanashi won the title after just three appearances with K-1.

Takanashi was scheduled to make her first title defense against Phayahong Ayothayafightgym at Krush 106. The fight was ruled a majority draw after the first two rounds, with two of the judges scoring the fight 29-29, while the third judge scored the fight 30-28 for Takanashi. The fight went into an extension round, after which Takanashi won the fight by unanimous decision.

Miho vacated the title on June 6, 2020, after moving up to minimumweight.

=== K-1 Minimumweight career ===
For her first fight at minimumweight, Takanashi was scheduled to fight Masami at Krush 113. Takanashi won the fight by unanimous decision, with all three judges awarding him all three rounds, with scores of 30−27, 30−27 and 30−26. During the post-fight interview, Takanashi called for a fight with Mio Tsumura.

Takanashi was scheduled to fight Mio Tsumura at K-1 World GP 2020 in Osaka. Takanashi defeated the former Shootboxing champion by unanimous decision, with scores of 28–30, 29-30 and 28–30.

Takanashi was scheduled to fight MARI at K-1 World GP 2021: K’Festa 4 Day.2. The undefeated Takanashi was an overwhelming favorite against MARI, who came into the fight on a seven-fight losing streak. The closely contested fight was ruled a draw after the first three rounds and went into an extension round. Takanashi won the fight by split decision.

The close nature of their first bout prompted K-1 to scheduled a rematch between Takanashi and MARI at K-1 World GP 2021 in Fukuoka on July 17, 2021. She won the fight by unanimous decision, with scores of 29–28, 30-28 and 30–29.

Takanashi was scheduled to face Mirei at K-1 World GP 2021 Japan on December 4, 2021. She won the fight by unanimous decision.

Takanashi was booked to face Yuko at K-1 World GP 2022 Japan on February 27, 2022. She won the fight by majority decision.

Takanashi faced Erivan Barut at K-1: Ring of Venus on June 25, 2022. She suffered her first professional loss, as Barut won the fight by unanimous decision.

Takanashi faced MOE at Krush 170 on January 26, 2025, following about 2 and a half years-long absence from professional competition. She won the fight by split decision.

== Championships and accomplishments ==
- K-1
  - Krush Women's Atomweight Championship (One time, former)
    - One successful title defense
  - 2019 K-1 "Newcomer of the Year" Award

== Fight record ==
Professional Kickboxing Record
13 Wins (2 (T)KO's), 1 Loss, 0 Draw, 0 No Contest
Date	Result	Opponent	Event	Location	Method	Round	Time	Record
2026-08-30	Win	(Japan) Hiyori Onishi	Krush 191	Tokyo, Japan	Decision (Unanimous)	3	3:00	13–1
2025-01-26	Win	(Japan) MOE	Krush 170	Tokyo, Japan	Decision (Split)	3	3:00	12–1
2022-06-25	Loss	(Turkey) Erivan Barut	K-1: Ring of Venus	Tokyo, Japan	Decision (Unanimous)	3	3:00	11–1
2022-02-27	Win	(Japan) Yuko	K-1 World GP 2022 Japan	Tokyo, Japan	Decision (Majority)	3	3:00	11–0
2021-12-04	Win	(Japan) Mirei	K-1 World GP 2021 in Osaka	Osaka, Japan	Decision (Unanimous)	3	3:00	10–0
2021-07-17	Win	(Japan) MARI	K-1 World GP 2021 in Fukuoka	Fukuoka, Japan	Decision (Unanimous)	3	3:00	9–0
2021-03-27	Win	(Japan) MARI	K-1 World GP 2021: K’Festa 4 Day.2	Yoyogi, Japan	Decision (Split)	3	3:00	8–0
2020-09-22	Win	(Japan) Mio Tsumura	K-1 World GP 2020 in Osaka	Osaka, Japan	Decision (Unanimous)	3	3:00	7–0
2020-06-28	Win	(Japan) Masami	Krush 113	Tokyo, Japan	Decision (Unanimous)	3	3:00	6–0
2019-10-13	Win	(Thailand) Phayahong Ayothayafightgym	Krush 106	Tokyo, Japan	Ext.R Decision (Unanimous)	4	3:00	5–0
Defends the Krush Atomweight Championship.
2019-05-18	Win	(Japan) Shizuka	Krush 101	Tokyo, Japan	TKO (Punches)	3	1:34	4–0
Wins the vacant Krush Atomweight Championship.
2018-12-16	Win	(Japan) Moe Takahashi	Krush 96	Tokyo, Japan	Decision (Unanimous)	3	3:00	3–0
2018-09-01	Win	(Japan) Yu Fukuhara	KHAOS 6	Tokyo, Japan	TKO (Punches)	3	1:37	2–0
2018-04-21	Win	(South Korea) Hyo Sun Kim	Max FC 13: In Iksan	Iksan, South Korea	Decision (Unanimous)	3	2:00	1–0
Legend: Win Loss Draw/No contest Notes

Amateur Kickboxing Record
Date	Result	Opponent	Event	Location	Method	Round	Time
2016-07-31	Win	(Japan) Mari Kamikariya	2016 K-1 Challenge B-Class, Tournament Final	Tokyo, Japan	Decision (Unanimous)	3	2:00
Wins the K-1 Challenge B-Class -50kg Tournament title.
2016-07-31	Win	(Japan) Yuuri Kojima	2016 K-1 Challenge B-Class, Tournament Final	Tokyo, Japan	KO		
Legend: Win Loss Draw/No contest Notes

== See also ==
- List of Krush champions
- List of female kickboxers

Sporting positions
Preceded by Vacant	Krush Women's Atomweight Champion; May 18, 2019–June 6, 2020	Succeeded by Miyuu Sugawara
