= Ayaka Miyauchi =

Japanese kickboxer

- Born: 宮内彩香; 14 June 1983 (age 43); Taitō, Tokyo, Japan
- Other names: "Little Tiger"
- Nationality: Japanese
- Height: 1.57 m (5 ft 2 in)
- Weight: 52.2 kg (115 lb; 8 st 3 lb)
- Division: Strawweight
- Style: Kickboxing, Muay Thai
- Fighting out of: Bangkok, Thailand
- Team: Team Thai-Yo
- Years active: 2007-present

Kickboxing record
- Total: 61
- Wins: 35
- By knockout: 10
- Losses: 21
- Draws: 5

Ayaka Miyauchi (born 14 June 1983) is a Japanese Nak Muay and kickboxer. She is the current WPMF World Pinweight champion.

She is the former WPMF Japanese Mini Flyweight champion, the former WMC World Mini Flyweight and Pinweight champion, the Patong Stadium and J-Girls champion and the WBC Muaythai Interim Mini Flyweight Champion.

She is currently signed with ONE Championship and is competing in their Super Series events.

== Martial arts career ==
Miyauchi made her professional debut in 2007 during the 2007 CUB☆KICK'S-8 against Tomoko Kurimitsu, when she won a unanimous decision.

In 2008 she entered the J-Girls World Queen Tournament. In the opening round, she defeated Mai, but subsequently lost to Mayumi in the second round of the tournament.

In 2009 Miyauchi entered the J-Girls Challengers Tournament. In the quarter-finals she defeated Yuka Okamura, and in the semi-final bout won the rematch with Mayumi. She would be stopped in the finals by Erika Kamimura.

Later in the year, she entered the J-Girls Founders Tournament, which she managed to win with unanimous decision victories over Marie Nakanaka, Mai and Junko Yamada.

Little Tiger participated in ONE Championship's Warrior Series, facing Sandra Godvik during Warrior Series 8. Miyauchi lost her debut with the organization by a unanimous decision.

In her next fight with ONE Championship Miyauchi fought Marie Ruumet. Ruumet kept her at distance with a combination of low and middle kicks, as well as through straight punches, leading Rummet to a unanimous decision win.

== Championships and accomplishments ==
- J-GIRLS
  - 2009 J-GIRLS Atomweight Championship
- World Professional Muaythai Federation
  - 2011 WPMF Japanese Mini Flyweight Championship
    - One successful title defense
  - 2013 WPMF World Mini Flyweight Championship
    - One successful title defense
  - 2016 WPMF World Pinweight Championship
- World Muaythai Council
  - 2014 WMC World Mini Flyweight Championship
- Patong Stadium
  - 2013 Patong Boxing Stadium Flyweight Championship
- World Boxing Council Muaythai
  - 2014 WBC Interim Mini Flyweight Championship

== Fight record ==
Professional Kickboxing Record
35 Wins (10 (T)KO's), 21 Losses, 5 Draw, 0 No Contest
Date	Result	Opponent	Event	Location	Method	Round	Time
2020-10-10	Loss	(Thailand) Phayahong Ayothayafightgym	Muay Hardcore	Thailand	Decision	3	3:00
2020-08-21	Loss	(Estonia) Marie Ruumet	ONE Championship: No Surrender 3	Bangkok, Thailand	Decision (Unanimous)	3	3:00
2019-10-05	Loss	(Sweden) Sandra Godvik	ONE Warrior Series 8	Tokyo, Japan	Decision (Unanimous)	3	3:00
2018-10-21	Loss	(Japan) Eguchi Comachi	M-ONE 2018 Final	Tokyo, Japan	Decision (Unanimous)	3	3:00
2017-11-26	Draw	(Thailand) Phayahong RiangkilaKorat	M-ONE 2017 FINAL	Tokyo, Japan	Decision (Split)	3	3:00
2017-09-18	Win	(Thailand) Yodin Sityodin	M-ONE 2017 2nd	Tokyo, Japan	TKO	2	1:09
2017-05-28	Loss	(Japan) Koto Hiraoka	Krush 76	Tokyo, Japan	Decision (Unanimous)	3	3:00
2017-03-20	Win	(Thailand) Saomangkon Polamaipaka	M-ONE 2017 1st	Tokyo, Japan	Decision (Unanimous)	3	3:00
2016-11-23	Win	(Thailand) Anan Sit Changseen	`M-ONE 2016 FINAL	Tokyo, Japan	TKO	1	1:35
2016-09-25	Win	(Japan) Eguchi Comachi	`M-ONE 2016 3rd	Tokyo, Japan	Decision (Unanimous)	5	3:00
Wins the WPMF World Pinweight title.
2016-06-19	Win	(Japan) MARI	M-ONE 2016 vol.2	Tokyo, Japan	Decision (Unanimous)	3	3:00
2016-03-21	Loss	(Japan) Saya Ito	M-ONE	Tokyo, Japan	Decision (Majority)	5	2:00
For the WPMF World Mini Flyweight title.
2016-01-17	Loss	(Taiwan) Kill Bee	Krush 62	Tokyo, Japan	Decision (Unanimous)	3	3:00
2015-09-27	Loss	(Japan) Saya Ito	Suk Weerasakreck 10	Tokyo, Japan	Decision (Majority)	5	2:00
Loses the WPMF World Mini Flyweight title.
2015-08-11	Loss	(Thailand) Poonsayam	King's Birthday Celebration	Bangkok, Thailand	Decision (Majority)	3	3:00
2015-06-14	Win	(Thailand) Nong Cake LonLianGilaKonkaen	Suk Weerasakreck 9	Tokyo, Japan	Decision (Majority)	5	3:00
2015-03-22	Win	(Thailand) Nonpaew Por Pitakuchai	WPMF JAPAN × REBELS SUK WEERASAKRECK FAIRTEX	Tokyo, Japan	KO	4	1:45
2014-11-09	Win	(Thailand) MuangTongyu Sohenjarung	Suk Weerasakreck 8	Tokyo, Japan	KO	3	1:03
2014-09-21	Win	(Thailand) Pettanya Mor Krungtep	?	Tokyo, Japan	TKO	4	
Defends the WPMF World Mini Flyweight title.
2014-07-26	Win	(Thailand) Faachiangrai Sor. Sakunthong	WBC Championship	Pattaya, Thailand	Decision (Split)	5	2:00
Wins the WBC Interim Mini Flyweight title.
2014-06-15	Win	(Thailand) HorKhao SorsaYarn	Suk Weerasakreck 6	Tokyo, Japan	Decision (Unanimous)	3	3:00
2014-03-30	Win	(Thailand) Pokeo Tonyom Su	Suk Weerasakreck 5 Part 2	Tokyo, Japan	TKO	2	0:50
Wins the WMC World Mini Flyweight title.
2013-11-17	Win	(Thailand) Pewary Mor Krungthep Thongburi	Suk Weerasakreck 4 Part 2	Tokyo, Japan	KO	1	0:45
2013-10-23	Loss	(Thailand) Tep Sor Sortip Jarun	Suk Weerasakreck 4 Part 2	Sing Buri Province, Thailand	Decision (Unanimous)	5	2:00
For the WMC World Mini Flyweight title.
2013-09-15	Win	(Thailand) Tep Sor Sortip Jarun	Suk Weerasakreck 3 Part 2	Tokyo, Japan	Decision (Unanimous)	5	2:00
Wins the WPMF World Mini Flyweight title.
2013-06-16	Loss	(Thailand) Yoozin Sittmuesayam	Suk Weerasakreck 2 Part 1	Tokyo, Japan	Decision (Unanimous)	5	2:00
For the WPMF Interim Mini Flyweight title.
2013-04-14	Draw	(Italy) Soissy Porchetta	M-FIGHT BOM I ~The Battle of Muaythai~	Tokyo, Japan	Decision (Unanimous)	5	3:00
2013-03-17	Draw	(Thailand) Payak Muezayam	Ayutthaya Boxing Stadium	Thailand	Decision (Unanimous)	5	2:00
For the WPMF Interim Mini Flyweight title.
2013-02-14	Win	(United Kingdom) Christie	Patong Stadium	Phuket, Thailand	TKO	3	
Wins the Patong Stadium 112 lbs title.
2012-12-07	Win	(Thailand) Benafer	Patong Stadium	Sing Buri Province	TKO	2	
2012-11-11	Loss	(Japan) Chiharu	M-1 Sutt Yod Muaythai vol.4	Tokyo, Japan	Decision (Unanimous)	5	2:00
For the WPMF World Mini Flyweight title.
2012-09-09	Win	(Thailand) Jaupachala Motor Sanai	M-1 Muay Thai Challenge Sutt Yod Muaythai vol.3	Tokyo, Japan	KO	4	2:00
2012-06-24	Win	(Thailand) Teacher Go. Addison	M-1 Muay Thai Challenge Sutt Yod Muaythai vol.2	Tokyo, Japan	Decision (Unanimous)	5	2:00
2012-04-15	Win	(Japan) Hyakuhana	Rebels 11	Tokyo, Japan	Decision (Unanimous)	3	3:00
2012-01-22	Win	(Japan) Nao Iida	Rebels 10	Tokyo, Japan	Decision (Majority)	5	3:00
Defends the WPMF Japan Mini Flyweight title.
2011-12-22	Win	(Japan) Momi	2011 Fujiwara Festival -Winter Team-	Tokyo, Japan	Ext.R Decision (Unanimous)	4	3:00
2011-08-28	Loss	(Japan) Chiharu	2011 Fujiwara Festival-Summer Team	Tokyo, Japan	Decision (Unanimous)	5	3:00
For the WPMF World Mini Flyweight title.
2011-06-12	Win	(Thailand) Minma Sit Nom Noi	M-1 FAIRTEX Muay Thai Challenge “Ganbaro Nippon! RAORAK MUAY vol.2	Tokyo, Japan	KO	4	0:25
2011-04-12	Loss	(Thailand) Teacher Go. Addison	Rangsit Stadium	Rangsit, Thailand	Decision (Unanimous)	5	2:00
For the WMC World Mini Flyweight title.
2011-01-23	Win	(Japan) Junko Yamada	REBELS.6	Tokyo, Japan	Decision (Unanimous)	5	2:00
Wins the WPMF Japan Mini Flyweight title.
2010-12-12	Loss	(Japan) Mako Yamada	J-GIRLS Women's Festival 2010- "The fighting woman is beautiful"	Tokyo, Japan	Decision (Unanimous)	5	2:00
2010-09-20	Win	(Japan) Yukari Sakamoto	J-GIRLS Catch The stone〜10	Tokyo, Japan	Decision (Unanimous)	4	3:00
2010-07-19	Draw	(Japan) Hisae Watanabe	REBELS 3	Tokyo, Japan	Draw (Split)	3	3:00
For the WPMF Japan Mini Flyweight title.
2010-05-30	Win	(Japan) Nong Bua Luke Peary	J-GIRLS Catch The stone〜8	Tokyo, Japan	Decision (Unanimous)	3	2:00
2009-12-20	Win	(Japan) Junko Yamada	J-GIRLS Final Stage 2009	Tokyo, Japan	Decision (Unanimous)	3	2:00
J-Girls Founders Tournament Finals.
2009-09-27	Win	(Japan) Mai	J-GIRLS Catch The stone〜4	Tokyo, Japan	Decision (Unanimous)	3	2:00
J-Girls Founders Tournament Semi-finals.
2009-09-27	Win	(Japan) Marie Nakanaka	J-GIRLS Catch The stone〜4	Tokyo, Japan	Decision (Unanimous)	3	2:00
J-Girls Founders Tournament Quarter-finals.
2009-07-26	Loss	(Japan) Junko Yamada	J-GIRLS Champion Festival 2009	Tokyo, Japan	Decision (Unanimous)	3	2:00
2009-05-31	Loss	(Japan) Miho	J-GIRLS Catch The stone〜3	Tokyo, Japan	Decision (Unanimous)	3	2:00
2009-04-05	Loss	(Japan) Erika Kamimura	J-GIRLS: Catch the Stone 2 - Challengers Tournament Finals	Tokyo, Japan	Decision (Unanimous)	3	3:00
For the J-Girls Challengers Tournament title.
2009-01-18	Win	(Japan) Mayumi	J-GIRLS Catch The stone〜1 - Challengers Tournament Semi-finals	Tokyo, Japan	Decision (Unanimous)	3	2:00
2008-11-09	Win	(Japan) Yuka Okamura	J-GIRLS Final Stage 2008 - Challengers Tournament Quarter-finals	Tokyo, Japan	Decision (Unanimous)	3	2:00
2008-07-21	Draw	(Japan) Miho	J-GIRLS Summer Kick Carnival	Tokyo, Japan	Draw (Split)	3	3:00
2008-05-25	Loss	(Japan) Mayumi	J-GIRLS World Queen Tournament 2008 - 2nd round	Tokyo, Japan	Decision (Unanimous)	3	2:00
2008-03-02	Win	(Japan) Mai	J-GIRLS World Queen Tournament 2008 - 1st round	Tokyo, Japan	Decision (Unanimous)	3	2:00
2007-12-07	Loss	(Japan) Chiharu	All Japan Kick Fujiwara Festival -Fujiwara Festival 2007	Tokyo, Japan	Decision (Unanimous)	3	2:00
2007-10-6	Win	(Japan) Tomoko Kurimitsu	CUB☆KICK'S-8	Tokyo, Japan	Decision (Unanimous)	3	2:00
Legend: Win Loss Draw/No contest Notes

== See also ==
- List of female kickboxers
