= Koyuki Miyazaki =

Japanese kickboxer

- Born: 宮﨑 小雪; 5 February 2003 (age 23); Machida, Tokyo, Japan
- Nickname: Snow White
- Height: 1.53 m (5 ft 0 in)
- Weight: 46 kg (101 lb; 7 st 3 lb)
- Style: Kickboxing, Karate
- Stance: Southpaw
- Fighting out of: Machida, Tokyo, Japan
- Team: Yuushinjyuku Karate (2012-2018); TRY HARD Gym (2018-2025)
- Years active: 2012—2025

Kickboxing record
- Total: 18
- Wins: 16
- By knockout: 4
- Losses: 1
- By knockout: 0
- Draws: 1

Other information
- Notable relatives: Wakana Miyazaki (elder sister)

Koyuki Miyazaki (Japanese: 宮﨑小雪, Miyazaki Koyuki; born 5 February 2003) is a retired Japanese kickboxer, who competed in the atomweight division of RISE, where she was the RISE atomweight champion.

As of October 2022, she is ranked as the eighth best pound-for-pound women's kickboxer in the world by Beyond Kick.

== Kickboxing career ==
=== Early career ===
Miyazaki made her professional debut against Kira Matsutani at the inaugural RISE GIRLS POWER event, held on November 8, 2019. The fight was ruled a draw by split decision after three rounds. One judge scored the bout 30–29 for Miyazaki, the second scored it 30–28 for Matsutani, while the third judge scored it an event 29–29 draw.

Miyazaki was booked to face the undefeated Karen at KNOCK OUT CHAMPIONSHIP 2 on September 13, 2020. She won the fight by unanimous decision.

Miyazaki faced Ayaka at RISE DEAD OR ALIVE 2020 Osaka on November 1, 2020. She lost the fight by unanimous decision.

=== RISE Atomweight champion ===
==== Next Challenger tournament ====
On January 17, 2021, it was revealed that RISE would hold an atomweight "Next Challenger" tournament, in order to determine the next challenger for the RISE Women's Atomweight championship, which was held at the time by Momi Furuta. Miyazaki was booked to face Reina Sato in the tournament semifinals, held at RISE Girls Power 4 on January 17, 2021, while the other semifinals saw Arina Kobayashi face Nana Okuwaki. Miyazaki beat Sato by unanimous decision, with scores of 30–29, 30–28 and 30–27. Miyazaki advanced to the finals of the one-day tournament, where she faced Arina Kobayashi. She won the fight by unanimous decision. Two of the judges scored the fight 30–28 in her favor, while the third judge scored it 30–29 for Miyazaki.

Miyazaki was booked to challenge the reigning atomweight champion Momi Furuta at RISE 147 on March 28, 2021. She won the fight by a narrow majority decision. Two of the judges awarded her a 49–48 scorecard, while the third judge scored the bout as an even 48–48 draw.

==== Title reign ====
Miyazaki faced the incumbent WMC World Mini Flyweight and Battle of Muay Thai Pinweight titleholder Saya Ito in a non-title bout at RISE GIRLS POWER 5 on September 12, 2021. The fight was ruled a split decision draw after the first three rounds were contested, with Miyazaki winning the majority decision after an extra round was fought.

Miyazaki faced the former NJKF Minerva atomweight champion Momoka at RISE 155 on February 23, 2022. She won the fight by unanimous decision.

Miyazaki was scheduled to defend her RISE Atomweight title against Arina Kobayashi at RISE 158 on May 29, 2022. She won the fight by unanimous decision, with scores of 50–47, 50–46 and 50–46.

Miyazaki faced Petloolaon Sarigym in a non-title bout at RISE World Series 2022 on October 15, 2022. She won the fight by unanimous decision, with scores of 30–29, 30–29 and 30–28.

Miyazaki faced the Shootboxing Japan atomweight champion MISAKI in a non-title bout at RISE WORLD SERIES / SHOOTBOXING-KINGS on December 25, 2022. She won the fight by majority decision, with scores of 30–29, 30–28 and 29–29.

Miyazaki faced Byun Bo-Kyeong in a -47.5 kg catchweight bout at RISE EL DORADO 2023 on March 26, 2023. She won the fight by a third-round knockout, the first stoppage victory of her professional career.

Miyazaki faced Jumliat SuratThaniRajanhat at RISE World Series 2023 - 2nd Round on August 26, 2023. She stopped Jumliat at the very end of the opening round, with a left hook to the body.

Miyazaki faced Mongkutpetch KhaolakMuaythai at RISE WORLD SERIES 2023 Final Round on December 16, 2023. She won the fight by unanimous decision, with scores of 30–27, 30–27 and 30–26.

Miyazaki faced Miyuu Sugawara (K-1 Atomweight champion) in a -45.5 kg catchweight bout at K-1 World MAX 2024 - World Tournament Opening Round on March 20, 2024. The fight was ruled a unanimous decision draw after the first three rounds were contested, with Miyazaki winning the unanimous decision after an extra round was fought.

Miyazaki faced Siriporn Thaweesuk (former WBC female world light flyweight champion) at RISE 180 on July 26, 2024. She won the fight by a second-round technical knockout.

Miyazaki faced Tan Xuan Yun (WBC Muaythai female international mini flyweight champion) at RISE 184 on December 15, 2024. She won the fight by a second-round knockout.

On March 30, 2025, it was announced that Miyazaki vacated her RISE Atomweight title to study in the Philippines. She announced her retirement from the sport of kickboxing on October 10, 2025.

== Championships and accomplishments ==
=== Kickboxing ===
Professional

- RISE
  - 2021 RISE Next Challenger Tournament Winner
  - 2021 RISE Queen Atomweight Championship
    - One successful title defense

Amateur

- RISE
  - 2019 RISE NOVA All Japan Tournament -47 kg Champion

Awards

- eFight.jp
  - Fighter of the Month (March 2021)
- Beyond Kickboxing
  - Beyond Kickboxing's 2024 Female Fighter of the Year

=== Karate ===
- Karate Battle Kings
  - 2013 Karate Battle Kings Elementary School Championship Runner-up
- Japanese International Karate Association
  - 2014 JIKA All Japan Junior Championship Third Place
  - 2016 JIKA All Japan Championship Middle School Lightweight Runner-up
  - 2017 JIKA All Japan Championship Middle School Lightweight Winner
  - 2017 JIKA All Japan Junior Championship Lightweight Runner-up
- Kanto Boys and Girls Karate Tournament
  - 2015 Kanagawa Karate Middleschool Championship Runner-up
  - 2017 Kanagawa Karate Middleschool Lightweight Championship
  - 2018 Kanagawa Karate Middleschool Lightweight Championship
- IKO Kyokushin Kaikan
  - 2015 IKO World So-Kyokushin All Japan Jr. Championship Middle School 3rd Place
  - 2016 IKO World So-Kyokushin All Japan Jr. Championship Middle School Lightweight Winner
  - 2017 IKO World So-Kyokushin All Japan Jr. Championship Middle School Lightweight Runner-up
  - 2018 IKO World So-Kyokushin All Kanto Championship Middle School Lightweight Winner
- Kyokushin Seishin Kaikan
  - 2016 Seishin Kaikan All Kanto Middle School Lightweight Championship
- Byakuren Kaikan
  - 2016 Byakuren Kaikan All Kanto Championship Middle School –50 kg Winner
- Seiku Juku
  - 2017 East Japan Junior Full Contact Championship Middle School Lightweight Winner
- Karate Real Championships
  - 2017 All Japan Jr. Karate Real Championships Middle School –50 kg Winner
- World Karate Organization
  - 2018 WKO Japan Athlete Cup Middle School -50 kg Winner

== Kickboxing record ==
Professional Kickboxing Record
16 Wins (4 (T)KOs), 1 Loss, 1 Draw
Date	Result	Opponent	Event	Location	Method	Round	Time
2024-12-15	Win	(Singapore) Tan Xuan Yun	RISE 184	Tokyo, Japan	KO (Left high kick)	2	2:58
2024-07-26	Win	(Thailand) Samson C2M Muaythai＆Fitness	RISE 180	Tokyo, Japan	TKO (Referee stoppage)	2	2:17
2024-03-20	Win	(Japan) Miyuu Sugawara	K-1 World MAX 2024 - World Tournament Opening Round	Tokyo, Japan	Ext.R Decision (Unanimous)	4	3:00
2023-12-16	Win	(Thailand) Mongkutpetch KhaolakMuaythai	RISE World Series 2023 - Final Round	Tokyo, Japan	Decision (Unanimous)	3	3:00
2023-08-26	Win	(Thailand) Jumliat SuratThaniRajanhat	RISE World Series 2023 - 2nd Round	Tokyo, Japan	KO (Left hook to the body)	1	3:00
2023-03-26	Win	(South Korea) Byun Bo-Kyeong	RISE ELDORADO 2023	Tokyo, Japan	KO (Left straight)	3	1:50
2022-12-25	Win	(Japan) MISAKI	RISE WORLD SERIES / SHOOTBOXING-KINGS 2022	Tokyo, Japan	Decision (Majority)	3	3:00
2022-10-15	Win	(Thailand) Petlookaon Sarigym	RISE WORLD SERIES 2022	Tokyo, Japan	Decision (Unanimous)	3	3:00
2022-05-29	Win	(Japan) Arina Kobayashi	RISE 158	Tokyo, Japan	Decision (Unanimous)	5	3:00
Defends RISE Queen Atomweight (-46kg) title.
2022-02-23	Win	(Japan) Momoka	RISE 155	Tokyo, Japan	Decision (Unanimous)	3	3:00
2021-09-12	Win	(Japan) Saya Ito	RISE GIRLS POWER 5	Tokyo, Japan	Ext.R Decision (Majority)	4	3:00
2021-03-28	Win	(Japan) Momi	RISE 147	Tokyo, Japan	Decision (Majority)	5	3:00
Wins the RISE Queen Atomweight (-46kg) title .
2021-01-17	Win	(Japan) Arina Kobayashi	RISE Girls Power 4, Next Challenger Tournament Final	Tokyo, Japan	Decision (Unanimous)	3	3:00
2021-01-17	Win	(Japan) Reina Sato	RISE Girls Power 4, Next Challenger Tournament Semi Final	Tokyo, Japan	Decision (Unanimous)	3	3:00
2020-11-01	Loss	(Japan) Ayaka	RISE DEAD OR ALIVE 2020 Osaka	Osaka, Japan	Decision (Unanimous)	3	3:00
2020-10-11	Win	(Japan) Arina Kobayashi	RISE DEAD OR ALIVE 2020 Yokohama	Yokohama, Japan	Decision (Unanimous)	3	3:00
2020-09-13	Win	(Japan) Karen	KNOCK OUT CHAMPIONSHIP 2	Tokyo, Japan	Decision (Unanimous)	3	3:00
2019-11-08	Draw	(Japan) Kira Matsutani	RISE GIRLS POWER	Tokyo, Japan	Decision (Split)	3	3:00
Legend: Win Loss Draw/No contest Notes

Amateur Kickboxing Record
10 Wins (3 (T)KOs), 0 Losses, 0 Draws
Date	Result	Opponent	Event	Location	Method	Round	Time
2019-08-04	Win	(Japan) Honoka Kobayashi	RISE NOVA All Japan Tournament, Final	Tokyo, Japan	Decision (Split)	1	2:00
Wins RISE NOVA All Japan –47kg title.
2019-08-04	Win	(Japan) Hikari Kushida	RISE NOVA All Japan Tournament, Semi Final	Tokyo, Japan	Decision (Unanimous)	1	2:00
2019-08-04	Win	(Japan) Hitomi Kurihara	RISE NOVA All Japan Tournament, Quarter Final	Tokyo, Japan	Decision (Unanimous)	1	2:00
2019-06-02	Win	(Japan) Nana Kikuchihara	KAMINARIMON	Tokyo, Japan	TKO	1	
2018-10-21	Win	(Japan) Kanoko Igarashi	KAMINARIMON	Tokyo, Japan	Decision (Unanimous)	2	1:30
Legend: Win Loss Draw/No contest Notes

== See also ==
- List of female kickboxers
