= Misaki Morita =

Japanese kickboxer (born 1996)

MISAKI
- Born: Misaki Morita; 2 February 1996 (age 30); Toyohashi, Aichi, Japan
- Native name: 森田 実沙樹
- Nickname: Bullet Princess
- Height: 1.56 m (5 ft 1 1/2 in)
- Weight: 46 kg (101 lb; 7 st 3 lb)
- Style: Kickboxing, Shootboxing
- Stance: Orthodox
- Fighting out of: Toyohashi, Aichi, Japan
- Team: Grappling Shoot Boxers Toyohashi

Kickboxing record
- Total: 38
- Wins: 27
- By knockout: 5
- Losses: 10
- By knockout: 1
- Draws: 1

Other information
- Spouse: Kazuki Osaki

Misaki Morita (Japanese: 森田 実沙樹, Morita Misaki; born February 2, 1996), more popularly known by her ring name MISAKI, is a Japanese kickboxer. She is the current Shootboxing Women's Atomweight (-46 kg) champion.

As of November 2023, she is the #8 ranked women's atomweight kickboxer in the world according to Beyond Kickboxing.

== Early life ==
Morita took up karate in early elementary school, after being pressured to do so by her father who was a Kūdō instructor, in order to lose weight and begin socializing. She quickly left the sport however, as she disliked getting beaten in sparring by the older students. Morita avoided all extra curricular activities and after-school clubs from that point on and only took up shoot boxing at the age of 16 in order to lose weight. Morita began training at the Grappling Shoot Boxers Toyohashi, which was owned by her father, and entered her first amateur tournament, held to determine the SB Amateur West Japan National Team representatives, in 2015. She lost her very first fight, but was inspired to continue competing after seeing Mio Tsumura and Rena Kubota at the same event. Morita won the SB All Japan Amateur Tournament the next year and turned pro soon afterwards.

== Kickboxing career ==
=== Mini flyweight ===
==== Early career ====
MISAKI made her professional debut against Ayaka Haratani at Shizuoka Kick vol.2 on March 27, 2016. She won the fight by unanimous decision. MISAKI next made her shootboxing debut against Kaoru Chatani at SHOOTBOXING Young Caesar Cup Central #17 on June 12, 2016. She won the fight by a majority decision, after an extra round was contested.

Morita faced the 2015 Shoot Boxing Girls S-Cup Japan Tournament winner Mio Tsumura at SHOOTBOXING Young Caesar Cup in Hanayashiki act.2 on June 18, 2016. She lost the fight by unanimous decision, with scores of 30–28, 30–28 and 30–27.

Morita faced Maki Goto at Shootboxing Girls S-cup 2016 ~Tanabata Joshikaku Festival~ on July 7, 2016. The fight was ruled a split decision draw after the first three rounds, with scores of 30–28, 29–30 and 29–29. Morita was awarded the unanimous decision victory following the fourth, extra round.

Morita faced Tomomi Soda at Shootboxing 2017 Young Caesar Cup in Hanayashiki~ act.3 on August 21, 2016. She won the fight by unanimous decision, with two scorecards of 30–29 and one scorecard of 30–28.

Morita faced Yu Sakamoto at Shootboxing 2017 Young Ceaser Cup Central #18 on October 2, 2016. She won the fight by majority decision, after an extra round was fought, as the bout was ruled a majority decision draw after the first three rounds were contested.

Morita faced Hinata Terayama at J-NETWORK J-FIGHT&J-GIRLS 2017～J-NETWORK 20th Anniversary on March 12, 2017. The fight ended in a split decision draw, with scores of 29–28, 28–29 and 29–29.

Morita faced Tan Ka Lee at Shootboxing 2017 Young Ceaser Cup Central #19 on May 9, 2017. She won the fight by unanimous decision, with two ringside officials awarding her a 30–27 scorecard, while the third judge gave her an even wider 30–26 scorecard.

==== J-NETWORK Champion ====
Morita faced momi at J-FIGHT & J-GIRLS 2017 - J-NETWORK 20th Anniversary event on May 28, 2017, in the semifinals of the J-NETWORK Women's Mini Flyweight tournament. She won the fight by split decision, with scores of 29–28, 29–28 and 28–29. Morita next faced Nana Okuwaki in a non-tournament bout at SHOOT BOXING Girls S-cup 2017 on July 7, 2017. She won the fight a second-round technical knockout, the first stoppage victory of her professional career. Morita returned to J-NETWORK to face Hinata Terayama in the finals of the Mini Flyweight tournament on September 24, 2017. She own the fight by unanimous decision, with two scorecards of 49–46 and one scorecard of 48–47.

Morita faced Liu Jingjing for the Energy Fight×Shoot Boxing -51 kg title at Energy Fight×Shoot Boxing on December 17, 2017. She lost the fight by unanimous decision, after two additional rounds were contested.

Morita challenged Mio Tsumura for the Shootboxing Women's Strawweight (49 kg) championship at SHOOT BOXING 2018 act.1 on February 10, 2018. She lost the fight by majority decision, with scores of 49–48, 49–47 and 49–49.

MISAKI took part in the 2018 SHOOT BOXING Girl's S-Cup World Tournament, held on July 6, 2018. Although she was able to over Isis Verbeek, her quarterfinal opponent, by majority decision, MISAKI nonetheless lost to the eventual tournament winner Jleana Valentino in the semifinals. MISAKI rebounded from this loss with a unanimous decision victory over Ratchapon Poniramon at Shootboxing 2018 Young Ceaser Cup Central #23 on September 23, 2018.

MISAKI made her first J-NETWORK Women's Mini Flyweight (-48 kg) Championship defense against Hinata Terayama at J-Fight & J-Girls 2018: Act 4 on November 18, 2018. She lost the fight by unanimous decision, with scores of 49–48, 50–47 and 49–47.

==== Later mini flyweight career ====
MISAKI faced MARI at Shoot Boxing 2019 act.1 on February 11, 2019. She won the fight by unanimous decision, with scores of 30–29, 30–29 and 29–28. MISAKI next faced Yoo Jin Park at SHOOT BOXING 2019 act.3 on June 23, 2019. She won the fight by a first-round submission. These two victories earned MISAKI a place in the 2019 Shootboxing Girl's Japan S-Cup title, as she was booked to face Miki Kitamura in the tournament semifinals on July 21, 2019. She won the fight by unanimous decision and faced Megami Tegawa in the finals of the one-day tournament. Tegawa won the fight by a second-round technical knockout.

=== Atomweight ===
==== Move down in weight ====
Morita was expected to face Panchan Rina for the inaugural Rebels Women's Atomweight (-46 kg) title at REBELS 65 on April 24, 2020. The bout was later postponed due to the COVID-19 pandemic and rescheduled for August 30, 2020. She lost the fight by unanimous decision, with scores of 30–29, 30–28 and 30–28.

Morita faced Shoko JSK at SHOOT BOXING 2021 act.1 on February 7, 2021. She won the fight by unanimous decision, with scores of 30–29, 30–28 and 30–28. Morita next faced ERIKO at SHOOT BOXING 2021 act.3 on June 20, 2021. She won the fight by unanimous decision, with scores of 29–27, 30–27 and 30–25. Morita improved her win-streak to three consecutive victories with a unanimous decision triumph over Miyu Sakata at SHOOT BOXING Girls S-cup2021 -Road to Tournament- on July 29, 2021.

==== SHOOTBOXING champion ====
Morita faced Suzuka Tabuchi for the inaugural Shootboxing Women's Atomweight (-46 kg) title at Shoot Boxing 2021 Champion Carnival on December 26, 2021. She won the fight by unanimous decision. Morita was able to score a shoot point in the opening round with a hip throw.

Morita faced Miku Nakamura at Shoot Boxing 2022 act.3 on June 26, 2022. She won the fight by unanimous decision, with all three judges scoring the fight 30–27 in her favor.

Morita faced Petchada Wor. Yuttachai at Shoot Boxing Hanayashiki 2022 on October 19, 2022. She won the fight by a first-round knockout.

Morita faced the RISE Queen Atomweight (-46 kg) champion in a non-title bout at Rise World Series/Shootboxing Kings 2022 on December 24, 2022. She lost the fight by majority decision, with scores of 30–29, 30–28 and 29–29.

Morita faced the one-time RISE Queen Atomweight title challenger Arina Kobayashi at RISE 166: RISE 20th Memorial event on February 23, 2023. She won the fight by a unanimous decision. after suffering a knockdown in the third and final round.

Morita faced Hongyok Passanong Gym at SHOOT BOXING 2023 act.3 on June 25, 2023. She won the fight by a first-round knockout.

Morita faced Chan Lee at SHOOT BOXING 2023 Series Final on November 14, 2023. She won the fight by unanimous decision, with scores of 30–27, 30–26 and 30–25.

Morita faced Hongkaraya Korpasar Gym at Shoot Boxing 2024 act.2 on April 13, 2024. She won the fight by a second-round knockout.

Morita faced Mongkutpetch KhaolakMuaythai at Suk Wanchai MuayThai Super Fight on June 30, 2024. She lost the fight by unanimous decision, with all three judges scoring the bout 49–48 in favor of her opponent.

MISAKI made her ONE Championship debut against Ran Longshu at ONE Friday Fights 111 on June 6, 2025. She won the fight by unanimous decision.

On September 20, 2025, Misaki faced Clementine Egg at Heat 57 for the vacant ISKA oriental rules world atomweight title. She won the fight by unanimous decision with all three judges scoring the bout 50-44.

== Championships and accomplishments ==
- J-NETWORK
  - 2017 J-NETWORK Women's Mini Flyweight (-48 kg) Championship
- SHOOTBOXING
  - 2016 Shootboxing All Japan Amateur Tournament Winner
  - 2019 Shootboxing Girl's S-Cup Tournament Runner-up
  - 2021 Shootboxing Women's Atomweight (-46 kg) Championship
- International Sports Kickboxing Association
  - 2025 ISKA Oriental rules World Atomweight (-48 kg) Champion

== Fight record ==
Professional Kickboxing Record
27 Wins (5 (T)KOs), 10 Losses, 1 Draw
Date	Result	Opponent	Event	Location	Method	Round	Time
2026-12-02		(Thailand) Duangdawnoi Looksaikongdin	ONE Samurai 6	Yokohama, Japan			
2026-03-16	Win	(Thailand) Priaowan Petphairat	ONE Friday Fights 146, Lumpinee Stadium	Bangkok, Thailand	Decision (Split)	3	3:00
2025-09-20	Win	(Switzerland) Clementine Egg	HEAT 57	Kariya, Aichi, Japan	Decision (Unanimous)	5	3:00
Wins the vacant ISKA Oriental rules World Atomweight (-48 kg) title.
2025-06-06	Win	(China) Ran Longshu	ONE Friday Fights 111, Lumpinee Stadium	Bangkok, Thailand	Decision (Unanimous)	3	3:00
2024-12-26	Win	(Japan) Nadeshiko	SHOOTBOXING GROUND ZERO TOKYO 2024	Tokyo, Japan	Decision (Unanimous)	3	3:00
2024-06-30	Loss	(Thailand) Mongkutpetch KhaolakMuaythai	Suk Wanchai MuayThai Super Fight	Nagoya, Japan	Decision (Unanimous)	5	3:00
2024-04-13	Win	(Thailand) Hongkaraya Korpasar Gym	Shoot Boxing 2024 act.2	Tokyo, Japan	KO (Body kick)	2	0:21
2023-11-14	Win	(Japan) Chan Lee	SHOOT BOXING 2023 Series Final	Tokyo, Japan	Decision (Unanimous)	3	3:00
2023-06-25	Win	(Thailand) Hongyok Passanong Gym	SHOOT BOXING 2023 act.3	Tokyo, Japan	KO (Left hook)	1	1:43
2023-02-23	Loss	(Japan) Arina Kobayashi	RISE 166: RISE 20th Memorial event	Tokyo, Japan	Decision (Unanimous)	3	3:00
2022-12-24	Loss	(Japan) Koyuki Miyazaki	RISE WORLD SERIES / SHOOTBOXING-KINGS 2022	Tokyo, Japan	Decision (Majority)	3	3:00
2022-10-19	Win	(Thailand) Petchada Wor. Yuttachai	Shoot Boxing Hanayashiki 2022	Tokyo, Japan	TKO (Punches)	1	2:11
2022-06-26	Win	(Japan) Miku Nakamura	Shoot Boxing 2022 act.3	Tokyo, Japan	Decision (Unanimous)	3	3:00
2021-12-26	Win	(Japan) Suzuka Tabuchi	Shoot Boxing 2021 Champion Carnival	Tokyo, Japan	Decision (Unanimous)	5	3:00
Wins the inaugural Shootboxing Women's Atomweight (-46 kg) title.
2021-07-29	Win	(Japan) Miyu Sakata	SHOOT BOXING Girls S-Cup 2021 -Road to Tournament-	Tokyo, Japan	Decision (Unanimous)	5	3:00
2021-06-20	Win	(Japan) Eriko	Shoot Boxing 2021 act.3	Tokyo, Japan	Decision (Unanimous)	3	3:00
2021-02-27	Win	(Japan) Shoko	Shoot Boxing 2021 act.1	Tokyo, Japan	Decision (Unanimous)	3	3:00
2020-08-30	Loss	(Japan) Panchan Rina	REBELS 65	Tokyo, Japan	Decision (Unanimous)	5	3:00
For the inaugural Rebels Women's Atomweight (-46 kg) title.
2019-07-21	Loss	(Japan) Megami Tagawa	Shoot Boxing Girls S-cup 2019, Tournament Final	Tokyo, Japan	TKO (Corner retirement)	2	1:21
For the 2019 Shootboxing Girl's S-Cup title.
2019-07-21	Win	(Japan) Miki Kitamura	Shoot Boxing Girls S-cup 2019, Tournament Semifinal	Tokyo, Japan	Decision (Unanimous)	3	3:00
2019-06-23	Win	(South Korea) Yoo Jin Park	Shoot Boxing 2019 act.3	Tokyo, Japan	Submission (Standing guillotine choke)	1	1:57
2019-02-11	Win	(Japan) MARI	Shoot Boxing 2019 act.1	Tokyo, Japan	Decision (Unanimous)	3	3:00
2018-11-18	Loss	(Japan) Hinata Terayama	J-Fight & J-Girls 2018: Act 4	Tokyo, Japan	Decision (Unanimous)	5	2:00
For the J-NETWORK Women's Mini Flyweight (-48 kg) title.
2018-09-23	Win	(Thailand) Ratchapon Poniramon	Shootboxing 2018 Young Ceaser Cup Central #23	Tokyo, Japan	Decision (Unanimous)	3	3:00
2018-07-06	Loss	(Italy) Jleana Valentino	SHOOT BOXING Girls S-cup 2018, Tournament Semifinal	Tokyo, Japan	Decision (Unanimous)	3	3:00
2018-07-06	Win	(Netherlands) Isis Verbeek	SHOOT BOXING Girls S-cup 2018, Tournament Quarterfinal	Tokyo, Japan	Decision (Majority)	3	3:00
2018-02-10	Loss	(Japan) Mio Tsumura	SHOOT BOXING 2018 act.1	Tokyo, Japan	Decision (Majority)	5	3:00
For the Shootboxing Women's Strawweight (49 kg) championship.
2017-12-17	Loss	(China) Liu Jingjing	Energy Fight×Shoot Boxing	Hong Kong, China	2 Ext. R. Decision (Unanimous)	7	3:00
For the Energy Fight×Shoot Boxing -51 kg title.
2017-09-24	Win	(Japan) Hinata Terayama	J-FIGHT & J-GIRLS 2017 - J-NETWORK 20th Anniversary, Tournament Final	Tokyo, Japan	Decision (Unanimous)	5	2:00
Wins vacant the J-NETWORK Women's Mini Flyweight (-48 kg) title.
2017-07-07	Win	(Japan) Nana Okuwaki	SHOOT BOXING Girls S-cup 2017	Tokyo, Japan	TKO (Three knockdowns)	2	2:06
2017-05-28	Win	(Japan) momi	J-FIGHT & J-GIRLS 2017 - J-NETWORK 20th Anniversary, Tournament Semifinal	Tokyo, Japan	Decision (Split)	3	2:00
2017-05-09	Win	(South Korea) Tan Ka Lee	Shootboxing 2017 Young Ceaser Cup Central #19	Tokyo, Japan	Decision (Split)	3	2:00
2017-03-12	Draw	(Japan) Hinata Terayama	J-NETWORK J-FIGHT&J-GIRLS 2017～J-NETWORK 20th Anniversary	Tokyo, Japan	Decision (Split)	3	2:00
2016-10-02	Win	(Japan) Yu Sakamoto	Shootboxing 2017 Young Ceaser Cup Central #18	Tokyo, Japan	Ext. R. Decision (Majority)	4	2:00
2016-08-21	Win	(Japan) Tomomi Soda	Shootboxing 2017 Young Caesar Cup in Hanayashiki~ act.3	Tokyo, Japan	Decision (Unanimous)	3	2:00
2016-07-07	Win	(Japan) Maki Goto	Shootboxing Girls S-cup 2016 ~Tanabata Joshikaku Festival~	Tokyo, Japan	Ext. R. Decision (Unanimous)	4	3:00
2016-06-18	Loss	(Japan) Mio Tsumura	SHOOTBOXING Young Caesar Cup in Hanayashiki act.2	Tokyo, Japan	Decision (Unanimous)	3	3:00
2016-06-12	Win	(Japan) Kaoru Chatani	SHOOTBOXING Young Caesar Cup Central #17	Tokyo, Japan	Ext. R. Decision (Majority)	4	2:00
2016-03-27	Win	(Japan) Ayaka Haratani	Shizuoka Kick vol.2	Shizuoka, Japan	Decision (Unanimous)	3	2:00
Legend: Win Loss Draw/No contest Notes

== Personal life ==
In October 2024, it was announced that she married Kazuki Osaki, the reigning RISE Super Flyweight champion.

== See also ==
- List of female kickboxers
