= Kira Matsutani =

Japanese kickboxer (born 2003)

- Born: 松谷綺; 1 June 2003 (age 23); Nerima, Tokyo, Japan
- Height: 1.52 m (5 ft 0 in)
- Weight: 45 kg (99 lb; 7 st 1 lb)
- Style: Kickboxing
- Stance: Orthodox
- Fighting out of: Meguro, Tokyo, Japan
- Team: Vasileus (2026-Present); ALONZA ABLAZE (2021-2026); Vallely Kickboxing Team (2015-2021)
- Trainer: Masakazu Watanabe; Koya Urabe (former)
- Years active: 2019 - present

Kickboxing record
- Total: 18
- Wins: 14
- By knockout: 1
- Losses: 2
- By knockout: 0
- Draws: 2

Other information
- Notable relatives: Kiri Matsutani (brother)

Kira Matsutani (Japanese: 松谷綺, Matsutani Kira; born 1 June 2003) is a Japanese kickboxer, currently competing in the atomweight division of K-1, where she is the former K-1 Women's Atomweight Champion.

As of August 2023 she was the #10 ranked pound-for-pound women kickboxer in the world according to Combat Press.

== Kickboxing career ==
=== RISE ===
Matsutani made her professional debut against Chizuru Nanase at NJKF 2019 2nd on June 2, 2019. She won the fight by unanimous decision, with all three judges awarding her a 30–28 scorecard.

Matsutani made her RISE promotional debut against fellow debutante Koyuki Miyazaki at RISE GIRLS POWER on November 8, 2019. The fight was ruled a split decision draw. Two of the judges scored the fight 30–29 for Matsutani and 30–28 for Miyazaki respectively, while the third ringside official scored the fight an even 29–29.

Matsutani faced Mari Kamikariya in a -44 kg catchweight bout at Stand up Kickboxing Vol.1 on December 22, 2019. She won the fight by unanimous decision, with all three ringside officials awarding her a 30–26 scorecard.

Matsutani faced the debuting Arina Kobayashi at RISE Girls Power 2 on February 11, 2020. The fight was ruled a split decision draw. Matsutani next faced Miyu Sakata at RISE GIRLS POWER 3 on September 20, 2020. She won the fight by unanimous decision, sweeping all three rounds with all three judges.

=== K-1 ===
Matsutani faced Yuri Morikawa in her Krush debut at Krush 130 on October 31, 2021. She won the fight by unanimous decision, with three scorecards of 30–26. Matsutani next faced Satomi Toyoshima at Krush 134 on February 20, 2022. She likewise won the fight by unanimous decision.

On May 23, 2022, it was announced that Matsutani would be one of four women to take part in the K-1 Women's Atomweight Grand Prix, held to determine the inaugural K-1 champion at the weight, at K-1: Ring of Venus on June 25, 2022. She was eliminated in the tournament semifinals by Miyuu Sugawara, who defeated Matsutani by majority decision to hand her her first professional loss.

Matsutani faced Yu at Krush 143 on November 26, 2022. She won the fight by split decision. Matsutani next faced Ga Yeon Won at Krush Ring of Venus on April 8, 2023. She won the fight by unanimous decision.

Matsutani faced the former K-1 Women's Atomweight champion Phayahong Ayothayafightgym at K-1 World GP 2023 on July 17, 2023. She won the fight by unanimous decision, after an extra fourth round was contested.

Matsutani was expected to face Mako Yamada for the vacant Krush Women's Atomweight Championship at Krush 155 on November 25, 2023. Yamada withdrew with a hand fracture on November 8, and was replace by Nana Okuwaki. She won the fight by unanimous decision.

Matsutani faced Jung Yujung at K-1 World MAX 2024 - World Championship Tournament Final on July 7, 2024. She won the fight by unanimous decision.

Matsutani was scheduled to defend her Krush Women's Atomweight title against Gabrielle De Ramos at Krush 167 on November 16, 2024. The bout became a non title fight after De Ramos missed weight by 150g. She won the fight by a first-round knockout, the first stoppage victory of her professional career.

Matsutani faced Mafia Petchmongkoldee in the semifinals of the K-1 Women's Atomweight Grand Prix at K-1 World MAX 2025 on February 9, 2025. She won the fight by unanimous decision. In the final, Matsutani defeated Aki Suematsu by majority decision to win the vacant K-1 Women's Atomweight Championship.

Matsutani made her first K-1 Women's Atomweight Championship defense against Aki Suematsu at K-1 World MAX 2025 - 70kg World Tournament Opening Round on September 7, 2025. She won the fight by split decision, after an extra fourth round was contested.

Matsutani made her second K-1 Women's Atomweight Championship defense against Veronica Rodriguez at K-1 World GP 2026 -90kg World Tournament on February 8, 2026. She lost the fight by unanimous decision, suffering a knockdown in the third round.

On January 23, 2026, Matsutani vacated the Krush Women's Atomweight Championship in order to focus on her K-1 Championship.

== Championships and accomplishments ==
=== Amateur ===
- BigBang
  - 2017 Bigbang women -40 kg Champion
  - 2018 Bigbang women -45 kg Champion (one defense)
- New Japan Kickboxing Federation
  - 2019 NJKF EXPLOSION women -46 kg Champion

=== Professional ===
- Krush
  - 2023 Krush Women's Atomweight Champion
- K-1
  - 2025 K-1 Women's Atomweight (-45kg) Champion
    - One successful title defense

== Fight record ==
Professional Kickboxing Record
14 Wins (1 (T)KOs), 2 Losses, 2 Draws
Date	Result	Opponent	Event	Location	Method	Round	Time
2026-02-08	Loss	(Mexico) Veronica Rodriguez	K-1 World GP 2026 - 90kg World Tournament	Tokyo, Japan	Decision (Unanimous)	3	3:00
Loses the K-1 Women's Atomweight Championship.
2025-09-07	Win	(Japan) Aki Suematsu	K-1 World MAX 2025 - 70kg World Tournament Opening Round	Tokyo, Japan	Ext.R Decision (Split)	4	3:00
Defends the K-1 Women's Atomweight Championship.
2025-02-09	Win	(Japan) Aki Suematsu	K-1 World MAX 2025 - Atomweight Championship Tournament, Final	Tokyo, Japan	Decision (Majority)	3	3:00
Wins the vacant K-1 Women's Atomweight Championship.
2025-02-09	Win	(Thailand) Mafia Petchmongkoldee	K-1 World MAX 2025 - Atomweight Championship Tournament, Semifinals	Tokyo, Japan	Decision (Unanimous)	3	3:00
2024-11-16	Win	(Australia) Gabrielle De Ramos	Krush 167	Tokyo, Japan	KO (Knee to the body)	1	1:48
2024-07-07	Win	(South Korea) Jung Yujung	K-1 World MAX 2024 - World Championship Tournament Final	Tokyo, Japan	Decision (Unanimous)	3	3:00
2023-11-25	Win	(Japan) Nana Okuwaki	Krush 155 - 15th Anniversary	Tokyo, Japan	Decision (Unanimous)	3	3:00
Wins the vacant Krush Women's Atomweight Championship.
2023-07-17	Win	(Thailand) Phayahong Ayothayafightgym	K-1 World GP 2023	Tokyo, Japan	Ext.R Decision (Unanimous)	4	3:00
2023-04-08	Win	(South Korea) Ga Yeon Won	Krush Ring of Venus	Tokyo, Japan	Decision (Unanimous)	3	3:00
2022-11-26	Win	(Japan) Yu	Krush 143	Tokyo, Japan	Decision (Split)	3	3:00
2022-06-25	Loss	(Japan) Miyuu Sugawara	K-1: Ring of Venus, Tournament Semifinal	Tokyo, Japan	Decision (Majority)	3	3:00
2022-02-20	Win	(Japan) Satomi Toyoshima	Krush 134	Tokyo, Japan	Decision (Unanimous)	3	3:00
2021-10-31	Win	(Japan) Yuri Morikawa	Krush 130	Tokyo, Japan	Decision (Unanimous)	3	3:00
2020-09-20	Win	(Japan) Miyu Sakata	RISE GIRLS POWER 3	Tokyo, Japan	Decision (Unanimous)	3	3:00
2020-02-11	Draw	(Japan) Arina Kobayashi	RISE Girls Power 2	Tokyo, Japan	Decision (Split)	3	3:00
2019-12-22	Win	(Japan) Mari Kamikariya	Stand up Kickboxing Vol.1	Tokyo, Japan	Decision (Unanimous)	3	3:00
2019-11-08	Draw	(Japan) Koyuki Miyazaki	RISE GIRLS POWER	Tokyo, Japan	Decision (Split)	3	3:00
2019-06-02	Win	(Japan) Chizuru Nanase	NJKF 2019 2nd	Tokyo, Japan	Decision (Unanimous)	3	2:00
Legend: Win Loss Draw/No contest Notes

=== Amateur record ===
Amateur Kickboxing Record
Date	Result	Opponent	Event	Location	Method	Round	Time
2019-03-10	Win	(Japan) Kiho Kohata	NJKF EXPLOSION 20	Tokyo, Japan	Decision	3	1:30
Wins the inaugural NJKF EXPLOSION women -46kg title.
2018-12-09	Win	(Japan) Kiho Kohata	NJKF EXPLOSION 18	Tokyo, Japan	Decision	2	1:30
2018-11-04	Win	(Japan) Narumi Hen	Bigbang amateur 49	Tokyo, Japan	Decision (Unanimous)	3	1:30
Defends Bigbang amateur women -45kg title.
2018-07-15	Win	(Japan)	Bigbang the Future Sono 21	Tokyo, Japan	Decision (Unanimous)	3	1:30
Wins the vacant Bigbang amateur women -45kg title.
2018-04-08	Loss	(Japan) Riri Nasukawa	Bigbang the Future Sono 20	Tokyo, Japan	Decision (Unanimous)	3	1:30
For the vacant Bigbang amateur women -45kg title.
2018-02-04	Win	(Japan) Kiho Kohata	NJKF DUEL.13	Tokyo, Japan	Decision (Unanimous)		
2017-11-22	Loss	(Japan) Megami Tagawa	SHOOT BOXING BATTLE SUMMIT-GROUND ZERO TOKYO 2017	Tokyo, Japan	Decision (Unanimous)	3	2:00
2017-09-03	Win	(Japan) Rika Aimi	Bigbang amateur 42	Tokyo, Japan	Decision (Unanimous)	3	1:30
Wins the vacant Bigbang amateur women -40kg title.
2017-07-02	Loss	(Japan) Kirato Hakkaku	NJKF EXPLOSION 11	Tokyo, Japan	Decision	2	1:30
2016-10-30	Draw	(Japan) Kirato Hakkaku	NJKF EXPLOSION 7	Tokyo, Japan	Decision	2	1:30
2016-08-28	Loss	(Japan) Haruyuki Tanitsu	NJKF EXPLOSION 6	Tokyo, Japan	Decision	2	1:30
2016-05-15	Loss	(Japan) Haruyuki Tanitsu	NJKF EXPLOSION 5 - Championship Tournament, Semifinal	Tokyo, Japan	Decision	2	1:30
2016-02-07	Draw	(Japan) Keishin Watanabe	NJKF EXPLOSION 4	Tokyo, Japan	Decision	2	1:30
2016-02-07	Win	(Japan) Ruito Sugiyama	NJKF EXPLOSION 4	Tokyo, Japan	Decision	2	1:30
2015-11-01	Draw	(Japan) Ryujin Nasukawa	NJKF EXPLOSION 3	Tokyo, Japan	Decision	2	1:30
2015-07-05	Win	(Japan) Ryoma Sakurai	NJKF EXPLOSION 2	Tokyo, Japan	Decision	2	1:30
2015-07-05	Win	(Japan) Ruito Sugiyama	NJKF EXPLOSION 2	Tokyo, Japan	Decision	2	1:30
Legend: Win Loss Draw/No contest Notes

== See also ==
- List of female kickboxers
- List of Krush champions
- List of K-1 champions
