= Fuu (kickboxer) =

Japanese kickboxer

- Born: Fuu Sakata; 29 June 2004 (age 22); Osaka, Japan
- Native name: 坂田風羽
- Height: 1.48 m (4 ft 10 1/2 in)
- Weight: 46 kg (101 lb; 7 st 3 lb)
- Style: Kickboxing, Shoot boxing
- Fighting out of: Osaka, Japan
- Team: Phantom Dojo
- Years active: 2022 - present

Kickboxing record
- Total: 16
- Wins: 10
- Losses: 6

Fuu (Japanese: 風羽; born 29 June 2004) is a Japanese kickboxer. As of August 2024, she is ranked as the 9th-best women's atomweight kickboxer in the world by Beyond Kickboxing.

== Fight record ==
Kickboxing record
10 Wins (0 (T)KO), 6 Losses, 0 Draw
Date	Result	Opponent	Event	Location	Method	Round	Time
2026-08-08	Win	(Japan) Miyuu Sakata	KNOCK OUT.67	Osaka, Japan	Decision (Unanimous)	3	3:00
2026-03-14	Win	(Japan) Kiho	KNOCK OUT.62	Tokyo, Japan	Decision (Unanimous)	3	3:00
2025-11-23	Win	(Japan) Runa Okumura	Shoot Boxing Young Caesar Cup Central 38	Tokyo, Japan	Decision (Majority)	3	3:00
2025-08-30	Loss	(Japan) Haruka Shimada	RISE 191	Tokyo, Japan	Decision (Majority)	3	3:00
2025-04-12	Win	(Japan) Uver Miyu	Shoot Boxing 2025 act.2	Tokyo, Japan	Decision (Unanimous)	3	3:00
2024-11-08	Loss	(Philippines) Islay Erika Bomogao	ONE Friday Fights 86	Bangkok, Thailand	Decision (Unanimous)	3	3:00
2024-07-26	Win	(Japan) Honoka Kobayashi	RISE 180	Tokyo, Japan	Ext.R Decision (Unanimous)	4	3:00
2024-06-15	Win	(Japan) Miyu	Shoot Boxing 2024 act.3	Tokyo, Japan	Decision (Unanimous)	3	3:00
2024-03-12	Loss	(Hong Kong) Phoebe Lo	I-1 World Muaythai Grand Prix 2024	Hong Kong			
2023-09-10	Loss	(Japan) Nadeshiko	BOUT 47	Sapporo	Decision (Unanimous)	3	3:00
2023-05-28	Win	(South Korea) Min Ji Kim	Shoot Boxing Young Caeser Cup Central 32	Kasugai, Aichi	Decision (Unanimous)	3	2:00
2023-03-04	Loss	(Japan) Sami Ogawa	Hoost Cup Kings Kyoto 11	Kyoto, Japan	Decision (Majority)	3	3:00
2022-12-18	Win	(Japan) Azu	Shoot Boxing Young Caeser Cup: The Carnival Road to Korakuen	Tokyo, Japan	Decision (Unanimous)	3	3:00
2022-11-19	Win	(Japan) Runa Okumura	Shoot Boxing Young Caeser Cup Central 31	Kasugai, Aichi			
2022-10-19	Win	(Japan) Yumin	Shoot Boxing Hanayashiki 2022	Tokyo, Japan	Decision (Unanimous)	3	3:00
2022-05-29	Loss	(Japan) Ayaka Nishihara	RISE 158	Tokyo, Japan	Decision (Majority)	3	3:00

== See also ==
- List of female kickboxers
