= Hinata Terayama =

Japanese kickboxer

- Born: 寺山日葵; January 19, 2001 (age 25); Isesaki, Gunma prefecture, Japan
- Other names: The Empress
- Nationality: Japanese
- Height: 165 cm (5 ft 5 in)
- Weight: 48.0 kg (105.8 lb; 7.56 st)
- Division: Mini Flyweight
- Style: Kickboxing, Karate
- Stance: Orthodox
- Fighting out of: Tokyo, Japan
- Team: TEPPEN
- Trainer: Hiroyuki Nasukawa
- Years active: 2016 - 2022

Kickboxing record
- Total: 23
- Wins: 20
- By knockout: 1
- Losses: 2
- Draws: 1

Other information
- Notable relatives: Ryoga Terayama (brother)

Hinata Terayama (born 19 January 2001) is a retired Japanese kickboxer. A professional competitor from 2016 until 2022, Terayama held the RISE Mini Flyweight championship, the J-Girls Mini Flyweight championship, and was the 2020 RISE Queen of Queens Tournament winner.

She was ranked as a top ten female pound for pound kickboxer by Combat Press from November 2020 until her retirement in March 2022, peaking at #3. She was the 2020 Combat Press "Female Fighter of the Year".

== Kickboxing career ==
=== J-GIRLS ===
Terayama made her professional debut against C-CHAN in May 2016. She won the fight by unanimous decision.

Terayama won four of her next five fights, with decision wins against Mei Umeno, MARI, and an extra round decision against Miho, as well as a knockout victory over Miyako Mitsuhori. Hinata fought a majority draw with MISAKI.

In September 2017, Terayama fought a rematch with MISAKI for the J-GIRLS Mini Flyweight title. Hinata would lose the fight by unanimous decision.

Terayama rebounded with a three fight winning streak, defeating RINA, Momi and Miki Kitamura, to once again earn a chance to fight for the J-GIRLS Mini Flyweight title. She won the rubber match with MISAKI by unanimous decision.

In her next fight, Terayama was scheduled to fight Mio Tsumura. Tsumura won the fight by majority decision. Terayama won her next fight against Maki Goto by unanimous decision.

=== RISE ===
==== RISE Mini Flyweight champion ====
Two months later, during RISE 134, Terayama fought Reina Sato for the inaugural RISE Queen Mini Flyweight title. She won the fight by unanimous decision.

Contuinuing to fight with RISE, Terayama won her next three fights, winning decision against Momi, KOKOZ and Sasori.

Terayama participated in the 2020 RISE Queen of Queens Tournament. In the quarterfinals, she fought Erika❤️. The fight went into an extra round, after which Terayama won a decision. In the semifinals, she fought a rematch with Sasori, and won by split decision. In the finals, Hinata fought a rubber match with Momi, and won the fight by unanimous decision. Terayama won a cash prize of 3 million yen which is the biggest amount in Japanese kickboxing history for a women's tournament.

Terayama was scheduled to fight Aida Looksaikongdin at RISE El Dorado, held in February 2021. Aida was unable to enter Japan due to travel restrictions imposed by the COVID-19 pandemic, and was replaced by Suzuka Tabuchi. Terayama beat Tabuchi by unanimous decision.

Terayama was scheduled to defend her RISE title against AKARI on May 15, 2021. Terayama won the fight by unanimous decision, winning 48-47 on all three judges scorecards.

Terayama was scheduled to fight the RISE Women's Flyweight champion Manazo Kobayashi at RISE GIRLS POWER 5. The fight will be contested at a 49.5 kg catchweight. Terayama won the fight by majority decision, with scores of 30-29, 30-29 and 29-29.

Terayama announced her retirement from the sport on March 15, 2022, after undergoing surgery on her right hip.

== Titles and accomplishments ==
Professional

- RISE
  - 2020 RISE Queen of Queens Tournament Winner
  - 2019 RISE Queen Mini Flyweight Championship
    - One successful title defense
- J-NETWORK
  - 2018 J-GIRLS Mini Flyweight Champion

Amateur

- 2013 Bigbang -37 kg Champion
- 2014 Bigbang -40 kg Champion
- 2014 MA Kick Jr -42 kg Champion
- Bigbang Women -45 kg Champion
- 2014 J-NETWORK All Japan Women's B-League -46 kg Champion
- 2015 PRE J-GIRLS -46 kg Tournament Winner

Awards

- 2020 Combat Press Kickboxing Awards: Female Fighter of the Year

== Kickboxing record ==
Kickboxing record
20 Wins (1 (T)KO's), 2 Losses, 1 Draw, 0 No Contest
Date	Result	Opponent	Event	Location	Method	Round	Time
2021-09-12	Win	(Japan) Manazo Kobayashi	RISE GIRLS POWER 5	Tokyo, Japan	Decision (Majority)	3	3:00
2021-05-16	Win	(Japan) AKARI	RISE on Abema 2	Tokyo, Japan	Decision (Unanimous)	5	3:00
Defends RISE Queen Mini Flyweight title.
2021-02-28	Win	(Japan) Suzuka Tabuchi	RISE Eldorado 2021	Yokohama, Japan	Decision (Unanimous)	3	3:00
2020-11-01	Win	(Japan) Momi	RISE Dead or Alive Osaka, Queen of Queens Tournament Final	Osaka, Japan	Decision (Unanimous)	3	3:00
Wins RISE Queen of Queens Tournament title.
2020-11-01	Win	(Japan) Sasori	RISE Dead or Alive Osaka, Queen of Queens Tournament Semi Final	Osaka, Japan	Decision (Split)	3	3:00
2020-10-11	Win	(Japan) Erika❤️	RISE DEAD OR ALIVE 2020 Yokohama, Queen of Queens Tournament Quarter Final	Yokohama, Japan	Ext.R Decision (Unanimous)	4	3:00
2020-07-19	Win	(Japan) Sasori	RISE 140	Tokyo, Japan	Ext.R Decision (Unanimous)	4	3:00
2020-02-11	Win	(Japan) KOKOZ	RISE GIRLS POWER 2	Tokyo, Japan	Decision (Unanimous)	3	3:00
2019-11-08	Win	(Japan) Momi	RISE GIRLS POWER	Tokyo, Japan	Decision (Unanimous)	3	3:00
2019-09-29	Win	(Japan) Reina Sato	RISE 134	Tokyo, Japan	Decision (Unanimous)	5	3:00
Wins inaugural RISE Queen Mini Flyweight title.
2019-07-05	Win	(Japan) Maki Goto	RISE 133	Tokyo, Japan	Decision (Unanimous)	3	3:00
2019-02-11	Loss	(Japan) MIO	Shoot Boxing 2019 act.1	Tokyo, Japan	Decision (Majority)	3	3:00
2018-11-18	Win	(Japan) MISAKI	J-NETWORK "J-FIGHT ＆ J-GIRLS 2018 ～4th～"	Tokyo, Japan	Decision (Unanimous)	5	2:00
Wins J-GIRLS Mini Flyweight title.
2018-07-16	Win	(Japan) Miki Kitamura	RISE 126	Tokyo, Japan	Decision (Unanimous)	3	3:00
2018-02-25	Win	(Japan) Momi	SHINING☆STAR with J-FIGHT & J-GIRLS 2018	Tokyo, Japan	Decision (Unanimous)	3	2:00
2017-12-03	Win	(Japan) RINA	Bigbang 31	Tokyo, Japan	Decision (Unanimous)	3	2:00
2017-09-24	Loss	(Japan) MISAKI	J-NETWORK "J-FIGHT＆J-GIRLS 2017～J-NETWORK 20th Anniversary～7th"	Tokyo, Japan	Decision (Unanimous)	5	2:00
For the J-GIRLS Mini Flyweight title.
2017-05-28	Win	(Japan) Miho	J-FIGHT & J-GIRLS 2017～J-NETWORK 20th Anniversary～3rd	Tokyo, Japan	Ext.R Decision (Unanimous)	4	2:00
2017-03-12	Draw	(Japan) MISAKI	J-FIGHT & J-GIRLS 2017～J-NETWORK 20th Anniversary～ 1st	Tokyo, Japan	Decision (Majority)	3	2:00
2016-12-25	Win	(Japan) Miyako Mitsuhori	J-GIRLS 2016～Believe the unbreakable hearts～with J-FIGHT	Tokyo, Japan	KO	1	1:17
2016-08-28	Win	(Japan) MARI	J-FIGHT & J-GIRLS 2016 5th	Tokyo, Japan	Decision (Unanimous)	3	2:00
2016-07-07	Win	(Japan) Mei Umeno	SHOOT BOXING Girls S-cup 2016	Tokyo, Japan	Decision (Unanimous)	3	3:00
2016-05-05	Win	(Japan) C-CHAN	J-NETWORK J-KICK 2016～Honor the fighting spirits～2nd	Tokyo, Japan	Decision (Unanimous)	3	2:00
Legend: Win Loss Draw/No contest Notes

Amateur Kickboxing Record
Date	Result	Opponent	Event	Location	Method	Round	Time
2015-08-09	Win	(Japan) Yuri Kano	RISE ZERO	Tokyo, Japan	Decision (Unanimous)	2	1:30
2015-06-14	Win	(Japan) Nana Okuwaki	JAKF SMASHERS 174, Final	Tokyo, Japan	Decision (Unanimous)		
2015-06-14	Win	(Japan) Ayaka Koyama	JAKF SMASHERS 174, Semi Final	Tokyo, Japan	Decision (Unanimous)		
2015-03-29	Win	(Japan) Yumiko Moriya	J-NETWORK All Japan Amateur Championship	Tokyo, Japan	Decision (Unanimous)	2	1:30
2015-02-22	Win	(Japan) Chigusa Tanaka	J-GIRLS 2015 ～Aim for the ace of aces～1st, Pre J-GIRLS Tournament Final	Tokyo, Japan	KO	1	0:49
Wins Pre J-GIRLS -46kg Tournament title.
2015-02-22	Win	(Japan) Hiroko Yoshida	J-GIRLS 2015 ～Aim for the ace of aces～1st, Pre J-GIRLS Tournament Semi Final	Tokyo, Japan	Decision (Unanimous)	1	1:30
2015-02-22	Win	(Japan) Sara Yoshio	J-GIRLS 2015 ～Aim for the ace of aces～1st, Pre J-GIRLS Tournament Quarter Final	Tokyo, Japan	Decision (Unanimous)	1	1:30
2014-12-21	Loss	(Japan) Momoka Yoshikawa	All Japan Amateur Shoot Boxing	Tokyo, Japan	Decision (Unanimous)	2	
For the Amateur Shoot Boxing All Japan -48kg title
2014-11-23	Win	(Japan) Rinka Sato	10th J-NETWORK All Japan Championship, Women's B-League -46 kg Final	Tokyo, Japan	Decision (Unanimous)		
Wins J-NETWORK All Japan B-League -46kg title.
2014-11-23	Win	(Japan) Hayakawa	10th J-NETWORK All Japan Championship, Women's B-League -46 kg Semi Final	Tokyo, Japan	Decision (Unanimous)		
2014-08-24	Win	(Japan) Shunka Date	J-GROW 44 ～Oomori Survival 2014～	Tokyo, Japan	KO	2	
2014-08-24	Win	(Japan) Toyoshige Miyazawa	J-GROW 44 ～Oomori Survival 2014～	Tokyo, Japan	KO	1	
2014-06-22	Win	(Japan) Miki Kametsu	J-GIRLS 2014 ～The shining wild angels～ 2nd	Tokyo, Japan	KO	2	0:49
2014-06-01	Loss	(Japan) Kohei Watanabe	Bigbang Amateur 21	Tokyo, Japan	Decision	2	1:30
2014-04-13	Win	(Japan) Kenji Kawata	MA Nihon Kick DRAGON.5 ～THE ONE AND ONLY～	Kanagawa, Japan	Decision (Unanimous)	3	2:00
Wins MA Kick Jr -42kg title.
2014-02-23	Win	(Japan) Ryotaro Uchida	Bigbang Amateur 19	Tokyo, Japan	Decision	3	2:00
Wins Bigbang Amateur -40kg title.
2013-10-13	Loss	(Japan) Reito Yoshida	Bigbang Amateur 17, -40 kg Tournament Final	Tokyo, Japan	Decision	3	2:00
2013-10-13	Win	(Japan) Reina Sato	Bigbang Amateur 17, -40 kg Tournament Semi Final	Tokyo, Japan	Decision	2	2:00
2013-09-01	Win	(Japan) Michitaka Yamaguchi	Bigbang Amateur 16	Tokyo, Japan	Decision	3	2:00
Wins Bigbang Amateur -37kg title.
2013-07-14	Win	(Japan) Daiya Kakuta	Bigbang Amateur 15	Tokyo, Japan	Decision (Unanimous)	2	1:30
2013-07-14	Draw	(Japan) Reito Yoshida	Bigbang Amateur 15	Tokyo, Japan	Decision	2	1:30
2013-06-02	Win	(Japan) Taison Suzuki	Bigbang Amateur 14	Tokyo, Japan	Decision (Unanimous)	2	1:30
2013-06-02	Loss	(Japan) Riichi Hosono	Bigbang Amateur 14	Tokyo, Japan	Decision (Majority)	2	1:30
2013-03-10	Win	(Japan) Ryunosuke Suzuki	Bigbang the future VI	Tokyo, Japan	Decision	3	2:00
Wins Bigbang Amateur -37kg title.
Legend: Win Loss Draw/No contest Notes

== See also ==
- List of female kickboxers
