= Hiroki Akimoto =

Japanese kickboxer (born 1992)

- Born: 秋元皓貴; August 31, 1992 (age 34); Toyota, Aichi, Japan
- Nationality: Japanese
- Height: 5 ft 7 in (1.70 m)
- Weight: 145 lb (65.8 kg; 10.4 st)
- Division: Bantamweight (145 lb); Flyweight (135 lb)
- Reach: 67.3 in (171 cm)
- Style: Full Contact Karate
- Fighting out of: Singapore
- Team: Evolve MMA; Shoryukai Gym MMA; Shichishu-Kai
- Rank: Black belt in Kyokushin karate

Kickboxing record
- Total: 34
- Wins: 29
- By knockout: 10
- Losses: 5
- By knockout: 1

Hiroki Akimoto (秋元 皓貴, Akimoto Hiroki; born August 31, 1992) is a Japanese kickboxer. He competes in ONE Championship's bantamweight and flyweight division, where he is the former ONE Kickboxing Bantamweight World Champion.

As of June 2022, he is ranked as the second-best featherweight kickboxer in the world by Combat Press. He's been ranked in the top ten since December 2021.

== Background ==
Japanese-born Akimoto began his martial arts journey at the age of eight. He took up full contact karate and became a top talent over his years of training. Both of his parents were instructors in the Shichishu-Kai, but he was never forced to participate. It was not until he was involved in a fight at school did he decide to take up martial arts.

As his skills grew, he turned to competition. He did not stick with karate, and also competed in Muay Thai and kickboxing bouts. To get the most of his talents, Akimoto moved from Japan to Singapore to train at Evolve MMA and pursue a world title in ONE Championship.

== Kickboxing career ==
Akimoto got off to an incredible start to his professional career. He racked up 19 straight kickboxing victories that would lead him to be signed by ONE Championship.

=== ONE Championship ===
==== Early promotional career ====
Akimoto made his organizational debut with ONE Championship on January 25, 2019 at ONE Championship: Hero's Ascent. It was his first kickboxing bout in nearly six years. Akimoto won the fight by unanimous decision.

The now 20–0 striker returned to competition on March 31, 2019 at ONE Championship: A New Era against Joseph Lasiri. Akimoto lost the bout by majority decision, suffering the first loss of his professional career.

Akimoto faced Kenny Tse at ONE Championship: Masters Of Destiny on July 12, 2019. He won the fight by unanimous decision, successfully rebounding from his loss to Lasiri.

==== Move to Bantamweight ====
Akimoto faced Zhang Chenglong at ONE Championship: Reign of Dynasties 2 on October 17, 2020. He won the fight by split decision. Due to the close decision, the pair were immediately booked for a rematch at ONE Championship: Fists Of Fury on February 26, 2021. Akimoto was more convincing in the rematch, as he beat Zhang by unanimous decision.

Akimoto faced former Wu Lin Feng kickboxing champion Qiu Jianliang at ONE: Winter Warriors on December 3, 2021. He won the bout via unanimous decision.

==== Bantamweight kickboxing champion ====
Akimoto (then the #2 ONE Kickboxing Bantamweight contender) challenged the reigning ONE Bantamweight kickboxing champion Capitan Petchyindee Academy at ONE: X on March 25, 2022. He won the fight by unanimous decision, after controlling the final four rounds of the bout. Capitan was twice warned for illegal clinching and was deducted a point for it in the fourth round. Akimoto was given the $50,000 Performance of the Night award as well, and was named the March 2022 "Fighter of the Month" by eFight.

Akimoto made his first ONE Bantamweight Kickboxing World title defense against #4 ranked contender Petchtanong Petchfergus at ONE 163 on November 18, 2022. He lost the fight by split decision.

==== Post title reign ====
After a 1-year and 5-month hiatus, Akimoto faced Wei Rui on May 4, 2024, at ONE Fight Night 22. He lost the fight by unanimous decision.

Akimoto faced Ilias Ennahachi on September 27, 2024, at ONE Friday Fights 81. He lost the fight via unanimous decision.

Akimoto faced John Lineker on March 23, 2025, at ONE 172. He won the fight via split decision.

Akimoto faced Wei Rui in a rematch at ONE 173, on November 16, 2025. He won the bout via unanimous decision.

Akimoto next faced Taimu Hisai at ONE Samurai 1, on April 29, 2026. He won the bout via split decision.

Akimoto next challenged Jonathan Haggerty for the ONE Bantamweight Kickboxing World Championship, at ONE Samurai 4 on October 17, 2026. He lost the bout via TKO in the third round, getting dropped with a punch and follow-up knee combination. While he did beat the count, his corner threw in the towel shortly afterwards.

== Titles and accomplishments ==
=== Kickboxing and Muay Thai ===
==== Amateur ====
- Martial Arts Japan Kickboxing Federation
  - 2008 MAJKF All Japan Tournament Bantamweight Winner & event MVP
- K-1
  - 2010 K-1 Koshien Tournament Runner-up

==== Professional ====
- ONE Championship
  - ONE Bantamweight Kickboxing World Championship (One time)
  - Performance of the Night (One time) vs. Capitan Petchyindee
- MA Japan Kickboxing Federation
  - 2012 MAJKF Featherweight Champion
- WBC Muay Thai
  - 2012 WBC Muay Thai Japan Featherweight Champion

Awards

- eFight.jp
  - 2x Fighter of the Month (October 2012, March 2022)
- Beyond Kickboxing
  - 2022 Beyond Kick "Fight of the Year" (vs. Capitan Petchyindee Academy)

=== Karate ===
- Japan Karate Judge Organization
  - 2005 JKJO Karate-Do MAC Japan Cup Middle School -40 kg runner-up
  - 2006 JKJO Karate-Do MAC Japan Cup Middle School -50 kg runner-up
  - 2007 JKJO Karate-Do MAC Japan Cup Middle School -40 kg runner-up
  - 2007 JKJO All Japan Junior Championship Middle School -55 kg runner-up
- Japanese Fullcontact Karate Organization
  - 2015 JFKO All Japan Full Contact Championship Lightweight Runner-up
  - 2016 JFKO All Japan Full Contact Championship Lightweight 3rd Place
  - 2017 JFKO All Japan Full Contact Championship Lightweight Champion
- Kyokushin World Federation
  - 2016 KWF Russian Open Lightweight 1st Place
  - 2017 KWF Karate Grand Prix Lightweight Champion
  - 2017 KWF Karate European Championship 70 kg 3rd Place
  - 2018 KWF Karate Grand Prix Lightweight Runner-up

Professional Kyokushin

- World Fighting Kyokushin Organization
  - 2018 WFKO World Pro Kyokushin -65 kg Champion

== Fight record ==
Kickboxing record
29 Wins (10 (T)KO's), 5 Losses, 0 Draw, 0 No Contest
Date	Result	Opponent	Event	Location	Method	Round	Time
2026-10-17	Loss	(United Kingdom) Jonathan Haggerty	ONE Samurai 4	Tokyo, Japan	TKO (corner stoppage)	3	0:42
For the ONE Bantamweight Kickboxing World Championship.
2026-04-29	Win	(Japan) Taimu Hisai	ONE Samurai 1	Tokyo, Japan	Decision (split)	3	3:00
2025-11-16	Win	(China) Wei Rui	ONE 173	Tokyo, Japan	Decision (unanimous)	3	3:00
2025-03-23	Win	(Brazil) John Lineker	ONE 172	Saitama, Japan	Decision (split)	3	3:00
2024-09-27	Loss	(Morocco) Ilias Ennahachi	ONE Friday Fights 81	Bangkok, Thailand	Decision (unanimous)	3	3:00
2024-05-03	Loss	(China) Wei Rui	ONE Fight Night 22	Bangkok, Thailand	Decision (unanimous)	3	3:00
2022-11-19	Loss	(Thailand) Petchtanong Petchfergus	ONE 163	Kallang, Singapore	Decision (split)	5	3:00
Lost the ONE Bantamweight Kickboxing World Championship.
2022-03-26	Win	(Thailand) Capitan Petchyindee Academy	ONE: X	Kallang, Singapore	Decision (unanimous)	5	3:00
Wins the ONE Bantamweight Kickboxing World Championship.
2021-12-03	Win	(China) Qiu Jianliang	ONE: Winter Warriors	Kallang, Singapore	Decision (unanimous)	3	3:00
2021-02-26	Win	(China) Zhang Chenglong	ONE Championship: Fists Of Fury	Kallang, Singapore	Decision (unanimous)	3	3:00
2020-10-17	Win	(China) Zhang Chenglong	ONE Championship: Reign of Dynasties 2	Kallang, Singapore	Decision (split)	3	3:00
2019-07-12	Win	(Australia) Kenny Tse	ONE Championship: Masters Of Destiny	Kuala Lumpur, Malaysia	Decision (unanimous)	3	3:00
2019-03-31	Loss	(Italy) Joseph Lasiri	ONE Championship: A New Era	Tokyo, Japan	Decision (majority)	3	3:00
2019-01-25	Win	(Australia) Josh Tonna	ONE Championship: Hero's Ascent	Pasay, Philippines	Decision (unanimous)	3	3:00
2013-04-14	Win	(Thailand) Surachai Sisuriyanyothin	MAJKF Dragon Road One and Only Take 1	Kanagawa Prefecture, Japan	Decision (unanimous)	5	3:00
2012-12-02	Win	(Japan) Shunta	BigBang 11	Tokyo, Japan	Decision (unanimous)	5	3:00
2012-10-07	Win	(Japan) Yosuke Morii	MAJKF Break-30 ～Unification～	Tokyo, Japan	Decision (unanimous)	5	3:00
Wins WBC Muay Thai Japan Featherweight title.
2012-07-15	Win	(Japan) Daiki Fujisawa	MAJKF Kick Guts 2012	Tokyo, Japan	TKO (doctor stoppage)	1	1:28
Wins MA Japan Kick Featherweight title.
2012-05-06	Win	(Japan) Kenryu	MAJKF Break-25 ～Cannonball～	Tokyo, Japan	KO (right front kick)	1	2:52
2012-02-25	Win	(Japan) Fumiya Sasaki	BigBang 8	Tokyo, Japan	KO (left high kick)	1	2:40
2011-08-21	Win	(Japan) Atsushi Masukura	BigBang 6	Tokyo, Japan	KO (high knee)	3	0:18
2011-07-24	Win	(Thailand) Pinsiam Sor.Amnuaysirichoke	MAJKF J-1 time ～signal of start～	Aichi Prefecture, Japan	KO (left hook to the body)	2	0:54
2011-05-15	Win	(Japan) Shota	BigBang 5	Tokyo, Japan	KO (left knee)	1	1:46
2011-02-05	Win	(Japan) TURBO	BigBang 4	Tokyo, Japan	KO (flying knee)	2	1:05
2010-09-23	Win	(Japan) Seidou Yamaguchi	BigBang 3	Tokyo, Japan	Decision (unanimous)	3	3:00
2010-05-04	Win	(Japan) Kyoji Bancho	MAJKF Explosion-1	Japan	Decision (unanimous)	3	3:00
2010-04-04	Win	(Japan) Toshiya Sudou	MAJKF Boukohyouga Sono Ichi	Chiba, Japan	TKO (corner stoppage)	2	1:17
2010-03-14	Win	(Japan) Tadashi Matsumoto	Nagoya Kick ～Central Rhythm～	Chiba, Japan	Decision (unanimous)	3	3:00
2010-01-31	Win	(Japan) Shoya Suzuki	Nagoya Kick ～KICK Hopping！～	Nagoya, Japan	Decision (unanimous)	3	3:00
2009-03-08	Win	(Japan) Masayuki Ishibashi	Nagoya Kick 〜Boogie Fight 07 Black Sunday〜	Nagoya, Japan	Decision (majority)	3	3:00
2008-12-23	Win	(Japan) Norifumi Yamamura	Nagoya Kick ～2008 FINAL Nagoya vs Muay Thai Drum Roll Please!!～	Nagoya, Japan	Decision (unanimous)	3	3:00
2008-10-19	Win	(Japan) Shin Takashiro	MAJKF Break Through 7 ～Champion Carnival～	Tokyo, Japan	KO (knee)	3	0:43
2008-08-29	Win	(Japan) Mutsuki Ebata	K-1 Koshien -KING OF UNDER 18-	Tokyo, Japan	Decision (unanimous)	3	3:00
2008-08	Win	(Thailand) Yokdam		Thailand	KO	1	
Legend: Win Loss Draw/No contest Notes

Amateur Kickboxing Record
Date	Result	Opponent	Event	Location	Method	Round	Time
2010-11-20	Loss	(Japan) Shoei Hareyama	K-1 Koshien -KING OF UNDER 18- Final Tournament, Final	Tokyo, Japan	KO (low Kick)	3	0:23
For the 2010 K-1 Koshien Title.
2010-11-20	Win	(Japan) Keigo Ishida	K-1 Koshien -KING OF UNDER 18- Final Tournament, Semifinals	Tokyo, Japan	KO (left middle kick)	4	
2010-11-20	Win	(Japan) Sho Ogawa	K-1 Koshien -KING OF UNDER 18- Final Tournament, Quarterfinals	Tokyo, Japan	Ext.R Decision (unanimous)	4	
2010-11-20	Win	(Japan) Koji Kashimura	K-1 Koshien -KING OF UNDER 18- Final Tournament, Second Round	Tokyo, Japan	KO	1	
2010-11-20	Win	(Japan) Yuki Kurihara	K-1 Koshien -KING OF UNDER 18- Final Tournament, First Round	Tokyo, Japan	TKO	1	
2010-09-04	Win	(Japan) Tensho Ato	K-1 Koshien 2010 West Japan Selection	Osaka, Japan	KO (Punches)	3	0:30
2009-10-26	Loss	(Japan) Shota Shimada	K-1 World MAX 2009 World Championship Tournament Final - Koshien Tournament, Quarterfinals	Tokyo, Japan	Decision	3	2:00
2009-08-10	Win	(Japan) Hiroto Yamaguchi	K-1 Koshien 2009 KING OF UNDER 18 -FINAL16-	Tokyo, Japan	Decision	3	2:00
2009-07-04	Win	(Japan) Sho Ogawa	K-1 Koshien 2009 Chubu Region Selection Tournament, Final	Japan	Ext.R Decision	2	2:00
2009-07-04	Win	(Japan) Hiroto Iwasaki	K-1 Koshien 2009 Chubu Region Selection Tournament, Semi Finals	Japan	Decision	1	2:00
2009-07-04	Win	(Japan) Hideaki Ishida	K-1 Koshien 2009 Chubu Region Selection Tournament, Quarter Finals	Japan	Decision	1	2:00
2009-07-04	Win	(Japan) Shunsuke Okuno	K-1 Koshien 2009 Chubu Region Selection Tournament, First Round	Japan	KO (knee to the Body)	1	
2008-07-27	Win	(Japan) Ryota Terada	2008 MAJKF Amateur All Japan Tournament, Final	Fuefuki, Japan			
Wins the 2008 MAJKF Amateur All Japan Tournament Bantamweight Title.
2008-04-29	Win	(Japan) Yuki Miwa	MAJKF "BREAK THROUGH-3"	Tokyo, Japan	Decision (unanimous)	2	2:00
2007-10-28	Win	(Japan) Yuji Morihira	6th BRIDGE one match challenge	Tokyo, Japan	Decision	2	3:00
Legend: Win Loss Draw/No contest Notes

== See also ==
- List of current ONE fighters
