= Kiho (kickboxer) =

Japanese kickboxer

- Born: 1 November 2002 (age 24); Nagareyama, Japan
- Height: 1.57 m (5 ft 2 in)
- Style: Kickboxing
- Team: Knock Out Gym Chofu
- Years active: 2020 - present

Kickboxing record
- Total: 25
- Wins: 12
- By knockout: 3
- Losses: 9
- Draws: 4

Kiho (born 1 November 2002) is a Japanese kickboxer. She is a former Knock Out Black Atomweight Champion.

As of October 2025, she is ranked as the 5th-best women's atomweight kickboxer in the world by Beyond Kickboxing.

== Championships and accomplishments ==
=== Kickboxing ===
- Knock Out
  - 2025 Knock Out Black Atomweight (-46kg) Champion

== Fight record ==
Kickboxing record
12 Wins (3 (T)KO's), 9 Losses, 4 Draws
Date	Result	Opponent	Event	Location	Method	Round	Time
2026-11-22	Win	(Japan) Miyuu Sakata	Knock Out MX Live 3	Tokiwa, Japan	Decision (Unanimous)	3	3:00
2026-09-20	Win	(Japan) Sea	Knock Out MX Live 2	Tokiwa, Japan	Decision (Unanimous)	3	3:00
2026-07-05	Win	(Japan) Yuki Shirayuki	Knock Out MX Live	Tokiwa, Japan	TKO (Right Straight)	1	0:28
2026-05-10	Loss	(Japan) Sea	Knock Out Rebels Series 10	Tokiwa, Japan	Decision (Split)	3	3:00
2026-03-14	Loss	(Japan) Fuu	Knock Out.62	Tokyo, Japan	Decision (Unanimous)	3	3:00
For the Knock Out Black Atomweight (-46kg) Championship.
2025-12-30	Loss	(Japan) Mako Yamada	Knock Out.60 - K.O Climax 2025	Tokyo, Japan	Decision (Majority)	3	3:00
Wins the vacant Knock Out Black Atomweight (-46kg) Championship.
2025-09-23	Win	(Japan) Mako Yamada	Knock Out.57	Tokyo, Japan	Ext.R Decision (Split)	4	3:00
2025-07-20	Win	(Japan) Yuri Morikawa	Knock Out.55	Tokyo, Japan	Decision (Unanimous)	3	3:00
2025-05-18	Win	(Japan) Nao	Knock Out 2025 vol.3	Tokyo, Japan	KO (Right Head Kick)	3	1:43
2025-02-09	Win	(Japan) Minori Kikuchi	Knock Out 2025 vol.1	Tokyo, Japan	Decision (Split)	3	3:00
2024-12-01	Win	(Japan) Miyu	Knock Out 2024 vol.6	Tokyo, Japan	Decision (Majority)	3	3:00
2024-04-27	Win	(Japan) KAI	Knock Out 2024 vol.2	Tokyo, Japan	Decision (Unanimous)	3	3:00
2023-08-27	Draw	(Japan) Aki Suematsu	Krush 152	Tokyo, Japan	Decision (Split)	3	3:00
2023-04-08	Loss	(Japan) Raika	Krush - Ring of Venus	Tokyo, Japan	Decision (Unanimous)	3	3:00
2022-11-29	Loss	(Japan) Satomi Toyoshima	Krush 143	Tokyo, Japan	Decision (Split)	3	2:00
2022-06-24	Draw	(Japan) Miho Yata	K-1 WORLD GP 2022 JAPAN - Ring of Venus	Tokyo, Japan	Decision (Majority)	3	2:00
2022-01-28	Loss	(Japan) Chan Lee	Krush 133	Tokyo, Japan	Decision (Unanimous)	3	3:00
2021-11-27	Draw	(Japan) Miho Yata	Krush-EX 2021 vol.7	Tokyo, Japan	Decision (Majority)	3	2:00
2021-08-07	Loss	(Japan) Satomi Toyoshima	Krush-EX 2021 vol.4	Tokyo, Japan	Decision (Unanimous)	3	2:00
2021-06-05	Loss	(Japan) Riko Kato	Krush-EX 2021 vol.3	Tokyo, Japan	Decision (Unanimous)	3	2:00
2021-11-27	Draw	(Japan) Yuri Morikawa	Krush 122	Tokyo, Japan	Decision (Split)	3	2:00
2020-12-20	Win	(Japan) Ami	KROSS×OVER 10	Tokyo, Japan	KO (Punch)	2	0:26

== See also ==
- List of female kickboxers
