= Mako Yamada =

Japanese female professional kickboxer and boxer (born 1994)

- Born: 26 May 1994 (age 32); Itoshima, Fukuoka, Japan
- Native name: 山田真子
- Other names: Hakata Speedster
- Height: 153 cm (5 ft 0 in)
- Weight: 46 kg (101 lb; 7 st 3 lb)
- Division: Mini flyweight (Boxing); Atomweight (Kickboxing)
- Style: Kickboxing; Boxing
- Stance: Orthodox
- Fighting out of: Itoshima, Fukuoka, Japan
- Team: WEED Gym (2010); Team MA ☆ KO (2011); Hakata Kyoei Gym (2012-2014); Kings Gym (2019-2024); GROOVY (2025-present)
- Years active: 2010 - present

Professional boxing record
- Total: 7
- Wins: 7
- By knockout: 2

Kickboxing record
- Total: 21
- Wins: 15
- By knockout: 0
- Losses: 3
- Draws: 3

Other information
- Boxing record from BoxRec

Mako Yamada (山田真子, born 26 May 1994) is a Japanese kickboxer and former boxer, currently competing in the atomweight division of KNOCK OUT.

Yamada is a former boxing world champion, having held the WBO mini flyweight title in 2014. She is the first Japanese woman to win a world title in Korea and the first female Japanese fighter to win a WBO world title.

A professional competitor since 2010, Yamada is the 2010 J-Girls Next Challenger tournament winner, as well as the 2010 J-Girls atomweight champion.

== Kickboxing career ==
=== J-Girls ===
==== Next Title Challenger Tournament ====
Yamada made her professional debut against yu-kid at J-NETWORK「J-GIRLS Catch The stone〜8」, in the quarterfinals of the J-Girls Atomweight Next Title Challenger Tournament, on 30 May 2010. She won the fight by unanimous decision, with scores of 30–27, 30–28 and 30–28.

Yamada was scheduled to face Masae Marunaka in the tournament semifinals, held at J-NETWORK「J-GIRLS Catch The stone〜9」 on 25 July 2010. She won the fight by unanimous decision, with scores of 30–27, 30–28 and 30–28.

Yamada advanced to the tournament finals, where she faced the #4 ranked J-Girls atomweight Miho at J-NETWORK「J-GIRLS Catch The stone〜10」 on 20 September 2010. Miho was the more experienced competitor heading into the bout, with nine professional bouts. Yamada won the fight by unanimous decision, with scores of 30–27, 30–27 and 30–28.

==== J-Girls Atomweight champion ====
Winning the tournament earned Yamada the right to challenge the reigning atomweight champion Ayaka Miyauchi. They were scheduled to fight at J-NETWORK「J-GIRLS Women's Festival 2010 ~ Fighting women are beautiful ~」 on 12 December 2010. Yamada won the fight by a dominant unanimous decision, with scores of 50–47, 50–46, 50–47.

Yamada was scheduled to face Nana Kusakabe at King of Strikers 6 on 10 April 2011. the fight was ruled a majority draw, with one of the three judges scoring the fight for Yamada.

Yamada was scheduled to face the #1 ranked J-Girls mini-flyweight Momi at J-NETWORK「J-GIRLS 2011 〜Born This Way 2nd〜」 on 10 July 2011. The fight was ruled a majority draw. Two of the judges scored the fight as a draw, with scores of 29–29 and 30–30, while the third judge scored it 30–29 for Momi.

Yamada made her first title defense against the #1 ranked atomweight contender Miho at J-NETWORK「J-GIRLS 2011 〜Born This Way FINAL〜」 on 27 November 2011. Yamada won the closely contested bout by majority decision, with two of the judges scoring the fight 50–48 in her favor, while the third judge scored it as a 49–49 draw.

Following her exhibition bout with Saya Ito on 19 February 2012, Yamada announced she would retire from kickboxing and transition to professional boxing.

Following a successful two-year boxing career, which saw her win the WBO mini flyweight title, Yamada returned to kickboxing to face Jon Yejin at NEO GENERATION on 14 December 2014. She won the fight by unanimous decision.

=== K-1 ===
Yamada made her return to kickboxing in late 2019. She was scheduled to face Moe Takahashi at Krush 107 on 8 November 2019. Yamada won the fight by an extra round split decision.

Yamada was scheduled to face Yu Fukuhara at K-1 World GP 2020 in Fukuoka on 2 November 2020. She won the fight by unanimous decision, with scores of 30–29, 30–28 and 30–28.

Yamada was scheduled to face the four-time Shootboxing tournament winner Mio Tsumura at K'Festa 4 Day 2 on 27 March 2021. Tsumura won the fight by a wide unanimous decision, with two of the judges giving her a 30–26 scorecard, while the third judge scored the fight 30–25 for Tsumura.

Yamada was scheduled to face Nozomi Sigemura at K-1 World GP 2021 in Fukuoka on 17 July 2021. Yamada won the fight by unanimous decision.

Yamada was scheduled to face Chan Lee at Krush 131 on 20 November 2021. She won the fight by unanimous decision.

Yamada faced Marine Bigey at K-1: Ring of Venus on 25 June 2022. She won the fight by unanimous decision.

Yamada faced Nana Okuwaki at Krush Ring of Venus on 8 April 2023. She won the fight by unanimous decision, with two scorecards of 30–28 and one scorecard of 30–29.

Yamada faced KAI at Kings Cup 1st on 11 June 2023. She won the fight by decision. Following this victory, Yamada was booked to face Kira Matsutani for the vacant Krush Women's Atomweight Championship Krush 155 on 25 November 2023. Yamada withdrew with a hand fracture on 8 November, and was replaced by Nana Okuwaki.

Yamada announced that her contract with the K-1 organization had ended on 6 November 2024.

=== KNOCK OUT ===
Yamada made her KNOCK OUT debut against the Knock Out-Black Female Minimumweight champion Panchan Rina in a non-title bout at KNOCK OUT 2025 vol.1 on 11 February 2020. The fight was ruled a draw by split decision, after an extra fourth round was contested. As it was impossible for a bout to end in a draw following an extension round, the promotion later clarified that they had revised the rules to allow for such an event, but failed to inform the public.

Yamada faced Kiho for the vacant Knock Out Black Atomweight (-46kg) Championship at KNOCK OUT 57 on 23 September 2025. She lost the bout by split decision following an additional fourth round. After the match, organization representative Genki Yamaguchi stated that the organizers do not intervene in judges’ decisions due to a separation of authority. A rematch was later scheduled for KNOCK OUT.60 on 30 December 2025. Yamada won the fight by majority decision.

== Boxing career ==
Yamada made her professional boxing debut against Chadaphorn Suklert on 12 April 2012. She won the fight by unanimous decision. She would go on to amass a 6-0 record over the course of the next two years, earning two stoppage victories along the way.

She was scheduled to challenge the reigning WBO mini-flyweight champion Hong Su-yun on 9 February 2014, in what was the fourth title defense for the reigning champion. Despite coming into the fight as an underdog, Yamada won the fight by split decision, becoming the first Japanese woman to win a WBO world title.

== Championships and accomplishments ==
=== Kickboxing ===
- J-Network
  - J-Girls Atomweight Next Title Challenger Tournament Winner
  - J-Girls Atomweight Championship (One successful title defense)
- Knock Out
  - 2025 Knock Out Black Atomweight (-46kg) Champion

=== Boxing ===
- WBO
  - WBO World Mini Flyweight Championship

== Kickboxing record ==
Kickboxing record
15 Wins (0 (T)KO's), 3 Losses, 3 Draws, 0 No Contest
Date	Result	Opponent	Event	Location	Method	Round	Time
2026-09-05	Loss	(Japan) Koto Hiraoka	KNOCK OUT.68 ～KNOCKIN' on the WORLD～	Yokohama, Japan	Decision (Split)	3	3:00
Loses the Knock Out Black Atomweight (-46kg) Championship.
2025-12-30	Win	(Japan) Kiho	KNOCK OUT.60 - K.O CLIMAX 2025	Tokyo, Japan	Decision (Majority)	3	3:00
Wins the Knock Out Black Atomweight (-46kg) Championship.
2025-09-23	Loss	(Japan) Kiho	KNOCK OUT 57	Tokyo, Japan	Ext.R Decision (Split)	4	3:00
For the vacant Knock Out Black Atomweight (-46kg) Championship.
2025-08-29	Win	(Japan) Minori Kikuchi	KNOCK OUT 56	Tokyo, Japan	Decision (Unanimous)	3	3:00
2025-02-09	Draw	(Japan) Panchan Rina	KNOCK OUT 2025 vol.1	Tokyo, Japan	Ext.R Decision (Split)	4	3:00
2023-06-11	Win	(Japan) KAI	Kings Cup 1st	Fukuoka, Japan	Decision	3	3:00
2023-04-08	Win	(Japan) Nana Okuwaki	Krush Ring of Venus	Tokyo, Japan	Decision (Unanimous)	3	3:00
2022-06-25	Win	(France) Marine Bigey	K-1: Ring of Venus	Tokyo, Japan	Decision (Unanimous)	3	3:00
2021-11-20	Win	(Japan) Chan Lee	Krush 131	Tokyo, Japan	Decision (Unanimous)	3	3:00
2021-07-17	Win	(Japan) Nozomi Shigemura	K-1 World GP 2021 in Fukuoka	Fukuoka, Japan	Decision (Unanimous)	3	3:00
2021-03-27	Loss	(Japan) Mio Tsumura	K'Festa 4 Day 2	Yoyogi, Japan	Decision (Unanimous)	3	3:00
2020-11-02	Win	(Japan) Yu Fukuhara	K-1 World GP 2020 in Fukuoka	Fukuoka, Japan	Decision (Unanimous)	3	3:00
2019-11-08	Win	(Japan) Moe Takahashi	Krush 107	Osaka, Japan	Ext. R. Decision (Split)	4	2:00
2014-12-14	Win	(South Korea) Jon Yejin	NEO GENERATION	Fukuoka, Japan	Decision (Unanimous)	3	3:00
2011-11-27	Win	(Japan) Miho	J-NETWORK "J-GIRLS 2011 〜Born This Way FINAL〜"	Tokyo, Japan	Decision (Majority)	5	2:00
Defends the J-Girls Atomweight Championship.
2011-07-10	Draw	(Japan) Momi	J-NETWORK "J-GIRLS 2011 〜Born This Way 2nd〜"	Tokyo, Japan	Decision (Majority)	3	2:00
2011-04-10	Draw	(Japan) Nana Kusakabe	King of Strikers 6	Fukuoka, Japan	Decision (Majority)	3	2:00
2010-12-12	Win	(Japan) Ayaka Miyauchi	J-NETWORK J-GIRLS Women's Festival 2010 ~ Fighting women are beautiful ~	Tokyo, Japan	Decision (Unanimous)	5	2:00
Wins the J-Girls Atomweight Championship.
2010-09-20	Win	(Japan) Miho	J-NETWORK "J-GIRLS Catch The stone〜10", Tournament Final	Tokyo, Japan	Decision (Unanimous)	3	2:00
Wins the J-Girls Atomweight Next Title Challenger Tournament.
2010-07-25	Win	(Japan) Masae Marunaka	J-NETWORK "J-GIRLS Catch The stone〜9", Tournament Semifinal	Tokyo, Japan	Decision (Unanimous)	3	2:00
2010-05-30	Win	(Japan) yu-kid	J-NETWORK "J-GIRLS Catch The stone〜8", Tournament Quarterfinal	Tokyo, Japan	Decision (Unanimous)	3	2:00
Legend: Win Loss Draw/No contest Notes

Amateur Kickboxing Record
Date	Result	Opponent	Event	Location	Method	Round	Time
2009-09-27	Win	(Japan) Nana Kusakabe	J-GIRLS Catch The stone～4	Tokyo, Japan	Decision (Unanimous)	2	1:30
Wins the J-Girls Junior -50 kg title.
2007-05-20	Loss	(Japan) Madoka Jinnai	J-NETWORK "Onna Matsuri Final round"	Tokyo, Japan	Decision (Unanimous)	2	1:30
Legend: Win Loss Draw/No contest Notes

== Professional boxing record ==
7 fights	7 wins	0 losses
By knockout	2	0
By decision	5	0

No.	Result	Record	Opponent	Type	Round, time	Date	Location	Notes
7	Win	7–0	(South Korea) Hong Su-yun	SD	10	9 February 2014	Hoban Gymnasium, Chuncheon, South Korea	Wins the WBO mini flyweight title.
6	Win	6–0	(Thailand) Chamagorn Sithsaithong	UD	8	21 December 2013	Kyuden Gym, Fukuoka, Japan	
5	Win	5–0	(Thailand) Sumalee Tongpootorn	TKO	3 (8), 1:22	11 August 2013	Ito Bunka Hall, Itoshima, Fukuoka, Japan	
4	Win	4–0	(Japan) Mika Iwakawa	UD	6	9 February 2013	Azalea Taisho, Osaka, Japan	
3	Win	3–0	(Thailand) Ladda Rungrueang	KO	1 (6), 1:21	9 December 2012	Ito Bunka Hall, Itoshima, Fukuoka, Japan	
2	Win	2–0	(Japan) Nahoko Tanaka	UD	4	30 September 2012	Kyuden Gym, Fukuoka, Japan	
1	Win	1–0	(Thailand) Chadaphorn Suklert	UD	4	15 April 2012	Kokura Kita Gym, Kitakyushu, Japan	

== See also ==
- List of female kickboxers
- List of female boxers
- List of WBO female world champions
