= Runa Okumura =

Japanese kickboxer

- Born: 2 July 2005 (age 21); Nagoya, Japan
- Height: 1.51 m (4 ft 11 1/2 in)
- Weight: 46 kg (101 lb; 7 st 3 lb)
- Style: Kickboxing, Karate
- Team: OISHI GYM
- Years active: 2022 - present

Kickboxing record
- Total: 15
- Wins: 9
- Losses: 6
- By knockout: 1

Runa Okumura (Japanese: 奥村 琉奈, Okumura Runa; born 2 July 2005) is a Japanese kickboxer. As of December 2024, she is ranked as the tenth-best women's atomweight kickboxer in the world by Beyond Kickboxing.

== Fight record ==
Professional Kickboxing record
9 Wins (0 (T)KO), 7 Losses, 0 Draw
Date	Result	Opponent	Event	Location	Method	Round	Time
2026-06-28	Win	(Japan) Ayame	RISE 199	Tokyo, Japan	Decision (Unanimous)	3	3:00
2026-02-23	Win	(Japan) Marimo	RISE 196	Tokyo, Japan	Decision (Unanimous)	3	3:00
2025-12-27	Win	(Japan) Rima Sakagami	Hoost Cup Kings Nagoya 18	Nagoya, Japan	Decision (Majority)	3	3:00
2025-11-23	Loss	(Japan) Fuu	Shoot Boxing Young Caesar Cup Central 38	Tokyo, Japan	Decision (Majority)	3	3:00
2025-08-09	Loss	(Thailand) Priewwan Petchphorat	Fairtex Fight, Lumpinee Stadium	Bangkok, Thailand	Decision	3	3:00
2025-05-31	Loss	(Japan) Haruka Shimada	RISE 188	Tokyo, Japan	TKO (Punches)	1	2:27
2024-12-15	Loss	(Japan) Koto Hiraoka	RISE 184	Tokyo, Japan	Ext.R Decision (Unanimous)	4	3:00
2024-08-31	Win	(Japan) Momoka	RISE 181	Tokyo, Japan	Decision (Unanimous)	3	3:00
2024-05-12	Win	(Japan) Minori Kikuchi	RISE EVOL.12	Tokyo, Japan	Decision (Unanimous)	3	3:00
2024-02-11	Win	(Japan) Riana	NJKF 2024 west 1st	Sakai, Japan	Decision (Majority)	3	
2023-11-19	Loss	(Japan) Rika Sakamoto	Shoot Boxing Young Caeser Cup Central 33	Kasugai, Aichi	Decision (Split)	3	
2023-09-24	Win	(Japan) Uver∞miyU	DEEP HAMAMATSU IMPACT 2023	Hamamatsu, Japan	Decision (Unanimous)	3	3:00
2023-07-23	Loss	(Japan) Raika	KAKUMEI KICKBOXING	Osaka, Japan	Decision (Unanimous)	3	
2023-06-23	Win	(Japan) Yun Toshima	RISE 169	Tokyo, Japan	Decision (Majority)	3	3:00
2023-02-23	Win	(Japan) Mao Yamazato	Super S-BATTLE 2023	Nagoya, Japan	Decision (Unanimous)	3	3:00
2022-11-19	Loss	(Japan) Fuu	Shoot Boxing Young Caeser Cup Central 31	Kasugai, Aichi			

== See also ==
- List of female kickboxers
