= Haruka Shimada (kickboxer) =

Japanese kickboxer

- Born: 21 October 1996 (age 30); Miyazaki, Japan
- Height: 1.51 m (4 ft 11 1/2 in)
- Weight: 50 kg (110 lb; 7 st 12 lb)
- Style: Kickboxing, Karate
- Stance: Southpaw
- Team: team VASILEUS
- Years active: 2024 - present

Kickboxing record
- Total: 8
- Wins: 8
- By knockout: 2

Haruka Shimada (Japanese: 島田 知佳, Shimada Haruka; born 21 October 1996) is a Japanese kickboxer, who competed in the atomweight division of RISE, where she is the current RISE atomweight champion.

As of June 2025, she is ranked as the eighth-best women's atomweight kickboxer in the world by Beyond Kickboxing.

== Kickboxing career ==
Shimada made her professional debut against Amiru Yamasaki at RISE 180 on July 26, 2024. She won the fight by unanimous decision.

On December 15, 2024, Shimada faced Sea at RISE 184. She won the fight by unanimous decision.

Shimada faced Yuika Iwanaga at RISE 186 on February 23, 2025. She won the fight by unanimous decision.

=== RISE Women's Atomweight tournament ===
On April 24, 2025, it was announced that a RISE Women's atomweight tournament would be held to crown the third champion.

Shimada faced Runa Okumura at RISE 188 on May 31, 2025. She won the bout by a first-round technical knockout.

Shimada defeated Fuu by majority decision at RISE 191 on August 30, 2025.

Shimada faced Koto Hiraoka for the vacant RISE Women's Atomweight title at RISE 194 on December 14, 2025. She won the bout by unanimous decision.

== Titles and accomplishments ==
- RISE
  - 2025 RISE Women's Atomweight (-46kg) Champion

== Fight record ==
Professional Kickboxing record
8 Wins (2 (T)KO), 0 Loss, 0 Draw
Date	Result	Opponent	Event	Location	Method	Round	Time
2026-11-08	Win	(Japan) Mari	RISE 203	Tokyo, Japan	Decision (Unanimous)	3	3:00
2026-06-28	Win	(Thailand) Pancake Sor.Kongkrapan	RISE 199	Tokyo, Japan	TKO (Punches)	1	
2025-12-14	Win	(Japan) Koto Hiraoka	RISE 194	Tokyo, Japan	Decision (Unanimous)	5	3:00
Wins the vacant RISE Women's Atomweight title.
2025-08-30	Win	(Japan) Fuu	RISE 191	Tokyo, Japan	Decision (Majority)	3	3:00
2025-05-31	Win	(Japan) Runa Okumura	RISE 188	Tokyo, Japan	TKO (Punches)	1	2:27
2025-02-23	Win	(Japan) Yuika Iwanaga	RISE 186	Tokyo, Japan	Decision (Unanimous)	3	3:00
2024-12-15	Win	(Japan) Sea	RISE 184	Tokyo, Japan	Decision (Unanimous)	3	3:00
2024-07-26	Win	(Japan) Amiru Yamasaki	RISE 180	Tokyo, Japan	Decision (Unanimous)	3	3:00

== See also ==
- List of female kickboxers
