= Riki Onodera =

Japanese kickboxer

- Born: 小野寺力; July 7, 1974 (age 52); Tokyo, Japan
- Nationality: (Japan) Japanese
- Height: 171 cm (5 ft 7 in)
- Weight: 60 kg (130 lb; 9.4 st)
- Style: Kickboxing
- Stance: Orthodox
- Fighting out of: Tokyo, Japan

Kickboxing record
- Total: 37
- Wins: 25
- By knockout: 14
- Losses: 8
- Draws: 4

Riki Onodera is a Japanese former professional kickboxer. He operates as producer for various Japanese kickboxing events such as NO KICK NO LIFE and KNOCK OUT.

== Biography ==
Onodera started kickboxing at 14 years old when he joined Meguro Gym in Tokyo. He made his pro debut while still being in high school against Hiroshi Yamada on November 13, 1992. He won the fight by unanimous decision.

In 1996, Onodera reached the #1 contender spot in the MAJKF promotion but left to compete for the All Japan Kickboxing Federation. He became a notable name when he beat AJKF star Kensaku Maeda on March 24, 1996. On May 25, 1996, Onodera participated in the inaugural Shin Nihon Kickboxing Association event in which he won the Featherweight title against Hiroshi Oshiba by KO. Onodera would go on to defend the title for the next 4 years. In 1997, Onodera was invited to the K-1 Grand Prix '97 Final to participate in a 4-man featherweight tournament alongside champions from other Japanese organizations. The invitation was declined by the head of SNKA.

After losing to Phetborai Chuwattana on March 26, 2003, Onodera took time off the ring and created his own kickboxing gym called RIKIX, it officially opened its doors in November 2003. For his retirement fight on October 29, 2005, Onodera challenged Muay Thai champion Anuwat Kaewsamrit. At this occasion, Onodera became promoter and put on the first "NO KICK NO LIFE" event. He lost the fight by KO in round 2.

In 2016, Onodera became the producer of a new Japanese kickboxing promotion called KNOCK OUT. In 2019 Onodera left the KNOCK OUT promotion. In 2020, he returned to his original promotion NO KICK NO LIFE and produced a new event for the first time in 4 years.

== Titles and accomplishments ==
- Shin Nihon Kickboxing Association
  - 1996 SNKA Featherweight Champion

== Kickboxing record ==
Professional Kickboxing Record (Incomplete)
25 Wins (14 (T)KO's), 8 Losses, 4 Draws
| Date | Result | Opponent | Event | Location | Method | Round | Time |
| 2005-10-29 | Loss | (Thailand) Anuwat Kaewsamrit | SNKA "Onodera Riki Retirement Memorial Event" | Tokyo, Japan | KO (Right hook) | 2 | 2:18 |
| 2003-03-26 | Loss | (Thailand) Phetborai Chuwattana | SNKA "SPEED KINGS" | Tokyo, Japan | TKO (Punches) | 3 | 1:11 |
| 2002-09-16 | Win | (Thailand) Rattanasak Saktawee | SNKA "Riki Onodera Greatest Hits!" | Tokyo, Japan | Decision (Unanimous) | 5 | 3:00 |
| 2001-07-28 | Draw | (Japan) Satoshi Koide | SNKA "EXTREME MISSION" | Tokyo, Japan | Decision (Split) | 5 | 3:00 |
| 2001-05-27 | Win | (Korea) Yang Han young | SNKA "The Star Fleet" | Tokyo, Japan | Decision (Majority) | 5 | 3:00 |
| 2001-01-21 | Loss | (Korea) Park Byung-gyu | SNKA "THE REMATCH～HEAVEN or HELL" | Tokyo, Japan | KO (High Kick) | 2 | 2:38 |
| 2000-10-28 | Win | (Thailand) Tejakarin Kiatprasanchai | SNKA "ROAD TO MUAY THAI 2000" | Tokyo, Japan | KO (High Kick) | 3 | 2:07 |
| 2000-09-10 | Win | (Japan) Yoshinori Emori | SNKA "THE STYLISH FORCE" | Tokyo, Japan | TKO (3 Knockdowns) | 3 | 2:56 |
| 2000-07-29 | Win | (Japan) Atsushi Suzuki | SNKA "NO KICK NO LIFE" | Tokyo, Japan | Decision (Unanimous) | 5 | 3:00 |
| 2000-01-23 | Win | (Japan) Masahide Fujiyabu | SNKA "DOUBLE IMPACT" | Tokyo, Japan | KO (Left Hook) | 1 | 0:56 |
| 1999-11-28 | Win | (Thailand) Naruenart Jockygym | Rajadamnern Stadium - SNKA "FIGHT TO MUAY-THAI" | Bangkok, Thailand | KO | 5 | 0:51 |
| 1999-10-30 | Win | (Thailand) Komsan Tor Pitakkgrakan | SNKA "Road to Muay-Thai 2nd" | Tokyo, Japan | KO (Low Kick) | 4 | 1:56 |
| 1999-09-15 | Win | (Japan) Munesada Nishi | SNKA | Tokyo, Japan | Decision (Split) | 5 | 3:00 |
| 1999-07-24 | Loss | (Thailand) Jarunsak Chuwattana | SNKA | Tokyo, Japan | Decision (Unanimous) | 5 | 3:00 |
| 1999-05-30 | Win | (Thailand) Sinakorn Kiatyongyut | SNKA | Tokyo, Japan | KO | 2 | 2:38 |
| 1999-03-13 | Loss | (Thailand) Jiiphet Sor Vorapin | SNKA | Tokyo, Japan | Decision (Unanimous) | 5 | 3:00 |
| 1999-01-30 | Win | (Japan) Masaru | SNKA | Tokyo, Japan | Decision (Unanimous) | 5 | 3:00 |
Defends the SNKA Featherweight title.
| 1998-10-31 | Loss | (Thailand) Apiwat Por.Barumgan | SNKA | Tokyo, Japan | Decision (Unanimous) | 5 | 3:00 |
| 1998-07-25 | Win | (Thailand) Atar Jitigym | SNKA | Tokyo, Japan | KO | 5 | 0:16 |
| 1998-05-05 | Draw | (Japan) Masaru | SNKA | Tokyo, Japan | Decision (majority) | 5 | 3:00 |
Defends the SNKA Featherweight title.
| 1998- | Win | Khaled Asmed | SNKA | Tokyo, Japan | Decision (Unanimous) | 5 | 3:00 |
| 1997 | Win | (Japan) Naoki Inaba | SNKA | Tokyo, Japan | Decision | 5 | 3:00 |
| 1997-01-11 | Win | (United States) David Cummings | SNKA | Tokyo, Japan | | | |
| 1996-05-25 | Win | (Japan) Hiroshi Oshiba | SNKA | Tokyo, Japan | KO | | |
Wins the SNKA Featherweight title.
| 1996-03-24 | Win | (Japan) Kensaku Maeda | AJKF | Yokohama, Japan | Decision | 5 | 3:00 |
| 1996-01-26 | Win | (Japan) Eiji Matsuo | MA Nihon Kickboxing | Japan | | | |
| 1995-12-09 | Win | (Japan) Takaya Sato | MA Nihon Kickboxing vs AJKF | Tokyo, Japan | KO | | |
| 1995-06-02 | Draw | (Japan) 通明 Yamazaki | MA Nihon Kickboxing | Japan | Decision | 5 | 3:00 |
| 1995-01-29 | Draw | (Japan) Kenichi Sato | MA Nihon Kickboxing | Japan | Decision | 5 | 3:00 |
| 1992-11-13 | Win | (Japan) Hiroshi Yamada | MA Nihon Kickboxing "Saikou wo Hajimete 10" | Tokyo, Japan | Decision | 3 | 3:00 |
Legend: Win Loss Draw/No contest Notes
