= Koto Hiraoka =

Japanese kickboxer

- Born: 20 June 1990 (age 36); Yokohama, Japan
- Nickname: The Iron Lady of Hama
- Height: 1.55 m (5 ft 1 in)
- Weight: 47 kg (104 lb; 7 st 6 lb)
- Style: Kickboxing, Karate
- Stance: Orthodox
- Fighting out of: Machida, Tokyo, Japan
- Team: Kyokushinkaikan Yokohama North Branch (1999-2015); K-1 Gym Yokohama (2015-2017); TRY HARD (2017-present)
- Rank: Black belt in Kyokushin karate
- Years active: 2015 - present

Kickboxing record
- Total: 29
- Wins: 18
- By knockout: 3
- Losses: 10
- By knockout: 1
- Draws: 1

Other information
- Website: https://www.kotohiraoka.com/

Koto Hiraoka (Japanese: 平岡琴, Hiraoka Koto; born June 20, 1990) is a Japanese kickboxer, currently competing in the atomweight division of RISE. As of April 2024, she is ranked as the seventh-best women's atomweight kickboxer in the world by Beyond Kickboxing. She is the current Knock Out Black Atomweight champion.

== Professional career ==
=== Krush ===
Hiraoka made her professional kickboxing debut against the two-time K-1 Challenge tournament winner KANA at Krush 58 on September 12, 2015. The bout was contested at 50 kilograms. Hiraoka was twice knocked down, prior to being stopped with a right hook near the end of the second round.

Hiraoka faced Fumina Saito at Krush 62 on January 17, 2016. The fight was ruled a majority decision draw. Hiraoka next faced Yukari Matsui at Krush 67 on July 18, 2016. She won the fight by a first-round technical knockout. Hiraoka would extend her win streak to four fights with triumphs over Texas Ayumi at Krush 72 and Ayaka Miyauchi at Krush 76, which earned her a spot in the 2017 Krush Women's Atomweight tournament. Hiraoka faced Emi Matsushita at in the semifinal bout of the tournament at Krush 80 on September 8, 2017. She lost the fight by unanimous decision.

=== RISE ===
Hiraoka faced Shoko JSK at RISE 127 on September 16, 2018. She won the fight by a second-round technical knockout, first knocking her opponent down with a middle kick, before knocking her out with a spinning back kick.

Hiraoka faced Tomoko Hida at RISE 129 on September 17, 2018. She won the fight by unanimous decision, with scores of 30–28, 30–28 and 29–28.

Hiraoka faced Riri Nasukawa in the semifinals of the RISE Queen Atomweight tournament at RISE 131 on March 23, 2019. She lost the fight by unanimous decision.

Hiraoka faced Momoka Mandokoro at RISE WORLD SERIES 2019 Final Round on July 13, 2019. The fight was ruled a majority decision draw: two ringside officials scored the fight as an even 29–29, while the third judge scored it 29–28 in favor of Hiraoka. She won the fight by split decision, after an extra was contested.

Hiraoka faced Reina Sato at the inaugural RISE GIRLS POWER event on November 8, 2019. She won the fight by unanimous decision.

Hiraoka challenged Momi Furuta for the RISE Women's Atomweight title at RISE GIRLS POWER 2 on February 11, 2020. Despite knocking the champion down with a spinning heel kick in the third round, Hiraoka nonetheless lost the fight by unanimous decision, with scores of 48–47, 47–46 and 47–46.

Hiraoka made her REBELS debut against erika♡ at REBELS 65 on August 30, 2020. She lost the fight by unanimous decision, with all three judges scoring the fight 29–28 in favor of her opponent.

Hiraoka faced sasori at RISE DEAD OR ALIVE 2020 Yokohama on October 11, 2020, in the quarterfinals of the 2020 RISE Queen of Queens Tournament Quarter Final. Hiraoka stepped in as a short-notice replacement for Megami, who withdrew from the bout two-weeks prior with a right ulna fracture. She lost the fight by unanimous decision, with scores of 30–27, 30–27 and 30–28.

Hiraoka faced Arina Kobayashi at RISE 148 on April 17, 2021. She lost the fight by majority decision, with scores of 30–28, 30–29 and 29–29.

Hiraoka faced Nana Okuwaki at RISE GIRLS POWER 5 on September 12, 2021. She won the fight by unanimous decision, with three scorecards of 30–28 in her favor.

Hiraoka faced Suzuka Tabuchi at RISE GIRLS POWER 6 on February 12, 2022. She won the fight by unanimous decision, with three scorecards of 30–29 in her favor.

Hiraoka faced Momoka Mandokoro in a rematch at RISE 159 on June 24, 2022. She won the fight by unanimous decision, with scores of 30–28, 30–28 and 29–28.

Hiraoka faced Arina Kobayashi in an open-finger glove bout at RISE 163 on December 10, 2022. She lost the fight by unanimous decision, as all three judges scored the fight 29–28 in favor of Kobayashi.

Hiraoka faced Minori Kikuchi in another open-finger glove bout at RISE 167 on April 21, 2023. She won the fight by unanimous decision, with three scorecards of 30–28 in her favor.

Hiraoka next faced Honoka Kobayashi at RISE Fight Club on November 19, 2023, once again in an open-finger glove bout. She won the fight by unanimous decision, with scores of 30–27, 30–27 and 30–26. Hiraoka was able to knock Kobayashi down with a knee strike late in the third and final round.

Hiraoka faced the former Knock Out-Black Female Minimumweight Champion Panchan Rina at K-1 World MAX 2024 - World Tournament Opening Round on March 20, 2024. She lost the fight by Majority decision.

Hiraoka faced Su Yun-Ko at a RISExPunchUp crossover event on June 1, 2024. She won the fight by unanimous decision.

Hiraoka faced Haruka Shimada for the vacant RISE Women's Atomweight title at RISE 194 on December 14, 2025. She lost the fight by unanimous decision.

== Championships and accomplishments ==
=== Kickboxing ===
- Knock Out
  - 2026 Knock Out Black Atomweight (-46kg) Champion

Karate

- IKO Kyokushinkaikan
  - 2012 United States Weight Championships Lightweight (-55 kg) Runner-up
  - 2013 United States Weight Championships Lightweight (-55 kg) Third Place
  - 2014 All-Japan Weight Championships Lightweight (-55 kg) Champion
  - 2015 All-Japan Weight Championships Lightweight (-55 kg) Third Place

== Fight record ==
Kickboxing record
18 Wins (3 (T)KO's), 10 Losses, 1 Draw
Date	Result	Opponent	Event	Location	Method	Round	Time
2026-09-05	Win	(Japan) Mako Yamada	KNOCK OUT.68 ～KNOCKIN' on the WORLD～	Yokohama, Japan	Decision (Split)	3	3:00
Wins the Knock Out Black Atomweight (-46kg) Championship.
2025-12-14	Loss	(Japan) Haruka Shimada	RISE 194	Tokyo, Japan	Decision (Unanimous)	5	3:00
For the vacant RISE Women's Atomweight title.
2025-07-25	Win	(Japan) Honoka Tsujii	RISE 190	Tokyo, Japan	Ext.R Decision (Unanimous)	4	3:00
2024-12-15	Win	(Japan) Runa Okumura	RISE 184	Tokyo, Japan	Ext.R Decision (Unanimous)	4	3:00
2024-06-01	Win	(Taiwan) Su Yun-Ko	RISE x PunchUp	Hualien, Taiwan	Decision (Unanimous)	3	3:00
2024-03-20	Loss	(Japan) Panchan Rina	K-1 World MAX 2024 - World Tournament Opening Round	Tokyo, Japan	Decision (Majority)	3	3:00
2023-11-19	Win	(Japan) Honoka Kobayashi	RISE Fight Club	Tokyo, Japan	Decision (Unanimous)	3	3:00
2023-04-21	Win	(Japan) Minori Kikuchi	RISE 167	Tokyo, Japan	Decision (Unanimous)	3	3:00
2022-12-10	Loss	(Japan) Arina Kobayashi	RISE 163	Tokyo, Japan	Decision (Unanimous)	3	3:00
2022-06-24	Win	(Japan) Momoka Mandokoro	RISE 159	Tokyo, Japan	Decision (Unanimous)	3	3:00
2022-02-12	Win	(Japan) Suzuka Tabuchi	RISE GIRLS POWER 6	Tokyo, Japan	Decision (Unanimous)	3	3:00
2021-09-12	Win	(Japan) Nana Okuwaki	RISE GIRLS POWER 5	Tokyo, Japan	Decision (Unanimous)	3	3:00
2021-04-17	Loss	(Japan) Arina Kobayashi	RISE 148	Tokyo, Japan	Decision (Majority)	3	3:00
2020-10-11	Loss	(Japan) sasori	RISE DEAD OR ALIVE 2020 Yokohama - Queen of Queens Tournament, Quarterfinals	Yokohama, Japan	Decision (Unanimous)	3	3:00
2020-08-30	Loss	(Japan) erika♡	REBELS 65	Tokyo, Japan	Decision (Unanimous)	3	3:00
2020-02-11	Loss	(Japan) Momi Furuta	RISE GIRLS POWER 2	Tokyo, Japan	Decision (Unanimous)	5	3:00
For the RISE Women's Atomweight title.
2019-11-08	Win	(Japan) Reina Sato	RISE GIRLS POWER	Tokyo, Japan	Decision (Unanimous)	3	3:00
2019-09-16	Win	(Japan) Momoka Mandokoro	RISE WORLD SERIES 2019 Final Round	Tokyo, Japan	Ext. R. Decision (Split)	3	3:00
2019-07-13	Win	(South Korea) Kim Hyun Joo	RISE Versus MKF	Tokyo, Japan	TKO (Knee injury)	3	0:10
2019-03-23	Loss	(Japan) Riri Nasukawa	RISE 131, Tournament Semifinal	Tokyo, Japan	Decision (Unanimous)	3	3:00
2018-11-17	Win	(Japan) Tomoko Hida	RISE 129	Tokyo, Japan	Decision (Unanimous)	3	3:00
2018-09-16	Win	(Japan) Shoko JSK	RISE 127	Tokyo, Japan	KO (Spinning back kick)	2	2:44
2017-09-08	Loss	(Japan) Emi Matsushita	Krush 80, Tournament Semifinal	Tokyo, Japan	Decision (Unanimous)	3	3:00
2017-05-28	Win	(Japan) Ayaka Miyauchi	Krush 76	Tokyo, Japan	Decision (Majority)	3	3:00
2017-01-15	Win	(Japan) Texas Ayumi	Krush 72	Tokyo, Japan	Decision (Unanimous)	3	3:00
2016-09-30	Win	(Japan) Yukari Takara	Krush 69	Tokyo, Japan	Decision (Unanimous)	3	3:00
2016-07-18	Win	(Japan) Yukari Matsui	Krush 67	Tokyo, Japan	TKO (Punches)	1	0:43
2016-01-17	Draw	(Japan) Fumina Saito	Krush 62	Tokyo, Japan	Decision (Majority)	3	2:00
2015-09-12	Loss	(Japan) KANA	Krush 58	Tokyo, Japan	KO (Right hook)	2	2:54
Legend: Win Loss Draw/No contest Notes

== See also ==
- List of female kickboxers
