= Yosuke Morii =

Japanese kickboxer

- Born: 森井洋介; July 30, 1988 (age 38); Ueda, Japan
- Other names: Mr. Knock Out
- Nationality: Japanese
- Height: 170 cm (5 ft 7 in)
- Weight: 61.0 kg (134.5 lb; 9.61 st)
- Style: Kickboxing
- Stance: Orthodox
- Fighting out of: Osaka, Japan
- Team: Fujiwara Gym (2008-2015); Golden Globe (2016-2018); Stray Dog Dojo (2019-2023)
- Years active: 2008 - 2023

Kickboxing record
- Total: 63
- Wins: 47
- By knockout: 31
- Losses: 11
- By knockout: 6
- Draws: 5

Yosuke Morii (Japanese: 森井洋介, Morii Yosuke; born July 30, 1988) is a Japanese muay thai kickboxer. A professional competitor since 2008, he is the former KNOCK OUT Lightweight champion and the former WPMF and WBC Muaythai Japan featherweight champion.

== Professional career ==
=== Early career ===
Morii made his professional debut against Koki Oonishi at AJKF CUB☆KICK’S－9 on February 9, 2008. The fight was ruled a draw by majority decision. Morii was then booked to face Yuichiro Katsumata at M-1 FAIRTEX SINGHA BEERFreshmans in Oomori on April 6, 2008. He won the fight by unanimous decision. Morii returned to AJKF at AJKF Norainu Dengekisakusen on June 22, 2008, to face Rikiya Oomae. He won the fight by unanimous decision.

Morii faced Fudo Myo-o at AJKF Fighting Base 1 on August 22, 2008. He won the fight by a second-round knockout, flooring Myo-o with a left hook. After notching the first stoppage victory of his career, Morii faced Hayato Uesugi at AJKF Fighting Base 2 on October 3, 2008. He won the fight by unanimous decision. Morii made his sixth appearance of the year against Takahiro Horiguchi at AJKF Fujiwara Matsuri 2008 on December 5, 2008. He won the fight by unanimous decision.

Morii participated in the Krush K-1 rules Rookies Cup, the quarter and semifinals of which were held on February 1, 2009. Morii faced Rikiya Oomae in the first bout of the tournament, and beat him by a unanimous decision, with all three judges scoring the fight 30–28 in his favor. Advancing to the tournament semifinals, Morii faced Mitsutoshi Kurata. He won the fight by a second-round knockout, stopping Kurata with a right hook to the body. Morii faced Takuya Shirahama in the tournament finals on March 14, 2009. He lost the fight by unanimous decision, with all three judges scoring the fight 29–27 for Shirahama.

Morii faced Makoto Kushima at AJKF Norainu Dengekisakusen 2009 on June 21, 2009. He won the fight by a third-round technical knockout. Morii was next booked to face Takeyuki at Krush Lightweight Grand Prix 2009～ Round.1 on July 24, 2009. He won the fight by unanimous decision, with all three judge awarding him a 30–26 scorecard. Morii made his second consecutive Krush appearance against Hiroshi Iwakiri at Krush-EX ～Innocent Fighter～ on October 12, 2009. He won the fight by unanimous decision.

=== Regional muaythai championships ===
Morii faced Hideya Nagasaki at Fujiwara Matsuri 2009 on December 11, 2009. He won the fight by unanimous decision, with all three judges scoring the fight 30–28 in his favor. Morii next faced Kenshiro Chiba at Tanikawa Gym 25th Anivversary BigBang on March 28, 2010. He won the fight by a second-round knockout. Morii was booked to face Kompayak Weerasakreck at M-1 RAJA BOXING SINGHA BEER Muay Thai Challenge NAI KANOMTOM vol.2 on June 6, 2010. He won the fight by unanimous decision, with all three judges scoring the fight 29–26 for him. Morii faced Ryo Pegasus, in his third fight of the year, at M-1 FAIRTEX Singha Beer Muay Thai Challenge NAI KANOMTOM vol.3 on September 12, 2010.

==== WPMF Japan featherweight champion ====
Morii was booked to face Reio for the interim WPMF Japan featherweight title at Fujiwara Matsuri 2010 on December 1, 2010. He won the fight by a first-round technical knockout, after knocking Reio down three times by the 2:55 minute mark of the opening rounds. Morii was booked to unify the WPMF titles with the regular champion Hiroki Nagashima at M-1 FAIRTEX RAORAK MUAY vol.1 on April 10, 2011. He won the fight by a fifth-round technical knockout, as the fight was stopped by the ringside physician due to a cut above Nagashima's left eye.

Morii faced Suwannoi Acegym at M-1 FAIRTEX RAORAK MUAY vol.2 on June 12, 2011. The fight was ruled a draw by split decision. Morii next faced the former WBO super bantamweight champion Ratanachai Sor.Vorapin at M-1 FAIRTEX RAORAK MUAY vol.3 on September 11, 2011. He won the fight by a first-round knockout, stopping Ratanachai with a right low kick. Morii made his REBELS debut against Kuwanek Kitakampon at REBELS 9 on October 23, 2011. He won the fight by a third-round knockout. Morii was then booked to face Genji Umeno at Fujiwara Matsuri 2011 Fuyu no Jin on December 12, 2011. He lost the fight by unanimous decision, with all three judges awarding all five rounds of the bout to Umeno.

==== WPMF and WBC Japan featherweight champion ====
Morii challenged the reigning WBC Muaythai Japan featherweight champion Heihachi Nakajima at NJKF KICK TO THE FUTURE 2 on April 29, 2012. He won the fight by a fifth-round knockout. Morii faced Masato Sato in a non-title bout at M-1 Sutt Yod Muaythai vol.2 on June 24, 2012. He won the fight by unanimous decision. Morii made his first WPMF Japan featherweight title defense against Hiroki Nagashima at REBELS 12 on July 29, 2012. The bout was a rematch of their April 10, 2011 meeting, which Morii won by a fifth-round technical knockout. Morii successfully retained his title by a narrow unanimous decision, with scores of 49–48, 48–47 and 49–48.

Morii was booked to make his first WBC Muaythai featherweight title defense against Hiroki Akimoto at MA Japan Kick BREAK-30 ～UNIFICATION～ on October 7, 2012. He lost the fight by unanimous decision, with scores of 49–48, 49–47 and 50–47. After failing in his first title defense, Morii was scheduled to face Pornsanae Sitmonchai at RISE/M-1 ~Infinity.II~ on January 6, 2013. The fight was ruled a split decision draw. Morii made his second WPMF Japan featherweight title defense against SHIGERU at M-FIGHT, Part.2 on May 25, 2013. He lost the fight by majority decision.

Morii faced Munfang Por.Poonsawan at MAX MUAYTHAI 2013 JAPAN on October 6, 2013. He won the fight by a second-round knockout.

=== First kickboxing titles ===
==== BigBang ====
Morii faced Shunta for the inaugural BigBang Super Featherweight title at BigBang 15 on December 1, 2013, in his promotional debut. He won the fight by a fifth-round knockout. After successfully capturing his first kickboxing title, Morii was booked to face Rungpet Kaiyanghadao in a non-title bout at Fujiwara Matsuri on June 19, 2014. He won the fight by a second-round spinning elbow knockout. Morii made his first BigBang title defense against Fire Hiroshi at BigBang 18 on September 7, 2014. He won the fight by a third-round knockout, flooring Hiroshi with a right straight at the 2:45 minute mark.

Morii faced Ilias Ennahachi at KICKBOXING ZONE on November 9, 2014. He won the fight by a first-round knockout, stopping Ennaahachi with a left hook. Morii extended his winning streak to six fights after beating Densiam lookprabat by unanimous decision at NO KICK NO LIFE 2015 on February 11, 2015. Morii next faced Singtongnoi Por.Telakun at WPMF JAPAN×REBELS SUK WEERASAKRECK FAIRTEX on March 22, 2015. He lost the fight by a fifth-round head kick knockout.

==== ZONE ====
Morii made his ZONE debut against Maki Pinsiam at ZONE 2 on May 2, 2015. Maki won the fight by majority decision, with scores of 49–47, 48–48 and 49–48. Morii made his second promotional appearance at ZONE 3 on September 13, 2015, against Super Crazy K. He snapped his two-fight losing streak with a first-round technical knockout of K, whom he stopped with repeated low kicks. Morii faced Armin Sasiprapa at Muay Thai Open 33 on December 13, 2015, in his final fight of the year. He won the bout by a third-round knockout.

Morii was booked to face Hikaru Machida at NO KICK NO LIFE 2016 on March 12, 2016. He won the fight by a fourth-round technical knockout. Two months later, on May 1, 2016, Morii participated in the AJFK ZONE super featherweight tournament. He was booked to face Kazu Nakamura in the semifinals of the one-day tournament. Morii won the opening bout by unanimous decision, with scores of 30–27, 30–28 and 30–28. Morii advanced to the tournament finals, where he faced Dynamo☆Ranger. He knocked Ranger down three times by the 1:55 minute mark of the opening round, which earned him an automatic technical knockout victory.

Morii faced Chao Rocket at NO KICK NO LIFE ～THE FINAL～ on June 24, 2016. He won the fight by unanimous decision, with scores of 49–47, 50–47 and 50–46.

=== KNOCK OUT ===
==== Early promotional career ====
Morii faced Kazuma Takahashi at KNOCK OUT inaugural show, held on September 14, 2016. He won the fight by a first-round knockout, stopping Takahashi with a flurry of punches at the 2:50 minute mark. Morii faced Yodwandee Sawchanatip at KNOCK OUT vol.0 on December 5, 2016. He stopped Yodwandee with a right elbow strike in the second round. Morii's nine fight winning streak was stopped at KNOCK OUT vol.1 on February 12, 2017, as his fight with Hirotoshi Murata was ruled a split decision draw.

==== Lightweight tournament ====
Morii participated in the 2017 KNOCK OUT lightweight tournament, held to crown the inaugural champion. Morii faced Keijiro Miyakoshi at KNOCK OUT vol.2 on April 1, 2017, in the tournament quarterfinals. He won the fight by a second-round knockout, stopping Miyakoshi with a flurry of punches 18 seconds into the round. As the semifinals weren't planned to take place until October, Morii fought in two non-tournament bouts. He was first booked to face Juan Mario Kaewsamrit at KNOCK OUT vol.3 on June 17, 2017, whom he beat by a third-round technical knockout. Morii next faced Gi Hoon Joo at KNOCK OUT vol.4 on August 20, 2017. He won the fight by a third-round knockout.

Morii faced Hikaru Machida at KNOCK OUT vol.5 on October 14, 2017, in the semifinal bout of the lightweight tournament. He won the fight by a second-round technical knockout. The fight was stopped on the advice of the ringside doctor, due to a cut above Machida's left eye. Morii advanced to the tournament finals, held at KING OF KNOCK OUT 2017 on December 10, 2017, where he faced Katsuji. He won the fight by a third-round knockout. Aside from winning the tournament, Morii was awarded the KNOCK OUT Lightweight Championship, as well as the ¥3,000,000 prize.

Morii was booked to make his first KNOCK OUT lightweight title defense against the former two-time Rajadamnern Stadium lightweight champion Yodlekpet Or. Pitisak. The bout was booked as the event headliner for KNOCK OUT Sakura Burst, which took place on April 14, 2018, at the Culttz Kawasaki in Kawasaki, Japan. He lost the fight by a second-round technical knockout. The fight was stopped on the advice of the ringside physician at the 1:15 minute mark of the second round, due to a broken nose.

==== Continued career ====
After suffering his first loss under the KNOCK OUT banner, Morii was booked to face the former Krush lightweight champion Haruaki Otsuki at KNOCK OUT SUMMER FES.2018 on August 19, 2018. He won the fight by a third-round knockout. Morii next faced Kiyosonsen Flyskygym at KNOCK OUT 2018 cross over on October 7, 2018. He won the fight by knockout, 47 seconds into the extension round. Morii faced Masa Sato at KING OF KNOCK OUT 2018 on December 9, 2018, in his final fight of the year. He won it by a fourth-round knockout, stopping Sato with low kicks.

Morii faced the RISE Super Featherweight champion Chan Hyung Lee at KNOCK OUT 2019 WINTER on February 11, 2019. He lost the fight by a second-round technical knockout. Morii next faced the prospect Kento Haraguchi at JAPAN KICKBOXING INNOVATION on November 17, 2019. He lost the fight by a third-round technical knockout.

=== NO KICK NO LIFE ===
Morii made his promotional return to NO KICK NO LIFE against Shoki at NO KICK NO LIFE ~Shin Shou~ on October 29, 2020, following an eleven-month absence from the sport. He won the fight by a third-round technical knockout.

Morii faced Kiyomitsu Samuel Nagasawa at NO KICK NO LIFE ~Shin Shou~ Ungaisouten on February 24, 2021. He won the fight by a majority decision, with scores of 30–28, 29–29 and 30–29. Morii faced Taison Maeguchi at NO KICK NO LIFE Shin Shou Yuigadokuson on July 22, 2021, in his second and final fight of the year. He won the bout by a second-round spinning elbow knockout.

Morii faced the two-time WBC Muaythai Japan welterweight champion Kenta Yamada at the January 9, 2022 NO KICK NO LIFE event. He won the fight by unanimous decision, with scores of 48–47, 50–47 and 50–47.

Morii was booked to face Lom Isan REON at Chakuriki 15 Fujiwara Festival on April 27, 2022. He lost the fight by unanimous decision, after an extra round was fought.

Morii faced Haruto Yasumoto at NO KICK NO LIFE on May 28, 2022. He lost the fight by a third-round knockout.

== Titles and accomplishments ==
=== Muay thai ===
- WPMF
  - 2010 interim WPMF Japan Featherweight Championship
  - 2011 WPMF Japan Featherweight Championship
    - One successful title defense
- WBC Muaythai
  - 2012 WBC Muay Thai Japan Featherweight Championship
- KNOCK OUT
  - 2017 KNOCK OUT Lightweight Tournament Winner
  - 2017 KNOCK OUT Lightweight Championship

=== Kickboxing ===
- BigBang
  - 2014 BigBang Super Featherweight Championship
    - One successful title defense
- All Japan Kickboxing Federation
  - 2009 AJKF Rookies Cup K-1 Lightweight Tournament runner-up
  - 2016 AJKF ZONE Super Featherweight Tournament Winner

Awards

- eFight.jp
  - 2x Fighter of the Month (January and December 2013)

== Fight record ==
Professional Kickboxing Record
47 Wins (31 (T)KO's), 12 Losses, 5 Draws, 0 No Contest
Date	Result	Opponent	Event	Location	Method	Round	Time
2022-05-28	Loss	(Japan) Haruto Yasumoto	NO KICK NO LIFE	Tokyo, Japan	KO (High kick)	3	2:18
2022-04-27	Loss	(Thailand) Lom Isan REON	Chakuriki 15 Fujiwara Festival	Tokyo, Japan	Ext. R. Decision (Unanimous)	4	3:00
2022-01-09	Win	(Japan) Kenta Yamada	NO KICK NO LIFE	Tokyo, Japan	Decision (Unanimous)	5	3:00
2021-07-22	Win	(Japan) Taison Maeguchi	NO KICK NO LIFE Shin Shou Yuigadokuson	Tokyo, Japan	KO (Spinning Elbow)	2	3:00
2021-02-24	Win	(Japan) Kiyomitsu Samuel Nagasawa	NO KICK NO LIFE ~Shin Shou~ Ungaisouten	Tokyo, Japan	Decision (Majority)	3	3:00
2020-10-29	Win	(Japan) Shoki Nishikawa	NO KICK NO LIFE ~Shin Shou~	Tokyo, Japan	TKO (Punches)	3	0:43
2019-11-17	Loss	(Japan) Kento Haraguchi	JAPAN KICKBOXING INNOVATION	Okayama, Japan	TKO (High Kick + punches)	3	0:34
2019-02-11	Loss	(Korea) Chan Hyung Lee	KNOCK OUT 2019 WINTER	Tokyo, Japan	TKO (Punches)	2	1:21
2018-12-09	Win	(Japan) Masa Sato	KING OF KNOCK OUT 2018	Tokyo, Japan	KO (Low Kick)	4	0:33
2018-10-07	Win	(Thailand) Kiewsongsaen Flyskygym	KNOCK OUT 2018 cross over	Tokyo, Japan	KO (Body Punches)	6	0:47
2018-08-19	Win	(Japan) Haruaki Otsuki	KNOCK OUT SUMMER FES.2018	Tokyo, Japan	KO (Punches)	3	2:52
2018-04-14	Loss	(Thailand) Yodlekpet Or. Pitisak	KNOCK OUT Sakura Burst	Kawasaki, Japan	TKO (Doctor Stop./Broken nose)	2	1:15
Lost the KNOCK OUT Lightweight Championship.
2017-12-10	Win	(Japan) Katsuji Takahashi	KING OF KNOCK OUT 2017, Lightweight Tournament Final	Tokyo, Japan	KO (Punches)	3	1:12
Wins KNOCK OUT Lightweight Tournament and inaugural KNOCK OUT Lightweight Championship.
2017-10-04	Win	(Japan) Hikaru Machida	KNOCK OUT vol.5, Lightweight Tournament Semi Final	Tokyo, Japan	TKO (Doctor Stoppage/Cut)	2	2:18
2017-08-20	Win	(Korea) Gi Hoon Joo	KNOCK OUT vol.4	Tokyo, Japan	KO (Punches)	3	0:49
2017-06-17	Win	(Spain) Juan Mario Kaewsamrit	KNOCK OUT vol.3	Tokyo, Japan	TKO (Corner Stoppage)	3	1:19
2017-04-01	Win	(Japan) Keijiro Miyakoshi	KNOCK OUT vol.2, Lightweight Tournament Quarter Final	Tokyo, Japan	KO (Punches)	2	0:18
2017-02-12	Draw	(Japan) Hirotoshi Murata	KNOCK OUT vol.1	Tokyo, Japan	Decision (Split)	5	3:00
2016-12-05	Win	(Thailand) Yodwandee Sawchanatip	KNOCK OUT vol.0	Tokyo, Japan	KO (Right Elbow)	2	1:54
2016-09-14	Win	(Japan) Kazuma Takahashi	KNOCK OUT	Tokyo, Japan	KO (Punches)	1	2:50
2016-06-24	Win	(Thailand) Chao Rocket	NO KICK NO LIFE ～THE FINAL～	Tokyo, Japan	Decision (Unanimous)	5	3:00
2016-05-01	Win	(Japan) Dynamo☆Ranger	ZONE 4, Final	Kanagawa, Japan	TKO (3 Knockdowns)	1	1:55
Won the 2016 AJKF ZONE Super Featherweight Tournament.
2016-05-01	Win	(Japan) Kazu Nakamura	ZONE 4, Semi Final	Kanagawa, Japan	Decision (Unanimous)	3	3:00
2016-03-12	Win	(Japan) Hikaru Machida	NO KICK NO LIFE 2016	Tokyo, Japan	TKO (Doctor Stoppage)	4	0:13
2015-12-13	Win	(Thailand) Armin Sasiprapa	Muay Thai Open 33	Tokyo, Japan	KO (Left hook to the body)	3	
2015-10-16	Win	(Australia) Cain Brunton	BRUTE FORCE 33 COLLISION	Australia	KO	2	
2015-09-13	Win	(Japan) Super Crazy K	ZONE 3	Kanagawa, Japan	TKO (Low kicks)	1	2:00
2015-05-02	Loss	(Thailand) Pinsiam Sor.Amnuaysirichoke	ZONE 2	Kanagawa, Japan	Decision (Majority)	5	3:00
2015-03-22	Loss	(Thailand) Singtongnoi Por.Telakun	WPMF JAPAN×REBELS SUK WEERASAKRECK FAIRTEX	Tokyo, Japan	KO (High Kick)	5	2:40
2015-02-11	Win	(Thailand) Densiam Lukprabat	NO KICK NO LIFE 2015	Tokyo, Japan	Decision (Unanimous)	5	3:00
2014-11-09	Win	(Netherlands) Ilias Ennahachi	KICKBOXING ZONE	Japan	KO (Left Hook)	1	2:40
2014-09-07	Win	(Japan) Fire Hiroshi	BigBang 18	Tokyo, Japan	KO (Straight Right)	3	2:45
Defends BigBang Super Featherweight Title.
2014-06-19	Win	(Thailand) Rungpet Kaiyanghadao	Fujiwara Matsuri	Japan	KO (Spinning Elbow)	2	2:15
2013-12-01	Win	(Japan) Shunta	BigBang 15	Tokyo, Japan	KO (Left Hook)	5	
Wins inaugural BigBang Super Featherweight title.
2013-10-06	Win	(Thailand) Munfang Por.Poonsawan	MAX MUAYTHAI 2013 JAPAN	Sendai, Japan	KO (Right hook)	2	
2013-05-26	Loss	(Japan) SHIGERU	M-FIGHT, Part.2	Tokyo, Japan	Decision (Majority)	5	3:00
For the WPMF World Super Featherweight Title.
2013-01-06	Draw	(Thailand) Pornsanae Sitmonchai	RISE/M-1 ~Infinity.II~	Tokyo, Japan	Decision (split)	5	3:00
2012-10-07	Loss	(Japan) Hiroki Akimoto	MA Japan Kick BREAK-30 ～UNIFICATION～	Tokyo, Japan	Decision (Unanimous)	5	3:00
Lost WBC Muay Thai Japan Featherweight title.
2012-07-29	Win	(Japan) Hiroki Nagashima	REBELS 12	Tokyo, Japan	Decision (Unanimous)	5	3:00
Defends WPMF Japan Featherweight Title.
2012-06-24	Win	(Japan) Masato Sato	M-1 Sutt Yod Muaythai vol.2	Tokyo, Japan	Decision (Unanimous)	3	3:00
2012-04-29	Win	(Japan) Heihachi Nakajima	NJKF KICK TO THE FUTURE 2	Tokyo, Japan	KO (Punches)	5	2:31
Wins WBC Muay Thai Japan Featherweight title.
2012-02-24	Loss	(Thailand) Fameechai Sipputar	Lumpinee Stadium	Bangkok, Thailand	TKO	3	
2011-12-22	Loss	(Japan) Genji Umeno	Fujiwara Matsuri 2011 Fuyu no Jin	Tokyo, Japan	Decision (Decision)	5	3:00
2011-10-23	Win	(Thailand) Kuwanek Kitakampon	REBELS 9	Tokyo, Japan	KO (Knee and puches)	3	1:49
2011-09-11	Win	(Thailand) Ratanachai Sor Vorapin	M-1 FAIRTEX RAORAK MUAY vol.3	Japan	KO (Right low kick)	1	2:09
2011-06-12	Draw	(Thailand) Suwannoi Acegym	M-1 FAIRTEX RAORAK MUAY vol.2	Japan	Decision (Split)	5	3:00
2011-04-10	Win	(Japan) Hiroki Nagashima	M-1 FAIRTEX RAORAK MUAY vol.1	Japan	TKO (Doctor stoppage)	5	2:02
Wins WPMF Japan Featherweight title.
2010-12-01	Win	(Japan) Reio	Fujiwara Matsuri 2010	Japan	TKO (Three knockdowns)	1	2:55
Wins interim WPMF Japan Featherweight Title.
2010-09-12	Win	(Japan) Ryo Pegasus	M-1 FAIRTEX Singha Beer Muay Thai Challenge NAI KANOMTOM vol.3	Japan	Decision (Unanimous)	3	3:00
2010-06-06	Win	(Thailand) Kompayak Weerasakreck	M-1 RAJA BOXING SINGHA BEER Muay Thai Challenge NAI KANOMTOM vol.2	Japan	Decision (Unanimous)	3	3:00
2010-03-28	Win	(Japan) Kenshiro Chiba	Tanikawa Gym 25th Anivversary BigBang	Japan	KO (Right hook)	2	0:55
2009-12-11	Win	(Japan) Hideya Nagasaki	Fujiwara Matsuri 2009	Japan	Decision (Unanimous)	3	3:00
2009-10-12	Win	(Japan) Hiroshi Iwakiri	Krush-EX ～Innocent Fighter～	Japan	Decision (Unanimous)	3	3:00
2009-07-24	Win	(Japan) Takeyuki	Krush Lightweight Grand Prix 2009～ Round.1	Japan	Decision (Unanimous)	3	3:00
2009-06-21	Win	(Japan) Makoto Kushima	AJKF Norainu Dengekisakusen 2009	Japan	TKO (Doctor Stoppage)	3	2:21
2009-03-14	Loss	(Japan) Takuya Shirahama	AJKF Krush 2, Rookies Cup ～K-1 Rule 60 kg Tournament Final	Japan	Decision (Unanimous)	3	3:00
For the AJKF Rookies Cup K-1 title.
2009-02-01	Win	(Japan) Mitsutoshi Kurata	AJKF Krush, Rookies Cup ～K-1 Rule 60 kg Tournament Semi Final	Japan	TKO (Right hook to the body)	2	2:47
2009-02-01	Win	(Japan) Rikiya Oomae	AJKF Krush, Rookies Cup ～K-1 Rule 60 kg Tournament Quarter Final	Japan	Decision (Unanimous)	3	3:00
2008-12-05	Win	(Japan) Takahiro Horiguchi	AJKF Fujiwara Matsuri 2008	Japan	Decision (Unanimous)	3	3:00
2008-10-03	Win	(Japan) Hayato Uesugi	AJKF Fighting Base 2	Japan	Decision (Unanimous)	3	3:00
2008-08-22	Win	(Japan) Fudo Myo-o	AJKF Fighting Base 1	Japan	KO (Left hook)	2	1:49
2008-06-22	Win	(Japan) Rikiya Oomae	AJKF Norainu Dengekisakusen	Japan	Decision (Unanimous)	3	3:00
2008-04-06	Win	(Japan) Yuichiro Katsumata	M-1 FAIRTEX SINGHA BEERFreshmans in Oomori	Japan	Decision (Unanimous)	3	3:00
2008-02-09	Draw	(Japan) Koki Oonishi	AJKF CUB☆KICK’S－9	Japan	Decision (Majority)	3	3:00
Legend: Win Loss Draw/No contest Notes

== See also ==
- List of male kickboxers
