= Panchan Rina =

Japanese professional kickboxer (born 1994)

- Born: Rina Okamoto; March 17, 1994 (age 32); Toyonaka, Osaka, Japan
- Native name: ぱんちゃん 璃奈
- Other names: Cutie Striker
- Height: 165 cm (5 ft 5 in)
- Weight: 48 kg (106 lb; 7 st 8 lb)
- Division: Atomweight (2019–2021); Minimumweight (2022–present)
- Style: Kickboxing
- Teacher: Hideaki Suzuki
- Years active: 2017–present

Kickboxing record
- Total: 25
- Wins: 21
- By knockout: 6
- Losses: 3
- Draws: 1

Amateur record
- Total: 12
- Wins: 11
- Losses: 1

Other information
- Website: www.panchanrina.com
- Last updated on: October 23, 2026

Rina Okamoto (Japanese: 岡本 璃奈, Hepburn: Okamoto Rina; born March 17, 1994), better known as Panchan Rina (ぱんちゃん 璃奈, Pan-chan Rina), is a Japanese professional kickboxer. She is a former Knock Out-Black Female Minimumweight Champion, Knock Out-Black Female Atomweight Champion, and Rebels-Black Women's 46 kg Champion. After moving from Osaka to Tokyo at the age of 21, Rina discovered kickboxing and began competing at the amateur level in 2017. She made her professional debut in February 2019 and was undefeated as a professional until May 2024. As of July 2025, she was ranked the number four -47 kg kickboxer and the number five -50 kg kickboxer in the world by Beyond Kickboxing.

== Early life and amateur career ==
Rina was born in Toyonaka, Osaka Prefecture on March 17, 1994, as the youngest of three children. With one older brother and one older sister, she said she was spoiled. Rina started swimming at the age of five and continued for 10 years. She suffered from atopic dermatitis, and also said her low body fat percentage made her unsuited for the sport. Her parents wanted her to be an actress, and had her audition for commercials from the age of six. But Rina said she was restless and could never sit through an audition. In sixth grade, Rina's parents had her audition for the original AKB48. She made it to the final interview, but declined it as she was not interested in being an idol. In junior high, Rina broke her school's marathon record three consecutive years in a row and was scouted to join the track and field club in her final year of junior high. However, she had to give up the sport after suffering a stress fracture in high school from excessive running. Without many friends and unable to play sports, the only thing she cared about, Rina stopped going to school and eventually quit.

Living on her own since the age of 17, she wandered from place to place working part-time jobs. At 21, she decided to move to Tokyo for a fresh start. There, she discovered kickboxing. Although it began as exercise, Rina quickly had the desire to compete, feeling that she "was born" to be a kickboxer. She joined the gym Struggle, founded by former professional kickboxer Hideaki Suzuki, on March 1, 2017. She traveled to Thailand several times to train and fight in Muay Thai. As an amateur, Rina was the 2018 Girls Bloom Cup -50 kg Champion and the Kaminarimon All Japan 2018 47 kg Champion. Her amateur record was 11 wins and 1 loss.

Rina's nickname comes from the Dragon Ball character Pan. While watching Dragon Ball together on Rina's 20th birthday, a friend told her she looked like the character. Elated, Rina changed her social media handle to "Panchan" and everyone started calling her by the name. The character is most prominently featured in Dragon Ball GT, and Rina uses that anime's theme song, "Dan Dan Kokoro Hikareteku", as her entrance music.

== Professional career ==
=== 2019–2022: Debut and two-division championships ===
Rina made her professional debut facing high school student Erisa Kawashima at Pancrase Rebels Ring 1 Night on February 17, 2019, with the winner earning a multi-fight contract with Rebels. Rina won the fight by unanimous decision. For her second match, Rina faced Sae_KMG at Rebels 60 on April 20, 2019. It was contested under Rebels' Muay Thai rules, which allow elbows. Rina won by unanimous decision. At Rebels 61 on June 9, 2019, Rina had a kickboxing match against mixed martial artist Si Woo Park. She won by unanimous decision. In her fourth professional match, first with three-minute-long rounds, Rina faced Shoko at K.O Climax 2019 Summer Kick Fever on August 18, 2019. Although it was put on by the Knock Out promotion, the match used Rebels Muay Thai rules. Rina won the bout by majority decision. In another Rebels Muay Thai rules fight, Rina faced J-Girls Pinweight Champion Mirey at Knock Out × Rebels on October 4, 2019, and won by unanimous decision. On December 8, 2019, Rina faced Petchompoo Mor Krungthepthonburi at Shin Nihon Kickboxing Association's Soul in the Ring Climax. The doctor stopped the match at 2:20 of round one due to a cut on Mor Krungthepthonburi, earning Rina her first technical knockout.

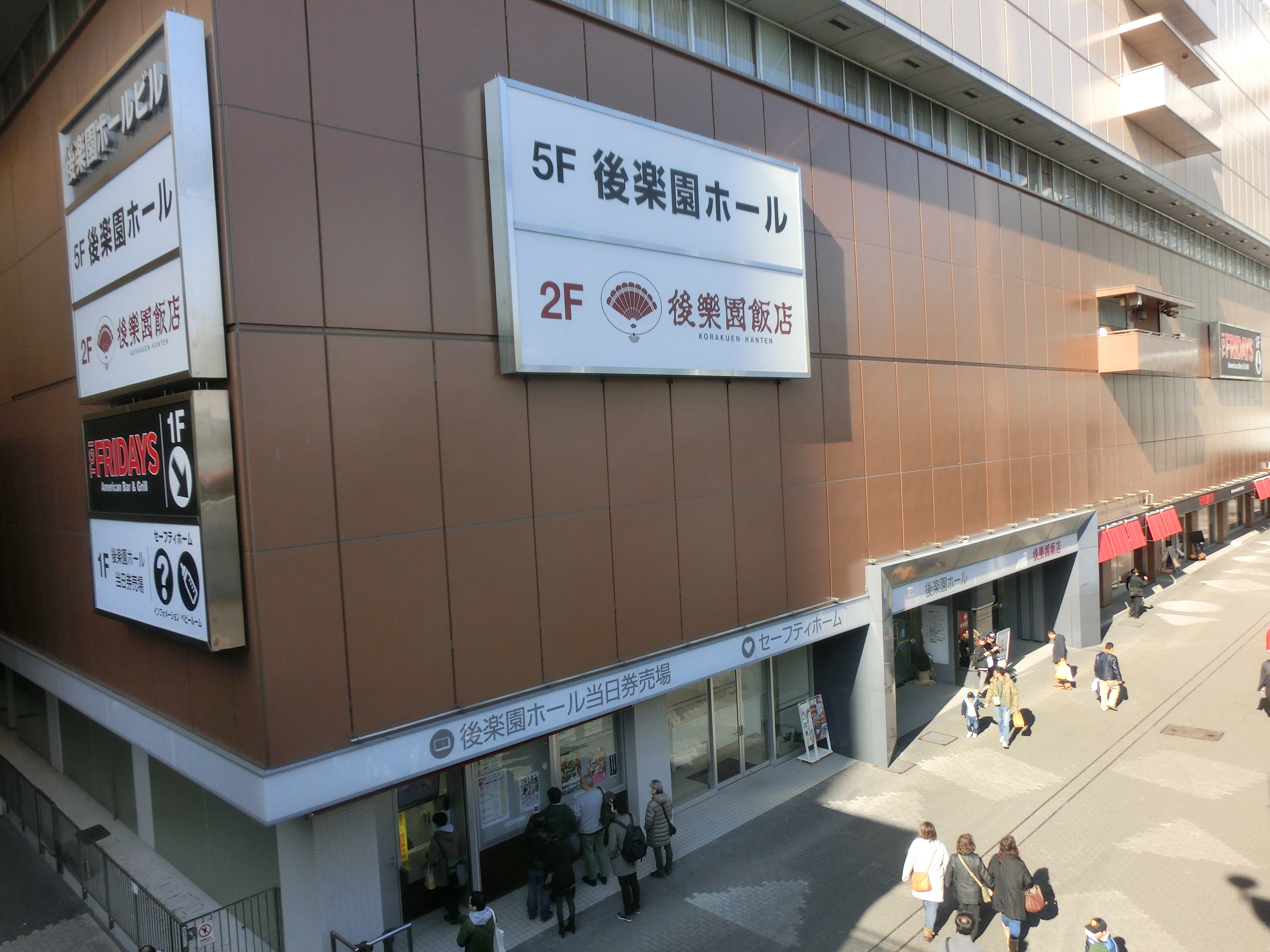
Most of Rina's matches have taken place at Korakuen Hall.

Because one of the judges scored their previous bout a draw, Rina requested a rematch with Shoko. It took place at Knock Out Championship 1 on February 11, 2020, with Rina winning by unanimous decision. Rebels then announced that Rina would face shoot boxer and former J-Girls Miniflyweight Champion Misaki for the inaugural Rebels-Black Women's 46 kg Championship as the co-main event of Rebels 65. The match was sponsored by the manga series Taiga of Genesis, with the winner receiving an additional ¥200,000 from its author. Originally set for April 24, 2020, the event was rescheduled three times due to the COVID-19 pandemic in Japan, finally taking place on August 30, 2020. Rina won the match, and her first professional championship, by unanimous decision. In her first main event, Rina faced former Minerva Pinweight Champion Mari in a non-title match at Rebels 67 on November 8, 2020. She won the 47 kg bout by unanimous decision. Later that month, Rina underwent surgery on her right hand due to an injury she sustained in the fight.

At a New Years awards ceremony held by Rebels and Knock Out in January 2021, Rina received the Outstanding Performance Award for her performances in the previous year. In March 2021, Rebels was merged into the Knock Out promotion and Rina's Rebels-Black Women's 46 kg Championship became the Knock Out-Black Female Atomweight Championship. After being postponed because of the continued COVID-19 pandemic, Rina made her return to competition in a rematch with Mirey, the J-Girls and WMC Japan Pinweight Champion, at Knock Out 2021 Vol. 2 on May 22, 2021. She won the non-title fight at 2:30 of the first round, with the first proper knockout of her career. She also received a ¥200,000 win bonus sponsored by Taiga of Genesis. After requesting a match against Minerva Light Flyweight Champion Hitomi "Sasori" Nagai for 10 months, Rina finally faced her at Knock Out 2021 Vol. 3 on July 18, 2021. Rina won the 48.4 kg bout by majority decision. She also received another ¥200,000 win bonus sponsored by Taiga of Genesis. Rina faced Momoka Mandokoro at Rizin 30 on September 19, 2021, in what was the promotion's first ever women's kickboxing match. She won the bout by unanimous decision. In an auction Rizin Fighting Federation held later in the month, Rina's autographed gloves from the match sold for ¥400,000, the highest bid of the auction. Rina then had two exhibition bouts before the year was out, both of which were ruled no contest when their time limits elapsed. The first was two two-minute rounds against RISE's number two ranked mini flyweight Moe Okura at Bout 43 on November 21, 2021. The second was the second of three rounds in Hitomi "Sasori" Nagai's retirement match that took place at Nihon Kickboxing's Victory Series Vol. 7 on December 11, 2021.

On December 19, 2021, it was announced that Rina had vacated the Knock Out-Black Female Atomweight Championship and would move up a weight class to challenge Miki Kitamura for the inaugural Knock Out-Black Female Minimumweight Championship. Originally set for Knock Out 2022 Vol. 1 on January 22, 2022, the match had to be rescheduled after Rina contracted COVID-19. It took place on March 12, 2022, at Knock Out 2022 Vol. 2, with Rina winning her second professional championship by unanimous decision. In April 2022, Rina announced she had surgery to repair the anterior cruciate ligament in her left knee that was damaged during training, and would be out of competition for at least a year. On October 12, it was announced that Rina had left Struggle, the gym she had been with for five years. After discussing her life and future, she made the decision to become a freelance fighter on October 8.

=== 2022–present: Arrest and comeback ===
On December 5, 2022, Rina was arrested by Hyogo Prefectural Police on suspicion of fraud for selling a fake limited-edition poster signed by Tenshin Nasukawa and Takeru for ¥99,900 via an internet auction. Rina reportedly admitted to the accusations. On January 23, 2023, she uploaded a video to her YouTube account apologizing for her actions. In it, Rina explained that she had fallen victim to an internet scam and lost ¥15 million by June 2022. Unable to compete due to her injury, she sold the poster in order to recoup some of her losses. Rina was released from jail the day after her arrest, and claims to have met with the victim, who accepted her apology. The criminal case against Rina was dropped nolle prosequi on March 10, 2023.

On February 17, 2023, Rina and Knock Out held a press conference where it was announced that she had voluntarily vacated the Knock Out-Black Female Minimumweight Championship due to the incident. Rina made her return to the ring in a boxing-only exhibition bout scheduled for two two-minute rounds at Knock Out 2023 Super Bout "Blaze" on March 5. Her opponent was Ruka Sakamoto, who is known for competing in Breaking Down, a combat sports promotion where people, trained fighters or internet celebrities alike, fight in a single round lasting one minute. The bout was ruled a draw when the time limit elapsed. Rina made her kickboxing return against Wang Ching Long as the main event of Knock Out 2023 Vol. 1 on April 22. She won the match by majority decision. Her next bout was at Knock Out 2023 Vol. 4 on September 16, where she faced Chucky, a Taiwanese National Boxing gold medalist and former WOTD Women's Kickboxing 51 kg Champion. Rina won the fight by knockout at 2:58 of the second round when the referee stopped the match following a succession of knees. She followed this with another KO win at Knock Out 2023 Vol. 6 on December 9, when she stopped Australian Kaithly Vance, who is a former ISKA South Pacific Champion, ISKA Australian State Champion, and WMC Australian State Champion. The stoppage from a straight right at 1:14 of the third round earned Rina a ¥300,000 KO bonus.

Rina had her first fight of 2024 at K-1 World Max 2024 - World Tournament Opening Round, which was held at Yoyogi National Stadium's 1st Gymnasium on March 30. There, she defeated former RISE atomweight title challenger Koto Hiraoka by majority decision in what was her first match under K-1 rules, which do not allow clinching. As part of the Ganryujima Virtual Fight event organized by the mixed martial arts promotion Ganryujima, Rina's next competition was unusual in that it took place in a studio with no audience and was conducted on a mat instead of in a ring. The 49.5 kg kickboxing bout saw Rina at a size disadvantage against the undefeated Argentinian Lucia Apdelgarim. Filmed against a green screen sometime in April, it was then broadcast on May 3 with a digitally-added background. Rina lost the fight by majority decision, but both Gong Kakutogi and eFight noted that it was not an official kickboxing match and therefore would not be counted on her professional record. However, at the beginning of a May 16 press conference announcing her next match, Knock Out representative Genki Yamaguchi asked Rina if they could count the loss and she immediately replied in the affirmative. Rina also took to social media to request that the Apdelgallim bout be recorded as her first professional loss in kickboxing. Her next match was against ISKA Argentinian Strawweight Muay Thai Champion and WAKO Argentinian Champion Ayelen Gonzalez at Knock Out Carnival 2024 Super Bout "Blaze" at Yoyogi National Stadium's 2nd Gymnasium on June 23. Rina won by unanimous decision. Rina then faced K-1 fighter Mirei at Knock Out 2024 Vol. 5 on October 12. Due to Mirei missing weight by 2.35 kg; she was fined 30% of her fight purse, started the first round with a two-point deduction, had to wear 8 ounce gloves to Rina's 6 ounce gloves, and the bout would be declared a no contest if she won. Rina won the fight by majority decision.

Rina's next fight was against former WBO Miniflyweight Champion and former J-Girls Atomweight Champion Mako Yamada at Knock Out 2025 Vol. 1 on February 9, 2025. After three rounds, one of the judges gave the match to Rina, but the other two scored it a draw, taking the match into an extra fourth round. This final round, and as a result the match, was declared a split draw. Although the TV commentating team questioned how overtime could end in a draw, the rules were changed on December 9, 2024, to allow draws in the extended round. In an August 2025 interview, Rina said that she considered retiring after the Yamada fight due to her ongoing poor health since the end of 2024, but has decided to compete for one more year. She faced Thai mixed martial artist Amp The Rocket at Knock Out 56 ~New Beginning~ on August 29, 2025. After being deducted a point in the first round for accidentally hitting her opponent's face with her forearm in a vertical elbow-like motion, Rina won the bout by KO in the third round when Amp failed to get up after being knocked down from a knee to the face. Rina then faced decorated Thai fighter Sanengarm Sakchamni, the number 8 ranked minimumweight at Rajadamnern Stadium, at Knock Out 60 ~K.O Climax 2025~ on December 30. It was conducted with boxing gloves under Knock Out-Red rules, making it Rina's first match where elbows were allowed. Yamaguchi explained that Rina decided to make the change, because her performance had dipped ever since the Knock Out-Black rules were changed to limit clinching, and to chase the WBC Muay Thai championship before retiring. Rina lost the bout by unanimous decision.

Rina faced Siam Real Combat Women's Mini-Flyweight Champion Nong Gift at Rajadamnern World Series, which was held at Rajadamnern Stadium in Bangkok, Thailand on August 1, 2026. It was her first bout under authentic Muay Thai rules. She lost the fight by unanimous decision. Rina then defeated Hong Kong-based Muay Thai fighter Wong Hoka under Knock Out-Red rules at Knock Out 69 on October 23, 2026. Suffering an orbital fracture from a straight right thrown by Rina, Wong failed to stand up after being thrown to the ground and the referee declared Rina the winner by TKO at 2:37 of the second round.

== Other ventures ==
Rina made her gravure modeling debut in the July 2019 issue of Young Animal. She then posed for the January 27, 2020 issue of Weekly Playboy. That same month she became an "image character" for the real estate company Dear Life, whose parent company, DL Holdings, sponsors a Muay Thai event. Rina and Kai Asakura shared the cover of the November 2020 issue of Gong Kakutogi, which also featured an interview with the two. Rina walked the runway at Nara Collection 2021 in three different outfits. Her first photobook, Nijiiro Panchan (虹色ぱんちゃん), was released on June 10, 2022. Rina was a special guest judge for the Miss Oriental 2022 Nihon Taikai beauty pageant. Rina is noted for her use of social media. Her YouTube channel, which she started in May 2020, has over 145,000 subscribers.

== Championships and accomplishments ==
=== Kickboxing ===
Professional

- Knock Out
  - Knock Out-Black Female Minimumweight Champion (one-time, inaugural)
  - Knock Out-Black Female Atomweight Champion (one-time, inaugural)
  - Win bonus (two times)
  - KO bonus (one time)
- Rebels
  - Rebels-Black Women's 46 kg Champion (one-time, last)
  - Outstanding Performance Award (2021)
  - Win bonus (one time)

Amateur

- Kaminarimon
  - Kaminarimon All Japan 2018 47 kg Champion
- J-Network
  - 2018 Girls Bloom Cup -50 kg Champion

== Kickboxing record ==
Professional kickboxing record
21 wins (6 (T)KOs), 3 losses, 1 draw
Date	Result	Opponent	Event	Location	Method	Round	Time	Notes
2026-12-30		(Thailand) Lomfon Sor.Silalak	Knokck Out.17 ～K.O CLIMAX 2026～	Tokyo, Japan				Knock Out-Red rules
2026-10-23	Win	(Hong Kong) Wong Hoka	Knock Out 69	Tokyo, Japan	TKO (Straight right)	2	2:37	Knock Out-Red rules
2026-08-01	Loss	(Thailand) Nong Gift	Rajadamnern World Series	Bangkok, Thailand	Decision (Unanimous)	3	3:00	Muay Thai bout
2025-12-30	Loss	(Thailand) Sanengarm Sakchamni	Knock Out 60 ~K.O Climax 2025~	Tokyo, Japan	Decision (Unanimous)	3	3:00	Knock Out-Red rules
2025-08-29	Win	(Thailand) Amp the Rocket	Knock Out 56 ~New Beginning~	Tokyo, Japan	KO (Knee to the head)	3	0:47	
2025-02-09	Draw	(Japan) Mako Yamada	Knock Out 2025 Vol. 1	Tokyo, Japan	Ext. R Decision (Split)	4	3:00	
2024-10-12	Win	(Japan) Mirei	Knock Out 2024 Vol. 5	Tokyo, Japan	Decision (Majority)	3	3:00	Mirei missed weight.
2024-06-23	Win	(Argentina) Ayelen Gonzalez	Knock Out Carnival 2024 Super Bout "Blaze"	Tokyo, Japan	Decision (Unanimous)	3	3:00	
2024-05-03	Loss	(Argentina) Lucia Apdelgarim	Ganryujima Virtual Fight	Tokyo, Japan	Decision (Majority)	3	3:00	
2024-03-20	Win	(Japan) Koto Hiraoka	K-1 World Max 2024 - World Tournament Opening Round	Tokyo, Japan	Decision (Majority)	3	3:00	K-1 rules
2023-12-09	Win	(Australia) Kaithly Vance	Knock Out 2023 Vol. 6	Tokyo, Japan	KO (Straight right)	3	1:14	
2023-09-16	Win	(Taiwan) Chucky	Knock Out 2023 Vol. 4	Tokyo, Japan	KO (Knees)	2	2:58	
2023-04-22	Win	(Taiwan) Wang Chin Long	Knock Out 2023 Vol. 1	Tokyo, Japan	Decision (Majority)	3	3:00	
2022-03-12	Win	(Japan) Miki Kitamura	Knock Out 2022 Vol. 2	Tokyo, Japan	Decision (Unanimous)	3	3:00	
Won the inaugural Knock Out-Black Female Minimumweight Championship
2021-09-19	Win	(Japan) Momoka Mandokoro	Rizin 30	Saitama, Japan	Decision (Unanimous)	3	3:00	
2021-07-18	Win	(Japan) Sasori	Knock Out 2021 Vol. 3	Tokyo, Japan	Decision (Majority)	3	3:00	
2021-05-22	Win	(Peru) Mirey	Knock Out 2021 Vol. 2	Tokyo, Japan	KO (Straight right)	1	2:30	
2020-11-08	Win	(Japan) Mari	Rebels 67	Tokyo, Japan	Decision (Unanimous)	3	3:00	
2020-08-30	Win	(Japan) Misaki	Rebels 65	Tokyo, Japan	Decision (Unanimous)	3	3:00	
Won the inaugural Rebels-Black Women's 46 kg Championship.
2020-02-11	Win	(Japan) Shoko	Knock Out Championship 1	Tokyo, Japan	Decision (Unanimous)	3	3:00	
2019-12-08	Win	(Thailand) Petchompoo Mor Krungthepthonburi	Soul in the Ring Climax	Tokyo, Japan	TKO (Doctor stoppage)	1	2:20	
2019-10-04	Win	(Peru) Mirey	Knock Out × Rebels	Tokyo, Japan	Decision (Unanimous)	3	3:00	Rebels Muay Thai rules
2019-08-18	Win	(Japan) Shoko	K.O Climax 2019 Summer Kick Fever	Tokyo, Japan	Decision (Majority)	3	3:00	Rebels Muay Thai rules
2019-06-09	Win	(South Korea) Si Woo Park	Rebels 61	Tokyo, Japan	Decision (Unanimous)	3	2:00	
2019-04-20	Win	(Japan) Sae_KMG	Rebels 60	Tokyo, Japan	Decision (Unanimous)	3	2:00	Rebels Muay Thai rules
2019-02-17	Win	(Japan) Erisa Kawashima	Pancrase Rebels Ring 1 Night	Tokyo, Japan	Decision (Unanimous)	3	2:00	
Legend: Win Loss Draw/No contest Notes
