= Kensaku Maeda =

Japanese kickboxer

- Born: 前田憲作; May 9, 1968 (age 58); Zama, Kanagawa, Japan
- Nationality: (Japan) Japanese
- Height: 174 cm (5 ft 9 in)
- Weight: 60 kg (130 lb; 9.4 st)
- Style: Kickboxing
- Stance: Orthodox
- Fighting out of: Tokyo, Japan
- Team: Team Dragon (1999-); Singsak Victory Gym (S.V.G); Caesar Gym
- Trainer: Singsak Muangsurin

Kensaku Maeda is a Japanese former professional Kickboxer, former K-1 WORLD GP Japan producer. He is also renowned as the founder and head trainer of the successful kickboxing gym Team Dragon.

== Biography ==
=== Early years ===
In his youth Maeda was fan of Tiger Mask and Bruce Lee's movies which sparked his interest in martial arts, he later joined the Caesar Gym in Tokyo. The affiliation with Takeshi Caesar's gym led him to make his professional debut with the Shootboxing organization.

Maeda made his Muay Thai debut in 1989 at the Nakhon Pathom Stadium where he won by decision, following the experience he decided to switch from Shootboxing rules to Japanese Kickboxing in Japan and joined the All Japan Kickboxing Federation with the ambition to be ranked in the major Bangkok Stadiums.

=== Kickboxing career ===
in the late 1980s one of Maeda's main trainer, Singsak Muangsurin a former Rajadamnern Stadium Junior Welterweight Champion, decided to left Caesar Gym and create the Singsak Victory Gym (S.V.G).
Maeda followed Singsak but S.V.G didn't have a local and fighters had to train in dire conditions under a bridge in Setagaya.
Despite this situation Kensaku Maeda managed to won his first title on July 18, 1992, against his rival Atsushi Tateshima taking the AJKF Featherweight Championship belt by decision. Overcoming this situation and becoming champion attracted attention from the media and his popularity grew importantly.

Maeda lost his AJKF Featherweight title in a rematch with Atsushi Tateshima on November 27, 1993. He rebounded by winning his first world title the next year on July 30, 1994, against the American Lawrence Miera by TKO for the WKA Muay Thai World Super Featherweight title.
His fighting success added to his good looks made him a popular figure in media. In 1994 The character Shinsaku Maekawa in the video game Battle K-Road was directly inspired from Maeda. In 1996 he played the main role in the movie adaptation of the popular manga Rokudenashi Blues.

On July 25, 1997, he defended his WKA Muay Thai World title against the Australian Craig Pace by second-round KO. Four months later he made his K-1 debut for the Japan Featherweight Grand Prix at the K-1 Grand Prix '97 Final event, he lost to Takehiro Murahama by decision. Following this loss Maeda went away from the rings for almost two years. During his time off he took back his role from the Rokudenashi Blues movie in Rokudenashi Blues '98. He also appeared in the live-action adaptation of Abare Bunya.

In 1999 Kensaku Maeda founded Team Dragon with Taishin Kohiruimaki and Charn a Thai trainer. Maeda made his return to the ring on August 22 at K-1 Spirits '99 where he stopped Karim Nassar by second-round TKO.
On December 5, 1999, Maeda faced Australia's Brad Hemming at K-1 Grand Prix '99 final round. He won by first-round knockout. On March 19, 2000, Maeda face Muay Thai legend Chamuekpet Hapalang at the K-1 Burning 2000 event. He was defeated by unanimous decision after five rounds. On May 12, 2000, at K-1 King of the Ring 2000 Maeda won a double world title match beating Massimo Rizzoli by second-round TKO. He conserved the WKA Muay Thai World title and won the WAKO PRO Muay Thai World Super Featherweight title.

Maeda's retirement fight happened on October 11, 2002, at K-1 World MAX 2002 Champions' Challenge. He won a three rounds unanimous decision against Miroslav Safra.

=== After career ===
The day following his retirement fight Maeda officially opened his own Kickboxing gym called Team Dragon in Tokyo and would focus on being a Kickboxing instructor.

His work showed impressive results quickly some of his students (Taishin Kohiruimaki, Ryuji Kajiwara, Junichiro Sawayashiki, Keiji Ozaki) started to win titles in various organizations.

On January 28, 2008 K-1 hired Maeda to supervise the youth development of future K-1 fighters leading to the creation of K-1 Koshien, a tournament to determine the best under 18 amateur kickboxers of the country.

In 2010 Team Dragon and Maeda received the Best Dojo award for their success in the Shin Karate Grand Prix.
In the early 2010s Team Dragon emerged as one of the best kickboxing gym of Japan with fighters such as Hirotaka Urabe, Koya Urabe, Hideaki Yamazaki or Takeru.

On May 25, 2014, Maeda was introduced as producer of the newly created K-1 WORLD GP JAPAN, he had to leave the head of Team Dragon rebranded K-1 Gym Dragon to one of his trainers Masakazu Watanabe.

On September 9, 2016, for undisclosed reasons Maeda was forced to resign by the K-1 company and replaced by Mitsuru Miyata the former Krush producer.

Team Dragon Gym was freed from the K-1 affiliation but the fighters attached to it stayed with K-1 and as a result over 20 of his fighters, including his best champions, transferred to the newly created K-1 Gym KREST with Masakazu Watanabe as the head trainer.

== Titles and accomplishments ==
- All Japan Kickboxing Federation
  - 1992 AJKF Featherweight Champion
- World Kickboxing Association
  - 1994 WKA Muay Thai World Super Featherweight Champion (defended three times)
- World Association of Kickboxing Organizations
  - 2000 WAKO PRO Muay Thai World Super Featherweight Champion

== Notable Students ==
Name	Titles
(Japan) Taishin Kohiruimaki	ISKA World Oriental Super Welterweight Champion (2000); K-1 World MAX Japan tournament Champion (2004, 2005, 2009)
(Japan) Ryuji Kajiwara	J-NETWORK Lightweight Champion (2006); WFCA World Lightweight Champion (2007); Krush -63 kg Champion (2011)
(Japan) Kyotaro Fujimoto	K-1 Heavyweight Champion (2009)
(Japan) Hirotaka Urabe	Krush -60 kg Champion (2011); ISKA oriental rules World Super Lightweight Champion (2014); K-1 World GP -60 kg Champion (2015)
(Japan) Koya Urabe	K-1 WORLD MAX 2011 –63 kg Japan Tournament Runner-Up; ISKA K-1 rules World Lightweight Champion (2013); ISKA K-1 rules World Super Lightweight Champion (2014); K-1 World GP 2015 –60 kg Tournament Champion; K-1 World GP 2016 –60 kg World Tournament Champion
(Japan) Takeru	Krush -58 kg Tournament Champion (2013); K-1 World GP -55 kg World Tournament Champion (2015); K-1 World GP -57.5 kg World Tournament Champion (2016); K-1 World GP -60 kg World Tournament Champion (2018)
(Japan) Hideaki Yamazaki	Krush -63 kg Champion (2013); Krush -65 kg Champion (2015); K-1 World GP 2016 –65 kg Japan Tournament Champion
(Japan) Haruma Saikyo	Krush -58 kg Champion (2017); K-1 World GP -57.5 kg World Tournament Runner-Up (2018)

== Kickboxing record ==
Professional Kickboxing Record (Incomplete)
29 Wins (18 (T)KO's), 12 Losses, 1 Draws, 0 No contest
Date	Result	Opponent	Event	Location	Method	Round	Time
2002-10-11	Win	(Czech Republic) Miroslav Safra	K-1 World MAX 2002 Champions' Challenge	Tokyo, Japan	Decision (unanimous)	3	3:00
2000-07-26	Win	(Australia) Ben Smullen	WOLF REVOLUTION 〜First Wave〜	Tokyo, Japan	KO (left knee)	2	3:00
2000-05-12	Win	(Italy) Massimo Rizzoli	K-1 King of the Ring 2000	Bologna, Italy	TKO	2	2:35
Retains WKA Muay Thai World Super Featherweight title and wins WAKO PRO Muay Thai World Super Featherweight title.
2000-03-19	Loss	(Thailand) Chamuakpetch Haphalung	K-1 Burning 2000	Yokohama, Japan	Decision (unanimous)	5	3:00
1999-12-05	Win	(Australia) Brad Hemming	K-1 Grand Prix '99 final round	Tokyo, Japan	KO (left Kick)	1	1:33
1999-08-22	Win	(Australia) Karim Nassar	K-1 Spirits '99	Tokyo, Japan	TKO (corner stoppage)	2	0:27
1997-11-09	Loss	(Japan) Takehiro Murahama	K-1 Grand Prix '97 Final Japan Featherweight Tournament Semi-finals	Tokyo, Japan	Decision (unanimous)	3	3:00
1997-09-28	Win	(England) James Burgess	AJKF KICK OVER-IX	Tokyo, Japan	TKO (corner stoppage)	2	0:27
1997-07-25	Win	(Australia) Craig Pace	AJKF	Tokyo, Japan	KO	2	0:56
Retains WKA Muay Thai World Super Featherweight title.
1997-04-29	Win	(Switzerland) Souleymane Suleimani	AJKF	Tokyo, Japan	KO	2	
1997-01-31	Win	(Thailand) Arnee Sor.Suwanpakdee	AJKF	Tokyo, Japan	KO	2	
1996-03-24	Loss	(Japan) Riki Onodera	AJKF	Yokohama, Japan	Decision	5	3:00
1996-02-02	Loss	(Thailand) Tongsak Bor.Kor.Sor	Lumpinee Stadium	Bangkok, Thailand	Decision	5	3:00
1995-07-30	Win	(France) Khaled Ebieb	AJKF CHALLENGER-IX～ALL OR NOTHING	Tokyo, Japan			
Retains WKA Muay Thai World Super Featherweight title.
1995-01-07		(Netherlands) Marcel Karus	AJKF HOLDING OUT FOR A HERO	Tokyo, Japan			
1994-11-26	Win	(Netherlands) Maikel Lieuwfat	AJKF DESTINY X	Tokyo, Japan	KO (Spinning back fist)	5	1:52
Retains WKA Muay Thai World Super Featherweight title.
1994-07-30	Win	(United States) Lawrence Miera	AJKF DESTINY VII	Nagoya, Japan	TKO (corner stoppage)	2	3:00
Wins WKA Muay Thai World Super Featherweight title.
1994-05-20	Win	(Australia) John Ford	AJKF DESTINY V	Tokyo, Japan	KO (Knees to the Body)	2	1:32
1993-11-27	Loss	(Japan) Atsushi Tateshima	AJKF EVOLUTION step-8	Tokyo, Japan	KO (right Elbow)	3	0:49
Lost AJKF Featherweight title.
1993-09-25		(Japan) Hayashi (林成根)	AJKF Evolution STEP 6	Tokyo, Japan			
1993-05-22	Loss	(Thailand) Peemai Or.Yuttanakorn	AJKF	Tokyo, Japan	TKO (corner stoppage)	4	
1993-04-11		(Thailand) Fapikart Luktabfar	Channel 7 Stadium	Bangkok, Thailand			
1992-11-14	Win	(United States) Billy Bowen	AJKF in Las Vegas	Las Vegas, United States	KO (right middle kick)	4	1:21
1992-07-18	Win	(Japan) Atsushi Tateshima	AJKF EVOLUTION One Truth 5th	Tokyo, Japan	Decision (majority)	5	3:00
Wins AJKF Featherweight title.
1992-05-30	Win	(Japan) Takashi Nakajima	AJKF	Tokyo, Japan			
1992-01-		(Japan) Tadayuki Sugawara	AJKF	Tokyo, Japan			
1990-07-14			AJKF	Tokyo, Japan			
1989	Win	(Thailand)	Nakhon Pathom Stadium	Nakhon Pathom, Thailand	Decision	5	3:00
1989-02-17	Win	(Japan) Hidekazu Miyake	Shoot Boxing - Handicap Match 60 kg vs 65 kg	Tokyo, Japan	2nd Ext.R decision (unanimous)	5	3:00
1988-09-17	Win	(Japan) Shinji Koshino	Shoot Boxing	Tokyo, Japan	Ext.R decision (unanimous)	4	3:00
1988-04-03	Loss	(Japan) Li Sogi	Shoot Boxing World Revolution Sengen	Tokyo, Japan	KO	1	1:13
1988-01-31	Loss	(Japan) Hidekazu Miyake	Shoot Boxing '88 First Match	Tokyo, Japan	Decision	3	3:00
1987-10-10	Win	(Japan) Hidekazu Miyake	Shoot Boxing vs Okinawa Karate	Tokyo, Japan	KO	4 (Ext.R)	2:23
Legend: Win Loss Draw/No contest Notes

== Acting Work ==
- Rokudenashi Blues (1996)
- Jigoku-do Reikai Tsushin (1996)
- Rokudenashi Blues'98 (1998)
- Abare Bunya (1998)
- Shin Shonan Bosozoku Arakure Knight 4
