= Knock Out (kickboxing) =

Japanese martial arts promotion

- Type: Private
- Industry: Martial arts entertainment planning and promotion
- Founded: 2016
- Founders: Riki Onodera, Bushido Road
- Headquarters: Tokyo, Japan
- Key people: Mitsuru Miyata
- Owner: Def Fellow
- Website: Knockout Kickboxing

Knock Out (stylized as KNOCK OUT) is a Japanese martial arts promotion and brand established in 2016 by the Bushido Road subsidiary Kixroad. It is currently run by Def Fellow.

In 2019, the promotion established two different rulesets. The Knock Out-Red ruleset allowed elbow strikes, sweeps and throws. The Knock Out-Black ruleset followed the traditional K-1 ruleset, which allowed kicks and strikes with fists or knees, while extended clinching, elbow strikes and throws of any kind were prohibited.

== Current champions ==
Division	Red Champion	Black Champion
Super Middleweight (-75 kg)	Vacant	Vacant
Super Welterweight (-70 kg)	(Japan) Yoshiro Tsuzaki	(Japan) Ryoki
Welterweight (-67.5 kg)	Vacant	(Ukraine) Yulian Pozdniakov
Super Lightweight (-65 kg)	(Thailand) Dansiam Weerasakreck	(Japan) Chihiro Suzuki
Lightweight (-62.5 kg)	(Japan) Taimu Hisai	(Japan) Fumiya Osawa
Super Featherweight (-60 kg)	Vacant	(Japan) Ryusei
Featherweight (-57.5 kg)	Vacant	(Japan) Seiya Furuki
Super Bantamweight (-55 kg)	(Japan) Yuki Morioka	(Japan) Koki
Bantamweight (-53.5 kg)	(Japan) Riku Otsu	Vacant
Super Flyweight (-52 kg)	Vacant	Vacant
Minimumweight (-47.5 kg)	Vacant	Vacant
Atomweight (-46 kg)	Vacant	(Japan) Mako Yamada

== History ==
On September 14, 2016, Bushido Road announced the establishment of a new kickboxing promotion called Knock Out. The promotion was founded jointly by Riki Onodera and Road Fight, and initially partnered with another kickboxing promotion "NO KICK NO LIFE".

KNOCK OUT held their first event, called "Knock Out vol.0", at the Tokyo Dome City Hall on December 5, 2016. It was headlined by a muay thai bout between Sirimongkol PKsaenchaimuaythaigym and the Rajadamnern 135 lbs champion Genji Umeno. Tenshin Nasukawa faced the two-weight Lumpinee champion Wanchalong PK.Saenchai in the co-headliner. A half hour segment of the event was later broadcast by Tokyo MX on December 31, 2016. The event was fully broadcast on January 1, 2017.

Riki Onodera retired from the position of producer on April 29, 2019. On May 20, 2019, it was announced that he would be replaced by Genki Yamaguchi. On the same day, Knock Out announced that they had entered into a partnership agreement with Rebels, another kickboxing and muay thai promotion.

On June 15, 2020, Bushido Road sold Knock Out ownership rights to Def Fellow, the operating company of Rebels.

At a press conference held on September 28, 2020, producer Genki Yamaguchi announced his retirement. Former K-1 producer and Good Loser president Mitsuru Miyata was announced as his replacement.

On December 18, 2020, Def Fellow announced they would merge Rebels into the Knock Out brand. The merger occurred in March 2021.

== Rules ==
The current rules were last revised in February 2023, and are as follows:

- Matches are won by knockout, technical knockout, disqualification or judges decision.
  - A knockout victory is awarded if one competitor is rendered unable to continue competing as a result of a single strike.
  - A technical knockout victory is awarded is one of the following cases:
    - (1) if one of the competitors is unable to rise in time (i.e. within 10 seconds) following a knockdown
    - (2) if one of the competitors suffers three knockdowns inside of a single round
    - (3) if the corner-men of one of the competitors throws in the towel, or opts to retire their fighter at the end of the round
    - (4) if the referee decides that a competitor cannot continue fighting due to an injury, or if they receive significant damage without intelligently defending themselves
  - Matches are scored based on the following criteria:
    - (1) number of knockdowns
    - (2) presence or absence of damage done to the opponent
    - (3) number of clean hits
    - (4) aggressiveness
  - In case of a draw, an extension round will be fought, after which one competitor will necessarily be declared a winner
- Spitting, headbutts, biting, groin strikes, strikes to the back of the head, striking after the round has ended or the referee has called for a break, striking while the opponent is knocked down and excessive holding are all considered fouls. Furthermore, under the KNOCKOUT BLACK ruleset, sweeps, throws, and strikes with the elbow are prohibited. Fights under the BLACK rules allow a fighter to land a single strike while holding an opponent's leg, if it was caught after an attempted kick
  - If one of the competitors commits a foul, they will be given a caution and a warning. If the foul is repeated, they will be given a yellow card, which results in a point deduction. Should the foul be committed once again, the competitor will be given a red card, and will be disqualified.

== Championship history ==
=== King of Knock Out ===
==== Super Lightweight Championship ====
Weight limit: 65 kg

No.	Name	Date	Defenses
1	(Japan) Fukashi (def. Hideki)	August 19, 2018	

==== Lightweight Championship ====
Weight limit: 61.5 kg

No.	Name	Date	Defenses
1	(Japan) Yosuke Morii (def. Katsuji)	December 10, 2017	
2	(Thailand) Yodlekpet Or. Pitisak (def. Yosuke Morii)	August 14, 2018	def. Chan Hyung Lee on April 29, 2019

==== Super Bantamweight Championship ====
Weight limit: 55 kg

No.	Name	Date	Defenses
1	(Japan) Rui Ebata (def. Eisaku Ogasawara)	September 18, 2019	

==== Flyweight Championship ====
Weight limit: 51 kg

No.	Name	Date	Defenses
1	(Japan) Issei Ishii (def. Kazuki Osaki)	December 9, 2018	

=== Knock Out-Red ===
==== Red Super Welterweight Championship ====
Weight limit: 70 kg

No.	Name	Date	Defenses
1	(Japan) Eiji Yoshida (def. Yoshiro Tsuzaki)	October 16, 2019	
2	(Thailand) Kuntap Charoenchai (def. Yoshiro Tsuzaki)	December 11, 2022	def. Yoshiro Tsuzaki on December 1, 2024
3	(Japan) Yoshiro Tsuzaki (def. Kuntap Charoenchai)	May 18, 2025	

==== Red Super Lightweight Championship ====
Weight limit: 65 kg

No.	Name	Date	Defenses
1	(Japan) Bazooka Koki (def. Ryotaro)	September 16, 2023	
Bazooka Koki vacated the belt in 2024.
2	(Thailand) Dansiam Weerasakreck (def. Ryotaro)	December 1, 2024	def. Taimu Hisai on June 21, 2026

==== Red Lightweight Championship ====
Weight limit: 62.5 kg

No.	Name	Date	Defenses
1	(Thailand) Suarek Rukkukamui (def. Yota Shigemori)	September 22, 2020	
2	(Japan) Yota Shigemori (def. Suarek Rukkukamui)	July 18, 2021	
3	(Thailand) Kongnapa Weerasakreck (def. Yota Shigemori)	June 22, 2025	
4	(Japan) Taimu Hisai (def. Kongnapa Weerasakreck)	December 30, 2025	draws vs. Kongnapa Weerasakreck on February 15, 2026
Hisai vacated the title in 2026 in order to move up in weight

==== Red Super Featherweight Championship ====
Weight limit: 60 kg

No.	Name	Date	Defenses
1	(Japan) Taimu Hisai (def. Soichiro Arata)	December 11, 2022	
Hisai vacated the title in 2023 in order to move up in weight
2	(Japan) Taimu Hisai (def. Kanata Shimoji)	December 30, 2024	
Hisai vacated the title on July 9, 2025 in order to move up in weight
3	(Japan) Ryusei (def. Kaewkangwan Torfunfarm)	September 5, 2026	

==== Red Featherweight Championship ====
Weight limit: 57.5 kg

No.	Name	Date	Defenses
1	(Japan) Haruto Yasumoto (def. Shogo Kuriaki)	June 9, 2019	
Yasumoto vacated the title on July 28, 2022, after signing with RISE.
2	(Japan) Eisaku Ogasawara (def. Takeru Owaki)	September 23, 2022	
Ogasawara vacated the title in 2025.
3	(Thailand) Surasak KrudamGym (def. Kyoken Jin)	August 8, 2026	

==== Red Super Bantamweight Championship ====
Weight limit: 55 kg

No.	Name	Date	Defenses
1	(Japan) Eisaku Ogasawara (def. King Kyosuke)	March 13, 2021	def. Issei Saenchaigym on November 28, 2021
Ogasawara vacated the title on August 18, 2022, in order to move up to featherweight.
2	(Japan) Issei SaenchaiGym (def. Yuki Morioka)	November 19, 2022	
3	(Japan) Hikaru Furumura (def. Issei SaenchaiGym)	August 6, 2023	
4	(Japan) Issei SaenchaiGym (2) (def. Hikaru Furumura)	April 27, 2024	
5	(Japan) Yuki Morioka (def. Issei SaenchaiGym)	June 22, 2025	

==== Red Bantamweight Championship ====
Weight limit: 53.5 kg

No.	Name	Date	Defenses
1	(Japan) Kyoha (def. Kohei Adachi)	September 25, 2021	
Kyoha vacated the title in 2022.
2	(Japan) Riku Otsu (def. Shinta)	August 6, 2023	

==== Red Super Flyweight Championship ====
Weight limit: 52 kg

No.	Name	Date	Defenses
1	(Japan) Yusei Shirahata (def. Ryuto Oinuma)	February 28, 2021	
Shirahata vacated the title on March 3, 2022.
2	(Japan) Shinta (def. Riku Otsu)	December 11, 2022	
Shinta vacated the title on 2023, in order to move up to bantamweight.

==== Red Light Flyweight Championship ====
Weight limit:49 kg

No.	Name	Date	Defenses
1	(Japan) Arina Kobayashi (def. Sanengarm Sakchamni)	August 8, 2026	

=== Knock Out-Black ===
==== Black Super Middleweight Championship ====
Weight limit: 75 kg

No.	Name	Date	Defenses
1	(Japan) Shintaro Matsukura (def. Hijiri Tamura)	July 18, 2021	
Matsukura vacated the title on March 3, 2022.

==== Black Super Welterweight Championship ====
Weight limit: 70 kg

No.	Name	Date	Defenses
1	(Japan) Kaito Ono (def. Hinata)	February 28, 2021	def. Sitthichai Sitsongpeenong on December 30, 2025
Kaito vacated the title on February 24, 2026. Interim champion Ryoki was elevated to regular champion
2	(Japan) Ryoki (def. Hiroki Nakajima for the interim title)	May 18, 2025	draws with Sitthichai Sitsongpeenong on April 18, 2026

==== Black Welterweight Championship ====
Weight limit: 67.5 kg

No.	Name	Date	Defenses
1	(Japan) Ryotaro (def. Daiki Watabe)	September 23, 2022	
2	(Japan) Rei Nakajima (def. Daiki Watabe)	December 30, 2024	
3	(Ukraine) Yulian Pozdniakov (def. Rei Nakajima)	December 30, 2025	

==== Black Super Lightweight Championship ====
Weight limit: 65 kg

No.	Name	Date	Defenses
1	(Japan) Chihiro Suzuki (def. Keijirō Miyakoshi)	July 18, 2021	

==== Black Lightweight Championship ====
Weight limit: 62.5 kg

No.	Name	Date	Defenses
1	(Japan) Bazooka Koki (def. Keisuke Niwa)	August 30, 2020	def. Shoji Otani on May 22, 2021
Bazooka Koki vacated the title in 2023 in order to move up in weight
2	(Japan) Taimu Hisai (def. Shoji Otani)	September 16, 2023	
Hisai vacated the title in 2024 in order to focus on his Super featherweight title
3	(Japan) Shoji Otani (def. Saengdawlek Y’ZD Gym)	December 1, 2024	
4	(Japan) Fumiya Osawa (def. Shoji Otani)	May 18, 2025	

==== Black Super Featherweight Championship ====
Weight limit: 60 kg

No.	Name	Date	Defenses
1	(Japan) Taimu Hisai (def. Ryusei)	June 23, 2024	def. Ryusei on June 22, 2025
Hisai vacated the title on July 9, 2025, in order to move up in weight
2	(Japan) Ryusei (def. Reiya Komori)	June 21, 2026	

==== Black Featherweight Championship ====
Weight limit: 57.5 kg

No.	Name	Date	Defenses
1	(Japan) Ryusei (def. Ginji)	October 29, 2021	
Ryusei vacated the title on July 11, 2024 in order to move up in weight
2	(Japan) Shogo Kuriaki (def. Qumuxifu)	October 12, 2024	
Kuriaki vacated the title in 2025 in order to transition to mixed martial arts
3	(Japan) Seiya Furuki (def. Ryota Naito)	September 23, 2025	
4	(China) Qumuxifu (def. Seiya Furuki)	February 15, 2026	

==== Black Super Bantamweight Championship ====
Weight limit: 55 kg

No.	Name	Date	Defenses
1	(Japan) Seiya Furuki (def. Reo "red" Kudo)	December 11, 2022	def. Takaya Ogura on August 6, 2023
Furuki vacated the title in 2025 in order to move up in weight
2	(Japan) Yuki Morioka (def. Takumi Fukuda)	September 23, 2025	
3	(Japan) Koki (def. Yuki Morioka)	June 21, 2026	

==== Black Super Flyweight Championship ====
Weight limit: 52 kg

No.	Name	Date	Defenses
1	(Japan) Ryu Hanaoka (def. Takumi Hamada)	September 25, 2021	
Hanaoka vacated the title on July 28, 2022, after signing with RISE.

==== Black Female Minimumweight Championship ====
Weight limit: 47.5 kg

No.	Name	Date	Defenses
1	(Japan) Panchan Rina (def. Miki Kitamura)	March 12, 2022	
Rina vacated the title on February 17, 2023, after being arrested on fraud charges

==== Black Female Atomweight Championship ====
Weight limit: 46 kg

No.	Name	Date	Defenses
1	(Japan) Panchan Rina (def. Misaki)	August 30, 2020	
Rina vacated the title on December 19, 2021, in order to move up in weight.
2	(Japan) Kiho (def. Mako Yamada)	September 23, 2025	
3	(Japan) Mako Yamada (def. Kiho)	December 30, 2025	
4	(Japan) Koto Hiraoka (def. Mako Yamada)	September 5, 2026	

=== Grand Prix ===
Knock Out Black -64kg Grand Prix
Date	Champion	Nationality	Event	Location	Runner-up	Nationality
2020-02-11	Renta Nishioka	Japan	Knock Out Championship.1	Tokyo, Japan	Koki Bazooka	Japan
