= Nadeshiko (kickboxer) =

Japanese kickboxer (born 2000)

- Born: 7 July 2000 (age 26); Sapporo, Japan
- Height: 1.52 m (5 ft 0 in)
- Weight: 46 kg (101 lb; 7 st 3 lb)
- Division: Pinweight; Minimumweight
- Style: Kickboxing; Muay thai
- Team: Grabs Kickboxing Studio
- Years active: 2021 - 2025

Kickboxing record
- Total: 20
- Wins: 12
- By knockout: 2
- Losses: 7
- By knockout: 1
- Draws: 1

Nadeshiko (撫子) (born 7 July 2000) is a retired Japanese kickboxer and Nak Muay. She is a former WBC Minimumweight Muay Thai World Champion.

== Professional career ==
Nadeshiko defeated Saya Tsukamoto by unanimous decision at RISE EVOL.9 on 28 August 2021.

Nadeshiko defeated Chigusa Saito by unanimous decision at DUEL.22 on 31 October 2021.

Nadeshiko faced Noah Fujiwara at Challenger 4 on 9 January 2022. The fight ended in a draw by majority decision.

Nadeshiko had a rematch with Noah Fujiwara at Kick Insist 12 on 20 March 2022. She lost the fight by unanimous decision.

Nadeshiko faced again Chigusa Saito at DUEL 24 on 3 July 2022. She won the fight by unanimous decision.

Nadeshiko defeated Minori Kikuchi by unanimous decision at Shoot Boxing Young Caeser Cup Central 30: DEAD or ALIVE 04 on 24 July 2022.

Nadeshiko knocked out Nekota in the first round at DUEL.25 on 16 October 2022.

Nadeshiko defeated Jolyne Matsumoto by split decision at Kross×Over 20 on 17 December 2022.

Nadeshiko challenged Noah Fujiwara for the NJKF Minerva Pinweight title at KICK Insist 15 on 19 March 2023. She won the fight by unanimous decision.

Nadeshiko lost to Kana Oshikawa by unanimous decision at BOM 40 on 14 May 2023.

Nadeshiko made her first NJKF Minerva Pinweight title defense against Chigusa Saito at BOUT 48 on 5 November 2023. She won the fight by unanimous decision.

Nadeshiko challenged Ai "Bōkun" Tanaka for the Sanctuary Pinweight title at Hardcore Sanctuary 2024 -1st- on 21 April 2024. She lost the fight by a fifth-round technical knockout.

Nadeshiko defeated Uver∞miyU by unanimous decision at Burst on 20 July 2024.

Nadeshiko challenged Mirey for the WMC Japan Pinweight title at BOM 47 on 1 September 2024. She lost the fight by split decision.

Nadeshiko lost to Misaki Morita by unanimous decision at Shoot Boxing Battle Summit on 26 December 2024.

Nadeshiko challenged Mari Kamikariya for t=he NJKF Minerva Paperweight title at Magnum 61 on 2 March 2025. She won the fight by unanimous decision.

Nadeshiko lost to Jolyne Matsumoto by majority decision at Kross×Over Cage 6 on 15 June 2025.

Nadeshiko challenged Lucille Deadman for the WBC Minimumweight Muay Thai World title at Muay Thai League 15 on 9 August 2025. She won the fight by a fourth-round technical knockout.

Nadeshiko announced her retirement from the sport on 1 December 2025.

== Championships and accomplishments ==
- 2023 NJKF Minerva Pinweight Champion
- 2025 NJKF Minerva Paperweight Champion
- 2025 WBC Muay Thai World Minimumweight Champion

== See also ==
- List of female kickboxers
- List of WBC Muaythai female world champions
