= List of current kickboxing world champions =

This is a list of current world kickboxing champions.

== Men ==
=== Unlimited ===
Name		Organization	Date	No. of title defenses	Source(s)
(Guinea); Guinean	Mory Kromah	(Netherlands) Glory (Netherlands)	Feb 7, 2026	1	
(Ukraine); Ukrainian	Roman Kryklia	(Singapore) ONE Championship (Singapore)	Jun 19, 2026	0	
(Brazil); Brazilian	Ariel Machado	(Japan) K-1 (Japan)	Nov 15, 2025	1	
(Cuba); Cuban	Robelis Despaigne	(United States) Karate Combat (United States)	Dec 5, 2025	0	
N/A	Vacant	(Netherlands) Enfusion (Netherlands)	N/A	N/A	
(Romania); Romanian	Alin Nechita	(Romania) Colosseum Tournament (Romania)	Dec 8, 2023	0	
(Poland); Polish	Michał Turyński	(Lithuania) KOK (Lithuania)	May 22, 2021	0	
(Suriname); Surinamese	Jahfarr Wilnis	(Netherlands) World Fighting League (Netherlands)	Jun 27, 2026	1	
(Croatia); Croatian	Ivan Bertić	(Croatia) Arena Golden Fight (Croatia)	Apr 18, 2026	0	
(Cape Verde); Cape Verdean	Nico Pereira Horta	(Netherlands) Heresh (Netherlands)	Jun 20, 2026	0	

=== 102 kg / 225 lb ===
Name		Organization	Date	No. of title defenses	Source(s)
(Ukraine); Ukrainian	Roman Kryklia	(Singapore) ONE Championship (Singapore)	Nov 16, 2019	2	
(Russia); Russian	Maxim Baklanov (101.2 kg)	(Russia) RCC Fair Fight (Russia)	Apr 25, 2026	0	

=== 95 kg / 209 lb ===
Name		Organization	Date	No. of title defenses	Source(s)
(Morocco); Morroccan	Mohamed Touchassie	(Netherlands) Glory (Netherlands)	Jun 13, 2026	0	
(United States); American	Sam Alvey (205 lbs)	(United States) Karate Combat (United States)	Jul 24, 2026	0	
(Netherlands); Dutch	Thian de Vries (93 kg)	(Netherlands) Enfusion (Netherlands)	May 18, 2024	0	
(Netherlands); Dutch	Thian de Vries	(Romania) Colosseum Tournament (Romania)	Jun 30, 2023	0	
N/A	Vacant	(Lithuania) KOK (Lithuania)	N/A	N/A	
(Moldova); Moldovan	Alexandru Burduja	(Moldova) FEA Championship (Moldova)	Mar 18, 2025	0	
(Brazil); Brazilian	Ariel Machado (94.1 kg)	(Brazil) WGP Kickboxing (Brazil)	Jun 17, 2023	0	
(Italy); Italian	Enrico Pellegrino (94.1 kg)	(Italy) Fight Clubbing (Italy)	May 20, 2023	0	
(Turkey); Turkish	Yasin Güren	(Netherlands) World Fighting League (Netherlands)	Nov 1, 2026	0	

=== 90 kg / 198 lb ===
Name		Organization	Date	No. of title defenses	Source(s)
(Netherlands); Dutch	Thian de Vries	(Japan) K-1 (Japan)	May 31, 2025	0	
(Netherlands); Dutch	Thian de Vries (88 kg)	(Netherlands) Enfusion (Netherlands)	Nov 25, 2023	4	
N/A	Vacant	(Japan) Krush (Japan)	N/A	N/A	
(Croatia); Croatian	Ivan Bertić (91 kg)	(Croatia) Arena Golden Fight (Croatia)	Apr 4, 2025	1	

=== 85 kg / 187 lb ===
Name		Organization	Date	No. of title defenses	Source(s)
(Suriname); Surinamese	Chico Kwasi	(Netherlands) Glory (Netherlands)	Apr 25, 2026	0	
(Russia); Russian	Ilyas Khamzin (185 lbs)	(United States) Karate Combat (United States)	Oct 31, 2025	2	
(Morocco); Morroccan	Anwar Dira (84 kg)	(Netherlands) Enfusion (Netherlands)	Jun 6, 2026	0	
(Lithuania); Lithuanian	Dominykas Dirkstys (86 kg)	(Lithuania) UTMA (Lithuania)	Nov 28, 2025	0	
N/A	Vacant	(Lithuania) KOK (Lithuania)	N/A	N/A	
(Moldova); Moldovan	Artiom Livadari	(Moldova) FEA Championship (Moldova)	Nov 29, 2025	0	
(Brazil); Brazilian	Matheus Nogueira (85.1 kg)	(Brazil) WGP Kickboxing (Brazil)	Jun 15, 2024	1	
(Italy); Italian	Massimo Rigamonti (85.1 kg)	(Italy) Fight Clubbing (Italy)	Nov 21, 2026	0	
(Morocco); Morroccan	Aimane Latifi (84 kg)	(Netherlands) World Fighting League (Netherlands)	Apr 19, 2025	1	
(Croatia); Croatian	Vito Košar	(Croatia) Arena Golden Fight (Croatia)	Jun 27, 2026	0	
(Morocco); Morroccan	Ilyass Chakir (83.9 kg)	(Bulgaria) Elite Fighting Arena (Bulgaria)	Oct 3, 2026	0	

=== 82.5 kg / 182 lb ===
Name		Organization	Date	No. of title defenses	Source(s)
(Germany); German	Sergej Braun	(Netherlands) World Fighting League (Netherlands)	Oct 24, 2026	0	

=== 80 kg / 176 lb ===
Name		Organization	Date	No. of title defenses	Source(s)
(Netherlands); Dutch	Nick Regter	(Netherlands) Enfusion (Netherlands)	Nov 1, 2025	0	
N/A	Vacant	(Lithuania) UTMA (Lithuania)	N/A	N/A	
(Cameroon); Cameroonian	Brice Kombou	(Germany) IFP - International Fight Promotion (Germany)	May 23, 2026	0	
(Croatia); Croatian	Vito Stojcić (81 kg)	(Croatia) Arena Golden Fight (Croatia)	Aug 3, 2024	1	
N/A	Vacant	(Estonia) The League (Estonia)	N/A	N/A	

=== 77 kg / 170 lb ===
Name		Organization	Date	No. of title defenses	Source(s)
(Suriname); Surinamese	Chico Kwasi	(Netherlands) Glory (Netherlands)	Apr 27, 2024	5	
(Suriname); Surinamese	Regian Eersel	(Singapore) ONE Championship (Singapore)	Apr 10, 2026	0	
(Morocco); Morroccan	Oussama Assli	(United States) Karate Combat (United States)	Dec 5, 2025	1	
(Morocco); Morroccan	Youssef Khalouta	(Netherlands) Enfusion (Netherlands)	Dec 20, 2025	0	
(Russia); Russian	Dmitry Menshikov	(China) Wu Lin Feng (China)	May 16, 2026	0	
(Romania); Romanian	Alex Panțîru	(Romania) Colosseum Tournament (Romania)	Dec 12, 2025	0	
(Romania); Romanian	Florin Lambagiu	(Romania) Dynamite Fighting Show (Romania)	Dec 15, 2023	0	
(Latvia); Latvian	Zaurs Džavadovs	(Lithuania) KOK (Lithuania)	Feb 9, 2025	0	
(Moldova); Moldovan	Artiom Livadari	(Moldova) FEA Championship (Moldova)	Mar 30, 2024	0	
(Brazil); Brazilian	Lucas Rafael (78.1 kg)	(Brazil) WGP Kickboxing (Brazil)	Jun 21, 2026	0	
(Russia); Russian	Eduard Saik (77.1 kg)	(Russia) RCC Fair Fight (Russia)	Aug 17, 2025	1	
(Morocco); Morroccan	Younes Smaili	(Germany) IFP - International Fight Promotion (Germany)	Dec 14, 2025	0	
(Iran); Iranian	Karoo Gijahi	(Netherlands) World Fighting League (Netherlands)	Sep 20, 2026	0	
(Bulgaria); Bulgarian	Martin Koprivlenski (77.1 kg)	(Bulgaria) Elite Fighting Arena (Bulgaria)	Mar 21, 2026	0	

=== 75 kg / 165 lb ===
Name		Organization	Date	No. of title defenses	Source(s)
(Brazil); Brazilian	Dengue Silva	(Japan) K-1 (Japan)	Apr 11, 2026	0	
N/A	Vacant	(Japan) Krush (Japan)	N/A	N/A	
(Serbia); Serbian	Nikola Cvetkovič	(Lithuania) UTMA (Lithuania)	Sep 27, 2025	1	
(Italy); Italian	Alessio Zeloni	(Italy) Fight Clubbing (Italy)	Dec 20, 2025	2	
(Turkey); Turkish	Alparslan Balak	(Turkey) TCA Fight Night (Turkey)	Aug 30, 2026	0	

=== 72.5 kg / 160 lb ===
Name		Organization	Date	No. of title defenses	Source(s)
(Belgium); Belgian	Jannes Vercaemst (73.5 kg)	(Netherlands) Enfusion (Netherlands)	Jun 6, 2026	0	
(Brazil); Brazilian	Petros Freitas (71.8 kg)	(Brazil) WGP Kickboxing (Brazil)	Mar 23, 2024	1	
(Italy); Italian	Angelo Volpe (71.8 kg)	(Italy) Fight Clubbing (Italy)	May 24, 2025	1	
(Germany); German	Enriko Kehl	(Germany) IFP - International Fight Promotion (Germany)	May 23, 2026	0	

=== 70 kg / 154 lb ===
Name		Organization	Date	No. of title defenses	Source(s)
(Thailand); Thai	Superbon Singha Mawynn	(Singapore) ONE Championship (Singapore)	Jan 6, 2025	1	
(Brazil); Brazilian	Jonas Salsicha	(Japan) K-1 (Japan)	Apr 11, 2026	0	
(Pakistan); Pakistani	Shahzaib Rindh (155 lbs)	(United States) Karate Combat (United States)	Jul 19, 2025	0	
(Morocco); Morroccan	Anouar Afakir	(Netherlands) Enfusion (Netherlands)	May 2, 2026	0	
N/A	Vacant	(Japan) Krush (Japan)	N/A	N/A	
(Japan); Japanese	Ryoki	(Japan) Knock Out (Japan)	May 18, 2025	0	
(China); Chinese	Ouyang Feng	(China) Wu Lin Feng (China)	Jul 29, 2023	1	
(Romania); Romanian	Marian Lăpușneanu	(Romania) Colosseum Tournament (Romania)	May 5, 2023	0	
(Romania); Romanian	Valentin Mavrodin	(Romania) Dynamite Fighting Show (Romania)	Mar 29, 2024	1	
(Finland); Finnish	Niko Korventaus (71 kg)	(Lithuania) KOK (Lithuania)	Mar 18, 2023	0	
(Moldova); Moldovan	Victor Apostol (71 kg)	(Moldova) FEA Championship (Moldova)	Mar 18, 2025	0	
(Colombia); Colombian	Anderson Cano Perez (69.1 kg)	(Italy) Fight Clubbing (Italy)	May 4, 2024	1	
(Morocco); Morroccan	Mohammed Boutasaa	(Germany) IFP - International Fight Promotion (Germany)	May 23, 2026	0	
(Netherlands); Dutch	Mitchell Lammers	(Netherlands) World Fighting League (Netherlands)	Jun 23, 2024	1	
(Croatia); Croatian	Borna Bilandžić (71 kg)	(Croatia) Arena Golden Fight (Croatia)	Dec 14, 2025	0	
(Slovenia); Slovene	Samo Petje	(Italy) PetrosyanMania (Italy)	Nov 7, 2026	0	
(United States); American	Aaron Perkins	(United States) Freedom Fighter Promotions (United States)	Jul 25, 2026	0	

=== 67.5 kg / 149 lb ===
Name		Organization	Date	No. of title defenses	Source(s)
N/A	Vacant	(Japan) K-1 (Japan)	N/A	N/A	
(Morocco); Morroccan	Anouar Afakir	(Netherlands) Enfusion (Netherlands)	Sep 27, 2025	0	
(Japan); Japanese	Koya Saito	(Japan) Krush (Japan)	Dec 19, 2025	0	
(Ukraine); Ukrainian	Yulian Pozdniakov	(Japan) Knock Out (Japan)	Dec 30, 2025	0	
(China); Chinese	Er Kang (67 kg)	(China) Wu Lin Feng (China)	Feb 7, 2026	1	
(Pakistan); Pakistani	Khyzer Hayat (67 kg)	(Lithuania) UTMA (Lithuania)	Sep 26, 2026	0	
N/A	Inaugural (66.8 kg)	(Italy) Fight Clubbing (Italy)	N/A	N/A	
(Albania); Albanian	Muhamet Deskaj	(Croatia) Arena Golden Fight (Croatia)	Aug 3, 2024	0	
(Romania); Romanian	Ștefan Vrânceanu (67 kg)	(Romania) E.F.C. - Elite Fighting Championship (Romania)	Oct 2, 2026	0	

=== 65 kg / 143 lb ===
Name		Organization	Date	No. of title defenses	Source(s)
(Portugal); Portuguese	Miguel Trindade	(Netherlands) Glory (Netherlands)	Oct 17, 2026	0	
(England); English	Jonathan Haggerty	(Singapore) ONE Championship (Singapore)	Nov 4, 2023	3	
(Japan); Japanese	Taio Asahisa	(Japan) K-1 (Japan)	Nov 15, 2025	1	
N/A	Vacant	(Japan) RISE (Japan)	N/A	N/A	
(United States); American	Andre Ewell (145 lbs)	(United States) Karate Combat (United States)	Oct 17, 2026	0	
N/A	Vacant	(Netherlands) Enfusion (Netherlands)	N/A	N/A	
(Japan); Japanese	Shu Inagaki	(Japan) Krush (Japan)	Apr 28, 2023	2	
(Japan); Japanese	Chihiro Suzuki	(Japan) Knock Out (Japan)	Jul 18, 2021	0	
(China); Chinese	Meng Gaofeng	(China) Wu Lin Feng (China)	Jan 1, 2022	1	
(Romania); Romanian	Adrian Maxim	(Romania) Colosseum Tournament (Romania)	Jun 26, 2026	0	
N/A	Vacant	(Lithuania) KOK (Lithuania)	N/A	N/A	
(Moldova); Moldovan	Dmitrii Sîrbu	(Moldova) FEA Championship (Moldova)	Apr 8, 2023	1	
(Brazil); Brazilian	Vinicius Mestrinier (64.5 kg)	(Brazil) WGP Kickboxing (Brazil)	Aug 30, 2026	0	
(Turkey); Turkish	Şuayb Acar (64.5 kg)	(Italy) Fight Clubbing (Italy)	Sep 19, 2026	0	
(Portugal); Portuguese	Tiago Santos	(Germany) IFP - International Fight Promotion (Germany)	Sep 27, 2025	0	
(Portugal); Portuguese	Tiago Santos	(Netherlands) World Fighting League (Netherlands)	Jun 27, 2026	1	
(Croatia); Croatian	Roko Doždor	(Croatia) Arena Golden Fight (Croatia)	Oct 2, 2026	0	
(Romania); Romanian	Ștefan Vrânceanu	(Italy) PetrosyanMania (Italy)	Nov 7, 2026	0	
(Morocco); Morroccan	Mohamed Hamami	(Netherlands) Heresh (Netherlands)	Feb 14, 2026	0	

=== 62.5 kg, 138 lb ===
Name		Organization	Date	No. of title defenses	Source(s)
(Japan); Japanese	Kiyomitsu Samuel Nagasawa	(Japan) K-1 (Japan)	Sep 12, 2026	0	
(Morocco); Morroccan	Ahmed Akoudad (63 kg)	(Netherlands) Enfusion (Netherlands)	Nov 1, 2025	0	
(Japan); Japanese	Kenshin Kodama	(Japan) Krush (Japan)	Oct 31, 2026	0	
(Japan); Japanese	Fumiya Osawa	(Japan) Knock Out (Japan)	May 18, 2025	0	
(Georgia (country)); Georgian	Giorgi Malania (63 kg)	(China) Wu Lin Feng (China)	Jan 25, 2025	2	
(Lithuania); Lithuanian	Modestas Žmuidina (63.5 kg)	(Lithuania) UTMA (Lithuania)	Sep 26, 2026	0	
(China); Chinese	Liu Junchao (63.5 kg)	(Germany) IFP - International Fight Promotion (Germany)	Mar 28, 2026	0	
(Thailand); Thai	Chatmongkon Rarangsit (63 kg)	(Netherlands) World Fighting League (Netherlands)	Nov 1, 2026	0	

=== 60 kg / 132 lb ===
Name		Organization	Date	No. of title defenses	Source(s)
N/A	Vacant (135 lb)	(Singapore) ONE Championship (Singapore)	N/A	N/A	
(Japan); Japanese	Tomoya Yokoyama	(Japan) K-1 (Japan)	May 31, 2026	1	
(Chile); Chilean	Arturo Vergara (135 lb)	(United States) Karate Combat (United States)	Dec 19, 2024	0	
(Turkey); Turkish	Muhammed Şimşek (61 kg)	(Netherlands) Enfusion (Netherlands)	Nov 16, 2025	1	
(Japan); Japanese	Kanata Ueno	(Japan) Krush (Japan)	Aug 30, 2026	0	
(Japan); Japanese	Ryusei Kumagai	(Japan) Knock Out (Japan)	Jun 21, 2026	0	
(Japan); Japanese	Hirotaka Asahisa	(China) Wu Lin Feng (China)	Mar 10, 2018	2	
(Romania); Romanian	Daniel Dragomir (61 kg)	(Romania) Colosseum Tournament (Romania)	Oct 20, 2023	2	
(Brazil); Brazilian	Cabelo Monteiro	(Brazil) WGP Kickboxing (Brazil)	May 19, 2024	3	
(Morocco); Morroccan	Amin Bakkali (61 kg)	(Germany) IFP - International Fight Promotion (Germany)	May 23, 2026	0	
(Netherlands); Dutch	Jayjay Morris (61 kg)	(Netherlands) World Fighting League (Netherlands)	Apr 19, 2025	0	
(Suriname); Surinamese	Diego Jagessar (61 kg)	(United States) Freedom Fighter Promotions (United States)	Dec 6, 2025	0	

=== 57.5 kg / 127 lb ===
Name		Organization	Date	No. of title defenses	Source(s)
(Canada); Canadian	Jonathan Di Bella (125 lb)	(Singapore) ONE Championship (Singapore)	Oct 3, 2025	1	
(Japan); Japanese	Rui Okubo	(Japan) K-1 (Japan)	Sep 12, 2026	0	
N/A	Vacant	(Japan) RISE (Japan)	N/A	N/A	
N/A	Vacant	(Japan) Krush (Japan)	N/A	N/A	
(China); Chinese	Qumuxifu	(Japan) Knock Out (Japan)	Feb 15, 2026	0	
(Romania); Romanian	Cosmin Brumă (58.2 kg)	(Italy) Fight Clubbing (Italy)	Nov 22, 2025	1	

=== 55 kg / 121 lb ===
Name		Organization	Date	No. of title defenses	Source(s)
(Japan); Japanese	Riamu Sera	(Japan) K-1 (Japan)	Sep 12, 2026	0	
(Japan); Japanese	Koki Osaki	(Japan) RISE (Japan)	Mar 28, 2026	0	
(Japan); Japanese	Riamu Sera	(Japan) Krush (Japan)	Oct 31, 2021	4	
(Japan); Japanese	Koki Tomimura	(Japan) Knock Out (Japan)	Jun 21, 2026	0	
N/A	Inaugural (54.5 kg)	(Italy) Fight Clubbing (Italy)	N/A	N/A	

=== 53 kg / 117 lb ===
Name		Organization	Date	No. of title defenses	Source(s)
(Japan); Japanese	Neigo Katono	(Japan) K-1 (Japan)	Jul 20, 2026	0	
(Japan); Japanese	Ryujin Nasukawa	(Japan) RISE (Japan)	Sep 19, 2026	0	
(Japan); Japanese	Ryu Ohira	(Japan) Krush (Japan)	Oct 31, 2026	0	

=== 51 kg / 112 lb ===
Name		Organization	Date	No. of title defenses	Source(s)
N/A	Vacant	(Japan) Krush (Japan)	N/A	N/A	

== Women ==
=== 70 kg / 154 lb ===
Name		Organization	Date	No. of title defenses	Source(s)
(Netherlands); Dutch	Marieke Calis	(Netherlands) Enfusion (Netherlands)	Sep 21, 2024	0	

=== 65 kg / 143 lb ===
Name		Organization	Date	No. of title defenses	Source(s)
N/A	Vacant	(Netherlands) Enfusion (Netherlands)	N/A	N/A	

=== 60 kg / 132 lb ===
Name		Organization	Date	No. of title defenses	Source(s)
(Hungary); Hungarian	Melinda Fabian (135 lbs)	(United States) Karate Combat (United States)	Dec 15, 2023	0	
N/A	Vacant (61 kg)	(Netherlands) Enfusion (Netherlands)	N/A	N/A	
(Estonia); Estonian	Astrid Johanna Grents	(Lithuania) KOK (Lithuania)	Oct 15, 2022	1	
(Croatia); Croatian	Karmela Makelja	(Croatia) Arena Golden Fight (Croatia)	April 4, 2025	1	

=== 57.5 kg / 127 lb ===
Name		Organization	Date	No. of title defenses	Source(s)
(Austria); Austrian	Stella Hemetsberger (125 lb)	(Singapore) ONE Championship (Singapore)	Feb 14, 2026	0	
(Brazil); Brazilian	Aline Pereira (127 lb)	(United States) Karate Combat (United States)	Jul 19, 2025	0	
(Netherlands); Dutch	Valence Bickel	(Netherlands) Enfusion (Netherlands)	Nov 14, 2026	0	
(Germany); German	Charly Glaser (57 kg)	(Italy) Fight Clubbing (Italy)	Nov 22, 2025	1	
(Netherlands); Dutch	Valence Bickel (57 kg)	(Germany) IFP - International Fight Promotion (Germany)	Oct 10, 2026	0	

=== 55 kg / 121 lb ===
Name		Organization	Date	No. of title defenses	Source(s)
(Netherlands); Dutch	Kyara van der Klooster (54 kg)	(Netherlands) Enfusion (Netherlands)	Nov 2, 2024	1	
(Netherlands); Dutch	Cheyenne Aldus	(Germany) IFP - International Fight Promotion (Germany)	Dec 14, 2025	0	

=== 52 kg / 115 lb ===
Name		Organization	Date	No. of title defenses	Source(s)
(Thailand); Thai	Phetjeeja Lukjaoporongtom	(Singapore) ONE Championship (Singapore)	March 9, 2024	1	
(Japan); Japanese	Saho Yoshino	(Japan) K-1 (Japan)	March 20, 2024	3	
(Brazil); Brazilian	Sthefanie Oliveira	(United States) Karate Combat (United States)	Nov 3, 2023	0	
(Netherlands); Dutch	Tessa de Kom	(Netherlands) Enfusion (Netherlands)	Sep 17, 2022	1	
(Greece); Greek	Sofia Tsolakidou	(Japan) Krush (Japan)	Aug 23, 2025	0	
(Argentina); Argentinian	Giuliana Cosnard	(Brazil) WGP Kickboxing (Brazil)	Dec 21, 2024	0	
(Italy); Italian	Alessia Muroni	(Italy) Fight Clubbing (Italy)	May 24, 2025	0	
(Netherlands); Dutch	Tessa de Kom	(Germany) IFP - International Fight Promotion (Germany)	May 23, 2026	0	

=== 48 kg / 106 lb ===
Name		Organization	Date	No. of title defenses	Source(s)
N/A	Vacant	(Japan) Krush (Japan)	N/A	N/A	

=== 45 kg / 99 lb ===
Name		Organization	Date	No. of title defenses	Source(s)
(Japan); Japanese	Aki Suematsu	(Japan) K-1 (Japan)	Jul 20, 2026	0	
N/A	Vacant	(Japan) Krush (Japan)	N/A	N/A	
(Japan); Japanese	Koto Hiraoka (46 kg)	(Japan) Knock Out (Japan)	Sep 5, 2026	0	

== See also ==
- List of kickboxing organizations
- List of current world boxing champions
- List of current female boxing champions
- List of current mixed martial arts champions
