= Kaunas Marathon =

Road running event in Kaunas, Lithuania

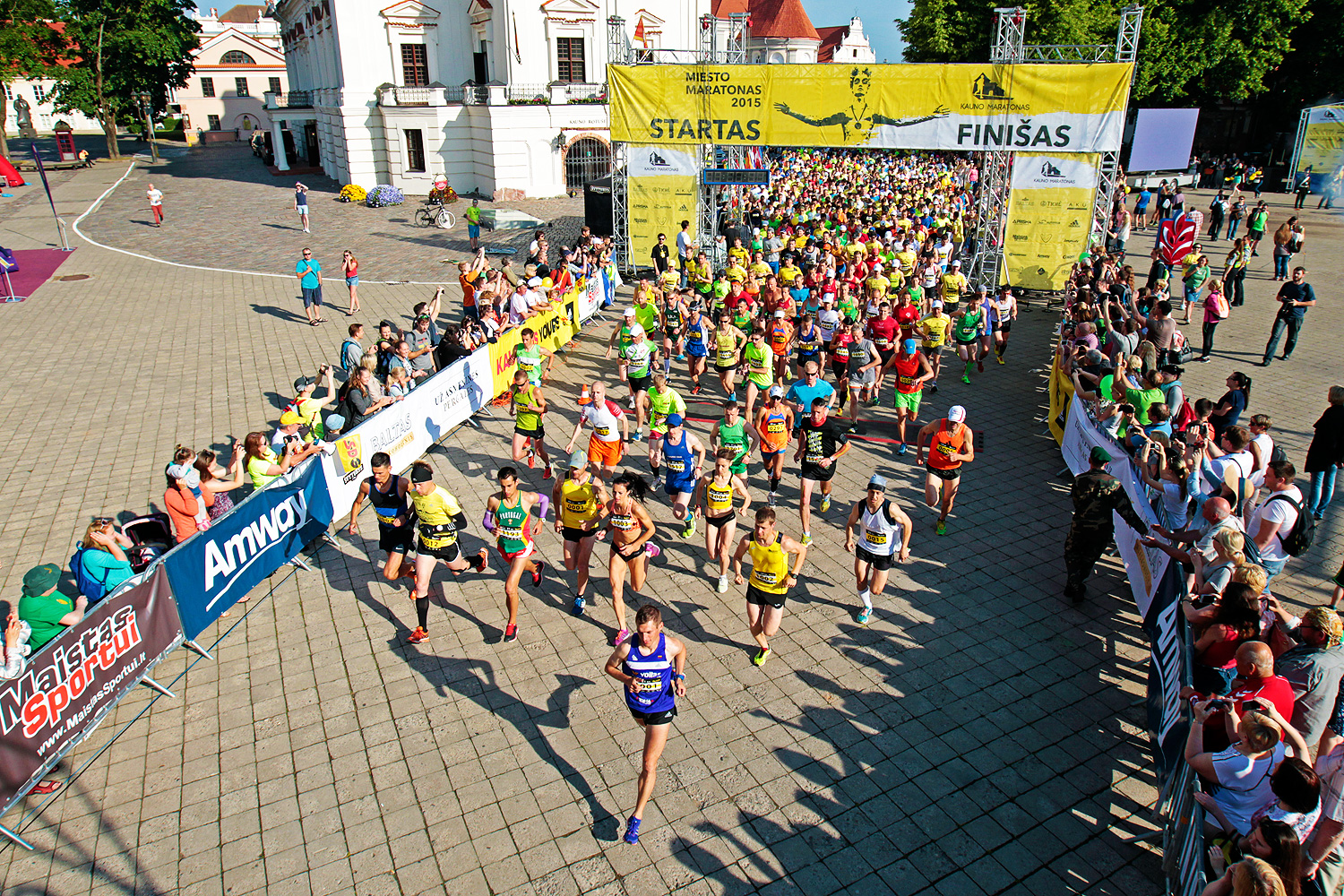
- Kaunas Marathon in 2015
- Date: 2023 April 24th
- Location: Kaunas
- Event type: Road
- Distance: Marathon, Half marathon
- Primary sponsor: Akropolis
- Established: 2013
- Course records: Men's: 2:17:17 (2022) (Lithuania) Remigijus Kančys; Women's: 2:47:52 (2024) (Ukraine) Mariya Radko
- Website: Kaunas Marathon

The Kaunas International Marathon (Lithuanian: Kauno tarptautinis maratonas) is an annual international road marathon event, held in Kaunas, Lithuania. Race offers marathon, half marathon.

The first edition of the Kaunas Marathon was held in 2013.

== Winners ==
Key: Course record

Edition	Year	Men's winner	Time (min:sec)	Women's winner	Time (h:m:s)
1st	2013	Tomas Venckūnas (LTU)	2:39:52	Sada Bukšnienė-Eidikyté (LTU)	3:27:28
2nd	2014	Aurimas Skinulis (LTU)	2:28:18	Elena Simonok (UKR)	3:06:43
3rd	2015	Aurimas Skinulis (LTU)	2:39:30	Antonia Johnson (NZL)	3:15:48
4th	2016	Mathew Sigei (KEN)	2:26:39	Leah Kusar (KEN)	3:02:53
5th	2017	Mindaugas Viršilas (LTU)	2:23:49	Natalja Kan (RUS)	2:52:17
6th	2018	Andrej Jegorov (LTU)	2:32:42	Iryna Masnyk (UKR)	2:56:12
7th	2019	Remigijus Kančys (LTU)	2:18:36	Iryna Masnyk (UKR)	2:51:43
8th	2022	Remigijus Kančys (LTU)	2:17:17	Veronika Kalashnikova (UKR)	3:07:22
9th	2023	Modestas Dirsė (LTU)	2:28:30	Gitana Akmanavičiūtė (LTU)	2:50:34
10th	2024	Modestas Dirsė (LTU)	2:25:49	Mariya Radko (UKR)	2:47:52
11th	2025	Lukas Tarasevičius (LTU)	2:21:51	Zita Kosač (LTU)	2:52:49

=== Wins by country ===
Country	Men's	Women's	Total
Lithuania	10	3	13
Ukraine	0	5	5
Kenya	1	1	2
New Zealand	0	1	1
Russia	0	1	1
