= Ahavat Hashem Gordon =

Israeli Muay Thai fighter and kickboxer

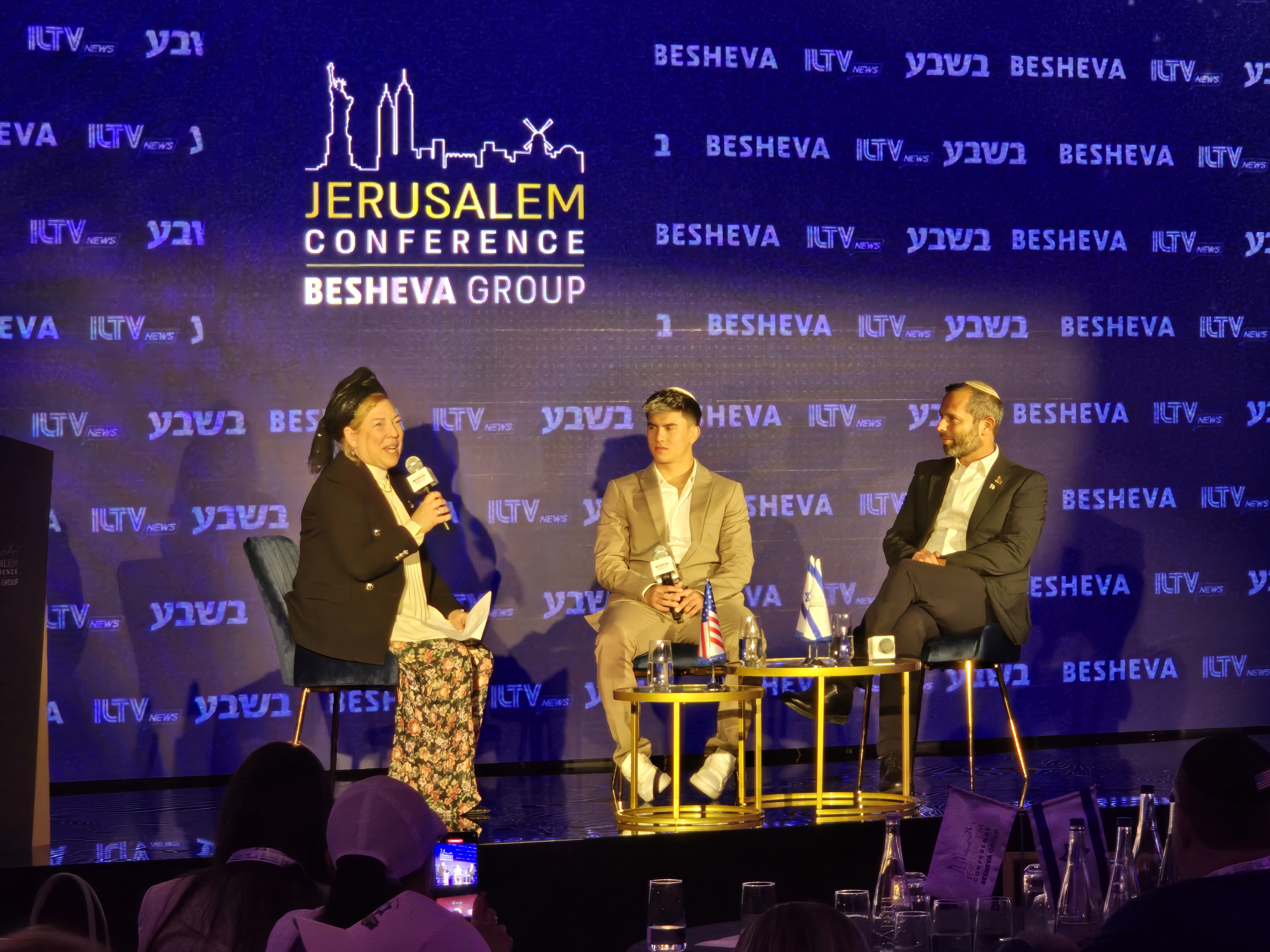
- Ahavat Hashem Gordon, 2025
- Born: May 2, 2006 (age 20); Shilo, Israel
- Native name: אהבת השם גורדון
- Nationality: Israeli
- Height: 1.72 m (5 ft 8 in)
- Division: Flyweight (Under 60 kg)
- Style: Muay Thai, Kickboxing
- Team: Silapa Thai Gym
- Years active: 2014–present

Ahavat Hashem Gordon (Hebrew: אהבת השם גורדון; born May 2, 2006) is an Israeli professional Muay Thai fighter and kickboxer. Gordon currently competes in international promotions, including ONE Championship and the Unique and Talented Martial Artists (UTMA) organization.

== Early life and background ==
Gordon was born in Shilo, Israel, the youngest of seven children. His family made Aliyah (immigrated to Israel) before he was born. His father, Dr. Azriel Gordon, was an American-born chiropractor and sports enthusiast, and his mother, Chaninat Hashem, is a Hong Kong-born convert to Judaism of Asian descent who works as a fitness instructor. At the age of 14, his family relocated to Zikhron Ya'akov.

Gordon began training in martial arts at the age of seven, initially focusing on Muay Thai before transitioning to kickboxing. He comes from a family deeply involved in martial arts; his older brother, Ruach Hashem Gordon, is also an accomplished Muay Thai fighter. Gordon trains at the "Silapa Thai Gym" in Ma'alot-Tarshiha under head coach Alex Drai.

== Amateur career ==
Gordon gained international prominence early in his youth career. At age 10, he won first place at the European Youth Kickboxing Cup in the under-60 kg category.

In 2022, Gordon won the Youth World Kickboxing Championship in Italy, first place at the European Cups in Croatia, Serbia, and Turkey, and the Israeli Youth Championship title in the under-60 kg division.

In 2023, Gordon won a bronze medal at the Under-23 World Championships.

== Professional career ==
Prior to joining ONE Championship, Gordon competed under the Rajadamnern World Series promotion, winning by technical knockout in the third round against Petchmedmai Gor.Kesanon on March 9, 2024, at Rajadamnern Stadium in Bangkok.

=== ONE Championship ===
On March 21, 2025, Gordon made his promotional debut in ONE Championship at ONE Friday Fights 101, facing Myanmar's Eh Mwi in a flyweight Muay Thai bout. Gordon won by unanimous decision.

On July 4, 2025, Gordon faced Thai fighter Seksan Fairtex at ONE Friday Fights 115 in a flyweight Muay Thai bout, again winning by unanimous decision.

=== UTMA ===
In late 2025, Gordon began competing in the Lithuanian martial arts promotion UTMA. In November 2025, he defeated Lithuanian-Irish fighter Nauris Bartoška via a second-round knockout (KO).

On February 21, 2026, Gordon faced Turkish fighter Ali Koyuncu at UTMA. He defeated Koyuncu via technical knockout (TKO) in the second round.

Gordon also competed at UTMA 18, defeating Andrés Vázquez by knockout in the first round.

== Personal life ==
Gordon is known for his vocal commitment to his Jewish faith and Israeli nationality. He frequently enters the ring wearing traditional Jewish garments, including a kippah and tzitzit, alongside the Israeli flag.

Ahead of his February 21, 2026, bout against Ali Koyuncu, Gordon entered the ring wearing tzitzit and a kippah to the sound of a song by singer Ben Tzur based on the verse "The Lord will reign forever and ever".

Gordon married Oren Levy on August 23, 2026.

== Championships and accomplishments ==
- Amateur Kickboxing / Muay Thai
  - 2022 Youth World Kickboxing Championship (Italy) – Gold Medalist
  - 2022 European Cups (Croatia, Serbia, Turkey) – Gold Medalist
  - 2022 Israeli Youth Championship – Gold Medalist
  - 2023 Under-23 World Championship – Bronze Medalist
