= Sagiv Cohen =

Sagiv Cohen may refer to:

- Sagiv Cohen (musician) (born 1975), Israeli singer
- Sagiv Cohen (footballer) (born 1987), Israeli professional footballer
