= John Lineker =

Brazilian mixed martial arts fighter

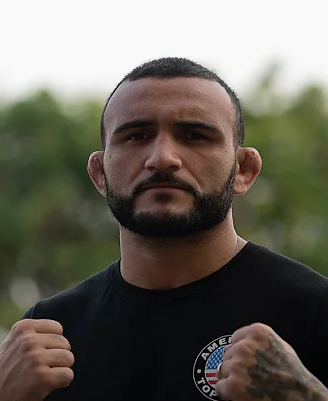
- Lineker in 2019
- Born: John Lineker dos Santos de Paula; June 12, 1990 (age 36); Paranaguá, Paraná, Brazil
- Other names: Mão-de-Pedra (Hands of Stone)
- Height: 5 ft 3 in (160 cm)
- Weight: 155 lb (70 kg; 11 st 1 lb)
- Division: Flyweight; Bantamweight; Featherweight (Note: While competing for ONE Championship, Lineker competes at 145 lbs (66 kg). ONE Championship refers to their 145 lb weight class as Bantamweight, but per the Association of Boxing Commissions in the United States, 145 lbs is considered Featherweight.); Lightweight
- Reach: 67 in (170 cm)
- Fighting out of: Paranagua, Paraná, Brazil
- Team: EMPORIUM (until 2014); OCS Jiu-Jitsu (2014–present); American Top Team (2015–present)
- Rank: Brown belt in Brazilian Jiu-Jitsu under Ocimar Costa
- Years active: 2008–present (MMA); 2024–present (Muay Thai)

Kickboxing record
- Total: 6
- Wins: 2
- By knockout: 2
- Losses: 4
- By knockout: 1

Mixed martial arts record
- Total: 49
- Wins: 37
- By knockout: 18
- By submission: 4
- By decision: 14
- By disqualification: 1
- Losses: 11
- By knockout: 1
- By submission: 4
- By decision: 6
- No contests: 1

Other information
- Mixed martial arts record from Sherdog

John Lineker (born June 12, 1990) is a Brazilian Muay Thai kickboxer and mixed martial artist. Lineker formerly competed in the bantamweight and flyweight divisions of the Ultimate Fighting Championship and ONE Championship, where he was the former ONE Bantamweight MMA World Champion.

== Mixed martial arts career ==
=== Early career ===
Lineker competed in various promotions in his native Brazil, including Samurai FC, Shooto Americas, and Jungle Fight. He is the former Jungle Fight Bantamweight Champion and Nitrix Fights 2011 Bantamweight Grand Prix Champion.

Lineker made his professional MMA debut in September 2008. Originally he fought in the lightweight and featherweight divisions, outside of his natural weight class. He competed 11 times in the first 15 months of his career, resulting in a lackluster record of six wins and five losses.

Beginning in 2010, Lineker moved down in weight classes to the bantamweight and flyweight divisions. After that move, he was undefeated in the 13 bouts prior to his UFC debut.

=== Ultimate Fighting Championship ===
In December 2011, it was announced that Lineker had signed with the Ultimate Fighting Championship to compete in their new flyweight division.

Lineker made his UFC debut against Louis Gaudinot at UFC on Fox: Diaz vs. Miller on May 5, 2012. The bout was contested at a catchweight of 127 lb, as Lineker missed weight. Gaudinot defeated Lineker via technical submission (guillotine choke) in the 2nd round after an action-packed, back-and-forth first two rounds. Both participants earned $65,000 Fight of the Night honors for their performances.

Lineker was expected to face Yasuhiro Urushitani on September 1, 2012, at UFC 151. However, after UFC 151 was cancelled, Lineker/Urushitani was rescheduled and took place on November 10, 2012, at UFC on Fuel TV 6. In a competitive three rounds, Lineker's power was the difference in the fight as he edged Urushitani via unanimous decision.

For his third UFC fight, Lineker faced Azamat Gashimov on May 18, 2013, at UFC on FX 8. He won the fight via TKO in the second round.

Lineker was expected to face Phil Harris on August 3, 2013, at UFC 163. However, Harris was forced out of the bout and Lineker instead faced promotional newcomer José Maria. Lineker missed the 126 pound weight limit for a non-title flyweight fight, weighing in at 129 pounds. As a result, he surrendered 20 percent of his purse to his opponent and the bout was changed to a 129-pound catchweight affair. After a back-and-forth first round, Lineker won the fight via TKO in the second round.

Following that victory, Lineker was once again scheduled to face off against Phil Harris on October 26, 2013, at UFC Fight Night 30, and he won the fight by TKO. Lineker missed weight for the third time in his UFC career, causing his camp to re-assess his weight class.

Lineker faced Ali Bagautinov on February 1, 2014, at UFC 169. Lineker again missed weight on his first attempt. He was allowed one hour to make the weight and succeeded after 45 minutes. He lost the fight via unanimous decision.

Lineker faced Alp Ozkilic on July 16, 2014, at UFC Fight Night 45. He won the fight via KO due to punches in the third round. The win also garnered Lineker his second Fight of the Night bonus award.

Lineker was expected to face Ian McCall on November 8, 2014, at UFC Fight Night 56 as the co-main event. However, just hours after both fighters had successfully made weight, it was announced that Mccall had been pulled from the event due to a blood infection. The bout was scrapped from the event entirely.

The bout with McCall eventually took place on January 31, 2015, at UFC 183. At the weigh in, Lineker again failed to make the flyweight weight limit. He was over by four pounds and was subsequently fined 30% of this purse. Because of the repeated failed weigh ins, he was forced to move up to the bantamweight division (135lb). He won the bout by unanimous decision.

Making his bantamweight return, Lineker faced Francisco Rivera in a bantamweight bout on September 5, 2015 at UFC 191. He won the fight via submission in the first round. The wild slugfest earned both participants, Fight of the Night honors.

Lineker was expected to face Cody Garbrandt on February 21, 2016, at UFC Fight Night 83. However, Lineker pulled out of the fight during the week leading up to the event citing illness and was replaced by Augusto Mendes.

Lineker faced Rob Font on May 14, 2016, at UFC 198. He won the fight via unanimous decision in round 3.

Lineker next faced Michael McDonald on July 13, 2016, at UFC Fight Night 91. He won the fight via knockout in the first round and was awarded a Performance of the Night bonus.

Lineker faced John Dodson on October 1, 2016, at UFC Fight Night 96. The bout took place at a catchweight of 136.5 lbs as Lineker missed weight. He won the back and forth fight via split decision.

Lineker faced former UFC Bantamweight Champion T.J. Dillashaw on December 30, 2016, at UFC 207. He lost via unanimous decision.

Lineker faced Marlon Vera on October 28, 2017, at UFC Fight Night 119. He won the fight via unanimous decision.

Lineker was scheduled to face Jimmie Rivera on December 30, 2017 at UFC 219, replacing the injured Dominick Cruz. On December 24, it was reported that Lineker was forced to pull from the fight due to tooth infection. Subsequently the fight was cancelled.

Lineker faced Brian Kelleher on May 12, 2018, at UFC 224. He won the fight via knockout in the third round.

Lineker was expected to face Dominick Cruz on January 26, 2019, at UFC 233. It was reported on December 11, 2018 that Cruz injured his shoulder and pulled out of the fight. As a result of the cancellation of UFC 233, Lineker was rescheduled to face Cory Sandhagen at UFC Fight Night 143. However, it was reported on January 10, 2019, that Lineker was pulled from the bout due to rib injury.

The bout with Sandhagen was rescheduled and eventually took place on April 27, 2019, at UFC Fight Night: Jacaré vs. Hermansson. Lineker lost the fight via split decision.

Lineker was scheduled to face Rob Font on June 22, 2019, at UFC Fight Night 154, replacing injured Cody Stamann. In turn, Lineker was pulled from the bout for undisclosed reasons.

On July 2, 2019, it was announced that Lineker had been released by UFC, and was signed by ONE Championship on July 8, 2019.

=== ONE Championship ===
Lineker made his promotional debut against Muin Gafurov at ONE Championship: Dawn Of Valor on October 26, 2019. He won the fight by unanimous decision.

Lineker made his sophomore appearance in the organization against Kevin Belingon at ONE Championship: Inside the Matrix 3 on November 13, 2020. He defeated Belingon by second-round technical knockout.

Lineker was scheduled to face Stephen Loman at ONE on TNT 4 on April 28, 2021. Loman would later withdraw from the card, as he tested positive for COVID-19, and was replaced by Troy Worthen. He won the bout via KO in the first round.

==== ONE Bantamweight World Champion ====
Lineker was scheduled to face reigning champion Bibiano Fernandes for the ONE Bantamweight Championship at ONE: X on December 3, 2021. However due to the pandemic, the event was postponed and the bout was moved to ONE: Bad Blood on February 11, 2022. Lineker tested positive for COVID days before the event and the bout was pulled. The bout was rescheduled for ONE: Lights Out on March 11, 2022. Lineker won the fight by second-round knockout to become the new ONE Bantamweight World Champion. The win also earned him a Performance of the Night bonus.

Lineker was scheduled to make his first bantamweight title defense against Fabrício Andrade at ONE on Prime Video 3 on October 21, 2022. At weigh-ins, John Lineker missed weight, coming in at 145.75 lbs, .75 pounds over the limit. Lineker was stripped of the ONE Bantamweight World Championship and the bout proceeded at a catchweight with only Andrade being able to win the title. Andrade also got 20% of his purse. During the beginning of the third round, Andrade accidentally connected with a strike to the groin of Lineker, who could not continue. The fight was declared a no contest.

A rematch between Lineker and Andrade for the vacant ONE Bantamweight World Championship took place on February 25, 2023, at ONE Fight Night 7. He lost the bout by technical knockout after his corner stopped the fight after the fourth round.

==== Post-championship ====
Lineker faced Kim Jae-woong on August 5, 2023, at ONE Fight Night 13. At the weigh-ins, Lineker weighed in at 151 pounds, 6 pounds over the bantamweight limit. The bouts proceeded at catchweight with him being fined 25% his individual purse, which went to Kim. He won the bout via technical knockout in the third round.

Lineker faced Stephen Loman on September 30, 2023, at ONE Fight Night 14. He won the fight via unanimous decision.

Replacing Sage Northcutt on short notice, Lineker faced Shinya Aoki in a openweight bout on January 28, 2024, at ONE 165. He lost the fight by rear-naked submission in the first round.

== Muay Thai and kickboxing career ==
=== ONE Championship ===
Lineker was scheduled to make his Muay Thai debut against Liam Harrison on January 13, 2024, at ONE Fight Night 18. However, Harrison suffered a knee injury and the bout was scrapped.

Lineker faced Asa Ten Pow on September 6, 2024, at ONE 168. He won the fight via knockout in the second round.

Lineker faced Alexey Balyko on October 5, 2024, at ONE Fight Night 25. He won the fight via knockout in the first round and this win earned the Performance of the Night bonuses.

Lineker faced Kulabdam Sor.Jor.Piek-U-Thai on January 11, 2025, at ONE Fight Night 27. At the weigh-ins, both fighters failed multiple hydration tests and the bout proceeded at a catchweight of 150.75 pounds. He lost the fight via unanimous decision.

Lineker made his kickboxing debut against Hiroki Akimoto on March 23, 2025, at ONE 172. He lost the fight via split decision.

On May 14, 2026, it was announced that Kingad was released from ONE Championship.

=== GFN1 ===
On July 27, 2026, Lineker lost against Ahavat Hashem Gordon.

== Personal life ==
Lineker and his wife, Jacklyne, have five children.

== Championships and accomplishments ==
- ONE Championship
  - ONE Bantamweight World Championship (One time)
  - Performance of the Night (Three times) vs. Bibiano Fernandes, Asa Ten Pow and Alexey Balyko
- Ultimate Fighting Championship
  - Fight of the Night (Three times) vs. Louis Gaudinot, Alp Ozkilic and Francisco Rivera
  - Performance of the Night (One time) vs. Michael McDonald
  - Tied (Deiveson Figueiredo, Dustin Ortiz, Alex Perez & Joshua Van) for third most knockouts in UFC Flyweight division history (4)
  - Tied (Bruno Gustavo da Silva) for fifth most knockdowns in UFC Flyweight division history (7)
  - Holds the record for most weight misses in UFC history (5)
  - UFC.com Awards
    - 2012: Ranked #10 Fight of the Year vs. Louis Gaudinot
    - 2015: Ranked #5 Fight of the Year vs. Francisco Rivera
- Jungle Fight
  - Jungle Fight Bantamweight Championship (one time)
- Nitrix Champion Fight
  - Nitrix Fights Bantamweight Grand Prix

== Mixed martial arts record ==
Professional record breakdown
49 matches	37 wins	11 losses
By knockout	18	1
By submission	4	4
By decision	14	6
By disqualification	1	0
No contests	1	

Res.	Record	Opponent	Method	Event	Date	Round	Time	Location	Notes
Loss	37–11 (1)	Shinya Aoki	Submission (rear-naked choke)	ONE 165	January 28, 2024	1	3:00	Tokyo, Japan	Openweight bout.
Win	37–10 (1)	Stephen Loman	Decision (unanimous)	ONE Fight Night 14	September 30, 2023	3	5:00	Kallang, Singapore	
Win	36–10 (1)	Kim Jae-woong	KO (punches)	ONE Fight Night 13	August 5, 2023	3	4:56	Bangkok, Thailand	Catchweight (151 lb) bout; Lineker missed weight.
Loss	35–10 (1)	Fabrício Andrade	TKO (corner stoppage)	ONE Fight Night 7	February 25, 2023	4	5:00	Bangkok, Thailand	For the vacant ONE Bantamweight Championship (145 lb).
NC	35–9 (1)	Fabrício Andrade	NC (accidental knee to groin)	ONE on Prime Video 3	October 22, 2022	3	2:44	Kuala Lumpur, Malaysia	Lineker missed weight (145.75 lb) and was stripped of the ONE Bantamweight Championship (145 lb). Only Andrade was eligible to win the title. Accidental knee to the groin rendered Lineker unable to continue.
Win	35–9	Bibiano Fernandes	KO (punch)	ONE: Lights Out	March 11, 2022	2	3:40	Kallang, Singapore	Won the ONE Bantamweight Championship (145 lb). Performance of the Night.
Win	34–9	Troy Worthen	KO (punch)	ONE on TNT 3	April 21, 2021	1	4:35	Kallang, Singapore	
Win	33–9	Kevin Belingon	TKO (punches)	ONE: Inside the Matrix 3	November 13, 2020	2	1:16	Kallang, Singapore	
Win	32–9	Muin Gafurov	Decision (unanimous)	ONE: Dawn of Valor	October 26, 2019	3	5:00	Jakarta, Indonesia	Featherweight debut.
Loss	31–9	Cory Sandhagen	Decision (split)	UFC Fight Night: Jacaré vs. Hermansson	April 27, 2019	3	5:00	Sunrise, Florida, United States	
Win	31–8	Brian Kelleher	KO (punch)	UFC 224	May 12, 2018	3	3:43	Rio de Janeiro, Brazil	
Win	30–8	Marlon Vera	Decision (unanimous)	UFC Fight Night: Brunson vs. Machida	October 28, 2017	3	5:00	São Paulo, Brazil	
Loss	29–8	T.J. Dillashaw	Decision (unanimous)	UFC 207	December 30, 2016	3	5:00	Las Vegas, Nevada, United States	
Win	29–7	John Dodson	Decision (split)	UFC Fight Night: Lineker vs. Dodson	October 1, 2016	5	5:00	Portland, Oregon, United States	Catchweight (136.5 lb) bout; Lineker missed weight.
Win	28–7	Michael McDonald	KO (punches)	UFC Fight Night: McDonald vs. Lineker	July 13, 2016	1	2:43	Sioux Falls, South Dakota, United States	Performance of the Night.
Win	27–7	Rob Font	Decision (unanimous)	UFC 198	May 14, 2016	3	5:00	Curitiba, Brazil	
Win	26–7	Francisco Rivera	Submission (guillotine choke)	UFC 191	September 5, 2015	1	2:08	Las Vegas, Nevada, United States	Return to Bantamweight. Fight of the Night.
Win	25–7	Ian McCall	Decision (unanimous)	UFC 183	January 31, 2015	3	5:00	Las Vegas, Nevada, United States	Catchweight (130 lb) bout; Lineker missed weight.
Win	24–7	Alp Ozkilic	TKO (punches)	UFC Fight Night: Cowboy vs. Miller	July 16, 2014	3	4:51	Atlantic City, New Jersey, United States	Fight of the Night.
Loss	23–7	Ali Bagautinov	Decision (unanimous)	UFC 169	February 1, 2014	3	5:00	Newark, New Jersey, United States	UFC Flyweight title eliminator.
Win	23–6	Phil Harris	TKO (punches)	UFC Fight Night: Machida vs. Muñoz	October 26, 2013	1	2:51	Manchester, England	Catchweight (128 lb) bout; Lineker missed weight.
Win	22–6	José Maria Tomé	TKO (punches)	UFC 163	August 3, 2013	2	1:03	Rio de Janeiro, Brazil	Catchweight (129 lb) bout; Lineker missed weight.
Win	21–6	Azamat Gashimov	TKO (punches)	UFC on FX: Belfort vs. Rockhold	May 18, 2013	2	1:07	Jaraguá do Sul, Brazil	Gashimov was deducted one point in round 1 due to grabbing the cage.
Win	20–6	Yasuhiro Urushitani	Decision (unanimous)	UFC on Fuel TV: Franklin vs. Le	November 10, 2012	3	5:00	Macau, SAR, China	
Loss	19–6	Louis Gaudinot	Technical Submission (guillotine choke)	UFC on Fox: Diaz vs. Miller	May 5, 2012	2	4:54	East Rutherford, New Jersey, United States	Flyweight debut; Lineker missed weight (127 lb). Fight of the Night.
Win	19–5	Iliarde Santos	Decision (split)	Jungle Fight 32	September 10, 2011	3	5:00	São Paulo, Brazil	Won the Jungle Fight Bantamweight Championship.
Win	18–5	Francisco Figueiredo	TKO (punches)	Jungle Fight 30	July 30, 2011	3	0:36	Belém, Brazil	
Win	17–5	Luiz Salgadinho	KO (punch)	Jungle Fight 28	May 21, 2011	1	1:18	Rio de Janeiro, Brazil	
Win	16–5	Renato Velame	Submission (rear-naked choke)	Jungle Fight 27	April 21, 2011	1	2:58	Brasília, Brazil	
Win	15–5	Saulo Martins	TKO (punches)	Shooto Brazil 22	April 1, 2011	1	3:30	Brasília, Brazil	
Win	14–5	Diego D'Avila	Decision (unanimous)	Nitrix Champion Fight 6	February 19, 2011	3	5:00	Brusque, Brazil	Won the Nitrix Fights Bantamweight Grand Prix.
Win	13–5	Alessandro Cordeiro	TKO (punches)	Nitrix Champion Fight 6	February 19, 2011	1	3:44	Brusque, Brazil	Nitrix Fights Bantamweight Grand Prix Semifinal.
Win	12–5	Felipe Alves	Submission (rear-naked choke)	Gladiators FC 2	October 16, 2010	2	2:05	Curitiba, Brazil	
Win	11–5	Alvino José Torres	Submission (rear-naked choke)	Shooto Brazil 18	September 17, 2010	2	N/A	Brasília, Brazil	
Win	10–5	Jetron Azevedo	Decision (unanimous)	Gladiators FC 1	May 8, 2010	3	5:00	Curitiba, Brazil	
Win	9–5	Israel Silva	Decision (unanimous)	K.O. Fight 3	April 10, 2010	3	5:00	Apucarana, Brazil	
Win	8–5	Larry Vargas	DQ (punches after the bell)	Full Heroes Battle 2	February 5, 2010	2	5:00	Paranaguá, Brazil	
Win	7–5	Cica Cica	Decision (unanimous)	Full Heroes Battle 2	February 5, 2010	3	5:00	Paranaguá, Brazil	
Loss	6–5	Rafael Silva	Decision (unanimous)	Warrior's Challenge 4	December 30, 2009	3	5:00	Porto Belo, Brazil	
Win	6–4	Wagner Campos	TKO (punches)	Brazilian Fight League 5	December 19, 2009	2	N/A	Curitiba, Brazil	
Loss	5–4	Andre Luis	Decision (unanimous)	Samurai Fight Combat 1	September 12, 2009	3	5:00	Curitiba, Brazil	
Loss	5–3	Erick Carlos Silva	Decision (unanimous)	Blackout FC 3	September 5, 2009	3	5:00	Balneário Camboriú, Brazil	
Loss	5–2	Felipe Arantes	Submission (armbar)	Paranagua Fight 5	August 7, 2009	1	1:12	Paranaguá, Brazil	
Win	5–1	Márcio Sapo	Decision (unanimous)	Nitrix Show Fight 2	May 16, 2009	3	5:00	Joinville, Brazil	
Win	4–1	Alexandre Chatuba	TKO (punches)	VIP Stage 3	May 2, 2009	2	N/A	Joinville, Brazil	
Loss	3–1	Nelson Velasques	Submission (rear-naked choke)	Golden Fighters 1	April 18, 2009	1	4:02	Novo Hamburgo, Brazil	
Win	3–0	Claudinei Rodriguez	Decision (unanimous)	Floripa Fight 5	March 7, 2009	3	5:00	Florianópolis, Brazil	
Win	2–0	Heriton Alves	KO (punches)	Paranagua Fight 3	November 11, 2008	1	N/A	Paranaguá, Brazil	
Win	1–0	Mauricio Alves	TKO (punches)	Paranagua Fight 2	September 5, 2008	2	1:25	Paranaguá, Brazil	Bantamweight debut.

== Muay Thai and Kickboxing record ==
Muay Thai Record
2 Wins, 4 Losses, 0 Draw
Date	Result	Opponent	Event	Location	Method	Round	Time
2026-07-27	Loss	(Israel) Ahavat Hashem Gordon	Gordon Fight Nights 1	Tel Aviv, Israel	Decision (unanimous)	3	3:00
2026-03-13	Loss	(United Kingdom) Ben Woolliss	ONE Fight Night 41	Bangkok, Thailand	KO (leg kick)	1	1:57
2025-03-23	Loss	(Japan) Hiroki Akimoto	ONE 172	Saitama, Japan	Decision (Split)	3	3:00
2025-01-11	Loss	(Thailand) Kulabdam Sor.Jor.Piek-U-Thai	ONE Fight Night 27	Bangkok, Thailand	Decision (Unanimous)	3	3:00
2024-10-05	Win	(Russia) Alexey Balyko	ONE Fight Night 25	Bangkok, Thailand	KO (punch)	1	2:14
2024-09-06	Win	(United States) Asa Ten Pow	ONE 168	Denver, Colorado, United States	KO (punch)	2	2:50
Legend: Win Loss Draw/No contest Notes

== See also ==
- List of male mixed martial artists
