= Kyo Kawakami =

Japanese kickboxer (born 1999)

- Born: Kyo Kawakami; December 3, 1999 (age 26); Osaka, Japan
- Native name: 川上 叶
- Height: 170 cm (5 ft 7 in)
- Weight: 57.0 kg (125.7 lb; 8.98 st)
- Style: Kickboxing
- Stance: Southpaw
- Fighting out of: Osaka, Japan
- Team: Ryusei Juku
- Years active: 2016-present

Kickboxing record
- Total: 28
- Wins: 17
- By knockout: 6
- Losses: 11
- By knockout: 2

Kyo Kawakami (Japanese: 川上 叶, Kawakami Kyo; born December 3, 1999) is a Japanese kickboxer. He is the former Shoot Boxing Japan Featherweight and Shoot Boxing Japan Bantamweight champion.

As of October 2022, he is ranked as the ninth best bantamweight in the world by Beyond Kick.

== Kickboxing career ==
=== Bantamweight ===
==== Early career ====
Kawakami had a notable amateur career which saw him winning multiple titles including the Shoot Boxing All Japan in 2015. in 2016 he won the WBC Muay Thai All Japan Junior League title and was elected MVP of the event, as a reward he received a one-month trip to Thailand.

Kawakami made his professional debut against Syuto Sato at SHOOT BOXING Osaka 2016 “Alpinisme vol.1” on August 13, 2016. He won the fight by a first-round standing choke submission. He won his next bout against Tsubasa Onishi at SHOOT BOXING Young Caesar Cup Central 18 on October 2, 2016, by stoppage as well, before being booked to face the unbeaten Koudai at SHOOT BOXING 2017 act.1 on February 11, 2017. He lost the fight by a second-round knockout.

Kawakami faced Kazuyuki Fushimi at SHOOT BOXING 2018 act.1 on February 10, 2018, in his first fight of the year. He won the bout by a flying knee knockout, at the 1:10 minute mark of the fourth round. Kawakami next faced Jin Uehira at SHOOT BOXING Osaka 2018 “Alpinisme” vol.1 on March 18, 2018. He needed just 79 seconds to stop Uehira with a body shot. Kawakami extended his winning streak to three consecutive fights with an extra round split decision win over Toshiyuki Nitamizu at SHOOT BOXING 2017 Young Caesar Cup Central 22 on May 20, 2018, in the quarterfinals of the Shootboxing bantamweight tournament.

Kawakami's three fight winning streak was snapped by the undefeated Yuki Kasahara at SHOOT BOXING 2018 act.4, who beat him by a first-round knockout, handing Kawakami his second career stoppage loss and eliminating him from the bantamweight tournament. Kawakami was next booked to face Keito Naito at SHOOT BOXING Osaka 2019 “Alpinisme” vol.1 on August 10, 2019. He won the fight by unanimous decision, with scores of 30–28, 30–28 and 30–29.

==== Shootboxing bantamweight champion ====
On November 11, 2019, Kawakami faced Syuto Sato for the inaugural Shoot Boxing Japan Bantamweight title at Shoot Boxing 2019 Young Caesar Cup Central #26. He won the fight by a second-round knockout, as he floored Sato with a left cross.

On November 14, 2020, Kawakami faced the reigning RISE super flyweight champion Kazuki Osaki in a non-title bout at RISE 143. He lost by unanimous decision.

Kawakami was scheduled to face the Yuki Kyotani at Rise World Series 2021 Osaka on July 18, 2021, in Osaka. He won the fight by unanimous decision, the three judges scoring the bout 30–29 in his favor.

=== Featherweight ===
Kawakami faced Kotaro Yamada at SHOOT BOXING 2021 Young Caesar Cup on December 19, 2021, in his first bout at the featherweight (-57.5 kg) limit. The fight was ruled a draw after the first three rounds, with all three judges scoring the fight 29–29. Accordingly, an extension round was fought, after which Kawakami was awarded a unanimous decision.

Kawakami faced Kaito for the vacant Shoot Boxing Japan Featherweight title at Shoot Boxing 2022 act.2 on April 10, 2022. He won the fight by majority decision, after an extra round was contested.

Kawakami faced Haruto Yasumoto at RISE WORLD SERIES / SHOOTBOXING-KINGS on December 25, 2022, in what was his third appearance with RISE. The bout was ruled a unanimous decision draw after the first three rounds, with all three judges scoring it 30–30. Kawakami was awarded a majority decision, after an extra fourth round was fought.

Kawakami faced Gaopayak Y'zdgym at SHOOT BOXING 2023 act.1 on February 12, 2023. He won the fight by unanimous decision, with scores of 30–29, 30–29 and 30–27.

Kawakami made his first Shoot Boxing Japan Featherweight title defense against Kotaro Yamada at SHOOT BOXING 2023 act.2 on April 30, 2023. He lost the fight by majority decision, with two judges awarding Yamada a narrow 50–49 scorecard, while the third judge scored the contest an even 50–50.

Kawakami faced the RISE featherweight champion Keisuke Monguchi in a non-title bout at RISE World Series 2023 - 1st Round on July 2, 2023. He lost the fight by majority decision. Two of the judges scored the bout 30–28 and 30–29 for Monguchi, while the third ringside official scored it an even 29–29.

Kawakami faced Toma Tanabe at K-1 ReBIRTH 2 on December 9, 2023. He won the fight by unanimous decision, with three scorecards of 30–28, after knocking Toma down once in the second round.

Kawakami was expected to face Ryusei Kumagai at KNOCK OUT 2024 vol.1 on February 25, 2023. The bout was postponed for KNOCK OUT 2024 vol.2 on April 27, 2024, as Ryusei withdrew due to illness on February 23. The fight was reschedule for KNOCK OUT 2024 vol.2 on April 27, 2024. Kawakami lost the fight by unanimous decision.

== Titles and accomplishments ==
=== Professional ===
- SHOOT BOXING
  - 2019 Shoot Boxing Japan Bantamweight Champion
  - 2022 Shoot Boxing Japan Featherweight Champion

=== Amateur ===
- 2014 Green Boy Fight Welterweight Champion
- 2015 Glove Karate Federation All Japan Championship -55 kg Winner
- 2015 Shoot Boxing All Japan -55 kg Champion
- 2016 WBC Muay Thai All Japan Jr League (U-18) -55 kg Champion & Event MVP

== Fight record ==
Kickboxing record
17 Wins (6 (T)KO's), 11 Losses, 0 Draw, 0 No Contest
Date	Result	Opponent	Event	Location	Method	Round	Time
2026-09-04	Win	(Australia) Isaiah Badato	ONE The Inner Circle 29, Lumpinee Stadium	Bangkok, Thailand	Decision (Unanimous)	3	3:00
2025-11-24	Loss	(Japan) Haruto Yasumoto	SHOOT BOXING 40th Anniversary - S-Cup, Quarterfinals	Tokyo, Japan	Decision (Unanimous)	3	3:00
2025-10-11	Win	(Japan) Knight Makino	SHOOT BOXING 2025 act.5	Tokyo, Japan	KO (Knee to the head)	2	0:43
2025-07-27	Win	(Japan) Ryota Naito	SHOOTBOXING 2025 “DEAD or ALIVE 11”	Kasugai, Japan	Decision (Unanimous)	3	3:00
2025-04-12	Loss	(Japan) Kotaro Yamada	SHOOT BOXING 2025 act.2	Tokyo, Japan	Decision (Majority)	5	3:00
For the Shoot Boxing Japan Featherweight title.
2025-02-08	Win	(Japan) Koyata Yamada	SHOOT BOXING 2025 act.1	Tokyo, Japan	Decision (Unanimous)	3	3:00
2024-04-27	Loss	(Japan) Ryusei	KNOCK OUT 2024 vol.2	Tokyo, Japan	Decision (Unanimous)	3	3:00
2023-12-09	Win	(Japan) Toma	K-1 ReBIRTH 2	Osaka, Japan	Decision (Unanimous)	3	3:00
2023-07-02	Loss	(Japan) Keisuke Monguchi	RISE World Series 2023 - 1st Round	Osaka, Japan	Decision (Majority)	3	3:00
2023-04-30	Loss	(Japan) Kotaro Yamada	SHOOT BOXING 2023 act.2	Tokyo, Japan	Decision (Majority)	5	3:00
Loses the Shoot Boxing Japan Featherweight title.
2023-02-12	Win	(Thailand) Gaopayak Y'zdgym	SHOOT BOXING 2023 act.1	Tokyo, Japan	Decision (Unanimous)	3	3:00
2022-12-25	Win	(Japan) Haruto Yasumoto	RISE WORLD SERIES / SHOOTBOXING-KINGS 2022	Tokyo, Japan	Ext.R Decision (Majority)	4	3:00
2022-04-10	Win	(Japan) Kaito Sakaguchi	SHOOT BOXING 2022 act.2	Tokyo, Japan	Ext.R Decision (Majority)	6	3:00
Wins the vacant Shoot Boxing Japan Featherweight title.
2021-12-19	Win	(Japan) Kotaro Yamada	SHOOT BOXING 2021 Young Caesar Cup	Tokyo, Japan	Ext.R Decision (Split)	4	3:00
2021-07-18	Win	(Japan) Yuki Kyotani	RISE World Series 2021 Osaka	Osaka, Japan	Decision (Unanimous)	3	3:00
2020-11-14	Loss	(Japan) Kazuki Osaki	RISE 143	Tokyo, Japan	Decision (Unanimous)	3	3:00
2019-11-24	Win	(Japan) Shuto Sato	SHOOT BOXING 2019 Young Caesar Cup Central 26	Kasugai, Aichi, Japan	KO (Left cross)	2	2:58
Wins the inaugural Shoot Boxing Japan Bantamweight title.
2019-08-10	Win	(Japan) Keito Naito	SHOOT BOXING Osaka 2019 “Alpinisme” vol.1	Osaka, Japan	Decision (Unanimous)	3	3:00
2018-09-15	Loss	(Japan) Yuki Kasahara	SHOOT BOXING 2018 act.4 - Championship Tournament Semi Final	Tokyo, Japan	KO (Left cross)	1	3:00
2018-05-20	Win	(Japan) Toshiyuki Nitamizu	SHOOT BOXING 2017 Young Caesar Cup Central 22 - Championship Tournament Quarter Final	Aichi prefecture, Japan	Ext.R Decision (Split)	4	3:00
2018-03-18	Win	(Japan) Jin Uehira	SHOOT BOXING Osaka 2018 “Alpinisme” vol.1	Osaka, Japan	KO (Body shot)	1	1:19
2018-02-10	Win	(Japan) Kazuyuki Fushimi	SHOOT BOXING 2018 act.1	Tokyo, Japan	Ext.R KO (Flying knee)	4	1:10
2017-10-15	Loss	(Japan) Hiroaki Okuwa	SHOOT BOXING 2017 Young Caesar Cup Central 21	Kasugai, Aichi, Japan	Decision (Unanimous)	3	3:00
2017-05-28	Loss	(Japan) Itsuki Kobori	HIGHSPEED 2017 ～STATUS～	Osaka, Japan	Decision (Split)	3	3:00
2017-03-11	Loss	(Japan) Genki Takeno	SHOOT BOXING 2017 Young Caesar Cup act.1	Tokyo, Japan	Decision (Majority)	3	3:00
2017-02-11	Loss	(Japan) Koudai	SHOOT BOXING 2017 act.1	Tokyo, Japan	KO (Right cross)	2	2:02
2016-10-02	Win	(Japan) Tsubasa Onishi	SHOOT BOXING Young Caesar Cup Central 18	Kasugai, Aichi, Japan	KO	3	
2016-08-13	Win	(Japan) Shuto Sato	SHOOT BOXING Osaka 2016 “Alpinisme vol.1”	Osaka, Japan	TKO (Standing choke)	3	1:00
Legend: Win Loss Draw/No contest Notes

=== Amateur record ===
Amateur Kickboxing Record
Date	Result	Opponent	Event	Location	Method	Round	Time
2016-07-23	Win	(Japan)	2nd WBC Muay Thai All Japan Jr. League, Final	Tokyo, Japan	Decision	2	2:00
Wins WBC Muay Thai All Japan Jr League (U-18) -55kg title
2016-07-23	Win	(Japan) Ryuto Nakamura	2nd WBC Muay Thai All Japan Jr. League, Semi Final	Tokyo, Japan	Decision	2	2:00
2016-05-21	Win	(Japan) Nobuhide Toyooka	S-1 Amateur Kick vol.7	Nara, Japan	Decision	2	2:00
2016-04-10	Loss	(Japan) Kaito Yamawaki	NJKF West Japan YOUNG FIGHT 1st	Osaka, Japan	Decision (Unanimous)	3	1:00
2016-01-24	Win	(Japan) Satoru Shimizu	Amateur Shoot Boxing All Japan Championship	Tokyo, Japan	Decision (Unanimous)	2	2:00
Wins Shoot Boxing All Japan Amateur -55kg title
2015-12-20	Win	(Japan) Yu Morikawa	S-1 Amateur Kick vol.5	Sakai, Japan	Decision	2	2:00
2015-11-15	Win	(Japan) Keito Naito	Amateur Shoot Boxing Kansai	Osaka, Japan	Ext.R Decision (Split)	3	2:00
2015-10-03	Loss	(Japan) Riku Kitani	Amateur Shootboxing	Tokyo, Japan	Decision (Unanimous)	2	2:00
2015-04-12	Win	(Japan) Tomoya Nishida	Amateur Shoot Boxing Kansai	Kansai, Japan	Decision (Unanimous)	2	2:00
2014-12-21	Loss	(Japan) Toki Tamaru	All Japan Amateur Shootboxing	Tokyo, Japan	Decision (Unanimous)	2	2:00
For the Shoot Boxing All Japan Amateur -45kg title
2014-11-23	Win	(Japan) Sota Kimura	NEXT LEVEL Kansai 18	Sakai, Japan	Decision (Unanimous)	2	2:00
2014-11-16	Win	(Japan) Makoto Matsuo	Hoost Cup KINGS WEST	Osaka, Japan	Decision (Unanimous)	2	2:00
2014-10-13	Loss	(Japan) Haruto Yasumoto	MUAYTHAI WINDY SUPER FIGHT vol.18 in KYOTO	Kyoto, Japan	Decision (Unanimous)	2	2:00
2014-10-05	Win	(Japan) Kaito Nagashima	Striking Challenge 42, All Japan Shootboxing selection	Nagoya, Japan	Decision (Unanimous)	2	2:00
2014-09-23	Win	(Japan) Ryunosuke Abiru	NEXT LEVEL Kansai 17	Sakai, Japan	Decision (Unanimous)	2	2:00
2014-09-14	Win	(Japan)	Shoot Boxing Amateur Kansai tournament, Final	Osaka, Japan	Decision	1	2:00
2014-09-14	Win	(Japan)	Shoot Boxing Amateur Kansai tournament, Semi Final	Osaka, Japan	Decision	1	2:00
2014-07-30	Win	(Japan) Jui Nishiyama	Green Boy Fight 8	Kyoto, Japan	Decision	2	2:00
Wins Green Boy Fight Welterweight title
2014-06-29	Win	(Japan) Yuki Kasahara	Amateur Shootboxing Kansai	Osaka, Japan	Ext.R Decision (Unanimous)	3	2:00
2014-03-16	Win	(Japan) Taiki Kaminoura	NEXT LEVEL Kansai 13	Sakai, Japan	Decision (Unanimous)	2	2:00
2014-03-16	Win	(Japan) Shinya Hirota	NEXT LEVEL Kansai 13	Sakai, Japan	Decision (Unanimous)	2	2:00
2014-02-16	Win	(Japan) Ayumu Mita	Shoot Boxing Amateur Kansai	Osaka, Japan	Decision (Majority)	2	2:00
2013-04-14	Loss	(Japan) Kaito Sakaguchi	Shoot Boxing Amateur Kansai	Kansai, Japan	Decision (Unanimous)	2	2:00
2013-04-14	Loss	(Japan) Katsuya Aoki	NEXT LEVEL Kansai 6	Kansai, Japan	Decision (Majority)	2	2:00
2013-02-24	Win	(Japan) Aoshi Kitano	Amateur Shootboxing	Osaka, Japan	Decision (Unanimous)	2	2:00
2013-01-27	Loss	(Japan) Katsuya Aoki	NEXT LEVEL Kansai 4	Sakai, Japan	Decision (Majority)	2	2:00
2013-01-20	Draw	(Japan) Musashi Kajiwara	Kameoka Winter Festival 2013	Kameoka, Japan	Decision	2	2:00
2012-12-16	Win	(Japan) Shuma Sasaki	NEXT LEVEL Kansai 3	Osaka, Japan	Decision (Majority)	2	2:00
2012-09-23	Loss	(Japan) Riona Ishikawa	NEXT LEVEL, Semi Final	Sakai, Japan	Decision (Unanimous)	2	2:00
2012-07-16	Draw	(Japan) Makoto Matsuo	NEXT LEVEL	Sakai, Japan	Decision (Unanimous)	2	2:00
2012-05-06	Draw	(Japan) Yosuke Sekimoto	NEXT LEVEL	Higashioka, Japan	Decision	2	2:00
Legend: Win Loss Draw/No contest Notes

== See also ==
- List of male kickboxers
