= Kotaro Yamada =

Japanese kickboxer (born 2003)

- Born: 山田 彪太朗; January 18, 2003 (age 23); Taitō, Tokyo, Japan
- Other names: Explosive Twin Beast
- Height: 165 cm (5 ft 5 in)
- Weight: 57.5 kg (127 lb; 9.05 st)
- Style: Shoot boxing
- Stance: Orthodox
- Fighting out of: Tokyo, Japan
- Team: Caesar Gym
- Years active: 2019 - present

Kickboxing record
- Total: 30
- Wins: 25
- By knockout: 9
- Losses: 4
- By knockout: 1
- No contests: 1

Other information
- Notable relatives: Koyata Yamada (twin brother)

Kotaro Yamada (Japanese: 山田 彪太朗, Yamada Kotaro; born January 18, 2003) is a Japanese kickboxer and the current Shootboxing Japan Featherweight champion.

As of May 2023 he was the #8 ranked bantamweight in the world by Beyond Kick.

== Professional career ==
=== Shootboxing ===
==== Early career ====
Yamada made his professional debut against Chihiro Sugiyama at SHOOT BOXING Hanayashiki Extreme.2 on August 24, 2019. He won the fight by unanimous decision, with two judges awarding him a 30–29 and a 30–28 scorecard respectively, while the third judge scored the fight as an even 29–29 draw.

Yamada faced Sojiro at SHOOT BOXING Hanayashiki Extreme.3 on October 27, 2019. He floored Sojiro with a right cross at the midway point of the opening round.

Yamada faced Kanta Tabuchi at SHOOT BOXING 2020 act.2 on November 28, 2020. The fight was ruled a no-contest at the 1:45 minute mark of the first round, due to an accidental clash of heads.

Yamada faced Takuya Kudo at Shoot Boxing 2021 act.1 on February 7, 2021. He won the fight by a first-round knockout. Yamada's four-streak undefeated streak was snapped by Kakeru at Shoot Boxing 2021 act.2 on April 10, 2021, who beat him by unanimous decision, with scores of 29–28, 29–28 and 28–28.

Yamada faced the third-ranked Shootboxing champion Genki at Shoot Boxing 2021 act.3 on June 20, 2021. He won the fight by unanimous decision, with two scorecards of 30–29 and one scorecard of 29–29.

Yamada rematched Kanta Tabuchi at Shoot Boxing 2021 act.4 on September 4, 2021, having fought to a no-contest with him a year prior. The fight was ruled a draw after the first three rounds of the bout were contested, with all three ringside officials handing in a 28–28 scorecard. Yamada was declared the winner after an extra fourth round, with two of the judges scoring the fight 10–9 in his favor.

Yamada faced the former Shoot Boxing Japan Bantamweight champion Kyo Kawakami at SHOOT BOXING 2021 Young Caesar Cup on December 19, 2021, in what was the former titleholder's debut at featherweight (-57.5 kg). The fight was declared a draw, with all three judges having scored it 29–29. Kawakami was declared the winner by split decision after an extra fourth round was fought.

Yamada faced Aoshi at Shoot Boxing 2022 act.3 on June 26, 2022. He won the fight by majority decision, with scores of 30–29, 30–29 and 29–29. Yamada next faced DEEP KICK featherweight champion Shuto Miyazaki at Shoot Boxing 2022 act.4 on September 17, 2022. He won the fight by a second-round technical knockout.

Yamada took part in the 2022 Shootboxing Young Caesar Cup Dead or Alive tournament, which took place on November 20, 2022. He advanced to the tournament finals with a clear unanimous decision over Hiroki in the semifinals, as every ringside official awarded him all three rounds of the contest. Yamada captured the tournament title with another unanimous decision victory over Keito Naito in the finals, with three scorecards of 30–25 in his favor.

Yamada faced the reigning RISE featherweight champion Keisuke Monguchi in a non-title, Shootboxing rules, bout at RISE WORLD SERIES / SHOOTBOXING-KINGS on December 25, 2022, a Glory, RISE and Shootboxing cross promotional event. He lost the fight by unanimous decision. Despite being able to score a shoot point over Monguchi in the second round, he suffered two knockdowns in the third round.

==== Featherweight champion ====
Yamada challenged Kyo Kawakami for the Shoot Boxing Japan Featherweight title at SHOOT BOXING 2023 act.2 on April 30, 2023. He won the fight by majority decision, with scores of 50–49, 50–49 and 50–50.

Yamada faced Autor Muangphapoon at SHOOT BOXING 2023 act.3 on June 25, 2023. He won the fight by a first-round knockout.

Yamada faced Yodtanong Or.Sansuk at SHOOT BOXING 2023 Series Final on November 14, 2023. He won the fight by unanimous decision, with scores of 30–29, 30–28 and 30–28.

Yamada faced Phetsitong Sor.Saknarin at SHOOT BOXING 2024 act.1 on February 10, 2024. He won the fight by a first-round knockout.

Yamada faced Shogo Kuriaki at Shoot Boxing 2024 act.2 on April 13, 2024. He won the fight by unanimous decision, with scores of 30–28, 29–28 and 30–27.

Yamada was scheduled to face Ryusei at KNOCK OUT 2024 SUPER BOUT BLAZE on June 23, 2024. Yamada withdrew from the bout due to a workplace accident that saw him get multiple fingers partially severed. His left middle finger was partially amputated.

Yamada faced Kazuhito at SHOOT BOXING 2024 act.5 on October 13, 2024. He won the fight by a first-round knockout.

Yamada faced Ngaopayak Adsanpatong at SHOOTBOXING GROUND ZERO TOKYO 2024 on December 26, 2024. He won the fight by unanimous decision.

Yamada faced Ruel Catalan at SHOOT BOXING 2025 act.1 on February 8, 2025. He won the fight by a second-round technical knockout.

Yamada made his first Shoot Boxing Japan Featherweight title defense against Kyo Kawakami at SHOOT BOXING 2025 act.2 on April 12, 2025. He won the fight by majority decision.

Yamada faced Deun Jitmuangnon at SHOOT BOXING 2025 act.4 on August 9, 2025. He won the fight by unanimous decision, with three scorecards of 30—27 in his favor.

== Titles and accomplishments ==
=== Professional ===
- Shootboxing
  - 2022 Shootboxing Young Ceaser Cup Tournament Winner
  - 2023 Shootboxing Japan Featherweight Championship
  - 2025 Shoot Boxing S-Cup Tournament Runner-up

=== Amateur ===
- Shootboxing
  - 2016 Shoot Boxing All Japan -45 kg Championship
    - One successful title defense

== Fight record ==
Professional Kickboxing record
25 Wins (9 (T)KOs), 4 Losses, 1 No Contest
Date	Result	Opponent	Event	Location	Method	Round	Time
2026-08-22	Win	(Thailand) Fahmongkon Joclinic	SHOOT BOXING 2026 act.4	Tokyo, Japan	KO (Left hook to the body)	2	1:04
2026-04-11	Win	(Japan) Kaito Sakaguchi	SHOOT BOXING 2026 act.2	Tokyo, Japan	TKO (Referee stoppage)	3	0:50
2025-11-24	Loss	(Japan) Haruto Yasumoto	SHOOT BOXING 40th Anniversary - S-Cup, Final	Tokyo, Japan	KO (Right cross)	2	2:44
For the 2025 Shoot Boxing S-Cup Tournament title.
2025-11-24	Win	(Thailand) Satanthong Chor.Hapayak	SHOOT BOXING 40th Anniversary - S-Cup, Semifinals	Tokyo, Japan	Decision (Unanimous)	3	3:00
2025-11-24	Win	(France) Josué Absalon	SHOOT BOXING 40th Anniversary - S-Cup, Quarterfinals	Tokyo, Japan	Decision (Unanimous)	3	3:00
2025-08-09	Win	(Thailand) Deun Jitmuangnon	SHOOT BOXING 2025 act.4	Tokyo, Japan	Decision (Unanimous)	3	3:00
2025-04-12	Win	(Japan) Kyo Kawakami	SHOOT BOXING 2025 act.2	Tokyo, Japan	Decision (Majority)	5	3:00
Defends the Shoot Boxing Japan Featherweight title.
2025-02-08	Win	(Philippines) Ruel Catalan	SHOOT BOXING 2025 act.1	Tokyo, Japan	TKO (3 Knockdowns)	2	1:27
2024-12-26	Win	(Thailand) Ngaopayak Adsanpatong	SHOOTBOXING GROUND ZERO TOKYO 2024	Tokyo, Japan	Decision (Unanimous)	3	3:00
2024-10-13	Win	(Japan) Kazuhito	SHOOT BOXING 2024 act.5	Tokyo, Japan	KO (Left hook)	1	1:18
2024-04-13	Win	(Japan) Shogo Kuriaki	Shoot Boxing 2024 act.2	Tokyo, Japan	Decision (Unanimous)	3	3:00
2024-02-10	Win	(Thailand) Phetsithong Sor.Saknarin	Shoot Boxing 2024 act.1	Tokyo, Japan	KO (Left hook to the body)	1	2:49
2023-11-14	Win	(Thailand) Yodtanong Or.Sansuk	SHOOT BOXING 2023 Series Final	Tokyo, Japan	Decision (Unanimous)	3	3:00
2023-06-25	Win	(Thailand) Autor Muangphapoon	SHOOT BOXING 2023 act.3	Tokyo, Japan	KO (Left hook to the body)	1	1:26
2023-04-30	Win	(Japan) Kyo Kawakami	SHOOT BOXING 2023 act.2	Tokyo, Japan	Decision (Majority)	5	3:00
Wins the Shoot Boxing Japan Featherweight title.
2022-12-25	Loss	(Japan) Keisuke Monguchi	RISE WORLD SERIES / SHOOTBOXING-KINGS 2022	Tokyo, Japan	Decision (Unanimous)	3	3:00
2022-11-20	Win	(Japan) Keito Naito	Shoot Boxing 2022 Young Caesar Cup Central #31 "Dead or Alive 05", Final	Kasugai, Aichi, Japan	Decision (Unanimous)	3	3:00
Wins the Shootboxing Young Ceaser Cup Tournament title.
2022-11-20	Win	(Japan) Hiroki	Shoot Boxing 2022 Young Caesar Cup Central #31 "Dead or Alive 05", Semi Final	Kasugai, Aichi, Japan	Decision (Unanimous)	3	3:00
2022-09-17	Win	(Japan) Shuto Miyazaki	Shoot Boxing 2022 act.4	Tokyo, Japan	TKO (Referee stoppage)	2	2:47
2022-06-26	Win	(Japan) Aoshi	Shoot Boxing 2022 act.3	Tokyo, Japan	Decision (Majority)	3	3:00
2022-02-13	Win	(Japan) Kakeru	Shoot Boxing 2022 act.1	Tokyo, Japan	Decision (Unanimous)	3	3:00
2021-12-19	Loss	(Japan) Kyo Kawakami	SHOOT BOXING 2021 Young Caesar Cup	Tokyo, Japan	Ext.R Decision (Split)	4	3:00
2021-09-04	Win	(Japan) Kanta Tabuchi	Shoot Boxing 2021 act.4	Tokyo, Japan	Ext. R. Decision (Majority)	3	3:00
2021-06-20	Win	(Japan) Genki	Shoot Boxing 2021 act.3	Tokyo, Japan	Decision (Majority)	3	3:00
2021-04-10	Loss	(Japan) Kakeru	Shoot Boxing 2021 act.2	Tokyo, Japan	Decision (Majority)	3	3:00
2021-02-07	Win	(Japan) Takuya Kudo	Shoot Boxing 2021 act.1	Tokyo, Japan	KO (Right hook)	1	2:18
2020-11-28	NC	(Japan) Kanta Tabuchi	SHOOT BOXING 2020 act.2	Tokyo, Japan	Doctor stoppage (head clash)	1	1:45
2019-10-27	Win	(Japan) Sojiro	SHOOT BOXING Hanayashiki Extreme.3	Tokyo, Japan	KO (Right cross)	1	1:45
2019-08-24	Win	(Japan) Chihiro Sugiyama	SHOOT BOXING Hanayashiki Extreme.2	Tokyo, Japan	Decision (Majority)	3	3:00
Legend: Win Loss Draw/No contest Notes

=== Amateur record ===
Amateur Kickboxing record
Date	Result	Opponent	Event	Location	Method	Round	Time
2019-06-02	Win	(Japan) Yuuta Matsumoto	KAMINARIMON	Tokyo, Japan	Decision (Unanimous)	2	2:00
2018-12-16	Win	(Japan) Taichi Isogai	Shootboxing 2018 Young Caesar Cup act.5	Tokyo, Japan	TKO	2	1:05
2018-10-14	Win	(Japan) Kyosuke Takarabe	Shootboxing 2018 Young Caesar Cup act.4	Tokyo, Japan	Decision (Unanimous)	3	2:00
2018-08-05	Win	(Japan) Kengo Sasaki	SHOOT BOXING Young Caesar act.3	Tokyo, Japan	Decision (Unanimous)	3	2:00
2018-07-22	Win	(Japan) Satoshi Ogawa	MuayThaiOpen 42	Tokyo, Japan	Decision		
2017-08-06	Win	(Japan) Tatsuya Yamahana	Amateur Shootboxing	Tokyo, Japan	KO		
2017-05-13	Win	(Japan) Hayato Misawa	Amateur Shootboxing, Final	Tokyo, Japan	KO	1	1:25
2017-05-13	Win	(Japan) Ren Ogawa	Amateur Shootboxing, Semi Final	Tokyo, Japan	Decision	2	1:30
2016-12-18	Win	(Japan) Takuto Hashimoto	2016 All Japan Amateur Shootboxing Championship	Tokyo, Japan	Decision (Majority)		
Wins All Japan Shootboxing Junior -45kg title.
2016-10-09	Win	(Japan) Ren Ogawa	Shootboxing All Japan Amateur	Tokyo, Japan			
2014-12-21	Loss	(Japan) Ruka Tagawa	2014 All Japan Amateur Shootboxing Championship	Tokyo, Japan	Decision (Unanimous)	2	2:00
For the All Japan Shootboxing Junior -40kg title.
2013-10-13	Loss	(Japan) Haruto Yasumoto	Amateur Shootboxing	Tokyo, Japan	Decision		
2013-02-10	Win	(Japan) Ryusei Kashiwagi	Amateur Shootboxing	Tokyo, Japan	KO	1	
Legend: Win Loss Draw/No contest Notes

== See also ==
- List of male kickboxers
