= Koyata Yamada =

Japanese kickboxer (born 2003)

- Born: 山田 虎矢太; January 18, 2003 (age 23); Tokyo, Japan
- Height: 165 cm (5 ft 5 in)
- Weight: 57.5 kg (127 lb; 9.05 st)
- Style: Shoot boxing
- Stance: Orthodox
- Fighting out of: Tokyo, Japan
- Team: Caesar Gym

Kickboxing record
- Total: 23
- Wins: 20
- By knockout: 14
- Losses: 3
- By knockout: 2

Other information
- Notable relatives: Kotaro Yamada (twin brother)

Koyata Yamada (Japanese: 山田 虎矢太, Yamada Koyata; born January 18, 2003) is a Japanese kickboxer, currently competing in the super bantamweight divisions of RISE and Shoot boxing. He is the current Shoot Boxing Super Bantamweight (-55kg) champion.

As of January 2022 he was the #10 ranked Super Flyweight kickboxer in the world by Beyond Kickboxing.

== Professional career ==
=== Shootboxing ===
After capturing three All Japan Shootboxing amateur titles, Yamada made his professional kickboxing debut against Kodai Nakada at SHOOT BOXING Hanayashiki Extreme.2 on August 24, 2019, at the age of 16. He won the fight by a first-round knockout. Yamada next faced Shota at SHOOT BOXING Hanayashiki Extreme.3 on October 27, 2019. He once again won by a first-round knockout.

Yamada made an appearance at the fourth iteration of the SHOOT BOXING Hanayashiki Extreme as well, held on December 6, 2020, as he was booked to face Hiroki. He won the fight by unanimous decision, with two scorecards of 30–26 and one scorecard of 30–25.

Yamada faced the fifth-ranked Shootboxing super bantamweight contender Ryota Naito at Shoot Boxing 2021 act.4 on September 4, 2021. He won the fight by unanimous decision, with scores of 30–29, 30–28 and 30–27.

Yamada was expected to face Aoshi at SHOOT BOXING 2021 Young Caesar Cup on December 19, 2021. Aoshi withdrew from the fight due to a rib injury he sustained during sparring and was replaced by Pon Sirilakgym, who stepped in on short-notice. Yamada won the fight by a second-round knockout.

Yamada faced the #1 ranked Shootboxing super bantamweight contender Shinta at SHOOT BOXING 2022 act.2 on April 10, 2022. He won the fight by a second-round knockout, as he floored his opponent with a right hook. Yamada scored a shoot point in the first round with a throw.

Yamada faced the former Shootboxing Japan bantamweight champion Shuto Sato at SHOOT BOXING 2022 act.4 on September 17, 2022. He won the fight by unanimous decision. Two of the judges scored the bout 29–25 in his favor, while the third judge awarded him a 29–26 scorecard. Yamada knocked Sato down with a right hook in the final minute of the opening round and scored a shoot point with a suplex as soon as the action resumed.

=== SHOOTBOXING/RISE ===
Yamada made his RISE debut against the once-defeated Shoa Arii at RISE WORLD SERIES / SHOOTBOXING-KINGS on December 25, 2022. He won the fight by a second-round knockout, stopping Arii with a counter right straight at the 1:21 minute mark of the round.

Yamada faced Seiki Ueyama for the Shoot Boxing Super Bantamweight (-55kg) title at SHOOT BOXING 2023 act.1 on February 12, 2023. He won the fight by a fifth-round knockout. Yamada floored his opponent with a left hook midway through the final round, which left Ueyama unable to rise from the canvas and required him to be carried out in a stretcher.

Yamada faced Tanwalek Looksuan at SHOOT BOXING 2023 act.3 on June 25, 2023. He won the fight by a first-round knockout.

Yamada faced Park Hyunwoo at SHOOT BOXING 2023 act.4 on September 23, 2023. He knocked Hyunwoo out with a left hook 35 seconds into the opening round.

Yamada faced Teppabut ShinkohMuaythai at SHOOT BOXING 2023 Series Final on November 14, 2023. He won the fight by unanimous decision.

Yamada faced Ryunosuke Omori at RISE ELDORADO 2024 on March 17, 2024. He lost the fight by a first-round knockout.

Yamada faced Yuki Morioka at SHOOT BOXING 2024 act.3 on June 15, 2024. He won the fight by a first-round knockout.

== Titles and accomplishments ==
=== Professional ===
- SHOOT BOXING
  - 2023 Shoot Boxing Super Bantamweight (-55kg) Champion

=== Amateur ===
- Shoot Boxing
  - 2012 All Japan Shootboxing Kids Upper-grade Championship
  - 2012 All Japan Shootboxing Kids Upper-grade Tokyo Tournament Runner-up
  - 2014 All Japan Shootboxing Junior -45 kg Championship
  - 2015 All Japan Shootboxing Junior -50 kg Championship
  - 2016 All Japan Shootboxing Junior -50 kg Championship
- MuayThai Open
  - 2017 MuayThai Open -50 kg Championship

Awards

- eFight.jp
  - Fighter of the Month (February 2023)

== Fight record ==
Professional Kickboxing record
20 Wins (14 (T)KO's), 3 Losses, 0 Draw, 0 No Contest
Date	Result	Opponent	Event	Location	Method	Round	Time
2026-10-24		(Thailand) Jomhyun Sinhacha	SHOOT BOXING 2026 act.5	Tokyo, Japan			
2026-04-11	Win	(South Korea) Baek Son Bom	SHOOT BOXING 2026 act.2	Tokyo, Japan	KO (Left hook to the body)	1	1:46
2025-11-24	Loss	(Japan) Haruto Yasumoto	SHOOT BOXING 40th Anniversary - S-Cup, Semifinals	Tokyo, Japan	TKO (2 Knockdowns)	1	2:21
2025-11-24	Win	(Azerbaijan) Mehman Mamedov	SHOOT BOXING 40th Anniversary - S-Cup, Quarterfinals	Tokyo, Japan	KO (Left hook)	1	2:45
2025-08-09	Win	(Thailand) Petchpusong FormedGym	SHOOT BOXING 2025 act.4	Tokyo, Japan	Decision (Unanimous)	3	3:00
2025-06-22	Win	(Japan) Kaito	SHOOT BOXING 2025 act.3	Tokyo, Japan	KO (Right cross)	1	3:00
2025-02-08	Loss	(Japan) Kyo Kawakami	SHOOT BOXING 2025 act.1	Tokyo, Japan	Decision (Unanimous)	3	3:00
2024-12-26	Win	(Thailand) Sitthichai Sor.Dechaphan	SHOOTBOXING GROUND ZERO TOKYO 2024	Tokyo, Japan	TKO (3 Knockdowns)	1	2:33
2024-10-13	Win	(Japan) Ryota Naito	SHOOT BOXING 2024 act.5	Tokyo, Japan	Decision (Unanimous)	3	3:00
2024-06-15	Win	(Japan) Yuki Morioka	SHOOT BOXING 2024 act.3	Tokyo, Japan	KO (Right cross)	1	1:48
2024-03-17	Loss	(Japan) Ryunosuke Omori	RISE ELDORADO 2024	Tokyo, Japan	KO (Spinning back fist)	1	2:16
2023-11-14	Win	(Thailand) Teppabut ShinkohMuaythai	SHOOT BOXING 2023 Series Final	Tokyo, Japan	Decision (Unanimous)	3	3:00
2023-09-23	Win	(South Korea) Park Hyunwoo	SHOOT BOXING 2023 act.4	Tokyo, Japan	KO (Left hook)	1	0:35
2023-06-25	Win	(Thailand) Tanwalek Luksawun	SHOOT BOXING 2023 act.3	Tokyo, Japan	KO (Left hook to the body)	1	1:24
2023-02-12	Win	(Japan) Seiki Ueyama	SHOOT BOXING 2023 act.1	Tokyo, Japan	KO (Left hook)	5	1:49
Wins the Shoot Boxing Super Bantamweight (-55kg) title.
2022-12-25	Win	(Japan) Shoa Arii	RISE WORLD SERIES / SHOOTBOXING-KINGS	Tokyo, Japan	KO (Right cross)	2	1:21
2022-09-17	Win	(Japan) Shuto Sato	SHOOT BOXING 2022 act.4	Tokyo, Japan	Decision (Unanimous)	3	3:00
2022-04-10	Win	(Japan) Shinta	SHOOT BOXING 2022 act.2	Tokyo, Japan	KO (Right hook)	1	2:00
2021-12-19	Win	(Thailand) Pon Sirilakgym	SHOOT BOXING 2021 Young Caesar	Tokyo, Japan	KO (Body punches)	2	2:52
2021-09-04	Win	(Japan) Ryota Naito	Shoot Boxing 2021 act.4	Tokyo, Japan	Decision (Unanimous)	3	3:00
2021-02-07	Win	(Japan) Shohei	Shoot Boxing 2021 act.1	Tokyo, Japan	KO (Punches)	3	2:01
2020-12-06	Win	(Japan) Hiroki	SHOOT BOXING Hanayashiki Extreme.4	Tokyo, Japan	Decision (Unanimous)	3	3:00
2019-10-27	Win	(Japan) Shota	SHOOT BOXING Hanayashiki Extreme.3	Tokyo, Japan	KO (Punches + knees)	1	1:40
2019-08-24	Win	(Japan) Kodai Nakada	SHOOT BOXING Hanayashiki Extreme.2	Tokyo, Japan	KO (3 Knockdowns)	1	1:46
Legend: Win Loss Draw/No contest Notes

=== Amateur record ===
Amateur Kickboxing record
Date	Result	Opponent	Event	Location	Method	Round	Time
2019-06-02	Win	(Japan) Reo Yoshida	KAMINARIMON	Tokyo, Japan	Decision (Unanimous)	2	2:00
2018-11-18	Win	(Japan) Rintaro Yokota	SHOOT BOXING Hanayashiki Extreme.2	Tokyo, Japan	KO (3 Knockdowns)	2	1:18
2018-10-14	Win	(Japan) Juki Sakamoto	SHOOT BOXING Young Caesar act.4	Tokyo, Japan	Decision (Unanimous)	3	2:00
2018-08-05	Win	(Japan) Ryomu Endo	SHOOT BOXING Young Caesar act.3	Tokyo, Japan	Ext.R Decision (Unanimous)	4	2:00
2018-05-13	Win	(Japan) Kenta Hayami	SHOOT BOXING Young Caesar act.2	Tokyo, Japan	TKO	2	1:12
2018-03-11	Win	(Japan) Ryu Hanaoka	Shootboxing Amateur	Tokyo, Japan	Decision (Unanimous)	2	2:00
2017-12-16	Loss	(Japan) Taisei Kondo	Amateur Shootboxing	Tokyo, Japan	Decision		
2017-09-03	Win	(Japan) Ryu Hanaoka	NJKF Explosion 12	Tokyo, Japan	Decision	2	1:30
2017-08-06	Win	(Japan) Suzuki	Amateur Shootboxing	Tokyo, Japan	KO		
2017-07-09	Win	(Japan) Seiya Namai	MuayThai Open 39	Tokyo, Japan	Decision		
Defends MuayThai Open Amateur -50kg title.
2017-05-28	Loss	(Japan) Kyosuke Zaibe	J-NETWORK Amateur Tournament, Final	Tokyo, Japan	Decision (Unanimous)		
2017-05-28	Win	(Japan) Ichie Nakamura	J-NETWORK Amateur Tournament, Semi Final	Tokyo, Japan	Decision (Unanimous)		
2017-05-13	Win	(Japan) Hiromu Abe	Amateur Shootboxing	Tokyo, Japan	KO	1	1:17
2017-05-13	Win	(Japan) Sota Kanai	Amateur Shootboxing	Tokyo, Japan	Decision (Unanimous)	2	3:00
2017-04-02	Win	(Japan) Iori Maeda	MuayThai Open 38	Tokyo, Japan	Decision		
Wins MuayThai Open Amateur -50kg title.
2016-12-18	Win	(Japan) Taisei Kondo	All Japan Amateur Shootboxing Championship	Tokyo, Japan	Decision (Unanimous)		
Wins All Japan Shootboxing Amateur Junior -50kg title.
2016-08-21	Win	(Japan) Hyuga Umemoto	Amateur Shootboxing	Tokyo, Japan	Ext.R TKO		
2016-01-24	Win	(Japan) Ryoga Doi	Amateur Shootboxing	Tokyo, Japan	Decision (Unanimous)		
2015-09-27	Win	(Japan) Raito Tamagawa	All Japan Amateur Shootboxing Championship	Tokyo, Japan			
Wins All Japan Shootboxing Amateur Junior -50kg title.
Legend: Win Loss Draw/No contest Notes

== See also ==
- List of male kickboxers
