= List of kickboxing organizations =

Listing of professional kickboxing organizations

This is a list of notable past and present kickboxing organizations.

== List of promotions ==
Active

- (Russia) Absolute Championship Akhmat (ACA)
- (Romania) Colosseum Tournament
- (Romania) Dynamite Fighting Show (DFS)
- (Netherlands) Enfusion
- (Moldova) Fighting Entertainment Association (FEA)
- (Croatia) Final Fight Championship (FFC)
- (United Kingdom) Glory
- (China) Glory of Heroes (GoH)
- (Romania) Golden Fighter Championship (GFC)
- (Japan) K-1
- (United States) Karate Combat
- (New Zealand) King in the Ring
- (Lithuania) King of Kings (KOK)
- (Japan) Knock Out
- (Japan) Krush
- (China) Kunlun Fight
- (Singapore) ONE Championship
- (United States) Professional Kickboxing Association
- (Romania) Prometheus Fighting Promotion
- (Japan) RISE
- (Japan) Rizin Fighting Federation
- (Hong Kong) World Kickboxing Network (WKN)
- (United Kingdom) World Kickboxing Organisation (WKO)
- (China) Wu Lin Feng
- (Germany) World All Fight System Organization (AFSO)

Defunct

- (United States) Bellator Kickboxing
- (United Arab Emirates) Global Fighting Championship
- (Myanmar) World Lethwei Championship
- (Netherlands) It's Showtime
- (United States) Lion Fight
- (Japan) REBELS
- (United States) Strikeforce
- (Russia) TatNeft Cup
- (Russia) World Version W5

== See also ==
- List of current kickboxing world champions
- List of boxing organisations
