= Sagiv Cohen (musician) =

Israeli musical artist

Sagiv Cohen שגיב כהן
- Born: 1975 (age 49–50); Pardes Hanna-Karkur, Israel
- Occupation: Singer
- Years active: 2001-present

Sagiv Cohen (Hebrew: שגיב כהן; born 20 February 1975) is an Israeli singer, mostly famous as a singer of Mizraḥi (Middle Eastern Jewish) music.

He performed and recorded several times together with Daklon.

== Career ==
Sagiv Cohen was born in Zichron Yaakov and grew up in Pardes Hanna. After completing his military service, he studied at the Rimon School of Jazz and Contemporary Music. During his studies, he began touring with Iris and Ofer Portugali gospel jazz band, which lasted four years.

In 2001, he participated in the Eurovision Song Contest with his own song "Omalala-La," which, although it finished in sixth place, received rave reviews and received extensive radio play. In 2002, Cohen participated in Shimon Parnas Channel 2 show, "Atzal Parnas in the Tavern," as the house singer for an entire season.

In 2016, Cohen released a joint album with Daklon, in which they both performed covers of Ahuva Ozeri's hits. Dudu Tse and Nir Maimon arranged the album's songs, with Ahuba Ozeri accompanying on Bulbul Trang. Their rendition of "Valley of Flowers" was a hit and received radio airplay. That same year, Cohen, along with Ofer Portugali and the Gospel Choir, launched the show "At Li Lila," which featured Zohar Argov best songs in a gospel and blues performance.

In October 2023, she joined the Israeli artists song in memory of those killed, "Am Ahad," which was written by singer Ben Tzur.

== Personal life ==
In 1999, Cohen married for the first time and had two children. In 2010, he remarried and had three more children. He lives in Pardes Hanna.
