= Ryusei Kumagai =

Japanese kickboxer (born 2001)

Ryusei
- Born: 熊谷 龍聖; April 11, 2001 (age 25); Sagamihara, Japan
- Other names: Notorious Tyrant
- Height: 173 cm (5 ft 8 in)
- Weight: 57.5 kg (127 lb; 9.05 st)
- Division: Featherweight; Super Featherweight
- Style: Kickboxing
- Stance: Orthodox
- Fighting out of: Tokyo, Japan
- Team: Team Majestic (2024-present); Wivern (2023-2024); Noppadet Gym (2022-2023); TRY HARD GYM (2014-2022)
- Trainer: Noppadetsorn Chuwattana
- Years active: 2019 - present

Kickboxing record
- Total: 27
- Wins: 25
- By knockout: 15
- Losses: 2

Ryusei Kumagai (Japanese: 熊谷 龍聖, Kumagai Ryusei; born April 11, 2001), better known by his ring name Ryusei, is a Japanese kickboxer. He currently competes in the featherweight division of KNOCK OUT, where he is the current ISKA K-1 Intercontinental Super Featherweight champion and the former KNOCK OUT Black Featherweight champion.

Between August and September 2022, he was the #10 ranked Super Flyweight kickboxer in the world by Combat Press.

== Kickboxing career ==
=== KNOCK OUT ===
==== Early career ====
Ryusei made his professional debut against Naoki Iijima at Suk Wan Kingthong on April 7, 2019. He won the fight by a first-round knockout. Ryusei was next booked to face Shoi at REBELS 62 on August 10, 2019. He won the fight by a first-round knockout.

Ryusei made his debut with KNOCK OUT, the REBELS sister organization, against Miki Urabayashi at KNOCK OUT CHAMPIONSHIP.1 on February 11, 2020. He won the fight by a second-round technical knockout. Ryusei next faced Hiroto Sameshima at Suk Wan Kingthong Rookies on July 19, 2020. He won the fight by a third-round technical knockout.

Ryusei faced Yuki Chiba at REBELS 65 on August 30, 2020. He won the fight by a first-round knockout, after knocking Chiba down three times by the 1:59 minute mark of the opening round. Ryusei was then booked to face KotaroZLS at REBELS 69 on December 6, 2020. He knocked Kotaro out with a head kick, only 51 seconds into the fight.

Ryusei faced Takeru Owaki at KNOCK OUT ～The REBORN～ on March 13, 2021. He won the fight by unanimous decision, the first decision win of his professional career. One judge scored the fight 30–28 in his favor, while the remaining two judges awarded him all three rounds of the bout. Ryusei made his third KNOCK OUT appearance against Ryuta Inoue at KNOCK OUT EX 2021 vol.4 on August 22, 2021. He won the fight by a first-round technical knockout, forcing the referee to step in with a flurry of punches at the 2:00 minute mark.

==== Black Featherweight champion ====
Ryusei's undefeated 8–0 run earned him the chance to fight Ginji for the inaugural KNOCK OUT Black Featherweight title at KNOCK OUT 2021 vol.5 on October 29, 2021. He utilized his height and reach advantage to win the fight by unanimous decision, with all three judges awarding him the first and the second round on their scorecards. Following this victory, eFight named Ryusei their October 2021 "Fighter of the Month".

Ryusei faced Mehdi Jraifi, the first foreign opponent of his career, in a non-title bout at KNOCK OUT 2022 vol.3 on April 17, 2022. The fight was ruled a split decision draw after the first three rounds, with one judge scoring the fight 30–29 for Ryusei, while the remaining two judges scored it as an even 29–29 draw. An extra fourth round was contested, after which Ryusei was awarded the split decision.

Ryusei made his Rizin FF debut against Kaishi at Rizin 37 - Saitama on July 31, 2022. He won the fight by a third-round knockout, stopping Kaishi with a combination of a left hook and a flying knee.

Ryusei faced Yukinori Ogasawara at KNOCK OUT 2022 vol.5 on September 23, 2022. It was Ryusei's first fight following his departure from TRY HARD gym. He stopped his opponent with a knee to the body, after just 66 seconds. Ryusei next faced Gu Taewon at KNOCK OUT 2022 vol.7 on November 19, 2022. He won the fight by a second-round head kick knockout.

Ryusei faced Dawsakorn Mor.Tassanai at INOKI BOM-BA-YE x Ganryujima on December 28, 2022, in a ganryujima rules bout, which was contested in MMA gloves and allowed for throws and chokes. Ryusei won by first round knockout with a left hook to the body only 31 seconds into the bout.

Ryusei was expected to face Yodkitsada Yuthachonburi at KNOCK OUT 2023 SUPER BOUT BLAZE on March 5, 2023. Yodkitsada withdrew on February 8 and was replaced by the Rajadamnern Stadium super bantamweight champion Petchsansab SorJor Tongprajin. The fight was ruled a majority decision draw after the first three rounds, with one judge scoring the bout 30–28 for Ryusei, while the remaining two judges scored it as an even 29–29 draw. Ryusei was awarded a unanimous decision, 10–8 on all three scorecards, after an extra round was contested.

Ryusei faced Qumuxifu in a -59 kg catchweight bout at KNOCK OUT 2023 vol.2 on June 11, 2023. The fight was ruled a unanimous decision draw, following the first three rounds, with three even scorecards of 28–28. Although Ryusei was able to win the second and third rounds 10–9 with all three judges, Qumuxifu was awarded a 10–8 in the opening round, as he was able to knock the champion down with a right hook. Ryusei was declared the winner by unanimous decision, after an extra fourth round was contested.

Ryusei faced Facu Suarez at KNOCK OUT 2023 vol.6 on December 9, 2023. He won the fight by a third-round knockout.

Ryusei was expected to face Kyo Kawakami at KNOCK OUT 2024 vol.1 on February 25, 2023. The bout was postponed for KNOCK OUT 2024 vol.2 on April 27, 2024, as Ryusei withdrew due to illness on February 23. The fight was reschedule for KNOCK OUT 2024 vol.2 on April 27, 2024. Ryusei won the fight by unanimous decision.

Ryusei was scheduled to face Kotaro Yamada at KNOCK OUT 2024 SUPER BOUT BLAZE on June 23, 2024. Yamada was replaced by Taimu Hisai due to injury and the bout was turned into a title fight for the inaugural Super Featherweight belt. Ryusei lost the fight by unanimous decision.

Ryusei vacanted the KNOCK OUT Black Featherweight title on 11 July 2024 in order to move up in weight.

Ryusei faced Braian Gavio for the vacant ISKA K-1 World Super Featherweight title at KNOCK OUT K.O CLIMAX 2024 on December 30, 2024. Ryusei won the fight by unanimous decision.

=== ONE Championship/KNOCK OUT ===
On January 31, 2025, it was announced that Ryusei signed with ONE Championship and he made his debut against Suriyanlek Por.Yenying on March 23, 2025, at ONE 172. He won the fight via unanimous decision.

Ryusei challenged the KNOCK OUT Black Super Featherweight (-60kg) titleholder Taimu Hisai at THE KNOCK OUT on June 22, 2025. He lost the fight by majority decision following an extension round.

Ryusei faced Lom-Isan ReonGym at Kickboxing Fes. GOAT on October 30, 2025. He won the fight by unanimous decision, after knocking his opponent down in the third round.

Ryusei faced Shuhei Kumura at KNOCK OUT 60 on December 30, 2025. He won the fight by a second-round knockout.

== Titles and accomplishments ==
=== Amateur ===
- 2015 Wan Kingthong Real Champion -38 kg Tournament runner-up
- 2017 WINDY Super Fight Kick -51 kg Champion

=== Professional ===
- KNOCK OUT
  - 2021 KNOCK OUT Black Featherweight Championship
  - 2026 KNOCK OUT Black Super Featherweight Championship
  - 2026 KNOCK OUT Red Super Featherweight Champion
- International Sport Kickboxing Association
  - 2024 ISKA K-1 World Super Featherweight (-59 kg) Champion
    - One successful title defense

=== Awards ===
- eFight.jp
  - Fighter of the Month (October 2021)

== Kickboxing record ==
Professional Kickboxing Record
25 Wins (15 (T)KO's), 2 Losses, 0 Draw, 0 No Contest
Date	Result	Opponent	Event	Location	Method	Round	Time
2026-10-25	Win	(Argentina) Rodrigo Bogado	GOAT Kickboxing Fes. 3	Tokyo, Japan	KO (Punches)	1	2:10
Defends the ISKA K-1 World Super Featherweight (-59kg) title.
2026-09-05	Win	(Thailand) Kaewkangwan Torfunfarm	KNOCK OUT.68 ～KNOCKIN' on the WORLD～	Yokohama, Japan	Decision (Majority)	3	3:00
Wins the vacant KNOCK OUT Red Super Featherweight (60kg) title.
2026-06-21	Win	(Japan) Reiya Komori	KNOCK OUT.65 - THE KNOCK OUT 2026	Tokyo, Japan	TKO (3 Knockdowns)	1	2:25
Wins the vacant KNOCK OUT Black Super Featherweight (-60kg) title.
2026-04-18	Win	(Germany) Alen Kalac	KNOCK OUT.63 SPRING FES in Okinawa	Ginowan, Okinawa, Japan	KO (Body kick)	1	1:52
2025-12-30	Win	(Japan) Shuhei Kumura	KNOCK OUT.60 - K.O CLIMAX 2025	Tokyo, Japan	KO (High kick)	2	2:55
2025-10-30	Win	(Thailand) Lom-Isan ReonGym	Kickboxing Fes. GOAT	Tokyo, Japan	Decision (Unanimous)	3	3:00
2025-06-22	Loss	(Japan) Taimu Hisai	THE KNOCK OUT	Tokyo, Japan	Ext.R Decision (Majority)	4	3:00
For the KNOCK OUT Black Super Featherweight (-60kg) title.
2025-03-23	Win	(Thailand) Suriyanlek Por Yenying	ONE 172	Saitama, Japan	Decision (Unanimous)	3	3:00
2024-12-30	Win	(Argentina) Braian Gavio	KNOCK OUT K.O CLIMAX 2024	Yokohama, Japan	Decision (Unanimous)	5	3:00
Wins the vacant ISKA K-1 World Super Featherweight (-59kg) title.
2024-06-23	Loss	(Japan) Taimu Hisai	KNOCK OUT 2024 SUPER BOUT BLAZE	Tokyo, Japan	Decision (Unanimous)	3	3:00
For the inaugural KNOCK OUT Black Super Featherweight (-60kg) title.
2024-04-27	Win	(Japan) Kyo Kawakami	KNOCK OUT 2024 vol.2	Tokyo, Japan	Decision (Unanimous)	3	3:00
2023-12-09	Win	(Argentina) Facu Suarez	KNOCK OUT 2023 vol.6	Tokyo, Japan	KO (Knee to the head)	3	1:06
2023-06-11	Win	(China) Qumuxifu	KNOCK OUT 2023 vol.2	Tokyo, Japan	Ext.R Decision (Unanimous)	4	3:00
2023-03-05	Win	(Thailand) Petchsansaeb Sor.Jor Tongprachin	KNOCK OUT 2023 SUPER BOUT BLAZE	Tokyo, Japan	Ext.R Decision (Unanimous)	4	3:00
2022-11-19	Win	(South Korea) Gu Taewon	KNOCK OUT 2022 vol.7	Tokyo, Japan	KO (Left high kick)	2	0:26
2022-09-23	Win	(Japan) Yukinori Ogasawara	KNOCK OUT 2022 vol.5	Tokyo, Japan	KO (Knee to the body)	1	1:06
2022-07-31	Win	(Japan) Kaishi	Rizin 37 - Saitama	Saitama, Japan	KO (Left body hook + knee)	3	1:23
2022-04-17	Win	(Spain) Mehdi Jraifi	KNOCK OUT 2022 vol.3	Tokyo, Japan	Ext.R Decision (Split)	4	3:00
2021-10-29	Win	(Japan) Ginji	KNOCK OUT 2021 vol.5	Tokyo, Japan	Decision (Unanimous)	3	3:00
Wins the inaugural KNOCK OUT Black Featherweight (-57.5kg) title.
2021-08-22	Win	(Japan) Ryuta Inoue	KNOCK OUT EX 2021 vol.4	Tokyo, Japan	TKO (Ref.Stop./Punches)	1	2:00
2021-03-13	Win	(Japan) Takeru Owaki	KNOCK OUT ～The REBORN～	Tokyo, Japan	Decision (Unanimous)	3	3:00
2020-12-06	Win	(Japan) KotaroZLS	REBELS 69	Tokyo, Japan	KO (Right high kick)	1	0:51
2020-08-30	Win	(Japan) Yuki Chiba	REBELS 65	Tokyo, Japan	KO (3 Knockdowns)	1	1:59
2020-07-19	Win	(Japan) Hiroto Sameshima	Suk Wan Kingthong Rookies	Tokyo, Japan	TKO (Punches)	3	2:23
2020-02-11	Win	(Japan) Miki Urabayashi	KNOCK OUT CHAMPIONSHIP.1	Tokyo, Japan	TKO (High kick + punches)	2	2:54
2019-08-10	Win	(Japan) Shoi	REBELS 62	Tokyo, Japan	KO (Right cross)	2	0:52
2019-04-07	Win	(Japan) Naoki Iijima	Suk Wan Kingthong	Tokyo, Japan	KO	3	
Legend: Win Loss Draw/No contest Notes

=== Amateur record ===
Amateur Kickboxing Record
Date	Result	Opponent	Event	Location	Method	Round	Time
2018-05-13	Win	(Japan) Yuta Takahashi	1st WMC Japan Amateur	Tokyo, Japan	Decision	2	2:00
2017-07-16	Win	(Japan) Hirokazu Urahashi	Muay Thai Super Fight Suk Wan Kingthong vol.8	Tokyo, Japan	Decision	2	2:00
2017-06-04	Win	(Japan) Tomoya Kawashima	Bigbang Amateur 40	Tokyo, Japan	Decision	2	1:30
2017-01-22	Win	(Japan) Yusei Murai	5th WINDY Super Fight	Tokyo, Japan	Decision (Majority)	3	2:00
Wins WINDY Super Fight Kick -51kg title.
2015-08-02	Loss	(Japan) Nadaka Yoshinari	Suk Wan Kingthong Amateur, Tournament Final	Tokyo, Japan	TKO (Referee Stoppage)	2	0:39
For the Suk Wan Kingthong -38kg Real Champion Tournament title.
2015-08-02	Win	(Japan) Eiji Katsura	Suk Wan Kingthong Amateur, Tournament Semi Final	Tokyo, Japan	Decision (Unanimous)	2	1:30
2015-08-02	Win	(Japan) Kaede Hoshino	Suk Wan Kingthong Amateur, Tournament Quarter Final	Tokyo, Japan	Decision (Majority)	2	1:30
2014-06-01	Win	(Japan) Shuto Date	Bigbang Amateur 21	Tokyo, Japan	Decision	2	1:30
2013-08-10	Win	(Japan) Asahi Shinagawa	MAJKF KICK GUTS 2013	Tokyo, Japan	Decision (Unanimous)	2	2:00
2013-06-02	Win	(Japan) Ryuki Yoshida	Bigbang Amateur 14	Tokyo, Japan	KO		
2012-09-23	Loss	(Japan) Tensei Nakajo	MAJKF Kick BREAK-29 -SHARPLY-	Tokyo, Japan	Decision (Unanimous)	3	1:30
For the MA Kick -28kg title.
Legend: Win Loss Draw/No contest Notes

== Custom rules record ==
Professional record breakdown
1 match	1 win	0 losses
By knockout	1	0
By submission	0	0
By decision	0	0

Res.	Record	Opponent	Method	Event	Date	Round	Time	Location	Notes
Win	1–0	Dawsakorn Mor.Tassanai	KO (left hook to the body)	INOKI BOM-BA-YE x Ganryujima	28 December 2022	1	0:31	Tokyo, Japan	Ganryujima rules.

== See also ==
- List of male kickboxers
