= UTMA (kickboxing) =

Lithuanian kickboxing promotion

- Type: Private
- Industry: Kickboxing promotion
- Founded: 2022
- Founder: Viktoras Gecas
- Headquarters: Lithuania
- Key people: Viktoras Gecas (CEO, Founder)
- Owner: Utma grupė, UAB
- Website: uniquetma.com

UTMA, or Unique & Talented Martial Artists, is a Lithuanian-based combat sports promotion that organizes professional kickboxing events in Lithuania.

== History ==
UTMA was established to showcase local and regional kickboxers. It started on smaller venue shows and the promotion has expanded to larger arenas. UTMA frequently promotes events in Kaunas (including shows at Žalgirio Arena).

=== Events ===
UTMA events typically include a mix of professional kickboxing and other combat sports like Muay Thai, mixed martial arts and boxing. The events feature a main event, several co-main bouts, and an undercard showcasing rising talent.

== Current champions ==
Men
Division	Champion	Since	Ref.	Defenses
Kickboxing
86 kg (189.6 lb)	(Lithuania) Dominykas Dirkstys	November 28, 2025		0
81 kg (178.6 lb)	Vacant	July 10, 2026		N/A
75 kg (165.3 lb)	(Serbia) Nikola Cvetkovič	September 27, 2025		1
67 kg (147.7 lb)	(Spain) Khyzer Hayat	September 26, 2026		0
63.5 kg (140.0 lb)	(Lithuania) Modestas Žmuidina	September 26, 2026		0
Muay Thai
67 kg (147.7 lb)	(Lithuania) Vitas Karosas	February 22, 2025		2

== Championship history ==
=== Kickboxing ===
==== UTMA 86 kg Championship ====
Weight limit: 86 kg (189.6 lb)

No.	Name	Event	Date	Reign (total)	Defenses
1	(Lithuania) Dominykas Dirkstys def. Ričards Ozols	UTMA #15; Kaunas, Lithuania	Nov 28, 2025	350 days	

==== UTMA 81 kg Championship ====
Weight limit: 81 kg (178.6 lb)

No.	Name	Event	Date	Reign (total)	Defenses
1	(Lithuania) Mindaugas Narauskas def. Dominykas Dirkstys	UTMA #9; Kaunas, Lithuania	Sep 28, 2024	650 days	
Narauskas vacated the title in July 10, 2026.

==== UTMA 77 kg Championship ====
Weight limit: 77 kg (169.8 lb)

No.	Name	Event	Date	Reign (total)	Defenses
1	(Lithuania) Mantvydas Perednis def. Dovydas Rimkus	UTMA #15; Kaunas, Lithuania	Nov 28, 2025	85 days	
2	(Lithuania) Raimondas Krilavičius def. Mantvydas Perednis	UTMA #17; Kaunas, Lithuania	Feb 21, 2026	179 days	
The division was dissolved in August 19, 2026.

==== UTMA 75 kg Championship ====
Weight limit: 75 kg (165.3 lb)

No.	Name	Event	Date	Reign (total)	Defenses
1	(Lithuania) Raimondas Avlasevičius def. Henrikas Vikšraitis	UTMA #12; Kaunas, Lithuania	Apr 19, 2025	161 days	
2	(Serbia) Nikola Cvetkovič def. Raimondas Avlasevičius	UTMA #13; Kaunas, Lithuania	Sep 27, 2025	412 days	1. def. Nauris Lukošiūnas at UTMA #17 on February 21, 2026

==== UTMA 67 kg Championship ====
Weight limit: 67 kg (147.7 lb)

No.	Name	Event	Date	Reign (total)	Defenses
1	(Spain) Khyzer Hayat def. Martynas Danius	UTMA #19; Kaunas, Lithuania	Sep 26, 2026	48 days	

==== UTMA 63.5 kg Championship ====
Weight limit: 63.5 kg (140.0 lb)

No.	Name	Event	Date	Reign (total)	Defenses
1	(Lithuania) Dovydas Levickis def. Artūras Brižinskas	UTMA #13; Kaunas, Lithuania	Sept 27, 2025	364 days	
2	(Lithuania) Modestas Žmuidina def. Dovydas Levickis	UTMA #19; Kaunas, Lithuania	Sept 26, 2026	48 days	

=== Muay Thai ===
==== UTMA 67 kg Championship ====
Weight limit: 67 kg (147.7 lb)

No.	Name	Event	Date	Reign (total)	Defenses
1	(Lithuania) Vitas Karosas def. Arnas Kalasiūnas	UTMA #10; Kaunas, Lithuania	Nov 8, 2024	735 days	1. def. Arnestas Naujokas at UTMA #11 on Feb 22, 2025; 2. def. Cengizhan Lale at UTMA #18 on Apr 18, 2026

== List of Events ==
#	Event	Date	Venue	Location
25	UTMA #21	November 28, 2026	Žalgiris Arena	Kaunas, Lithuania
24	UTMA Rising #4	November 25, 2026	Akropolis Kaunas	Kaunas, Lithuania
23	UTMA #20	October 24, 2026	Twinsbet Arena	Vilnius, Lithuania
22	UTMA #19	September 26, 2026	Žalgiris Arena	Kaunas, Lithuania
21	UTMA Rising #3	September 23, 2026	Akropolis Kaunas	Kaunas, Lithuania
20	UTMA #18	April 18, 2026	Žalgiris Arena	Kaunas, Lithuania
19	UTMA #17	February 21, 2026	Žalgiris Arena	Kaunas, Lithuania
18	UTMA #16	January 31, 2026	Twinsbet Arena	Vilnius, Lithuania
17	UTMA #15	November 28, 2025	Žalgiris Arena	Kaunas, Lithuania
16	BRAVE CF 99 x UTMA 14	October 18, 2025	Twinsbet Arena	Vilnius, Lithuania
15	UTMA #13	September 27, 2025	Žalgiris Arena	Kaunas, Lithuania
14	UTMA #12	April 19, 2025	Žalgiris Arena	Kaunas, Lithuania
13	UTMA Rising #2	March 28, 2025	Švyturys Arena	Klaipėda, Lithuania
12	UTMA #11	February 22, 2025	Žalgiris Arena	Kaunas, Lithuania
11	UTMA Rising #1	January 17, 2025	Švyturys Arena	Klaipėda, Lithuania
10	UTMA #10	November 8, 2024	Kaunas Sports Hall	Kaunas, Lithuania
9	UTMA #9	September 28, 2024	Žalgiris Arena	Kaunas, Lithuania
8	UTMA #8	April 19, 2024	Kaunas Sports Hall	Kaunas, Lithuania
7	UTMA #7	February 27, 2024	Kaunas Sports Hall	Kaunas, Lithuania
6	UTMA #6	November 10, 2023	Kaunas Sports Hall	Kaunas, Lithuania
5	UTMA #5	September 15, 2023	Kaunas Sports Hall	Kaunas, Lithuania
4	UTMA #4	July 15, 2023	Palanga Arena	Palanga, Lithuania
3	UTMA - Kaunas Prime	April 7, 2023	Kaunas Sports Hall	Kaunas, Lithuania
2	UTMA #2 Winter Edition	December 8, 2022	Kaunas Sports Hall	Kaunas, Lithuania
1	UTMA #1 Special Event	September 15, 2022	VDU Botanical garden	Kaunas, Lithuania

== Notable fighters ==
- (Lithuania) Sergej Maslobojev
