= Akropolis (Kaunas) =

Coordinates: 54.890834°N 23.9173625°E

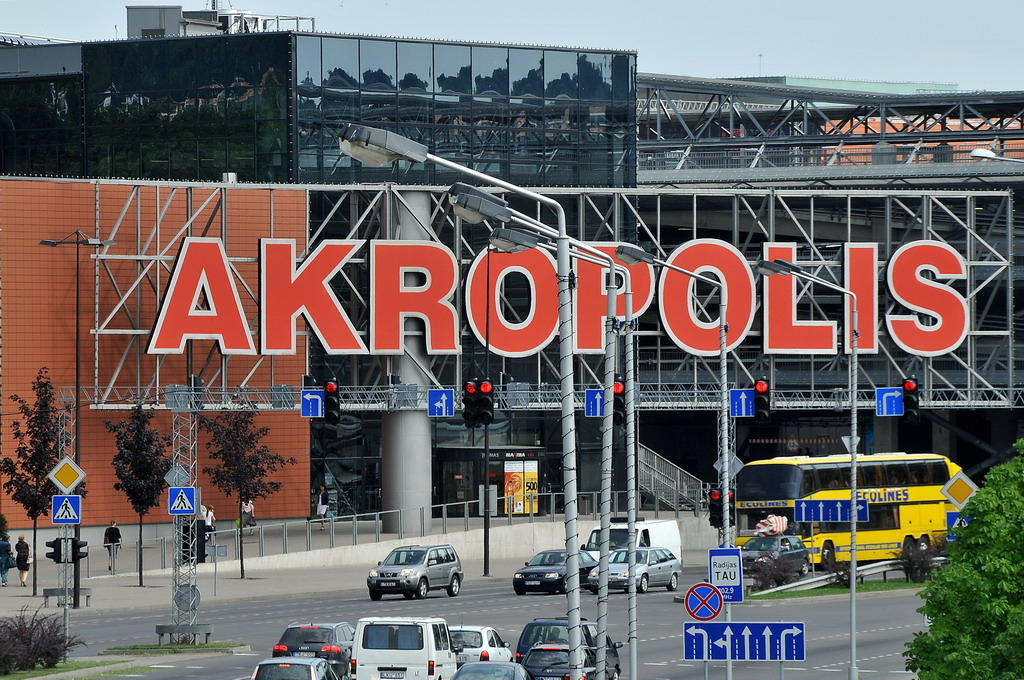
Akropolis exterior

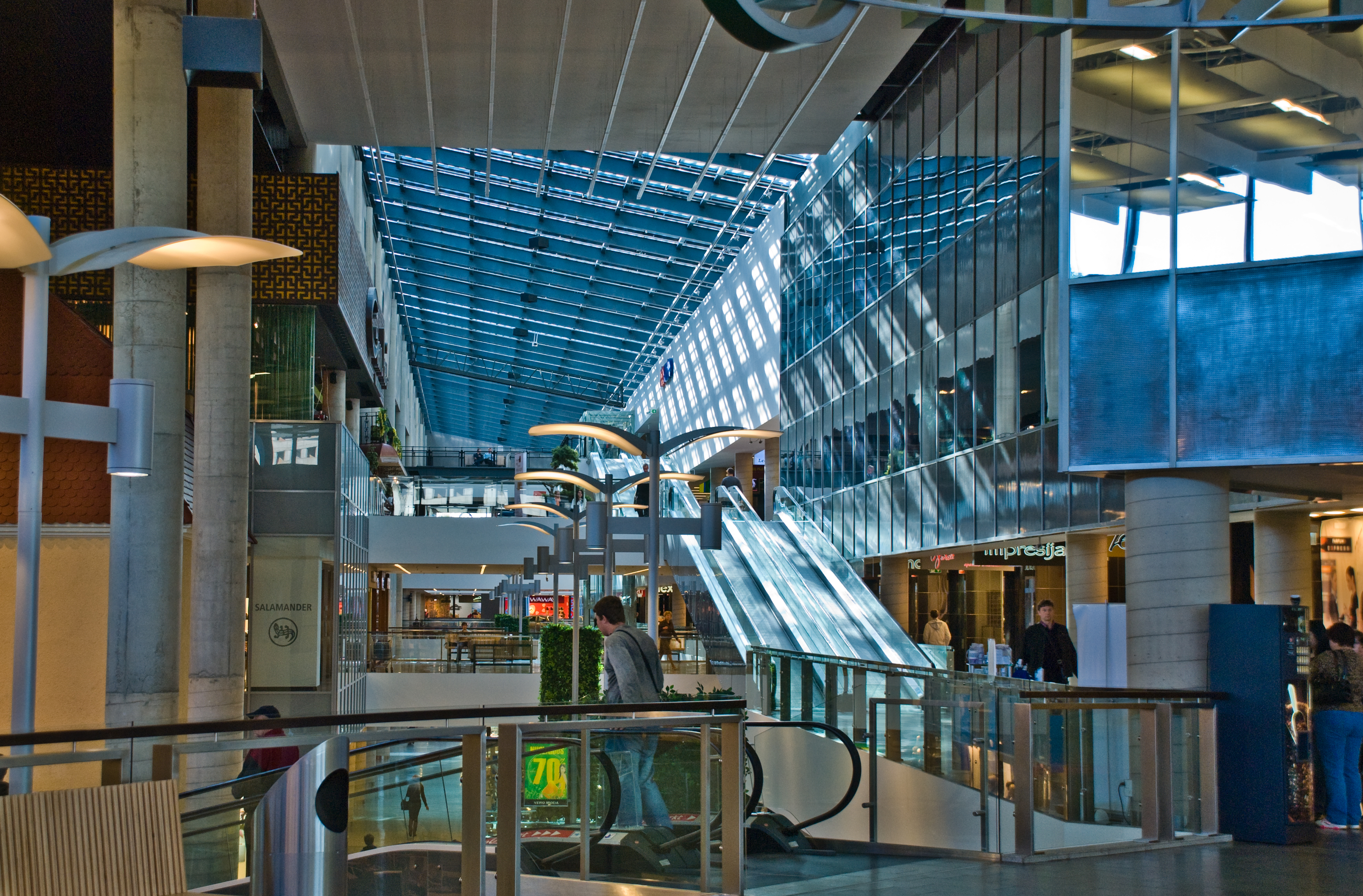
Akropolis interior

Akropolis is one of the largest shopping and entertainment centres in Kaunas, Lithuania.

It is located on the Karaliaus Mindaugo Avenue in Naujamiestis, near the river Nemunas and Žalgirio Arena.

== History ==
The shopping centre was built by the Lithuanian company Akropolis Group in 2007. It was designed by architects Algimantas Kančas and Gediminas Jurevičius. Kauno Akropolis is characterised by its unique architecture – several historical buildings and their fragments (former Kauno Audiniai buildings) have been incorporated into its modern exterior and interior.

In September 2008, the shopping centre was acquired by the German investment company Deka Immobilien GmbH, representing the real estate fund WestInvest InterSelect. Currently, Kauno Akropolis is managed by Newsec Asset & Property.

The reconstruction of Kauno Akropolis, which lasted a year and three months, was completed in the second half of 2019. The renovated area covered 10,360 square metres. The renovation included a major overhaul of part of the shopping complex (third floor), as well as the renovation of the leisure and restaurant area.

== Features ==
The total area of Kauno Akropolis is 80,342 square metres (864,790 sq ft). The shopping centre has 240 shops, cafés, restaurants, services and entertainment venues spread over 4 floors. The multi-storey car park has 2,500 parking spaces.

== See also ==
- List of shopping malls in Lithuania
