= Ben Tzur =

Israeli musical artist

Ben-Zion Haim Tzur בן-ציון חיים צור
- Born: May 13, 1999 (age 27); Safed
- Genre: oriental pop
- Occupations: Singer and songwriter
- Instruments: Guitar and piano
- Years active: 2019–present

Ben-Zion Haim Tzur (Hebrew: בן-ציון חיים צור; known by his stage name Ben Tzur; born May 13, 1999) is an Israeli singer-songwriter.

== Early life and education ==
Tzur was born in Safed, the son of Nissim, of Turkish-Egyptian descent, and Ofra, whose family was originally from Safed. He attended Safed's Multidisciplinary High School. He enlisted in 2018 and served in the army as a storekeeper at the Northern Command Headquarters. He was released in November 2020. He identifies as a traditionalist and a believer.

== Music career ==
His musical career began at an early age, under the influence of his brother Eliad. His performance at the wedding earned him a spot in a competition called "North Star" for young artists, which was broadcast on 104.5FM radio, and he won. After the competition, he set up a recording studio and learned to play the piano and guitar. He also began writing and composing, and the music videos he uploaded online at the time, which included both original material and covers, accumulated around half a million views.

In 2019, he participated in the seventh season of the reality show "The Next Star" with the goal of representing Israel at Eurovision 2020, but he did not make it past the auditions. In 2021, he participated in the reality show "The X Factor for Eurovision." In early 2021, he signed with the production company Alist Music, owned by promoter Matana Yifrach and musician Ofir Cohen.

In early 2021, he signed with the production company Alist Music, owned by promoter Matana Yifrach and musician Ofir Cohen. On May 25, 2021, he released his debut single "You Found Someone", which he wrote and composed himself, and produced alongside Ofir Cohen. On August 16, he released his second single, "Earphone Party", which he wrote and composed alongside Ofir Cohen and Israel Algrabli. On October 4, he released a cover of the song "From the Depths" from Idan Raichel project, which was a success. In February 2022, he released the single "Shbora M'ga'o", which was written and composed by Lidor Sultan, Dror Mizrahi, and Aviv Peretz and produced by Lidor Sultan.

In September 2022, he released a cover of Avi Aborumi single "What's Going on in Your Head", which he produced himself. This cover was very successful, even gaining more views on YouTube than the original performance version. In March 2023, he released the song "Remember Us", a duet with singer Meitar Rubin. The song was written and composed by Ron Biton, Maor Shitrit, and Maitar Rubin, and was produced by Maor Shitrit. In July of that year, he released his debut album, "When the Sun Rises", which contained 11 songs. Ben Tzur participated in the creation of the album songs.

On February 5, 2024, he released the hit single "Abba", which he wrote and composed alongside Ofir Cohen, who also produced the song alongside Shimon Yehya. The song has been covered several times. After the success of this song, Ben Tzur subsequent songs dealt with themes of faith. On June 2, he released the single "Tashlich". On July 22, he released the song "Not Alone", a duet with singer Rotem Cohen. The duet spent a week at the top of the Media Forest Hebrew Chart. On September 3, he released the song "Faith".

On September 25, he released a cover of the song "You Are Beautiful" from Idan Raichel project, which was a success.

On November 28, he released the song "Soly".

On March 4, he released the single "Stories of the Righteous", a duet with Odeya singer-songwriter. The song was included on Odeya mini-album, "All the Melodies Are Over". On April 7, a day before the release of his second album, he released the song "Bat Shel Melech" featuring Yair Elitzur. On April 8, he released his second album, "Everything is Okay", which features eight songs. Ben Tzur participated in the creation of the album's songs.
