= Women's K-1 at WAKO World Championships 2007 Belgrade +70 kg =

Kickboxing tournament

The women's super heavyweight (over 70 kg/154 lbs) K-1 category at the W.A.K.O. World Championships 2007 in Belgrade was the heaviest of the female K-1 tournaments. There were just four women from three continents (Europe, Asia and Africa) taking part in the competition. Each match was three rounds of two minutes each and were fought under K-1 rules.

The tournament winner was Hungarian Zita Zatyko who defeated Moroccan Samira El Haddad in the final to take the gold medal. Defeated semi finalists Russian Albina Vaskeykina and Syrian Azza Attoura received bronze medals.

== Results ==
Semi Finals		Final
(Russia) Albina Vaskeykina
(Hungary) Zita Zatyko	WIN	(Hungary) Zita Zatyko	WIN
(Syria) Azza Attoura		(Morocco) Samira El Haddad
(Morocco) Samira El Haddad	WIN

== See also ==
- List of WAKO Amateur World Championships
- List of WAKO Amateur European Championships
- List of female kickboxers
