= Cindy Perros =

French kickboxer (born 1990)

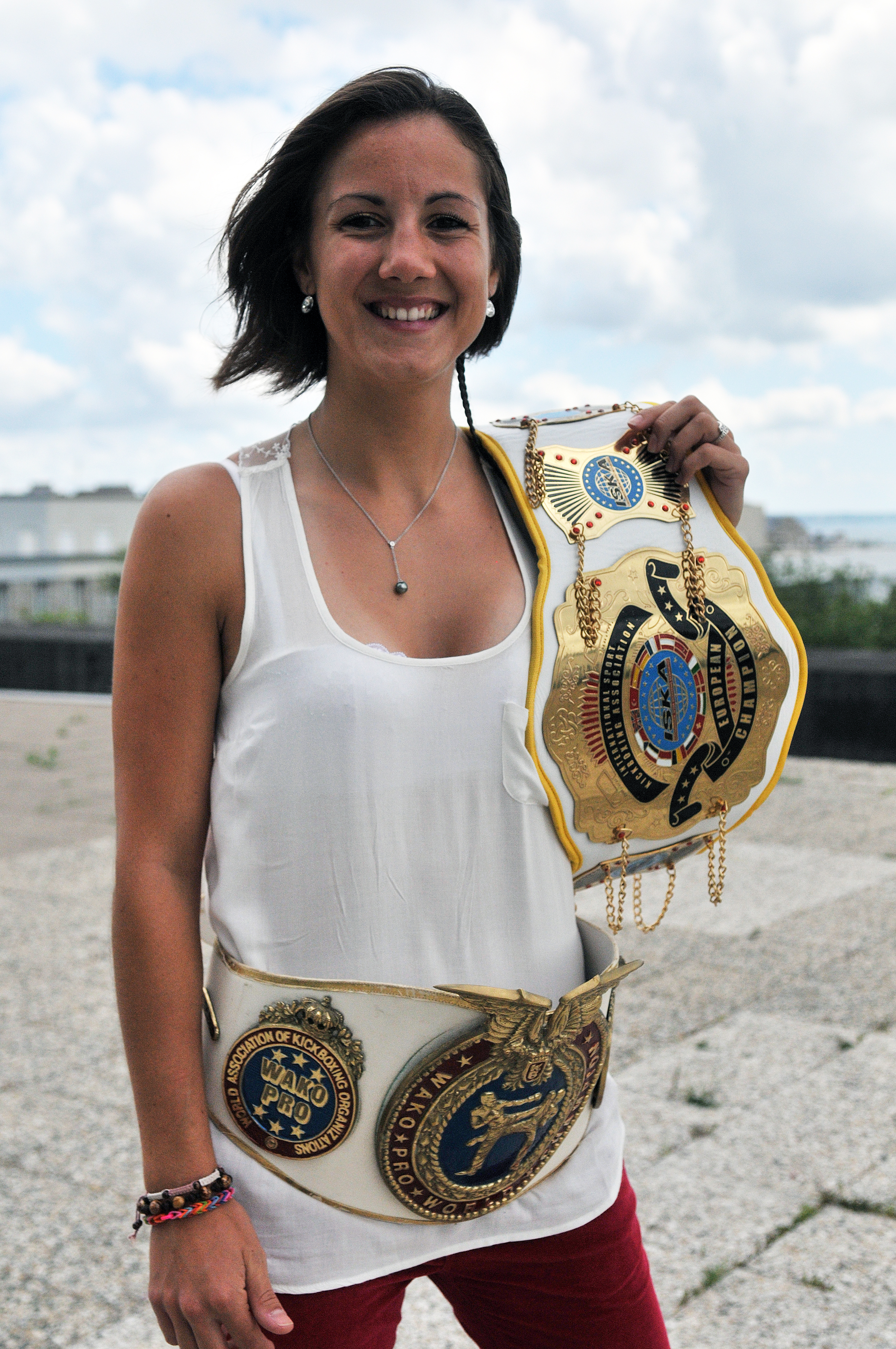
- Perros in 2014
- Born: 7 February 1990 (age 36); France
- Nationality: French
- Height: 1.75 m (5 ft 9 in)
- Weight: 65 kg (143 lb; 10 st 3 lb)
- Division: Lightweight; Super lightweight Light welterweight
- Style: Kickboxing
- Stance: Orthodox
- Fighting out of: Loperhet, France
- Team: Iroise Kick Boxing
- Trainer: Arnaud Charrier

Kickboxing record
- Total: 15
- Wins: 11
- By knockout: 3
- Losses: 4
- By knockout: 0

Cindy Perros (born 7 February 1990) is a French kickboxer and the current ISKA World super lightweight and light welterweight Freestyle kickboxing champion, as well as the former European light welterweight Freestyle champion.

== Kickboxing career ==
Perros faced Johanna Kruse for the vacant ISKA European light welterweight Freestyle at Explosion Fight Night 8 on November 16, 2013. She captured the title by unanimous decision. Perros made her ISKA European title defense against Lisa Schewe at La Nuit des Titans on May 31, 2014. She retained the title by unanimous decision.

Perros challenged Angélique Pitiot for the FFSCDA Light Welterweight (-64.5 kg) title at Choc Des Titans 5 on June 14, 2014. She lost the fight by unanimous decision, moving her score against Pitiot to 0-2, having first lost to her at FK-ONE on April 20, 2013.

Perros bounced back from her second loss by going went on a three fight winning streak. She first beat Laurie Catherin by a fifth-round technical knockout at Ceinture Lahouari Othmane on June 11, 2016. In the second fight of her win streak, Perros won a unanimous decision against Mathilde Contreras at Elite Fight IV on May 13, 2017. Perros extended the win streak to three consecutive fights with a unanimous decision victory over Clara Asensio at Elite Fight V on February 3, 2018.

Perros faced Laurie Catherin in a rematch at Championnat De France Pro K1 Rules / Full Contact / Low Kick on June 5, 2018. She won the fight by unanimous decision. Perros made her first ISKA World Freestyle Kickboxing title defense against Anke Van Gestel at Gal Kickboxing on June 9, 2018. She won the fight by unanimous decision. The pair fought at immediate rematch, with Van Gestel's ISKA World Light Welterweight (-64.5 kg) K-1 title on the line, at Prime Time 9 on November 24, 2018. She lost the fight by unanimous decision.

Perros faced Maurine Atef at Elite Fight VI on January 18, 2019. She won the fight by unanimous decision. Perros faced Alissia Greco for the ISKA World Super Lightweight (-62.5 kg) Freestyle title at K-Fight 4 on June 22, 2019. She won the fight by a third-round technical knockout.

Perros faced Aurore Llorens at Ultimate Fight Night 10 on January 20, 2023. She lost the fight by decision.

== Championships and accomplishments ==
- International Sport Karate Association
  - ISKA European Light Welterweight (-64.5 kg) Freestyle Championship
  - ISKA World Light Welterweight (-64.5 kg) Freestyle Championship
    - Two successful title defenses
  - ISKA World Super Lightweight (-62.5 kg) Freestyle Championship
- Fédération Française de Kick Boxing, Muaythaï et Disciplines Associées
  - FFKMDA National Light Welterweight (-64.5 kg) Championship

== Kickboxing record ==
Kickboxing record
11 Wins (3 (T)KO's), 4 Losses, 0 Draws
Date	Result	Opponent	Event	Location	Method	Round	Time
2023-01-20	Loss	(France) Aurore Llorens	Ultimate Fight Night 10	Brest, France	Decision	3	3:00
2020-01-17	Win	(Italy) Alessia Collochia	Ultimate Fight Night	Brest, France	Decision (Unanimous)	3	3:00
2019-06-22	Win	(Italy) Alissia Greco	K-Fight 4	Sainte-Luce-sur-Loire, France	TKO (Punches and kicks)	3	
Wins the ISKA World Super Lightweight (-62.5 kg) Freestyle title.
2019-01-18	Win	(France) Maurine Atef	Elite Fight VI	Saint-Brieuc, France	Decision (Unanimous)	3	3:00
2018-11-24	Loss	(Belgium) Anke Van Gestel	Prime Time 9	Merchtem, Belgium	Decision (Unanimous)	5	3:00
For the ISKA World Light Welterweight (-64.5 kg) K-1 title.
2018-06-09	Win	(Belgium) Anke Van Gestel	Gal Kickboxing	Quimperlé, France	Decision (Unanimous)	5	3:00
Defends the ISKA World Light Welterweight (-64.5 kg) Freestyle title.
2018-05-06	Win	(France) Laurie Catherin	Championnat De France Pro K1 Rules / Full Contact / Low Kick	Villepinte, France	Decision (Unanimous)	5	3:00
For the FFKMDA K-1 Light Welterweight (-64.5 kg) title.
2018-02-03	Win	(France) Clara Asensio	Elite Fight V	Saint-Brieuc, France	Decision (Unanimous)	3	3:00
2017-05-13	Win	(Portugal) Mathilde Contreras	Elite Fight IV	Ploufragan, France	Decision (Unanimous)	3	3:00
2016-06-11	Win	(France) Laurie Catherin	Ceinture Lahouari Othmane	Quimperlé, France	TKO (Punches)	5	
2014-06-14	Loss	(France) Angélique Pitiot	Choc Des Titans 5	Le Lamentin, France	Decision (Unanimous)	5	3:00
For the FFSCDA Light Welterweight (-64.5 kg) title.
2014-05-31	Win	(Germany) Lisa Schewe	La Nuit des Titans	Saint-André-les-Vergers, France	Decision (Unanimous)	5	3:00
Defends the ISKA European Light Welterweight (-64.5 kg) Freestyle Kickboxing title.
2013-11-16	Win	(Germany) Johanna Kruse	Explosion Fight Night 8	Brest, France	Decision (Unanimous)	5	3:00
Wins the ISKA European Light Welterweight (-64.5 kg) Freestyle Kickboxing title.
2013-04-20	Loss	(France) Angélique Pitiot	FK-ONE	Goussainville, France	Decision (Unanimous)	5	3:00
For the FFSCDA Light Welterweight (-64.5 kg) title.
2013-03-30	Win	(France) Sylvie Declerk	Elite Fight II	Saint-Brieuc, France	TKO (Referee stoppage)	4	
Legend: Win Loss Draw/No contest Notes

== See also ==
- List of female kickboxers
