= Pitiot =

Pitiot is a surname. Notable people with the surname include:

- Angélique Pitiot (born 1978), French kickboxer
- Michael Pitiot (born 1970), French screenwriter and film director
