= Valentina Shevchenko =

Kyrgyz mixed martial artist (born 1988)

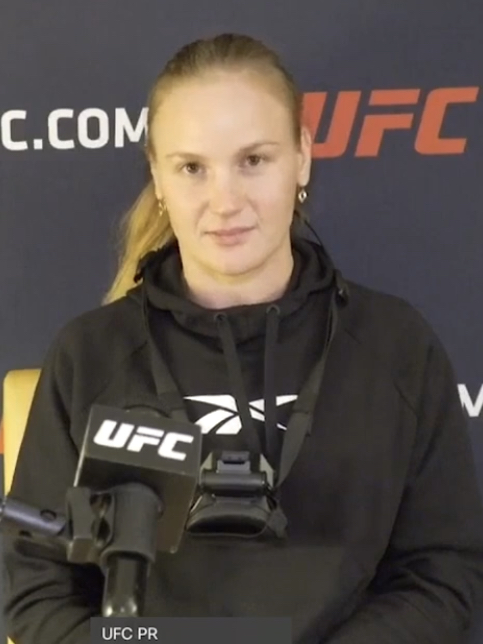
- Shevchenko in 2020
- Born: Valentina Anatolyevna Shevchenko; March 7, 1988 (age 38); Frunze, Kirghiz SSR, Soviet Union
- Native name: Валентина Шевченко
- Other names: Bullet
- Citizenship: Kyrgyzstan; Russia; Peru
- Height: 5 ft 5 in (1.65 m)
- Weight: 125 lb (57 kg; 8.9 st)
- Division: Bantamweight (MMA) (2003–2005, 2010–2018); Flyweight (MMA) (2006, 2018–present); Lightweight (Muay Thai) (2003–2015)
- Reach: 66 1/2 in (169 cm)
- Style: Muay Thai
- Stance: Southpaw
- Fighting out of: Bishkek, Kyrgyzstan
- Team: Tiger Muay Thai
- Trainer: Pavel Fedotov
- Rank: 2nd dan black belt and Master of Sports in Taekwondo; International Master of Sports in Muay Thai; Master of Sports in Boxing; Master of Sports in Kickboxing; Black belt and Master of Sports in Judo
- Years active: 2003–present

Professional boxing record
- Total: 2
- Wins: 2
- By knockout: 1
- Losses: 0

Kickboxing record
- Total: 60
- Wins: 57
- By knockout: 4
- Losses: 3

Mixed martial arts record
- Total: 31
- Wins: 26
- By knockout: 8
- By submission: 7
- By decision: 11
- Losses: 4
- By knockout: 1
- By submission: 1
- By decision: 2
- Draws: 1

Other information
- University: University of Arts Kyrgyzstan
- Notable relatives: Antonina Shevchenko (sister)
- Boxing record from BoxRec
- Mixed martial arts record from Sherdog

Valentina Anatolyevna Shevchenko (Russian: Валентина Анатольевна Шевченко; born March 7, 1988) is a Kyrgyz and Peruvian professional mixed martial artist, former Muay Thai fighter, and kickboxer, with the rare distinction of having won professional championships in all three sports. She currently competes in the women's Flyweight division of the Ultimate Fighting Championship (UFC), where she is the former two-time UFC Women's Flyweight Champion and the first Kyrgyz fighter to win a UFC championship. As of November 17, 2026, she is #2 in the UFC women's pound-for-pound rankings and as of October 3, 2026, she is #1 in the Meta UFC women's flyweight rankings. She is widely regarded as one of the greatest female mixed martial artists of all time.

== Early and personal life ==
Valentina Shevchenko was born on 7 March 1988, in Frunze (modern-day Bishkek) during the period when Kyrgyzstan was a republic within the Soviet Union. Shevchenko was born to a Russian-Ukrainian family of military servicemen, but she has described herself as being ethnically Russian (Note: русская, meaning Russian ethnicity, as opposed to nationality, россиянка) in a Russian interview and her native language is Russian. Her family had Soviet, and later Kyrgyz citizenship. Her mother, Elena Shevchenko, is the president of Kyrgyzstan's national Muay Thai association and a former multiple-time Muay Thai champion. Her father, Anatoly Shevchenko, served in the Pacific Fleet of the Soviet Navy for three years during the Cold War, and played for the Kyrgyzstan national football team.

After becoming interested in combat sports at an early age, Valentina began Taekwondo at age five, under the influence of her older sister Antonina and her mother, who both participated in the sport. At age 12 she branched out into Muay Thai kickboxing and then freestyle Vale Tudo. Her kickboxing career began in 2000 when, also at age 12, she knocked out a 22-year-old opponent, earning her the moniker "Bullet" from her trainer Pavel Fedotov because of her speed in the ring. She traveled to Peru with Fedotov and Antonina in 2007, where they became martial arts teachers, and Fedotov eventually relocated his team there permanently. She later gained Peruvian citizenship and is fluent in Russian, English, and Spanish. She also speaks Thai.

Shevchenko earned an undergraduate degree in Film Directing from the National Academy of Arts of the Kyrgyz Republic. In December 2021, the university awarded her the title of an Honored Professor.

In April 2019, she was awarded by Kyrgyz President Sooronbay Jeenbekov with the Dank Order. She was awarded during her first visit to Kyrgyzstan in seven years, during which Jeenbekov praised Shevchenko's role in her profession, saying that she "defended the honour of our Kyrgyzstan". Valentina and Antonina made UFC history by becoming the first pair of sisters to feature on the same fight card at UFC 255.

== Muay Thai and kickboxing career ==
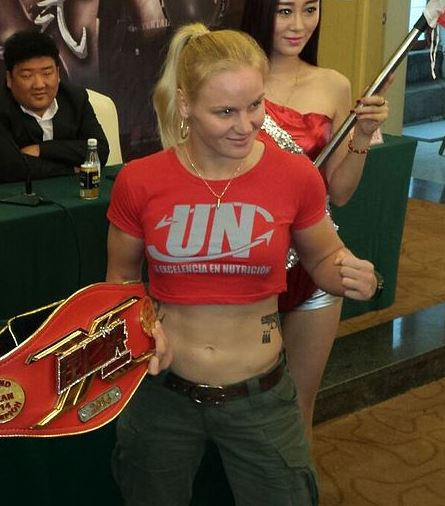
Valentina Shevchenko at Kunlun Fight in China, 2014

From 2003 to 2015, Shevchenko collectively won more than 90 amateur/pro matches in K-1, Muay Thai and kickboxing (eight were won by technical knockout, two by knockout). She received her first loss in kickboxing when she fought Debby Urkens (WFCA) in 2008 and her second one against Cong Wang in 2015. Shevchenko won 8 gold medals (2003, 2006, 2007, 2008, 2009, 2010, 2012, 2014) when she competed in the IFMA world championships, as well as the IMFA Royal World Cup in 2015. During these competitions, Shevchenko defeated future UFC Women's Strawweight Champion Joanna Jędrzejczyk three times and future UFC fighter Lina Länsberg once. Shevchenko is considered to be one of the best female Muay Thai fighters in the world.

== Mixed martial arts career ==
=== Early career ===
Shevchenko made her professional debut in mixed martial arts at the age of 15 on April 21, 2003, at Kyrgiz Federation of Kulatuu against fellow debuting fighter Eliza Aidaralieva. She won the fight via TKO in the second round.

Competing in regional Kyrgiz, Russian and Korean promotions she went undefeated in her next 6 fights, winning all of them via a first-round finish, before deciding to take a hiatus from MMA in 2006 to focus on her Muay Thai and kickboxing career.

She returned to active competition and made her US debut against a future UFC title contender Liz Carmouche on September 30, 2010, at C3 Fights in Concho, Oklahoma. Despite dominating her opponent for the majority of the first round, Shevchenko suffered her first loss after a controversial doctor stoppage due to a large cut caused by an illegal upkick. The referee decided not to call foul, which would result in a disqualification win for Shevchenko, and the fight was instead waved off by the doctor and ruled as a TKO win for Carmouche. After successfully rebounding from her loss in the following year by defeating Akjarkyn Baiturbaeva via unanimous decision and earning the first decision win of her career in the process, Shevchenko took another break from the sport, during which she continued to compete in amateur Muay Thai bouts.

She made her return again in 2013 under the banner of a South American MMA promotion Fusion FC, where she earned two TKO wins with a turnaround of just two months between the fights. With these victories, she improved her professional record to 10–1.

=== Legacy Fighting Championship ===
In 2014, it was announced that Legacy FC had signed Shevchenko for MMA and kickboxing. She faced Jan Finney on February 27, 2015, at Legacy Fighting Championship 39, winning the fight via unanimous decision (30–27, 30–27, and 30–27).

=== Ultimate Fighting Championship ===
Shevchenko made her UFC debut as a short-notice replacement for Germaine de Randamie against Sarah Kaufman at UFC on Fox 17. She won the fight via split decision (28–29, 29–28, and 29–28).

In her second fight for the promotion, Shevchenko faced Amanda Nunes at UFC 196 on March 5, 2016. Although she made an impressive and strong performance in the third round, her slow start in the first two gave the rounds to Nunes. She lost the fight by unanimous decision (29–28, 29–27, and 29–27).

In her third UFC fight, Shevchenko faced former UFC Women's Bantamweight Champion Holly Holm at UFC on Fox: Holm vs. Shevchenko on July 23, 2016. After losing the first round, she rallied back to take over the fight and won a dominant unanimous decision (49–46, 49–46, and 49–46).

Shevchenko faced Julianna Peña in a possible title eliminator match in the main event at UFC on Fox: Shevchenko vs. Peña on January 28, 2017. She won the fight by armbar submission in the second round. The win also earned Shevchenko her first Performance of the Night bonus.

==== UFC Bantamweight title fight ====
Shevchenko was expected to rematch the current women's bantamweight champion Amanda Nunes on July 8, 2017, at UFC 213, but on the day of the fight, Nunes fell ill and pulled out of the fight. The doctors cleared Nunes to fight, but she didn't feel up to it, so the fight was called off. Joanna Jędrzejczyk offered to replace Nunes, but the Nevada State Athletic Commission could not clear her on such short notice.

The rematch against Nunes was rescheduled to UFC 215 on September 9, 2017, in Edmonton, Alberta. After a very close back-and-forth fight, Shevchenko lost the fight via split decision (48–47, 48–47, and 47–48). In the post-fight press conference, she voiced her disagreement with the judges' decision but also said she respected the outcome. Out of 22 media outlets, 10 scored it for Nunes, 10 for Shevchenko, and 2 scored it a draw.

==== Flyweight division ====
In September 2017, Shevchenko revealed plans to join the 125-pound flyweight division.

Shevchenko faced promotional newcomer Priscila Cachoeira on February 3, 2018, at UFC Fight Night 125. She won the fight in an extremely dominant fashion and via rear-naked choke in round two, outstriking her opponent 230–3. This win earned her the Performance of the Night bonus.

Shevchenko was scheduled to face champion Nicco Montaño on September 8, 2018, at UFC 228. However, prior to the weigh-ins for the event, Montano was transported to a hospital due to the effects of weight cutting. The bout was canceled and Montano was stripped of the Women's Flyweight title. UFC officials then announced that Shevchenko would fight for the vacant 125-pound flyweight title later in 2018.

==== UFC Women's Flyweight Championship ====
On September 20, 2018, it was announced that Shevchenko would face Joanna Jędrzejczyk, who was returning to Flyweight, on December 8, 2018, at UFC 231 for the vacant UFC Women's Flyweight Championship. Due to UFC 230 being in need of a main event, Shevchenko was booked against Sijara Eubanks. Eubanks was expected to face Jessica Eye at UFC 232, before being moved to face Shevchenko. After the UFC announced a Heavyweight Championship bout between Daniel Cormier and Derrick Lewis to serve as the main event of UFC 230, UFC confirmed the bout between Shevchenko and Eubanks was canceled and that Shevchenko would return to her original bout at UFC 231 against Jędrzejczyk. Shevchenko defeated Jędrzejczyk by unanimous decision (49–46, 49–46, and 49–46) to become the new UFC Women's Flyweight Champion.

In the first defense of her UFC flyweight title, Shevchenko faced Jessica Eye in the co-main event at UFC 238 on June 8, 2019, She successfully defended her title, winning via a head kick knockout in the second round. This win earned her the Performance of the Night award.

Shevchenko faced Liz Carmouche on August 10, 2019, at UFC Fight Night 156. The pairing met previously under a regional promotion banner in 2010 with Carmouche winning the bout in the second round after the doctor stopped the bout due to a large cut stemming from an upkick. Shevchenko won the rematch via unanimous decision (50–45, 50–45, and 50–45).

Shevchenko defended her Flyweight title for the third time against Katlyn Chookagian on February 8, 2020, at UFC 247. She won the fight via TKO in the third round.

Shevchenko was scheduled to face Joanne Calderwood on June 6, 2020, at UFC 250. However, Shevchenko pulled out of the fight citing a leg injury.

In the fourth defense of her title, Shevchenko faced Jennifer Maia on November 21, 2020, at UFC 255. She won the fight via unanimous decision (49–46, 49–46, and 49–46).

In her fifth title defense, Shevchenko faced former UFC Women's Strawweight champion Jéssica Andrade on April 24, 2021, at UFC 261. After dominating Andrade for most of the bout, Shevchenko won via TKO in round two.

Shevchenko faced Lauren Murphy on September 25, 2021, at UFC 266. She won the fight via technical knockout in round four, defending her title for the sixth time.

Shevchenko faced Taila Santos on June 12, 2022, at UFC 275. She won the close bout via split decision (49–46, 48–47, and 47–48). This fight earned her the Crypto.com "Fan Bonus of the Night" awards paid in bitcoin of US$30,000 for first place.

Shevchenko faced Alexa Grasso on March 4, 2023, at UFC 285. In a surprise upset, she lost the bout and title via a face crank in the fourth round. The defeat marked her first career loss at Flyweight, her first non-decision loss in the UFC and the first time she had been submitted in her MMA career.

Shevchenko faced Alexa Grasso in a rematch for the UFC Women's Flyweight Championship on September 16, 2023, at UFC Fight Night 227. The match ended in a split draw. The decision was controversial as one of the three judges scored 10-8 for Alexa Grasso in the last round, but Valentina argued her dominance in the round relating to the new scoring system in UFC. If the judge would have scored the fifth and final round in Valentina's favor, she would have won the fight and consequently the title.

On February 9, 2024, it was announced that Shevchenko and Grasso would be the coaches for The Ultimate Fighter 32 on ESPN+, which would feature contestants from the middleweight and featherweight divisions. Shevchenko faced Alexa Grasso for the third time on September 14, 2024 at UFC 306. She won by dominant unanimous decision, becoming the only 2-time UFC Women's Flyweight Champion in the process.

Shevchenko defended her title against Manon Fiorot on May 10, 2025 at UFC 315. She won the fight by unanimous decision.

Shevchenko faced former two-time UFC Women's Strawweight Champion Zhang Weili on November 15, 2025 at UFC 322. She won the fight by unanimous decision.

Shevchenko was scheduled to defend her title against Natália Silva on October 3, 2026 at UFC 332. However, Shevchenko withdrew due to an injury that will leave her sidelined for a year, which led to the cancellation of the bout and the title being vacated.

== Professional boxing career ==
Shevchenko made her professional boxing debut on May 8, 2010, at Coliseo Marotta in Callao, Peru against a more experienced Brazilian boxer Halanna dos Santos. She won the fight by unanimous decision. Shevchenko fought from a traditional kickboxing stance and used Muay Thai techniques and grappling tactics multiple times during the match, but wasn't penalized by the referee despite the numerous complaints from her opponent.

The following year, it was announced that Shevchenko will be fighting the boxing champion Melissa Hernandez for her WIBA Lightweight belt. This announcement was met with much criticism from boxing pundits and other boxers alike, as Shevchenko was an unranked fighter with only one professional boxing match on her record at the time of the announcement. After allegedly being threatened to be stripped of her title for refusing to defend it against Shevchenko, Hernandez vacated the belt in November, commenting that Shevchenko fighting for a world title is like "a slap in the face" and that "it's time someone stands up for women's boxing". Lightweight fighter and multiple-time boxing champion Ann Saccurato stepped in to fight Shevchenko for the vacated WIBA title, but the event was eventually canceled.

On December 17, 2011, Shevchenko faced Nerys Rincon at Pueblo Libra Reserclub in Lima, Peru. She won via TKO in the fourth round after sending her opponent to the canvas several times in the third round. Like in her professional debut, she largely fought in a kickboxing stance and frequently used Muay Thai grappling, which Rincon unsuccessfully protested on many occasions during the match.

It was announced that Shevchenko would face a decorated boxer Mary McGee for the vacant WIBA Lightweight championship title on January 14, 2012, in Lima, Peru. However, Shevchenko withdrew from the match for an undisclosed reason later that month and was replaced by Duda Yankovich.

== Fighting style ==
A decorated kickboxer, Shevchenko is primarily known for precise counter-striking and has even been described as a “pure counter-striker”. She is recognized for her exceptional ability to gauge the distance of an opponent's attack, then counter with a wide variety of strikes. In a 2017 interview, Shevchenko noted the challenges of perfecting this technique in mixed martial arts: "It's different to fight a wrestler and stand-up fighter. To feel the distance of her punch, it's different."

After dodging an opponent's strike, Shevchenko will often counter with a fast right hook. She also frequently uses spinning counter-attacks, which are “rarely successful in any combat sport, but something Shevchenko has perfected”, this includes the turning sidekick, spinning wheel kick, and spinning back fist. Shevchenko’s tendency towards spinning attacks was taken advantage of by Alexa Grasso in their 2023 title bout, when the latter was able to get a back mount position and complete a face crank submission, after anticipating a turning back kick. Shevchenko was able to win the title back after subsequent rematches by adopting a grappling-heavy strategy. Throughout her career she has been characterized as being “well-rounded” and as able to execute “an analytical game plan”.

Shevchenko is also a “notoriously stationary” and responsive fighter who prefers to stand, counter, and trade instead of circling the cage. This makes her rare amongst counter-strikers, who often rely on lateral movement or light, bouncing footwork, as seen in fighters like Israel Adesanya or Stephen Thompson. Her planted feet have been attributed to her Muay Thai style and background. She is known for using this footwork along with her ability to gauge and manage distance, to deliver strikes that stop her opponents’ momentum or neutralize their attempts to put pressure on her.

When striking offensively, Shevchenko makes regular use of lead right hooks and two-punch combinations. She also utilizes an outside leg kick, regularly thrown at the end of a flurry or in the early stages of a round. Because she fights in a southpaw stance, Shevchenko often uses the open stance created by facing orthodox fighters to land her lead hook and kicks at outside angles.

In addition to her kickboxing, Shevchenko is also considered by many to be a highly skilled grappler and has a black belt in judo, as demonstrated by her multiple takedowns against Holly Holm, Joanna Jedrzejczyk, Jéssica Andrade, Alexa Grasso, and Zhang Weili (having averaged over five takedowns per fight across seven total MMA bouts against those opponents). She has also submitted Julianna Peña and Priscila Cachoeira via armbar and rear-naked choke respectively. Shevchenko’s versatility in mixing high-level striking with grappling has been called “perhaps her best ability” by journalist Jeff Wagenheim and analyst Dre Waters, who cite her all-time records at flyweight for takedowns landed and control time.

Earlier in her career, she often used her grappling to introduce new threats and disrupt her striking as a supplement to her stand-up fighting. In recent years, however, she has increasingly utilized her grappling as a primary strategy to control opponents. Her distance management and strikes to the body are notable factors in applying this style.

In her Muay Thai career, Shevchenko would often duck under strikes in order to execute a “dump” takedown in the clinch, which has been compared to Saenchai. In MMA she uses this to initiate grappling on the ground.

== Other ventures ==
In 2013, Shevchenko was a contestant on the fourth season of the Peruvian dance and competition reality show Combate broadcast by ATV. She placed first in the competition together with her dance partner, South American reality television star Alejandro “Zumba” Benitez. In one of the episodes, she took part in an exhibition wrestling match against Peruvian professional middleweight boxer David Zegarra, which she won by submission in less than a minute.

In 2015, Shevchenko was elected into the IFMA executive board as a representative of the organization's athletic commission. She was also an ambassador for IFMA's "Sport is Your Gang" initiative in Peru, which offered Muay Thai training to marginalized youth as a way to give them an alternative to joining a gang or participating in a violent lifestyle. The project won the Muaythai Spirit of Sport Award in 2014.

Shevchenko has been regularly competing in the IPSC, IDPA, and 3-Gun pistol shooting competitions since 2010. She began her firearms training in 2006 under the guidance of her coach Pavel Fedotov, a veteran of the Soviet army.

Shevchenko is featured as a playable character in the video games EA Sports UFC 2, EA Sports UFC 3, EA Sports UFC 4, and EA Sports UFC 5.. She is one of two cover athletes for EA Sports UFC 5; the other being mma fighter Alexander Volkanovski.

Shevchenko appears in the 2020 Netflix sports drama Bruised directed by and starring Halle Berry, in which Shevchenko plays the role of Lucia "Lady Killer" Chavez, an Argentinian MMA champion and the main rival of Berry's character, Jackie Justice.

Together with Berry, Shevchenko was featured on the digital cover of the December 2021 issue for Women's Health magazine.

In 2026, Shevchenko made a guest appearance on The Challenge: Cutthroat, the 42nd season of the reality competition series The Challenge, to reveal a twist in the competition called "Trial By Combat".

== Filmography ==
=== Film and television ===
Year	Title	Role	Notes	Ref.
2020	Bruised	Lucia "Lady Killer" Chavez		
2026	The Challenge: Cutthroat	Herself; guest	Episode 10	
2026	The Terminal List	Agent Kira Kotova	Episode 7	

== Championships and accomplishments ==
=== Mixed martial arts ===
- Ultimate Fighting Championship
  - UFC Women's Flyweight Championship (Two times, Current)
    - First Kyrgyzstani UFC champion
    - Nine successful title defenses (Overall)
      - Seven successful title defenses (First reign)
      - Two successful title defenses (Second reign)
    - Most title fight wins in UFC Women's Flyweight division history (11)
      - Tied (Amanda Nunes) for most title fight wins in UFC Women's history (11)
      - Most combined title defenses by a woman in UFC history (9)
      - Most consecutive title defenses in the UFC Women's Flyweight division history (7)
      - Most consecutive single title defenses by a woman in UFC history (7)
      - Tied (Georges St-Pierre) for fourth most combined title defenses in UFC history (9)
    - First woman to defend the UFC Women's Flyweight Championship
    - First and only two-time UFC Women's Flyweight Champion
  - Performance of the Night (Three times) vs. Julianna Peña, Priscila Cachoeira, and Jessica Eye
  - Most wins in UFC Women's Flyweight division history (12)
    - Third most wins in UFC Women's history (15)
  - Tied (Natália Silva) for most consecutive wins in UFC Women's Flyweight division history (9)
  - Tied (Jasmine Jasudavicius, Natália Silva & JJ Aldrich) for second most decision wins in UFC Flyweight division history (9)
  - Most knockout wins in UFC Women's Flyweight division history (4)
  - Tied (Casey O'Neill) for second most finishes in UFC Women's Flyweight division history (5) (behind Gillian Robertson)
  - Most total fight time in UFC Women's Flyweight division history (4:32:47)
    - Second most total fight time in title fights (4:48:22) (behind Jon Jones)
  - Second longest average fight time in UFC Women's Flyweight division history (19:29) (behind Rose Namajunas)
  - Tied (JJ Aldrich & Andrea Lee) for second most bouts in UFC Flyweight division history (14)
  - Most takedowns landed in UFC Women's history (64)
  - Most takedowns landed in UFC Women's Flyweight division history (54)
    - Third most takedowns landed in UFC title fights (52)
  - Most control time in UFC Women's Flyweight division history (1:27:25)
  - Most top position time in UFC Women's Flyweight division history (1:28:32)
    - Fourth highest top position percentage in UFC Women's Flyweight division history (30.6%)
  - Second highest significant strike accuracy in UFC Women's Flyweight division history (54.8%)
  - Fewest strikes absorbed per minute in UFC Women's Flyweight division history (1.81)
  - Fourth most significant strikes landed in UFC Women's Flyweight division history (868)
    - Most total strikes landed in UFC Women's Flyweight division history (2100)
  - Second highest takedown accuracy percentage in UFC Women's Flyweight division history (64.3%)
  - Fifth highest significant strike defense percentage in UFC Women's Flyweight division history (65.9)
  - Fifth highest takedown defense percentage in UFC Women's Flyweight division history (78.1)
  - Holds wins over six former UFC champions — vs. Holly Holm, Julianna Peña, Joanna Jędrzejczyk, Jéssica Andrade, Alexa Grasso and Zhang Weili
  - UFC Honors Awards
    - 2019: Fan's Choice Knockout of the Year Nominee vs. Jessica Eye
  - UFC.com Awards
    - 2016: Ranked #10 Upset of the Year vs. Holly Holm
    - 2017: Ranked #5 Submission of the Year vs. Julianna Peña
    - 2018: Ranked #5 Fighter of the Year
    - 2019: Top 10 Fighter of the Year & Ranked #2 Knockout of the Year vs. Jessica Eye
    - 2020: Ranked #6 Fighter of the Year
    - 2023: Ranked #9 Fight of the Year vs. Alexa Grasso 1 & Ranked #10 Fight of the Year vs. Alexa Grasso 2
    - 2025: Ranked #5 Fighter of the Year (Tied with Jiří Procházka)
- The Athletic
  - 2010s Women's Flyweight Fighter of the Decade
- Bloody Elbow
  - 2010s Women's Flyweight Fighter of the Decade
- MMA Junkie
  - 2015 Under-the-Radar Fighter of the Year
  - 2019 June Knockout of the Month vs. Jessica Eye
  - 2025 Female Fighter of the Year
- Combat Press
  - 2020 Female Fighter of the Year
  - 2025 Female Fighter of the Year
- Cageside Press
  - 2020 Female Fighter of the Year
  - 2025 Female Fighter of the Year
- BT Sport
  - 2020 Female Fighter of the Year
  - 2021 Female Fighter of the Year
- Daily Mirror
  - 2021 Female Fighter of the Year
- World MMA Awards
  - 2022 Female Fighter of the Year
- Fight Matrix
  - 2019 Female Fighter of the Year tied with Amanda Nunes
  - 2020 Female Fighter of the Year
  - 2021 Female Fighter of the Year
  - 2025 Female Fighter of the Year
- Sherdog
  - 2025 Female Fighter of the Year
- ESPN
  - 2020 Female Fighter of the Year
  - 2025 Women's Fighter of the Year
- The Wrightway Sports Network
  - 2025 Female Fighter of the Year
- theScore
  - 2025 Female Fighter of the Year
- MMA Mania
  - 2025 #2 Ranked Fighter of the Year
- MMA Fighting
  - 2025 #2 Ranked Fighter of the Year
  - 2025 Third Team MMA All-Star
- CBS Sports
  - 2019 #3 Ranked UFC Knockout of the Year vs. Jessica Eye
- Uncrowned
  - 2025 Women's Fighter of the Year
- LowKick MMA
  - 2025 Female Fighter of the Year

=== Kickboxing ===
- Kunlun Fight Women's Lightweight Championship (1 title defense)
- 2014 Kunlun Fight Female -60kg Tournament Champion
- 2013 World K-1 Champion WKC, Peru (60 kg)
- 2013 World K-1 Champion WKC, Mexico (60 kg)
- 2005 World Champion KF-1 MMA Pro, Korea, Seoul (57 kg)
- 2004 World Kickboxing Champion WAKO, Italy (56 kg)
- 2003 World Champion KF-1 MMA Pro, Korea, Seoul (55 kg)
- 2003 World Kickboxing Championship WAKO Bronze Medal, France (56 kg)
- 2003 Asia Cup Champion (55 kg)
- 2002 Kyrgyzstan National Champion (55 kg)

=== Judo ===
- 2002 Kyrgyzstan National Champion (58 kg)

=== Boxing ===
- 2007 Russian Women's National Amateur Champion (57 kg)

=== Taekwondo ===
- 2005 ITF and WTF European Championship, Gold Medal (58 kg)
- 2005 ITF and WTF European Championship Team Pattern, Gold Medal
- 2003 ITF World Championship, Bronze Medal (58 kg)
- 2002 ITF Asian Championship, Gold Medal (58 kg)

=== Muay Thai ===
- 2015 I.F.M.A. Royal World Cup Tournament Championship (60 kg)
- 2014 I.F.M.A. World Championship (60 kg)
- 2013 World Combat Games, Muay Thai Gold Medalist (60 kg)
- 2012 WMC Muaythai Female Super Lightweight World Champion
- 2012 I.F.M.A. World Championship (60 kg)
- 2011 I.F.M.A. World Championship, Silver Medal (60 kg)
- 2011 WMC-I.F.M.A. South American Championship (63.5 kg)
- 2010 I.F.M.A. Panamerican Championship (60 kg)
- 2010 World Combat Games, Muay Thai Gold Medalist (60 kg)
- 2010 I.F.M.A. World Championship (63.5 kg)
- 2009 I.F.M.A. World Championship (60 kg)
- 2008 I.F.M.A. World Championship (57 kg)
- 2008 R.M.F. Russian National Championship (57 kg)
- 2007 I.F.M.A. World Championship (57 kg)
- 2007 R.M.F. Russian National Championship (57 kg)
- 2006 I.F.M.A. World Championship (57 kg)
- 2006 World Muay Thai WMF Champion, Thailand (57 kg)
- 2003 I.F.M.A. World Championship (57 kg)

== Mixed martial arts record ==
Professional record breakdown
31 matches	26 wins	4 losses
By knockout	8	1
By submission	7	1
By decision	11	2
Draws	1	

Res.	Record	Opponent	Method	Event	Date	Round	Time	Location	Notes
Win	26–4–1	Zhang Weili	Decision (unanimous)	UFC 322	November 15, 2025	5	5:00	New York City, New York, United States	Defended the UFC Women's Flyweight Championship. Later vacated the title due to injury on October 3, 2026.
Win	25–4–1	Manon Fiorot	Decision (unanimous)	UFC 315	May 10, 2025	5	5:00	Montreal, Quebec, Canada	Defended the UFC Women's Flyweight Championship.
Win	24–4–1	Alexa Grasso	Decision (unanimous)	UFC 306	September 14, 2024	5	5:00	Las Vegas, Nevada, United States	Won the UFC Women's Flyweight Championship.
Draw	23–4–1	Alexa Grasso	Draw (split)	UFC Fight Night: Grasso vs. Shevchenko 2	September 16, 2023	5	5:00	Las Vegas, Nevada, United States	For the UFC Women's Flyweight Championship.
Loss	23–4	Alexa Grasso	Submission (face crank)	UFC 285	March 4, 2023	4	4:34	Las Vegas, Nevada, United States	Lost the UFC Women's Flyweight Championship.
Win	23–3	Taila Santos	Decision (split)	UFC 275	June 12, 2022	5	5:00	Kallang, Singapore	Defended the UFC Women's Flyweight Championship.
Win	22–3	Lauren Murphy	TKO (elbows and punches)	UFC 266	September 25, 2021	4	4:00	Las Vegas, Nevada, United States	Defended the UFC Women's Flyweight Championship.
Win	21–3	Jéssica Andrade	TKO (elbows)	UFC 261	April 24, 2021	2	3:19	Jacksonville, Florida, United States	Defended the UFC Women's Flyweight Championship.
Win	20–3	Jennifer Maia	Decision (unanimous)	UFC 255	November 21, 2020	5	5:00	Las Vegas, Nevada, United States	Defended the UFC Women's Flyweight Championship.
Win	19–3	Katlyn Chookagian	TKO (elbows and punches)	UFC 247	February 8, 2020	3	1:03	Houston, Texas, United States	Defended the UFC Women's Flyweight Championship.
Win	18–3	Liz Carmouche	Decision (unanimous)	UFC Fight Night: Shevchenko vs. Carmouche 2	August 10, 2019	5	5:00	Montevideo, Uruguay	Defended the UFC Women's Flyweight Championship.
Win	17–3	Jessica Eye	KO (head kick)	UFC 238	June 8, 2019	2	0:26	Chicago, Illinois, United States	Defended the UFC Women's Flyweight Championship. Performance of the Night.
Win	16–3	Joanna Jędrzejczyk	Decision (unanimous)	UFC 231	December 8, 2018	5	5:00	Toronto, Ontario, Canada	Won the vacant UFC Women's Flyweight Championship.
Win	15–3	Priscila Cachoeira	Submission (rear-naked choke)	UFC Fight Night: Machida vs. Anders	February 3, 2018	2	4:25	Belém, Brazil	Return to Flyweight. Performance of the Night.
Loss	14–3	Amanda Nunes	Decision (split)	UFC 215	September 9, 2017	5	5:00	Edmonton, Alberta, Canada	For the UFC Women's Bantamweight Championship.
Win	14–2	Julianna Peña	Submission (armbar)	UFC on Fox: Shevchenko vs. Peña	January 28, 2017	2	4:29	Denver, Colorado, United States	Performance of the Night.
Win	13–2	Holly Holm	Decision (unanimous)	UFC on Fox: Holm vs. Shevchenko	July 23, 2016	5	5:00	Chicago, Illinois, United States	
Loss	12–2	Amanda Nunes	Decision (unanimous)	UFC 196	March 5, 2016	3	5:00	Las Vegas, Nevada, United States	
Win	12–1	Sarah Kaufman	Decision (split)	UFC on Fox: dos Anjos vs. Cowboy 2	December 19, 2015	3	5:00	Orlando, Florida, United States	
Win	11–1	Jan Finney	Decision (unanimous)	Legacy FC 39	February 27, 2015	3	5:00	Houston, Texas, United States	
Win	10–1	Hellen Bastos	TKO (doctor stoppage)	Fusion FC 6	February 26, 2014	2	3:00	Lima, Peru	
Win	9–1	Priscila Orellana	TKO (punches)	Fusion FC 5	December 18, 2013	1	0:50	Lima, Peru	
Win	8–1	Akjarkyn Baiturbaeva	Decision (unanimous)	KF-1: MMA World Competition	April 30, 2011	3	5:00	Seoul, South Korea	
Loss	7–1	Liz Carmouche	TKO (doctor stoppage)	C3 Fights: Red River Rivalry	September 30, 2010	2	3:00	Concho, Oklahoma, United States	Return to Bantamweight.
Win	7–0	Yulia Nemtsova	Submission (ezekiel choke)	Professional Free Fight	March 3, 2006	1	1:11	Krasnodar, Russia	Flyweight debut.
Win	6–0	Kim Kyung-aeh	Submission (armbar)	WXF: X-Impact World Championships 2005	July 9, 2005	1	1:09	Seoul, South Korea	
Win	5–0	Roza Kalieva	Submission (rear-naked choke)	Kazakhstan Federation of Pankration 2	March 22, 2005	1	1:09	Kokshetau, Kazakhstan	
Win	4–0	Alla Iskarenova	Submission (rear-naked choke)	Kazakhstan Federation of Pankration 1	March 21, 2005	1	1:12	Kokshetau, Kazakhstan	
Win	3–0	Erkesh Kokoeva	TKO (punches)	Kyrgyz Federation of Kulatuu 2	October 15, 2004	1	N/A	Kyrgyzstan	
Win	2–0	Kim Mi-choi	Submission (rear-naked choke)	WXF: X-Impact World Championships 2003	December 9, 2003	1	1:55	Seoul, South Korea	
Win	1–0	Eliza Aidaralieva	TKO (punches)	Kyrgyz Federation of Kulatuu 1	April 21, 2003	2	N/A	Kyrgyzstan	Bantamweight debut.

== Pay-per-view bouts ==
No.	Event	Fight	Date	Venue	City	PPV Buys
1.	UFC 215	Nunes vs. Shevchenko 2	September 9, 2017	Rogers Place	Edmonton, Alberta, Canada	100,000

== Professional boxing record ==
2 fights	2 wins	0 losses
By knockout	1	0
By decision	1	0

No.	Result	Record	Opponent	Type	Round, time	Date	Location	Notes
2	Win	2–0	Nerys Rincon	RTD	4 (10)	17 Dec 2011	Coliseo ReserClub de Pueblo Libre, Lima, Peru	
1	Win	1–0	Halanna Dos Santos	UD	10	8 May 2010	Coliseo Marotta, Callao, Peru	

== Kickboxing and Muay Thai record ==
Professional Kickboxing and Muay Thai record
Date	Result	Opponent	Event	Location	Method	Round	Time
2015-10-31	Loss	(China) Cong Wang	Kunlun Fight 33	Changde, China	Decision (Unanimous)	3	3:00
Loses the Kunlun Fight Women's Lightweight Championship -60 kg.
2015-07-24	Win	(Belgium) Anke Van Gestel	Legacy Kickboxing 3	Houston, Texas, United States	Decision (Unanimous)	5	3:00
2015-01-16	Win	(United States) Lindsay Haycraft	Legacy Kickboxing 1	Houston, Texas, United States	Decision (Unanimous)	5	3:00
2014-10-05	Win	(France) Chali Bassinah	Kunlun Fight 11	Macau, China	Decision (Unanimous)	3	3:00
Retains the Kunlun Fight Women's Lightweight Championship -60 kg.
2014-08-31	Win	(Russia) Irina Mazepa	Kunlun Fight 9 - 2014 Legend of Mulan Tournament, Final	Shangqiu, China	KO (High kick)	1	2:59
Wins the Kunlun Fight Women's Lightweight Championship and the Kunlun Fight 2014 Female -60kg Tournament.
2014-08-31	Win	(China) Yang Yang	Kunlun Fight 9 - 2014 Legend of Mulan Tournament, Semi-finals	Shangqiu, China	Decision (Unanimous)	3	3:00
2014-08-31	Win	(Italy) Elisa Qualizza	Kunlun Fight 9 - 2014 Legend of Mulan Tournament, Quarter Finals	Shangqiu, China	Decision (Unanimous)	3	3:00
2013-12-1	Win	(Argentina) Maria Ruso	WKL Championship	Cordoba, Argentina	Decision (Unanimous)	5	2:00
2013-06-22	Win	(Paraguay) Fabiana Dutra	South American Muay Thai Championship	Asunción, Paraguay	TKO (Spinning back kick to the body)	1	1:31
2013-03-02	Win	(Mexico) Malena Muñoz	WKC K-1 World Championships 2013	Lima, Peru	TKO (Spinning back kick to the body)	1	2:30
Retains the WKC K-1 Lightweight World Championship -60 kg
2013-01-06	Win	(Mexico) Tania Gonzales	WKC K-1 World Championships 2013	Mexico	Decision (Unanimous)	3	3:00
Wins the WKC K-1 Lightweight World Championship -60 kg
2012-12-02	Win	(Brazil) Patricia Silva	Super Luta Feminina	Porto Alegre, Brazil	Decision (Unanimous)	4	3:00
2012-08-24	Win	(Argentina) Laura Soledad Griffa	Titulo Mondial de Kickboxing	Lima, Peru	Decision (Unanimous)	4	3:00
2012-04-28	Win	(France) Stephanie Ielö Page	Double championnat du monde WMC	Brest, France	Decision (Unanimous)	5	3:00
Wins the WMC Muaythai Female Super Lightweight World Champion.
2011-11-06	Win	(Netherlands) Ilona Wijmans	Muaythai Premier League: Third Round Netherlands	The Hague, Netherlands	Decision (Unanimous)	5	3:00
2011-09-02	Win	(France) Angélique Pitiot	Muaythai Premier League: First Round California	Long Beach, California, USA	Decision (Split)	5	3:00
2011-05-16	Win	(Argentina) Ruth Stephanie Aquino	South American Muay Thai Championship	Buenos Aires, Argentina	Decision (Unanimous)	3	2:00
Wins the WMC-I.F.M.A. South American Muay Thai Championship -63.5 kg.
2011-02-09	Win	(Czech Republic) Martina Jindrová	Bangla Boxing Stadium	Phuket, Thailand	Decision (Unanimous)	5	2:00
2010-12-14	Win	(Denmark) Carla Nadu	Andaman Coast Muay Thai Championship	Phuket, Thailand	Decision	5	2:00
2010-10-04	Win	(Brazil) Tainara Lisboa	INKA Fight Championship	Lima, Peru	Decision (Unanimous)	4	2:00
2010-02-9	Win	(China) Ning Le	K-1 event in China	China	TKO (Knee and punches)	1	1:19
2010-01-29	Win	(Thailand) Nombum Honchenjin	N/A	Phuket, Thailand	TKO (Corner stoppage)	4	2:00
2010-01-14	Win	(Sweden) Madeleine Vall	Andaman Coast Muay Thai Championship	Phuket, Thailand	Decision	4	2:00
2010-01-13	Win	(United Kingdom) Geraldine O'Callaghan	N/A	Thailand	Decision	4	N/A
2010-01-3	Loss	(China) Bai Ling	Wu Lin Feng: China vs. Africa	Zhangzhou, China	Technical Decision (Unanimous)	4	N/A
2009-10-02	Win	(Brazil) Mahalia Rocha de Morais	Martial Arts Festival XVIII	Lima, Peru	TKO (Punches)	N/A	N/A
2008-05-03	Win	(Netherlands) Chajmaa Bellekhal	Next Generation Warriors	Utrecht, Netherlands	Decision	5	3:00
2008-04-19	Loss	(Belgium) Debby Urkens	Temple of Thaiboxing	Bladel, Netherlands	Decision	5	3:00
2008-01-29	Win	(Thailand) Sumwan Thorat	Andaman Coast Muay Thai Championship	Ko Samui, Thailand	KO (Elbow)	4	1:56
2005-10-?	Win	(Russia) Yulia Yelskaya	Russian Muay Thai Championship	Nizhny Novgorod, Russia	Decision	4	N/A
2005-04-?	Win	(Russia) Irina Yakhno	N/A	Krasnodar, Russia	TKO (Corner stoppage)	4	2:00
2005-?-?	Win	(Belarus) Maria Ostapchuk	N/A	Krasnodar, Russia	TKO	5	N/A
2005-?-?	Win	(France) Ingrid Graziani	Russia vs. France	Krasnodar, Russia	KO (Punch)	1	1:24
2004-08-?	Win	(Kazakhstan) Ekaterina Azadova	Asian Open Junior Kickboxing Championship	Bishkek, Kyrgyzstan	Decision (Unanimous)	3	N/A
2004-03-10	Win	(Latvia) Oksana Chernikova	BARS: Female Fights	Moscow, Russia	N/A	N/A	N/A
2004-?-?	Win	(Russia) Svetlana Kulakova	N/A	Bishkek, Kyrgyzstan	Decision	3	2:00
2003-?-?	Win	(Kazakhstan) Gulzara Azizova	Asian Cup Kickboxing Final	Bishkek, Kyrgyzstan	Decision	6	2:00
Wins the Asia Cup -55 kg.
2003-02-?	Win	(Lebanon) Tina Zakarian	Kickboxing: Kyrgyzstan vs. Lebanon	Muscat, Oman	Decision	3	2:00

Amateur Kickboxing and Muay Thai record (Incomplete)
(Muay Thai) 55 wins, 1 losses, 0 draws
Date	Result	Opponent	Event	Location	Method	Round	Time
2015-08-23	Win	(Belarus) Mariya Valent	I.F.M.A. Royal World cup Tournament 2015, Finals -60 kg	Bangkok, Thailand	Decision	3	3:00
Wins the I.F.M.A. Royal World cup Tournament Gold Medal -60 kg.
2015-08-20	Win	(Belgium) Anke Van Gestel	I.F.M.A. Royal World cup Tournament 2015, Semi-finals -60 kg	Bangkok, Thailand	KO (Slam)	1	2:58
2015-08-16	Win	(Israel) Nili Block	I.F.M.A. Royal World cup Tournament 2015, Quarter Finals -60 kg	Bangkok, Thailand	Decision	3	3:00
2015-08-14	Win	(Morocco) Kaoutar Houkman	I.F.M.A. Royal World cup Tournament 2015, Eighth Finals -60 kg	Bangkok, Thailand	Decision	3	3:00
2014-05-10	Win	(Belarus) Mariya Valent	I.F.M.A. World Championship Tournament 2014, Finals -60 kg	Langkawi, Malaysia	Decision	3	3:00
Wins the I.F.M.A. World Championship Tournament Gold Medal -60 kg.
2014-05-06	Win	(Canada) Janice MacAulay	I.F.M.A. World Championship Tournament 2014, Semi-finals -60 kg	Langkawi, Malaysia	Decision	3	3:00
2014-05-05	Win	(Finland) Gia Winberg	I.F.M.A. World Championship Tournament 2014, Quarter Finals -60 kg	Langkawi, Malaysia	Decision	3	3:00
2014-05-01	Win	(Republic of Ireland) Siobhan Foley	I.F.M.A. World Championship Tournament 2014, Eighth Finals -60 kg	Langkawi, Malaysia	N/A	N/A	N/A
2013-10-23	Win	(Ukraine) Anastasia Sharmonova	2013 World Combat Games -60 kg/132 lb Muay Thai, Final	St. Petersburg, Russia	Decision	3	3:00
Wins the 2013 World Combat Games -60 kg/132 lb Muay Thai Gold Medal.
2013-10-21	Win	(Thailand) Pimnipa Tanawatpipat	2013 World Combat Games -60 kg/132 lb Muay Thai, Semi-final	St. Petersburg, Russia	Decision	3	3:00
2013-10-19	Win	(Mongolia) Zuunast Altansukh	2013 World Combat Games -60 kg/132 lb Muay Thai, Quarter Final	St. Petersburg, Russia	TKO (Body kick)	3	N/A
2012-09-12	Win	(Belarus) Katsiaryna Viaryha	I.F.M.A. World Championship Tournament 2012, Finals -60 kg	St. Petersburg, Russia	Decision	4	2:00
Wins the I.F.M.A. World Championship Tournament Gold Medal -60 kg.
2012-09-11	Win	(Poland) Magdalena Edyta	I.F.M.A. World Championship Tournament 2012, Semi-finals -60 kg	St. Petersburg, Russia	Decision	4	2:00
2012-09-10	Win	(France) Lambert Laetitia	I.F.M.A. World Championship Tournament 2012, Quarter Finals -60 kg	St. Petersburg, Russia	Decision	4	2:00
2012-09-07	Win	(Russia) Alfia Ishirgakova	I.F.M.A. World Championship Tournament 2012, First Round -60 kg	St. Petersburg, Russia	Decision	4	2:00
2011-09-26	Loss	(Morocco) Aicha El Majydy	I.F.M.A. World Championship Tournament 2011, Finals -60 kg	Tashkent, Uzbekistan	Decision	N/A	N/A
Wins the I.F.M.A. World Championship Tournament Silver Medal -60 kg.
2011-09-23	Win	(Russia) Alfia Ishirgakova	I.F.M.A. World Championship Tournament 2011, Semi-finals -60 kg	Tashkent, Uzbekistan	TKO (Punches)	4	1:07
2011-09-21	Win	(Belgium) Anke Van Gestel	I.F.M.A. World Championship Tournament 2011, Quarter Finals -60 kg	Tashkent, Uzbekistan	Decision	N/A	N/A
2010-12-06	Win	(Sweden) Lina Länsberg	I.F.M.A. World Championship Tournament 2010, Finals -63.5 kg	Bangkok, Thailand	Decision	4	2:00
Wins the I.F.M.A. World Championship Tournament Gold Medal -63.5 kg.
2010-12-05	Win	(Finland) Anna Willberg	I.F.M.A. World Championship Tournament 2010, Semi-finals -63.5 kg	Bangkok, Thailand	Decision	4	2:00
2010-12-03	Win	(Belarus) Marja Belush	I.F.M.A. World Championship Tournament 2010, Quarter Finals -63.5 kg	Bangkok, Thailand	TKO (Spinning back kick to the body)	3	1:46
2010-11-29	Win	(Ukraine) Valentina Gupalo	I.F.M.A. World Championship Tournament 2010, Eight Finals -63.5 kg	Bangkok, Thailand	Decision	4	2:00
2010-09-02	Win	(Australia) Caley Reece	2010 World Combat Games -60 kg/132 lb Muay Thai, Final	Beijing, China	Decision (Unanimous)	4	2:00
Wins the 2010 World Combat Games -60 kg/132 lb Muay Thai Gold Medal.
2010-08-31	Win	(Germany) Ania Fucz	2010 World Combat Games -60 kg/132 lb Muay Thai, Semi-finals	Beijing, China	KO (Slam)	2	1:47
2010-08-29	Win	(South Africa) Madeleine Ross	2010 World Combat Games -60 kg/132 lb Muay Thai, Quarter Finals	Beijing, China	Decision (Unanimous)	4	2:00
2010-04-07	Win	(Brazil) Adriana Rocha	I.F.M.A. Panamerican Championship Tournament 2009, Finals -60 kg	Vitoria, Brazil	Decision	3	3:00
Wins the I.F.M.A. Panamerican Championship Tournament Gold Medal -60 kg.
2009-12-04	Win	(Russia) Alena Muratova	I.F.M.A. World Championship Tournament 2009, Finals -60 kg	Bangkok, Thailand	Decision	3	3:00
Wins the I.F.M.A. World Championship Tournament Gold Medal -60 kg.
2009-12-?	Win	(United Kingdom) Carly Reece	I.F.M.A. World Championship Tournament 2009, Semi-finals -60 kg	Bangkok, Thailand	Decision	3	3:00
2009-12-?	Win	(Sweden) Emma Thyni	I.F.M.A. World Championship Tournament 2009, Quarter Finals -60 kg	Bangkok, Thailand	Decision	3	3:00
2008-09-?	Win	(Poland) Joanna Jędrzejczyk	I.F.M.A. World Championship Tournament 2008, Finals -57 kg	Busan, South Korea	Decision	3	3:00
Wins the I.F.M.A. World Championship Tournament Gold Medal -57 kg.
2008-09-?	Win	(Turkey) Gozde Bayergi	I.F.M.A. World Championship Tournament 2008, Semi-finals -57 kg	Busan, South Korea	Decision	3	3:00
2008-09-?	Win	(Belarus) Alla Ivashkevich	I.F.M.A. World Championship Tournament 2008, Quarter Finals -57 kg	Busan, South Korea	Decision	3	3:00
2008-09-?	Win	(Sweden) Mikaela Mélante	I.F.M.A. World Championship Tournament 2008, First Round -57 kg	Busan, South Korea	Decision	3	3:00
2007-12-?	Win	(Thailand) Vipavat Lasuwan	I.F.M.A. World Championship Tournament 2007, Finals -57 kg	Bangkok, Thailand	Decision	4	2:00
Wins the I.F.M.A. World Championship Tournament Gold Medal -57 kg.
2007-12-?	Win	(Finland) Liisi Airo	I.F.M.A. World Championship Tournament 2007, Semi-finals -57 kg	Bangkok, Thailand	Decision	4	2:00
2007-11-29	Win	(Poland) Joanna Jędrzejczyk	I.F.M.A. World Championship Tournament 2007, Quarter Finals -57 kg	Bangkok, Thailand	Decision	4	2:00
2006-06-07	Win	(Canada) Misty Sutherland	I.F.M.A. World Championship Tournament 2006, Finals -57 kg	Bangkok, Thailand	Decision	3	3:00
Wins the I.F.M.A. World Championship Tournament Gold Medal -57 kg.
2006-06-?	Win	(Australia) Heather O’Donnell	I.F.M.A. World Championship Tournament 2006, Semi-finals -57 kg	Bangkok, Thailand	Decision	3	3:00
2006-05-31	Win	(Poland) Joanna Jędrzejczyk	I.F.M.A. World Championship Tournament 2006, Quarter Finals -57 kg	Bangkok, Thailand	Decision	3	3:00
2006-03-26	Win	(United Kingdom) Nicola Simson	WMF World Championship Tournament 2006, Finals -57 kg	Bangkok, Thailand	N/A	N/A	N/A
Wins the WMF World Championship Tournament Gold Medal -57 kg.
2006-03-?	Win	(Ukraine) Maria Pymakova	WMF World Championship Tournament 2006, Semi-finals -57 kg	Bangkok, Thailand	N/A	N/A	N/A
2006-03-24	Win	(Germany) Ursula Trump	WMF World Championship Tournament 2006, Quarter Finals -57 kg	Bangkok, Thailand	N/A	N/A	N/A
2004-?-?	Win	(Russia) Oksana Kinak	WAKO World Championship Tournament 2004, Finals -56 kg	Massa, Italy	Decision	3	2:00
Wins the WAKO Full Contact World Championship Tournament Gold Medal -56 kg.
2004-?-?	Win	(Croatia) Ivana Didovich	WAKO World Championship Tournament 2004, Semi-finals -56 kg	Massa, Italy	Decision	3	2:00
2004-?-?	Win	(Poland) Kristina Tomasz	WAKO World Championship Tournament 2004, Quarter Finals -56 kg	Massa, Italy	N/A	N/A	N/A
2003-09-?	Win	(Russia) Yulia Semenova	I.F.M.A. World Championship Tournament 2003, Finals -57 kg	Almaty, Kazakhstan	N/A	N/A	N/A
Wins the I.F.M.A. World Championship Tournament Gold Medal -57 kg.
2003-09-?	Win	(Cyprus) Vikki Brangar	I.F.M.A. World Championship Tournament 2003, Semi-finals -57 kg	Almaty, Kazakhstan	N/A	N/A	N/A
2003-09-?	Win	(Ukraine) N/A	I.F.M.A. World Championship Tournament 2003, Quarter Finals -57 kg	Almaty, Kazakhstan	N/A	N/A	N/A
2003-09-?	Win	(India) N/A	I.F.M.A. World Championship Tournament 2003, First Round -57 kg	Almaty, Kazakhstan	N/A	N/A	N/A
Legend: Win Loss Draw/No contest Notes

== See also ==
- List of current UFC fighters
- List of female kickboxers
- List of female mixed martial artists
- List of multi-sport athletes
- List of multi-sport champions

== Notes ==
Achievements
Vacant Title last held by Nicco Montaño	2nd UFC Women's Flyweight Champion; December 8, 2018 – March 4, 2023	Succeeded by Alexa Grasso
Preceded by Alexa Grasso	4th UFC Women's Flyweight Champion; September 14, 2024 – October 3, 2026; Vacated	Vacant Title next held by Natália Silva
Awards
Preceded by Rose Namajunas	World MMA Female Fighter of the Year; 2021–22	Succeeded by Alexa Grasso
