= Anke Van Gestel =

Belgian kickboxer

- Born: Anke Van Gestel; 19 August 1993 (age 33); Merchtem, Belgium
- Nickname: "She Wolf"
- Nationality: Belgian
- Height: 1.70 m (5 ft 7 in)
- Weight: 64 kg (141 lb; 10 st 1 lb)
- Division: Lightweight; Super Lightweight; Light Welterweight
- Style: Kickboxing
- Stance: Orthodox
- Fighting out of: Merchtem, Belgium
- Team: Celtix Gym
- Trainer: Jeremy Van Audenhove
- Years active: 2010 - present

Kickboxing record
- Total: 43
- Wins: 28
- By knockout: 4
- Losses: 13
- By knockout: 2
- Draws: 2

Other information
- Occupation: Coach at the Celtix Gym
- University: Erasmushogeschool Brussel

Anke Van Gestel (born 19 August 1993) is a Belgian kickboxer, who has been professionally competing since 2010. She is the current ISKA World Super Lightweight K1 and Light Welterweight Oriental Rules champion, and the former Enfusion 61 and 64 kg Champion.

In June 2020, Combat Press ranked her as #8 female fighter in the world.

== Martial arts career ==
Anke Van Gestel had her first kickboxing bout against Griet Eeckhout in November 2010. She won the fight by unanimous decision to become the Belgian kickboxing champion.

In the following two years Van Gestel amassed an 8-1-2 record, with a notable win over Hatice Ozyurt. She then entered the Amazon of K-1 Grand Prix, but lost to Martina Jindrová in the first round.

After a win over Eva Berben, Van Gestel faced Ilona Wijmans for the inaugural Enfusion 61 kg title. She won the fight and title by unanimous decision.

Following her Enfusion title win, she fought Angélique Pitiot for the ISKA Super Lightweight World Championship. Pitiot would win a unanimous decision.

Van Gestel then challenged Sarah Debaieb and won the WFCS 61 kg title.

In 2014, a year after winning the Enfusion 61 kg title, she defended it with a unanimous decision win over Lindsay Haycraft.

This title defense was followed by a three fight losing streak, culminating with a failed bid to capture the WKU Lightweight title.

In 2015, Van Gestel once again defended her title with a unanimous decision win over Aleide Lawant. Her third and last title defense came against Niamh Kinehan during Enfusion 48.

In November 2017 Van Gestel challenged Deniz Batlini for the ISKA Super Lightweight title, and captured it with a unanimous decision win.

The following year she challenged Cindy Perros for the light welterweight ISKA World title, but lost a decision. In her following fight she once against faced Cindy Perros, but this time Van Gestel was defending her super lightweight title. She managed to win by a unanimous decision.

== Championships and accomplishments ==
=== Kickboxing Titles ===
- Enfusion
  - Enfusion 61 kg Championship
    - Two successful title defenses
  - Enfusion 64 kg Championship
    - One successful title defense
  - First Enfusion two weight champion
    - One of only four Enfusion two weight champions
- International Sport Karate Association
  - ISKA Super Lightweight K1 World Championship
    - One successful title defense
  - ISKA Light Welterweight Oriental Rules World Championship

=== Muay Thai Titles ===
- WCFS
  - WCFS 61 kg World Championship

== Kickboxing record ==
Kickboxing record
28 wins (4 KOs), 13 losses, 2 draws
Date	Result	Opponent	Event	Location	Method	Round	Time	Record
30 Nov 2019	Win	(Italy) Denise Cedola	Prime Time	Merchtem, Belgium	Decision (Unanimous)	3	3:00	28–13–2
23 Feb 2019	Win	(Netherlands) Sarel de Jong	Enfusion 78	Eindhoven, Netherlands	Decision (Unanimous)	3	3:00	27–13–2
9 Jun 2018	Win	(France) Cindy Perros	Prime Time 9	Merchtem, France	Decision (Unanimous)	5	3:00	26–13–2
Defends the ISKA Super Lightweight Title.
9 Jun 2018	Loss	(France) Cindy Perros	Gal Kickboxing	Quimperlé, France	Decision (Unanimous)	5	3:00	25–13–2
For the ISKA Light Welterweight Title.
6 May 2018	Loss	(Morocco) Anissa Haddaoui	Kunlun Fight 73	Sanya, China	Decision (Unanimous)	3	3:00	25–12–2
25 Nov 2017	Win	(Germany) Deniz Batlini	Prime Time 8	Merchtem, Belgium	Decision (Unanimous)	3	3:00	25–11–2
Wins the ISKA Super Lightweight Title.
23 Sep 2017	Loss	(Netherlands) Jorina Baars	Bellator Kickboxing 7	San Jose, California, United States	Decision (Unanimous)	5	3:00	24–11–2
20 May 2017	Win	(Netherlands) Orinta van der Zee	Battle Royal	Mariakerke, Belgium	Decision (Unanimous)	3	3:00	24–10–2
23 Sep 2017	Loss	(China) Wang Kehan	Kunlun Fight 61	Sanya, China	Decision (Unanimous)	3	3:00	23–10–2
24 Mar 2017	Win	(England) Niamh Kinehan	Enfusion 48	Abu Dhabi, United Arab Emirates	Decision (Unanimous)	5	3:00	23–9–2
Defends the Enfusion 64 kg Title.
26 Nov 2016	Win	(England) Niamh Kinehan	Prime Time 7	Merchtem, Belgium	Decision (Unanimous)	5	3:00	22–9–2
5 Jun 2016	Win	(Italy) Paola Cappucci	ACB KB 6: Battle in Brussels	Brussels, Belgium	TKO	1	2:45	21–9–2
7 May 2016	Win	(Morocco) Anissa Haddaoui	King Of The Ring IX	Hamme, Belgium	Decision (Unanimous)	3	3:00	20–9–2
19 Dec 2015	Win	(Netherlands) Rachida Bouhout	Enfusion 35	Antwerp, Belgium	Decision (Unanimous)	3	3:00	19–9–2
Wins the Enfusion 64 kg Title.
28 Nov 2015	Win	(Italy) Irene Martens	Prime Time 6	Merchtem, Belgium	Decision (Unanimous)	3	3:00	18–9–2
10 Oct 2015	Win	(Netherlands) Aleide Lawant	Enfusion 32	Ghent, Belgium	Decision (Unanimous)	5	3:00	17–9–2
Defends the Enfusion 61 kg Title.
24 Jul 2015	Loss	(Peru) Valentina Shevchenko	Legacy Kickboxing 3	Houston, Texas, United States	Decision (Unanimous)	3	3:00	16–9–2
6 Jun 2015	Win	(Netherlands) Sandra Sevilla	10eme Anniversaire de l’USAO Muaythai	Arras, France	Decision (Unanimous)	3	3:00	16–8–2
9 May 2015	Win	(Belgium) Eva Berben	The Night of no Return	Koersel, Belgium	KO	2		15–8–2
11 Dec 2014	Loss	(Germany) Julia Irmen	WKU World Title	Munich, Germany	Decision (Unanimous)	5	3:00	14–8–2
For the WKU Lightweight Title.
29 Nov 2014	Loss	(Netherlands) Rachida Bouhout	Prime Time 5	Merchtem, Belgium	Decision (Unanimous)	3	3:00	14–7–2
15 Nov 2014	Loss	(France) Angélique Pitiot	Les Princes de Salm 2	Moyenmoutier, France	TKO	5		14–6–2
13 Sep 2014	Loss	(Russia) Julia Berezikova	Tatneft Cup Rules KO	Kazan, Russian Federation	Decision (Unanimous)	3	3:00	14–5–2
25 May 2014	Win	(United States) Lindsay Haycraft	Enfusion Live: Push it 2 the Limit	Amsterdam, Netherlands	Decision (Unanimous)	5	3:00	14–4–2
Defends the Enfusion 61 kg Title.
13 Sep 2014	Win	(Netherlands) Claire Haigh	Kings of Muay Thaï 5	Luxembourg City, Luxembourg	Decision (Unanimous)	3	3:00	13–4–2
8 Feb 2014	Loss	(Netherlands) Claire Haigh	La Nuit du Kick-Boxing	Liège, Belgium	Decision (Unanimous)	3	3:00	12–4–2
30 Nov 2013	Win	(France) Stephanie Ielö Page	Battle Arena	Merchtem, Belgium	Decision (Unanimous)	3	3:00	12–3–2
11 May 2013	Win	(Netherlands) Sarah Debaieb	WFCS	France	Decision (Unanimous)	5	3:00	11–3–2
Wins the WFCS 61 kg Title.
4 May 2013	Loss	(France) Angélique Pitiot	La Nuit des revanches	Bagnolet, France	Decision (Unanimous)	5	3:00	10–3–2
For the ISKA Super Lightweight Title.
2 Feb 2013	Win	(Netherlands) Ilona Wijmans	Enfusion 1	Zwevegem, Belgium	Decision (Unanimous)	5	3:00	10–2–2
Wins the Enfusion 61 kg Title.
24 Nov 2012	Win	(Belgium) Eva Berben	Primetime 3	Merchtem, Belgium	Decision (Unanimous)	3	3:00	9–2–2
8 Sep 2012	Loss	(Czech Republic) Martina Jindrová	Amazon of K1 Grand Prix	Herne, Germany	Decision (Unanimous)	5	3:00	8–2–2
K1 Grand Prix Quarter Finals.
13 May 2012	Win	(Netherlands) Hatice Ozyurt	It’s Showtime	Kortrijk, Belgium	Decision (Unanimous)	3	3:00	8–1–2
31 Mar 2012	Loss	(Estonia) Jana Grishina	Fight Night 10	Tallinn, Estonia	Decision (Unanimous)	3	3:00	7–1–2
17 Mar 2012	Win	(Belgium) Eva Berben	?	Turnhout, Belgium	Decision (Unanimous)	3	3:00	7–0–2
18 Feb 2012	Win	(Italy) Viola Russo	?	Brussels, Belgium	TKO	3		6–0–2
4 Feb 2012	Win	(Netherlands) Salaysa van den Bos	?	Zwevegem, Belgium	Decision (Unanimous)	3	3:00	5–0–2
26 Nov 2011	Win	(Netherlands) Haïfa Fay	?	Merchtem, Belgium	TKO	3		4–0–2
8 Oct 2011	Win	(Netherlands) Hacer Temel	?	Dilsen-Stokkem, Belgium	Decision (Unanimous)	3	3:00	3–0–2
5 June 2011	Draw	(Netherlands) Sarah Debaieb	?	Beveren, Belgium	Decision (Unanimous)	3	3:00	2–0–2
14 May 2011	Win	(Belgium) Gina Hofman	?	Belgium	Decision (Unanimous)	3	3:00	2–0–1
5 Feb 2011	Draw	(Belgium) Viola Russo	?	Zwevegem, Belgium	Decision (Unanimous)	3	3:00	1–0–1
27 Nov 2010	Win	(Belgium) Griet Eeckhout	?	Merchtem, Belgium	Decision (Unanimous)	3	3:00	1–0
Legend: Win Loss Draw/No contest Notes

== See also ==
- List of female kickboxers
