= List of female kickboxers =

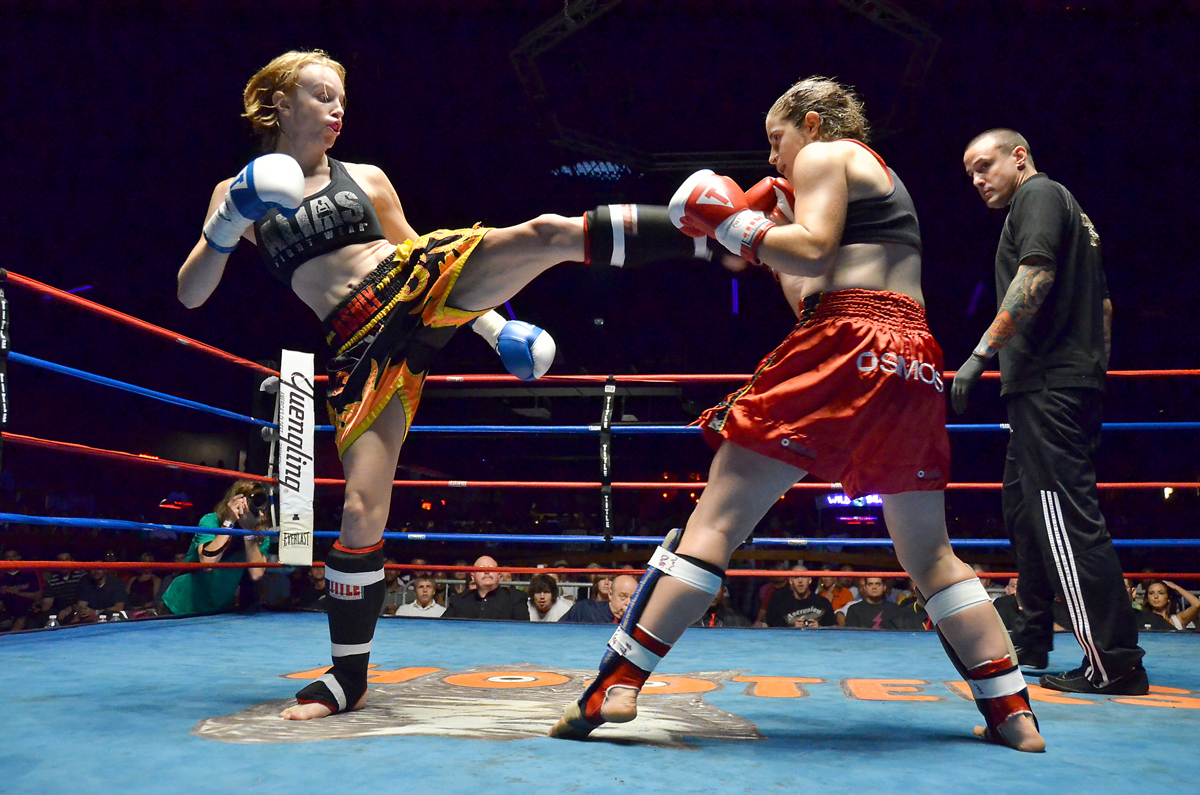

This is a list of notable female kickboxers. This list shows kickboxers and professional competitors of other martial arts such as bama-lethwei (Burmese boxing), kickboxing, pradal serey (khmer boxing), sanshou (sanda), savate boxing and shoot boxing.

== A ==
- (Japan) Akari
- (Netherlands) Cheyenne Aldus
- (England) Bernise Alldis
- (France) Anaëlle Angerville
- (Uganda) Patricia Apolot
- (Thailand) Zaza Sor. Aree
- (United Kingdom) Ruth Ashdown
- (Syria) Azza Attoura
- (Thailand) Phayahong Ayothayafightgym

== B ==
- (Netherlands) Jorina Baars
- (United States) Christine Bannon-Rodrigues
- (England) Iman Barlow
- (Turkey) Erivan Barut
- (England) Ruqsana Begum
- (Turkey) Lehize Hilal Benli
- (Netherlands) Jemyma Betrian
- (Israel) Nili Block
- (Russia) Anna Bogomazova
- (France) Caroline Bossa
- (Norway) Cecilia Brækhus
- (England) Christi Brereton
- (England) Cathy Brown
- (Italy) Annalisa Bucci
- (Canada) Julia Budd
- (Czech Republic) Viktorie Bulínová

== C ==
- (Scotland) Joanne Calderwood
- (United States) Bonnie Canino
- (United States) Gina Carano
- (United States) Graciela Casillas
- (Thailand) Parinya Charoenphol
- (Austria) Jasminka Cive
- (Belgium) Hélène Connart
- (England) Sophia Crawford
- (Slovakia) Monika Chochlíková

== D ==
- (Portugal) Inês Daniela
- (France) Amel Dehby
- (England) Dakota Ditcheva
- (Turkey) Sevgi Doğan
- (Turkey) Zehra Doğan
- (United States) Jessamyn Duke
- (Thailand) Dangkongfah

== E ==
- (United States) Lisa Ellis
- (Suriname) Ilonka Elmont
- (Japan) erika♡
- (Portugal) Débora Évora
- (Brazil) Maria Eduarda

== F ==
- (New Zealand) Genah Fabian
- (Thailand) Stamp Fairtex
- (Spain) Lara Fernandez
- (Turkey) Yeliz Findik
- (France) Aurélie Froment
- (Germany) Ania Fucz
- (Japan) Emi Fujino
- (Japan) Fuu

== G ==
- (Netherlands) Mellony Geugjes
- (United States) Fredia Gibbs
- (Russia) Elina Gismeeva
- (France) Eva Guillot
- (Sweden) Therese Gunnarsson
- (United States) Zoila Frausto Gurgel

== H ==
- (Morocco) Anissa Haddaoui
- (Luxembourg) Claire Haigh
- (Germany) Regina Halmich
- (South Korea) Seo Hee Ham
- (United States) Felice Herrig
- (United States) Angela Hill
- (Japan) Koto Hiraoka
- (Norway) Anne Line Hogstad
- (United States) Holly Holm
- (Japan) Nanaka Honda
- (Australia) Bec Hyatt

== I ==
- (Japan) Mai Ichii
- (Sweden) Jill Idh
- (United States) Diana Lee Inosanto
- (Japan) Mizuki Inoue
- (Japan) Saori Ishioka
- (Japan) Saya Ito

== J ==
- (Poland) Joanna Jędrzejczyk
- (Netherlands) Sarel de Jong
- (Brazil) Cristiane Justino

== K ==
- (France) Mallaury Kalachnikoff
- (Japan) Erika Kamimura
- (China) Wang Kehan
- (Scotland) Amanda Kelly
- (Netherlands) Denise Kielholtz
- (Japan) Kiho
- (Japan) Mona Kimura
- (United States) Justine Kish
- (England) Julie Kitchen
- (Netherlands) Lorena Klijn
- (Japan) Arina Kobayashi
- (Japan) Honoka Kobayashi
- (Japan) Manazo Kobayashi
- (Netherlands) Tessa de Kom
- (Japan) Kotomi
- (Poland) Karolina Kowalkiewicz
- (Germany) Johanna Kruse
- (Japan) Rena Kubota
- (Japan) Naoko Kumagai

== L ==
- (Italy) Silvia La Notte
- (Bulgaria) Daisy Lang
- (France) Lizzie Largillière
- (Iran) (Canada) Farinaz Lari
- (France) Ludivine Lasnier
- (United States) Andrea Lee
- (United States) Mimi Lesseos
- (South Korea) Su Jeong Lim
- (Brazil) Juliana Lima
- (Sweden) Josefine Lindgren Knutsson
- (France) Aurore Llorens
- (United States) Kathy Long
- (Thailand) Loma Lookboonmee

== M ==
- (France) Emilie Machut
- (France) Laëtitia Madjene
- (France) Anne Sophie Mathis
- (Japan) Kira Matsutani
- (United States) Layla McCarter
- (China) E Meidie
- (France) Anissa Meksen
- (Italy) Martine Michieletto
- (Croatia) Nevenka Mikulic
- (Japan) Mei Miyamoto
- (Japan) Ayaka Miyauchi
- (Japan) Koyuki Miyazaki
- (Japan) Wakana Miyazaki
- (Spain) Cristina Morales
- (Japan) Kana Morimoto
- (Japan) Misaki Morita
- (France) Sarah Moussadak
- (United States) Kathleen Murphy
- (Australia) Serin Murray

== N ==
- (Japan) Nadeshiko
- (United States) Miriam Nakamoto
- (Spain) Eva Naranjo
- (Japan) Sakura Nomura

== O ==
- (United Kingdom) Geraldine O'Callaghan
- (Japan) Runa Okumura
- (Republic of the Congo) Dorcas Ollita
- (Sweden) Sofia Olofsson
- (Ukraine) Lena Ovchynnikova
- (Netherlands) Hatice Ozyurt

== P ==
- (England) Lucy Payne
- (Portugal) Dina "Dinamite" Pedro
- (United States) Jessica Penne
- (France) Clara Pennequin
- (Brazil) Aline Pereira
- (Italy) Gloria Peritore
- (France) Cindy Perros
- (Scotland) Amy Pirnie
- (France) Angélique Pitiot
- (Greece) Antonia Prifti

== R ==
- (Kazakhstan) (Russia) Natascha Ragosina
- (France) Fanny Ramos
- (Netherlands) Germaine de Randamie
- (Australia) Caley Reece
- (United States) Elena Reid
- (Netherlands) Lucia Rijker
- (United States) Bridgett Riley
- (Japan) Panchan Rina
- (United States) (Australia) Angela Rivera-Parr
- (England) Alexis Rufus

== S ==
- (Israel) Yulia Sachkov
- (Turkey) (Germany) Asiye Ozlem Sahin
- (Germany) Hulya Sahin
- (Japan) Seina
- (Turkey) Sabriye Şengül
- (Russia) (Peru) (Kyrgyzstan) Antonina Shevchenko
- (Russia) (Peru) (Kyrgyzstan) Valentina Shevchenko
- (Japan) Sachiyo Shibata
- (France) Cindy Silvestre
- (Japan) Haruka Shimada
- (United States) Jeri Sitzes
- (England) Grace Spicer
- (Romania) Cristiana Stancu
- (United States) J.A. Steel
- (Lithuania) Julija Stoliarenko
- (Czech Republic) Klára Strnadová
- (Japan) Aki Suematsu
- (Japan) Miyuu Sugawara

== T ==
- (Thailand) Chommanee Sor Taehiran
- (Japan) Ai Takahashi
- (Japan) Miho Takanashi
- (Japan) Yoko Takahashi
- (United States) Jennifer Tate
- (Japan) Hinata Terayama
- (Germany) Christine Theiss
- (Japan) Yun Toshima
- (Australia) Kim Townsend
- (Austria) Nicole Trimmel
- (Greece) Sofia Tsolakidou
- (Japan) Mio Tsumura
- (Turkey) Gülistan Turan
- (Canada) Charmaine Tweet

== U ==
- (Italy) Chantal Ughi
- (Germany) Meryem Uslu

== V ==
- (Italy) Jleana Valentino
- (Belgium) Anke Van Gestel
- (Netherlands) Saskia van Rijswijk
- (United States) Tiffany van Soest
- (Belarus) Ekaterina Vandaryeva
- (Italy) Veronica Vernocchi
- (Italy) Chiara Vincis
- (Ukraine) Oksana Vozovic

== W ==
- (China) Cong Wang
- (United States) Michelle Waterson
- (United States) Cheryl Wheeler
- (Sweden) Teresa Wintermyr

== Y ==
- (Japan) Megumi Yabushita
- (Japan) Mako Yamada
- (Japan) Mei Yamaguchi
- (Japan) Hiroko Yamanaka
- (Japan) Saho Yoshino
- (United States) Kaitlin Young

== See also ==
- List of male kickboxers
