= Inês Daniela =

Portuguese kickboxer

- Born: Inês Daniela; Porto, Portugal
- Weight: 50 kg (110 lb; 7.9 st)
- Style: Kickboxing
- Stance: Orthodox
- Fighting out of: Ponferrada, Spain
- Team: Mamba Fight Club
- Trainer: Diego Vasquez; Tito Macias
- Years active: 2023 - present

Kickboxing record
- Total: 16
- Wins: 13
- By knockout: 1
- Losses: 3
- By knockout: 1
- Draws: 0

Inês Daniela is a Portuguese kickboxer. She is the reigning WAKO Pro K-1 World Flyweight champion.

As of January 2025, she is ranked as the ninth best women's flyweight kickboxer in the world by Beyond Kick.

== Kickboxing career ==
Daniela faced Alba Morral at Queen of Queens '24 on March 8, 2024. She won the fight by unanimous decision.

Daniela faced Carmen Sánchez at MFC Showdown 038 on May 18, 2024. She won the fight by decision.

Daniela faced Sonia Dinh for the vacant WAKO-Pro Mediterranean K-1 Rules Flyweight (-50 kg) championship at MFC Showdown 042 on December 7, 2024. She captured the title by unanimous decision.

Daniela faced reigning champion Alessia Muroni for the WAKO-Pro World K-1 Rules Flyweight (-50 kg) championship at MFC Showdown 049 on November 29, 2025. She won her second WAKO title by unanimous decision.

Daniela faced Teodora Kirilova for the inaugural EFA K-1 Atomweight title at the first event of Elite Fight Arena on March 21, 2026. She lost the fight via technical knockout due to a doctor stoppage.

During FCE 5 on June 18, 2026. she faced Lyndsey Thomas. Daniela lost the fight by unanimous decision.

== Championships and accomplishments ==
=== Professional ===
- Queen of Queens
  - 2024 Queen of Queens -53 kg Championship
- Mamba Fight Club
  - 2024 MFC K-1 International -50 kg Championship
    - One successful title defense
- World Association of Kickboxing Organizations
  - 2024 WAKO-Pro K-1 Mediterranean Flyweight (-50 kg) Championship
  - 2025 WAKO-Pro K-1 World Flyweight (-50 kg) Championship
    - One successful title defense

== Fight record ==
Professional Kickboxing record
13 Wins (1 (T)KO's), 3 Losses, 0 Draw, 0 No Contests
Date	Result	Opponent	Event	Location	Method	Round	Time
2026-11-22	Win	(Spain) Sheila Martínez	Cádiz Fight Night 7	El Puerto de Santa María, Spain	Decision (unanimous)	5	3:00
Defends the WAKO Pro K-1 World Flyweight (-50 kg) title.
2026-06-18	Loss	(France) Lyndsey Thomas	FCE 5	Lisbon, Portugal	Decision (unanimous)	3	3:00
2026-03-21	Loss	(Bulgaria) Teodora Kirilova	Elite Fight Arena	Sofia, Bulgaria	TKO (doctor stoppage)	4	
For the inaugural EFA K-1 Atomweight (-52.2 kg) title.
2025-11-29	Win	(Italy) Alessia Muroni	MFC Showdown 049	Ponferrada, Spain	Decision (unanimous)	5	3:00
Wins the WAKO Pro K-1 World Flyweight (-50 kg) title.
2025-08-09	Win	(Spain) Isabel Ruiz Pulido	MFC Showdown 047	Ponferrada, Spain	Decision	3	3:00
2025-04-26	Win	(Portugal) Isabel Oliveira	MFC Showdown 045	Noia, Spain	Decision	5	3:00
Defends the MFC K-1 (-50 kg) title..
2024-12-07	Win	(Switzerland) Sonia Dinh	MFC Showdown 042	Ponferrada, Spain	Decision (unanimous)	5	3:00
Wins the vacant WAKO Pro K-1 Mediterranean Flyweight (-50 kg) title.
2024-08-10	Win	(Spain) Maialen Gallardo	MFC Showdown 040	Ponferrada, Spain	Decision (unanimous)	3	3:00
2024-07-06	Win	(Portugal) Inés Correia	MFC Showdown 039	Vilamartín de Valdeorras, Spain	TKO (referee stoppage)	3	
Wins the MFC K-1 (-50 kg) title.
2024-05-18	Win	(Spain) Carmen Sánchez	MFC Showdown 038	Ponferrada, Spain	Decision	3	3:00
2024-03-08	Win	(Spain) Alba Morral	Queen of Queens '24	Barcelona, Spain	Decision (unanimous)	5	3:00
Wins the Queen of Queens (-53 kg) title..
2024-02-24	Win	(Portugal) Isabel Oliveira	MFC Showdown 035	Vilamartín de Valdeorras, Spain	Decision	3	3:00
2023-12-16	Win	(Spain) Sandra Ramírez	MFC Showdown 034	Ponferrada, Spain	Decision (unanimous)	3	3:00
Legend: Win Loss Draw/No contest Notes

== See also ==
- List of female kickboxers
