= Aurore Llorens =

French kickboxer

- Born: Aurore Llorens; October 4, 1999 (age 27); France
- Height: 1.77 m (5 ft 9 1/2 in)
- Weight: 63 kg (139 lb; 9.9 st)
- Style: Kickboxing
- Stance: Orthodox
- Fighting out of: Perpignan, France
- Team: Carcharias Boxing
- Trainer: Christophe Errera
- Years active: 2023 - present

Kickboxing record
- Total: 12
- Wins: 11
- By knockout: 3
- Losses: 1
- By knockout: 0
- Draws: 0

Aurore Llorens (born 4 October 1999) is a French kickboxer.

As of February 2024, she is ranked as the ninth best Women's Openweight in the world by Beyond Kickboxing.

== Kickboxing career ==
Llorens faced Cindy Perros at Ultimate Fight Night 10 on January 20, 2023. She won the fight by decision.

During BFS Event 4 on March 9, 2024, she faced Clara Pennequin. Llorens won the fight by decision.

Llorens faced Celya Chelghaf at World GBC Tour on October 15, 2025. She won the fight by decision.

Llorens faced Marieke Calis at World Fighting League on January 25, 2026. She lost the fight by decision.

On May 30, 2026, Llorens faced Selma El Hassouni at Ambrosis Boxing Challenge 3. She won the fight by unanimous decision.

== Championships and accomplishments ==
=== Professional ===
- World Kickboxing Network
  - 2023 WKN K-1 European (-62.1 kg) Champion
- International Sport Kickboxing Association
  - 2024 ISKA K-1 European Lightweight (-61 kg) Champion

== Fight record ==
Professional Kickboxing record
11 Wins (3 (T)KO's), 1 Losses, 0 Draw, 0 No Contests
Date	Result	Opponent	Event	Location	Method	Round	Time
2026-12-12		(Netherlands) Marieke Calis	Thaï Boxing Showtime 8	Hazebrouck, France			
2026-05-30	Win	(Belgium) Selma El Hassouni	Ambrosis Boxing Challenge 3	Plan-de-Cuques, France	Decision (Unanimous)	3	3:00
2026-01-25	Loss	(Netherlands) Marieke Calis	World Fighting League	Utrecht, Netherlands	Decision	3	3:00
2025-10-15	Win	(France) Celya Chelghaf	World GBC Tour	Avignon, France	Decision	3	3:00
2024-12-14	Win	(Romania) Denisa Vulpe	Fight Event	Perpignan, France	Decision (Unanimous)	5	3:00
Wins the vacant ISKA K-1 European Lightweight (-61 kg) Championship.
2024-09-21	Win	(Belgium) Jawaher Barrhane	X-plosif	Sète, France	TKO (Corner stoppage)	2	
2024-03-09	Win	(France) Clara Pennequin	BFS Event 4	Nimes, France	Decision	3	3:00
2024-02-24	Win	(Czech Republic) Šárka Melínová	UAM Fight Night	Abu Dhabi, United Arab Emirates	Decision	3	3:00
2024-01-21	Win	(Italy) Manuela Innocenti	NFC Show Fight	Saint-Sulpice-la-Pointe, France	Decision	3	3:00
2023-06-10	Win	(Italy) Chiara Vincis	La Nuit du Kick	Bastia, France	Decision (Unanimous)	3	3:00
2023-04-08	Win	(Czech Republic) Tereza Dvořáková	Boxing Supremacy 2	Alès, France	TKO (Doctor stoppage)	3	
Wins the vacant WKN K-1 European (-62.1 kg) Championship.
2023-02-04	Win	(France) Elsa Hemat	La Nuit De l'Uppercut 6	Veigné, France	TKO	2	
2023-01-20	Win	(France) Cindy Perros	Ultimate Fight Night 10	Brest, France	Decision	3	3:00
Legend: Win Loss Draw/No contest Notes

== See also ==
- List of female kickboxers
