= Patricia Apolot =

Female Ugandan martial artist

- Born: 6 November 1990 (age 35); Ngora, Uganda
- Citizenship: Uganda
- Occupations: Professional Kickboxer & Taekwondo Athlete
- Years active: 2010 – present
- Known for: Kickboxing & Taekwondo

Patricia Apolot is a female Ugandan professional martial artist. She is the reigning Ugandan female kickboxing champion and also holds the Super Lightweight World Kickboxing Federation International title, obtained in June 2015, by defeating Ivana Mirkov of Serbia, in Dunaújváros, Hungary.

== Early life and education ==
Patricia was born to Josephine Aujo and Emmanuel Mukula on 6 November 1990. She grew up in Ngora, under the care of her maternal great grandmother. She attended St. Aloysius Primary School from 1996 to 2002, transferring to Teso Integrated Secondary School, where she completed her O-Level studies in 2006. She completed S6 in 2008.

Following completion of her A-Level studies, she relocated to Kampala to live with her mother. After trying several vocational endeavors, including football, she settled on boxing in 2010. That changed to kickboxing in 2013. In 2014, she became a professional kickboxer.

== Career ==
In July 2014, she successfully defended her national kickboxing title by defeating Jackie Nassimbwa On 27 June 2015, in Dunaújváros, Hungary, Patricia Apolot defeated Ivana Mirkov of Serbia, in a World Kickboxing Federation (WKBF) female Lightweight title fight. At the time of her defeat, Ivana was ranked number 16 in the world by the WKBF. In November 2015, Apolot successfully defended her title by defeating then reigning Hungarian champion Anita Nagy, also in Dunaújváros, via a technical knock-out. The ambitious juvenile had other ideas though, and tried several avocations; from police training to a successful attempt at football with Proline Football Academy for nearly two years. She reached a high level and played several games with the national team of Uganda.

== Awards and recognition ==
Patricia Apolot holds the following titles and honors:

1. Gold Medallist - Mt. Gorilla Taekwondo Open
2. Gold Medallist - 2013 East Africa Inter-Club Boxing Championships
3. 2014 National Kickboxing Champion (Female Lightweight Division)
4. World Kickboxing Federation International Titleholder (Female Lightweight Division).
