= Ossel =

Coordinates: 50.922°N 4.279°E

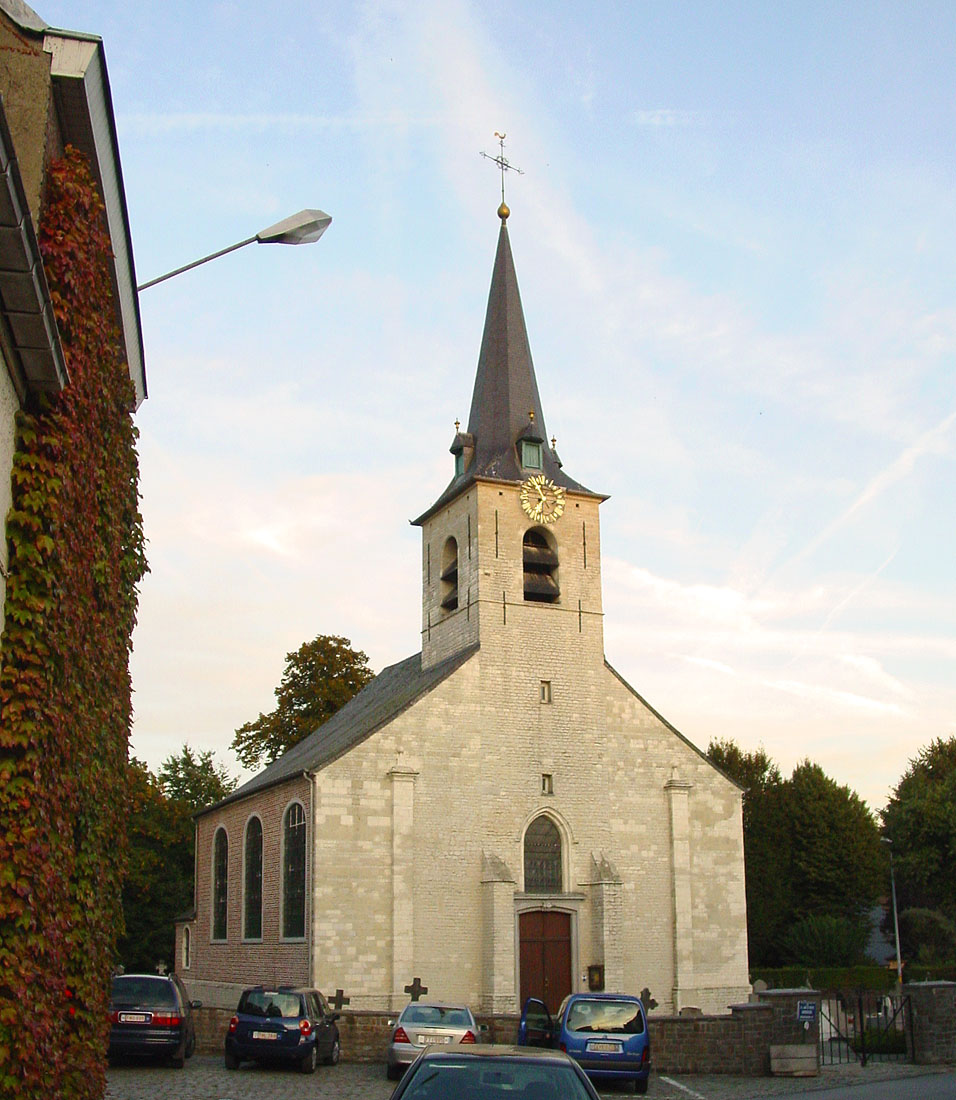
St John the Baptist church in Ossel

Ossel is a hamlet in Flemish Brabant, Belgium. It is part of the municipality of Merchtem.

The hamlet is built around the church of St John the Baptist, which dates from the Middle Ages. The nave was built in 1632 and the extension of the aisles in 1779. In 2007, paintings dating from the late medieval period were uncovered under the limestone vaults of the choir.
