= Johanna Kruse =

German kickboxer

- Born: 19 April 1992 (age 34); Heidelberg, Germany
- Nickname: The Killer
- Nationality: German
- Height: 1.78 m (5 ft 10 in)
- Weight: 65 kg (143 lb; 10 st 3 lb)
- Division: Light Welterweight; Welterweight
- Style: Kickboxing
- Fighting out of: Heidelberg, Germany
- Team: Box Gymnasium Heidelberg

Professional boxing record
- Total: 5
- Wins: 5
- By knockout: 5

Kickboxing record
- Total: 35
- Wins: 28
- Losses: 5
- Draws: 2

Other information
- Boxing record from BoxRec

Johanna Kruse (born 19 April 1992) is a German boxer and kickboxer. She is the current ISKA World K-1 Light Welterweight champion.

== Martial arts career ==
=== Kickboxing career ===
During Explosion Fight Night 8, Kruse fought for the ISKA European Light Welterweight Freestyle title against Cindy Perros. Kruse would ultimately lose a unanimous decision.

During the inaugural It's Fight Time event, Kruse fought for the ISKA World Light Welterweight K-1 title against Sarah Glandien. Kruse won the title by a second-round KO.

Kruse fought for the Enfusion 67 kg title against Dolly McBean during Enfusion 64. McBean won a unanimous decision. She challenged for the title again during Enfusion 73, against Sarah Gobel. Kruse won the title by a unanimous decision. Her first defense of the title was during Enfusion 84, against Sheena Widdershoven. Kruse lost the fight, and the title, by a decision.

=== Boxing career ===
Johanna Kruse made her boxing debut in March 2018, with a TKO win over Teodora Vidic. She has since fought four more times, and has ended each of her fights by TKO. Kruse is ranked as the #18 Super Welterweight by BoxRec, as of June 2020.

== Championships and accomplishments ==
- International Sport Karate Association
  - ISKA World K-1 Light Welterweight Championship
- Enfusion
  - Enfusion 67 kg World Championship

== Kickboxing record ==
Kickboxing record
28 wins (9 KOs), 5 losses, 2 draw
Date	Result	Opponent	Event	Location	Method	Round	Time
5 Apr 2019	Loss	(Netherlands) Sheena Widdershoven	Enfusion 84	Eindhoven, Netherlands	Decision (Unanimous)	5	2:00
For the Enfusion 67 kg title.
27 Oct 2018	Win	(Netherlands) Sarah Gobel	Enfusion 73	Oberhausen, Germany	Decision (Unanimous)	5	2:00
Wins the Enfusion 67 kg title.
20 Apr 2018	Loss	(Netherlands) Dolly McBean	Enfusion 64	Oberhausen, Germany	Decision (Unanimous)	5	2:00
For the Enfusion 67 kg title.
7 Oct 2017	Win	(Turkey) Deniz Batinli	Enfusion 54	Ludwigsburg, Germany	Decision (Unanimous)	3	3:00
3 Dec 2016	Loss	(United States) Kaitlin Young	Mix Fight Gala XX	Frankfurt, Germany	Decision (Split)	3	3:00
12 Sep 2015	Draw	(Netherlands) Sarah Debaieb	It's Fight Time 2	Darmstadt, Germany	Decision (Unanimous)	3	3:00
15 Jun 2015	Win	(Germany) Sarah Glandien	It's Fight Time	Germany	KO (Punch)	2	
Wins the ISKA European Light Welterweight K-1 title.
12 May 2015	Win	(China) He Qun	Mix Fight Gala 19	Germany	TKO (Punches and kicks)	2	
16 Nov 2013	Loss	(France) Cindy Perros	Explosion Fight Night 8	Brest, France	Decision (Unanimous)	3	3:00
For the ISKA Light Welterweight Freestyle title.
1 Sep 2012	Loss	(Germany) Larissa Kung	Mix Fight Gala 13	Frankfurt, Germany	TKO (Punches)	2	
Legend: Win Loss Draw/No contest Notes

== Professional boxing record ==
5 fights	5 wins	0 losses
By knockout	5	0
Draws	0	

No.	Result	Record	Opponent	Type	Round, time	Date	Location	Notes
5	Win	5-0	(Bosnia and Herzegovina) Andrea Dukic	TKO	2	9 March 2019	Dom Mladih, Sarajevo, Bosnia and Herzegovina	
4	Win	4-0	(Serbia) Jelena Drakulic	TKO	1	1 December 2018	Altrheinhalle, Rastatt, Germany	
3	Win	3-0	(Hungary) Dora Tollar	KO	3	29 September 2018	Ritter-Sport-Stadion, Waldenbuch, Germany	
2	Win	2-0	(Germany) Danka Matijasevic	TKO	1	16 June 2018	Wildparkstadion, Karlsruhe, Germany	
1	Win	1-0	(Bosnia and Herzegovina) Teodora Vidic	TKO	1	3 March 2018	Ufgauhalle, Karlsruhe, Germany	

== See also ==
List of female kickboxers

List of female boxers
