= Nanaka Honda =

Japanese kickboxer

- Born: 29 June 2001 (age 25); Fukuoka, Japan
- Height: 1.63 m (5 ft 4 in)
- Weight: 50 kg (110 lb; 7 st 12 lb)
- Style: Kickboxing, Karate
- Team: TRY HARD GYM
- Years active: 2023 - present

Kickboxing record
- Total: 7
- Wins: 6
- Losses: 1
- Draws: 0

Nanaka Honda (Japanese: 本田ななか, Honda Nanaka; born June 29, 2001) is a Japanese kickboxer. She is the current KROSS×OVER PRO-KICK Women's Flyweight champion. As of June 2024, she is ranked as the tenth-best women's strawweight kickboxer in the world by Beyond Kickboxing.

== Professional career ==
Honda made her professional kickboxing debut against Maho Kataoka at KROSS×OVER.22 on August 13, 2023. She won the fight by split decision.

Honda faced Ayako Ogasawara at KROSS×OVER.23 on October 22, 2023. She won the fight by unanimous decision.

Honda faced Yun Toshima at KROSS×OVER.24 on December 17, 2023. She won the fight by unanimous decision.

Honda faced Mai Hanada at RISE EVOL.12 on May 12, 2024. She won the fight by unanimous decision.

Honda was scheduled to face Yura at RISE 182 on October 20, 2024. She was disqualified for not being able to come to the weigh-in because of poor physical condition due to weight loss.

Honda withdrew from ONE Friday Fights 94 due to doctor's orders on January 17, 2025.

Honda is scheduled to face Zaineb Tanji at ONE Friday Fights 113 on June 20, 2025.

== Championships and accomplishments ==
=== Kickboxing ===
==== Professional ====
- KROSS×OVER
  - 2023 KROSS×OVER PRO-KICK Women's Flyweight Championship

==== Amateur ====
- 2023 Amateur Dageki Kakutougi Japan Cup -53 kg Winner

=== Karate ===
- World Karate Organization
  - 2018 WKO Japan Athlete Cup High School -53 kg Winner
  - 2019 WKO Japan Athlete Cup High School -53 kg Runner-up
  - 2020 WKO Japan Athlete Cup High School -53 kg Winner
- Japan Karate Judge Organization
  - 2018 JKJO All Japan Championship High School -55 kg Third place

== Fight record ==
Professional Kickboxing record
6 Wins (0 (T)KO), 1 Loss, 0 Draw
Date	Result	Opponent	Event	Location	Method	Round	Time
2026-07-05	Win	(Japan) Momo	KrossxOver 36	Tokyo, Japan	Decision (Unanimous)	3	3:00
2026-04-19	Win	(Japan) Haruka Asai	KrossxOver 35	Tokyo, Japan	Decision (Unanimous)	3	3:00
2024-10-20	Loss	(Japan) Yura	RISE 182	Tokyo, Japan	Lose by default		
2024-05-12	Win	(Japan) Mai Hanada	RISE EVOL.12	Tokyo, Japan	Decision (Unanimous)	3	3:00
2023-12-17	Win	(Japan) Yun Toshima	KROSS×OVER.24	Tokyo, Japan	Decision (Unanimous)	3	3:00
Wins the inaugural KROSS×OVER PRO-KICK Women's Flyweight Championship.
2023-10-22	Win	(Japan) Ayako Ogasawara	KROSS×OVER.23	Tokyo, Japan	Decision (Unanimous)	3	2:00
2023-08-13	Win	(Japan) Maho Kataoka	KROSS×OVER.22	Tokyo, Japan	Decision (Split)	3	2:00

Amateur Kickboxing record
Date	Result	Opponent	Event	Location	Method	Round	Time
2023-05-21	Win	(Japan) Ami Toyama	Amateur Dageki Kakutougi Japan Cup, Final	Tokyo, Japan	Decision (Unanimous)	1	2:00
Wins the 2024 Amateur Dageki Kakutougi Japan Cup -53kg title.
2023-05-21	Win	(Japan) Yuna Uejima	Amateur Dageki Kakutougi Japan Cup, Semifinal	Tokyo, Japan	Decision (Unanimous)	1	2:00
2023-02-26	Win	(Japan) Minori Tsukamoto	Stand Up Amateur in Tokyo 11	Tokyo, Japan	Decision (Unanimous)	1	2:00
2022-08-07	Loss	(Japan) Ayako Ogasawara	RISE NOVA All Japan Tournament, Second Round	Tokyo, Japan	Decision (Unanimous)	1	3:00

== See also ==
- List of female kickboxers
