= Caroline Bossa =

French kickboxer

- Born: Caroline Bossa; 1997 (age 28–29)
- Height: 1.65 m (5 ft 5 in)
- Weight: 50 kg (110 lb; 7.9 st)
- Style: Kickboxing
- Stance: Orthodox
- Fighting out of: Bandol, France
- Team: Extrême Fighting Bandol Club
- Trainer: William Wustenberg; Julien Martinez

Kickboxing record
- Total: 13
- Wins: 12
- By knockout: 1
- Losses: 1
- By knockout: 0
- Draws: 0

Caroline Bossa is a French kickboxer.

As of July 2026, she is ranked the #10 best Women's Strawweight in the world by Beyond Kickboxing.

== Professional Kickboxing career ==
During the first edition of United Fight Night Corsica on May 4, 2024, she faced Nicosia Giada. Bossa won the fight by decision.

On June 15, 2024, Bossa faced Alizée Varlet at Trophée de l'Impact 2. She won the fight by decision.

Bossa faced Alba Garcia Fernandez for the inaugural Trophée de l'Impact (-54 kg) title at Trophée de l'Impact #3 on June 7, 2025. She won the title by decision.

Bossa faced Cátia Batista for the vacant WAKO Pro Low Kick European Flyweight (-50 kg) title at United Fight Night #7 on January 31, 2026. She won the title by decision.

== Championships and accomplishments ==
=== Professional ===
- United Fight Night
  - 2024 UFN -52 kg Champion
- Trophée de l'Impact
  - 2025 Trophée de l'Impact -54 kg Champion
- World Association of Kickboxing Organizations
  - 2026 WAKO-Pro Low Kick European Flyweight (-50 kg) Champion

== Fight record ==
Professional Kickboxing record
12 Wins (1 (T)KO's), 1 Losses, 0 Draw, 0 No Contests
| Date | Result | Opponent | Event | Location | Method | Round | Time |
| 2026-10-05 | Win | (Portugal) Maria Ferreira | UAE Warriors 73 | Cascais, Portugal | Decision (unanimous) | 3 | 3:00 |
| 2026-06-27 | Win | (France) Chaïna Tavares | Urban Fight Show | Six-Fours-les-Plages, France | TKO | 2 | |
| 2026-01-31 | Win | (Portugal) Cátia Batista | United Fight Night 7 | Toulon, France | Decision | 5 | 3:00 |
Wins the vacant WAKO Pro Low Kick European Flyweight (-50 kg) title.
| 2025-06-07 | Win | (Spain) Alba Garcia Fernandez | Trophée de l'Impact 3 | Pignans, France | Decision | 3 | 3:00 |
Wins the vacant Trophée de l'Impact (-54 kg) title.
| 2025-05-17 | Win | (Spain) María Barrera Ramos | United Fight Night Corsica 2 | Ghisonaccia, France | Decision | 3 | 3:00 |
| 2025-03-07 | Win | (Italy) Agata Bartoli | United Fight Night 6 | Toulon, France | Decision | 3 | 3:00 |
| 2024-12-21 | Win | (France) Louna Aubert | TK2 World Max 2024 | Marseille, France | Decision | 3 | 3:00 |
| 2024-06-15 | Win | (France) Alizée Varlet | Trophée de l'Impact 2 | Pignans, France | Decision | 3 | 3:00 |
| 2024-05-24 | Win | (France) Lisiane Payet | La Nuit de la Boxe 5 | Ambarès-et-Lagrave, France | Decision | 3 | 3:00 |
| 2024-05-04 | Win | (Italy) Nicosia Giada | United Fight Night Corsica 1 | Ghisonaccia, France | Decision | 3 | 3:00 |
| 2024-03-01 | Win | (Romania) Liliana Amariței | United Fight Night 4 | Toulon, France | Decision | 3 | 3:00 |
Wins the vacant UFN (-52 kg) title.
| 2023-12-09 | Win | (Spain) Miriam Castano | Tendil Event V | L'Isle-sur-la-Sorgue, France | Decision | 3 | 3:00 |
A-class debut.
| 2023-05-19 | Win | (Italy) Kristel Ann Granita | United Fight Night | Le Beausset, France | Decision | 3 | 2:00 |
| 2021-07-10 | Loss | (France) Lyndsey Thomas | Le Choc des Etoiles 5 | Châteauneuf-les-Martigues, France | Decision (Unanimous) | 3 | 2:00 |
Legend: Win Loss Draw/No contest Notes

== See also ==
- List of female kickboxers
