= Ngora =

- Location in Uganda
- Coordinates: 01°27′27″N 33°46′35″E
- Country: Uganda
- Region: Eastern Region of Uganda
- Sub-region: Teso sub-region
- District: Ngora District
- Elevation: 3,600 ft (1,100 m)

Population (2020 Estimates)
  - Total: 17,700

Ngora is a town in the Eastern Region of Uganda. It is the main political, administrative, and commercial centre of Ngora District.

== Location ==
Ngora, which is located approximately 326 km (203.1 mi)from Kampala , Ngora is approximately 47 kilometres (29 mi), by road, southeast of Soroti, the largest city in the Teso sub-region. It is approximately 73 kilometres (45 mi), by road, northwest of Mbale, the largest city in Uganda's Eastern Region.

The nearest large town to Ngora, is Kumi Town, which is located about 18.2 kilometres (11 mi), directly east of Ngora Town. The coordinates of Ngora Town are 1°27'27.0"N, 33°46'35.0"E (Latitude:1.457500; Longitude:33.776389).

== Population ==
The population census in 2002 put Ngora town's population at 11,333. In April 2013, local authorities estimated the population to be 20,000. In 2014, the national population census put the population at 15,086.

In 2015, the Uganda Bureau of Statistics (UBOS) estimated the population of Ngora Town to be 15,500. In 2020, the population agency estimated the mid-year population of the town at 17,700 people. Of these, 9,000 (50.8 percent) were females and 8,700 (49.2 percent) were males. The UBOS calculated that the town's population increased at an average annual rate of 2.69 percent between 2015 and 2020.

== Points of interest ==
The following additional points of interest lie within the town limits or close to its edges:

1. The offices of Ngora Town Council

2. The offices of Ngora District Administration

3. Ngora Central Market

4. Ngora Freda Carr Hospital, a 180-bed, community, missionary hospital, affiliated with the Church of Uganda.

5. Nyero Rock Paintings are ancient paintings on rock surfaces, dating back to before 1250 AD. The site is located about 8 kilometres (5 mi) east of town, on the Ngora-Kumi Road.

== See also ==
- Teso people
- List of cities and towns in Uganda
