= Azza Attoura =

Syrian kickboxer

- Born: October 6, 1974 (age 52); Hama, Syria
- Nationality: Syrian
- Weight: 70 kg (154 lb; 11 st 0 lb)
- Division: Heavyweight

Azza Attoura is a Syrian female kickboxer. She is a world champion in kickboxing and Muay Thai with seven international awards. She was born on 6 October 1974 in the Syrian city of Hama.

== See also ==
- List of female kickboxers
