= Angélique Pitiot =

French kickboxer (born 1978)

- Born: 1978 (age 47–48); Bagnolet, France
- Nationality: French
- Height: 1.70 m (5 ft 7 in)
- Weight: 62.6 kg (138 lb; 9 st 12 lb)
- Division: Featherweight; Lightweight
- Style: Kickboxing
- Fighting out of: Bagnolet, France
- Team: Boxing Club Bagnolet
- Trainer: Sofiane Hallouache
- Years active: 2008–2015

Kickboxing record
- Total: 46
- Wins: 36
- Losses: 8
- Draws: 2

Other information
- Occupation: Muay thai coach

Angélique Pitiot (born 1978) is a French retired kickboxer and Nak Muay. She is the former ISKA Muay Thai and K-1 light-welterweight world champion, three time FFSCDA kickboxing and one time muay thai champion, and the WPMF European welterweight champion.

== Martial arts career ==
Prior to her transition to kickboxing she spent ten years playing basketball. At the advice of her brother, who at the time trained boxing, she began training kickboxing, and eventually muay thai. After three years, at the age of 30, Pitiot made her professional debut.

She won her first FFSCDA kickboxing title in April 2011, with a unanimous decision win over Saïda Atmani. After this Pitiot won her only FFSCDA Muay Thai title in May 2011, with a unanimous decision win over Sandra Sevilla.

During the Princes Du Ring event Pitiot faced Claire Haigh for the ISKA World K-1 light-welterweight title. Pitiot won the fight by a first-round knockout.

Turing to the amateur scene, Pitiot participated in the 2012 IFMA World championship, where she won the silver medal. Participating in the 2013 and 2015 WAKO World Championships, she won bronze medals in both iterations, and won silver at the 2014 WAKO European Championships.

In 2013 Pitiot won her second FFSCDA kickboxing title during FK-ONE, with a unanimous decision win over Cindy Perros. In her next fight she fought for her second ISKA world title, the light-welterweight Muay Thai belt, which she captured with a win over Anke Van Gestel. She then fought a rematch against Cindy Perros and won both the rematch, and her third FFSCDA kickboxing title, through a unanimous decision. Following this, Pitiot fought a rematch with Van Gestel during Les Princes de Salm 3. She won with a fifth round TKO.

== Championships and accomplishments ==
=== Amateur titles ===
- World Association of Kickboxing Organizations
  - (bronze) 2013 WAKO Senior World Championship 65 kg
  - (silver) 2014 WAKO Senior European Championship 65 kg
  - (bronze) 2015 WAKO Senior World Championship 65 kg
- International Federation of Muaythai Associations
  - (bronze) 2012 IFMA World Championship 63 kg

=== Professional titles ===
- International Sport Karate Association
  - ISKA World Light Welterweight Muay Thai Championship
  - ISKA World Light Welterweight K-1 Championship
- Fédération Française de Kick Boxing, Muaythaï et Disciplines Associées
  - FFSCDA Lightweight Kickboxing Championship (Three times)
  - FFSCDA Lightweight Muay Thai Championship (One time)
- World Professional Muaythai Federation
  - WPMF European Welterweight Championship

== Fight record ==
Professional Kickboxing Record
36 Wins, 8 Losses, 2 Draw, 0 No Contest
Date	Result	Opponent	Event	Location	Method	Round	Time
2015-04-25	Win	(France) Elsa Hemat	Final Fight 2	Évreux, Martinique	Decision (Unanimous)	3	3:00
2014-11-15	Win	(Belgium) Anke Van Gestel	Les Princes de Salm 3	Moyenmoutier, France	TKO	5	
2014-06-14	Win	(France) Cindy Perros	Choc Des Titans 5	Le Lamentin, Martinique	Decision (Unanimous)	3	3:00
For the FFSCDA Kickboxing title.
2013-05-04	Win	(Belgium) Anke Van Gestel	La Nuit des revanches	Bagnolet, France	Decision (Unanimous)	3	3:00
For the ISKA Muay Thai title.
2013-04-20	Win	(France) Cindy Perros	FK-ONE	Goussainville, France	Decision (Unanimous)	3	3:00
For the FFSCDA Kickboxing title.
2013-03-17	Win	(Italy) Chantal Ughi	World Muay Thai Festival 2013	Bangkok, Thailand	Decision (Unanimous)	3	3:00
2012-12-04	Win	(Thailand) Nong San	King's Birthday	Bangkok, Thailand	Decision (Unanimous)	3	3:00
2012-11-10	Win	(Netherlands) Claire Haigh	Princes Du Ring	Tours, France	KO	1	
For the ISKA World K-1 title.
2012-02-04	Loss	(France) Sandra Sevilla	Muay Thai International	Bordeaux, France	Decision (Unanimous)	3	3:00
2011-10-29	Draw	(Belgium) Zelda Tekin	Who's The Best 3	Charleroi, Belgium	Decision (Unanimous)	3	3:00
2011-09-02	Loss	(Peru) Valentina Shevchenko	Muaythai Premier League: First Round California	Long Beach, United States	Decision (Unanimous)	3	3:00
2011-05-28	Win	(France) Sandra Sevilla	4e Soirée de Boxe Thai	Montargis, France	Decision (Unanimous)	3	3:00
For the FFSCDA Muay Thai title.
2011-04-30	Win	(France) Saïda Atmani	Finales Championnat de France de Kick-Boxing	Paris, France	Decision (Unanimous)	3	3:00
For the FFSCDA Kickboxing title.
2011-02-12	Win	(France) Cynthia Moreau	La Nuit des Titans: Buakaw Vs Boughanem	Tours, France	Decision (Unanimous)	3	3:00
2010-11-01	Win	(Italy) Simona Di Chiera	Who's The Best 2	Charleroi, Belgium	Decision (Unanimous)	3	3:00
2010-05-29	Win	(France) Anne-Laure Gaudry	Le Nuit du Kick Boxing	Les Mureaux, France	Decision (Unanimous)	3	3:00
2010-03-20	Win	(France) Aurélie Froment	Championnat de France de Muaythai Classe A	Paris, France	Decision (Unanimous)	3	3:00
2010-03-06	Loss	(France) Stephanie Ielö Page	Gala de boxe thai de Milizac	Milizac, France	Decision (Unanimous)	3	3:00
2010-01-30	Win	(Italy) Chantal Ughi	La Nuit des Titans	Tours, France	Decision (Split)	5	3:00
For the WPMF European title.
2009-12-05	Win	(Thailand) Snooker Sorkorsungrueng	King's Birthday	Bangkok, Thailand	Decision (Unanimous)	3	3:00
2009-10-31	Win	(Belgium) VIDA	Who's The Best	Charleroi, Belgium	Decision (Unanimous)	3	3:00
2009-06-11	Loss	(France) Laetitia Lambert	Championnat de France de Muaythai Classe A	Paris, France	Decision (Unanimous)	3	3:00
2008-12-23	Win	(Thailand)	Rangsit Stadium	Bangkok, Thailand	Decision (Unanimous)	3	3:00
2006-05-13	Win	(France) Fanny Garcia	Muay Thai Fury	Bordeaux, France	Decision (Unanimous)	3	3:00
Legend: Win Loss Draw/No contest Notes

== See also ==
- List of female kickboxers
