= Geraldine O'Callaghan =

English kickboxer

- Born: Ramsgate, England, United Kingdom
- Other names: Geri
- Nationality: British
- Style: Muay Thai

Kickboxing record
- Total: 41
- Wins: 30
- By knockout: 4
- Losses: 10
- Draws: 1

Geraldine O'Callaghan is a female kickboxer and World Muaythai Council title holder. O'Callaghan has fought 30 times and lost 10 times.
