= Merchtem =

- Municipality
- Flag Coat of arms

- Location of Merchtem in Flemish Brabant
- Interactive map of Merchtem
- Location in Belgium
- Coordinates: 50°58′N 04°14′E
- Country: Belgium
- Community: Flemish Community
- Region: Flemish Region
- Province: Flemish Brabant
- Arrondissement: Halle-Vilvoorde

Government
  - Mayor: Maarten Mast (Lijst1785)
  - Governing party: Lijst1785, CD&V PLUS

Area
  - Total: 36.9 km^{2} (14.2 sq mi)

Population (2018-01-01)
  - Total: 16,294
  - Density: 442/km^{2} (1,140/sq mi)
- Postal codes: 1785
- NIS code: 23052
- Area codes: 052, 02
- Website: www.merchtem.be

Merchtem (pronounced [ˈmɛr(ə)xtɛm]) is a municipality located in the Belgian province of Flemish Brabant. The municipality comprises the villages of Brussegem and Hamme, the hamlets of Ossel and Peizegem, and Merchtem proper. On July 9, 2009, Merchtem had a total population of 15,298. The total area is 36.72 km^{2} which gives a population density of 416 inhabitants per km^{2}.

== Folklore ==
Merchtem is known for 'de steltenlopers', people walking on stilts (up to several meters above ground). Langevelde, a part of the municipality, was frequently flooded after heavy rain. In order to reach the centre, people were using sticks to walk. After an internal struggle, the group split up in two parts, 'stichting Langevelde' and 'stichting Jan Vaderhasselt'.

== Language controversy ==
On August 28, 2006 mayor Eddie de Block introduced a ban on speaking French in the town's schools. Mayor de Block said that the measure did not violate human rights and that it would help integration. A previous ban on signs in languages different from Dutch in the town's markets had been overturned by Flemish Interior Minister Marino Keulen.

== Places of interest ==
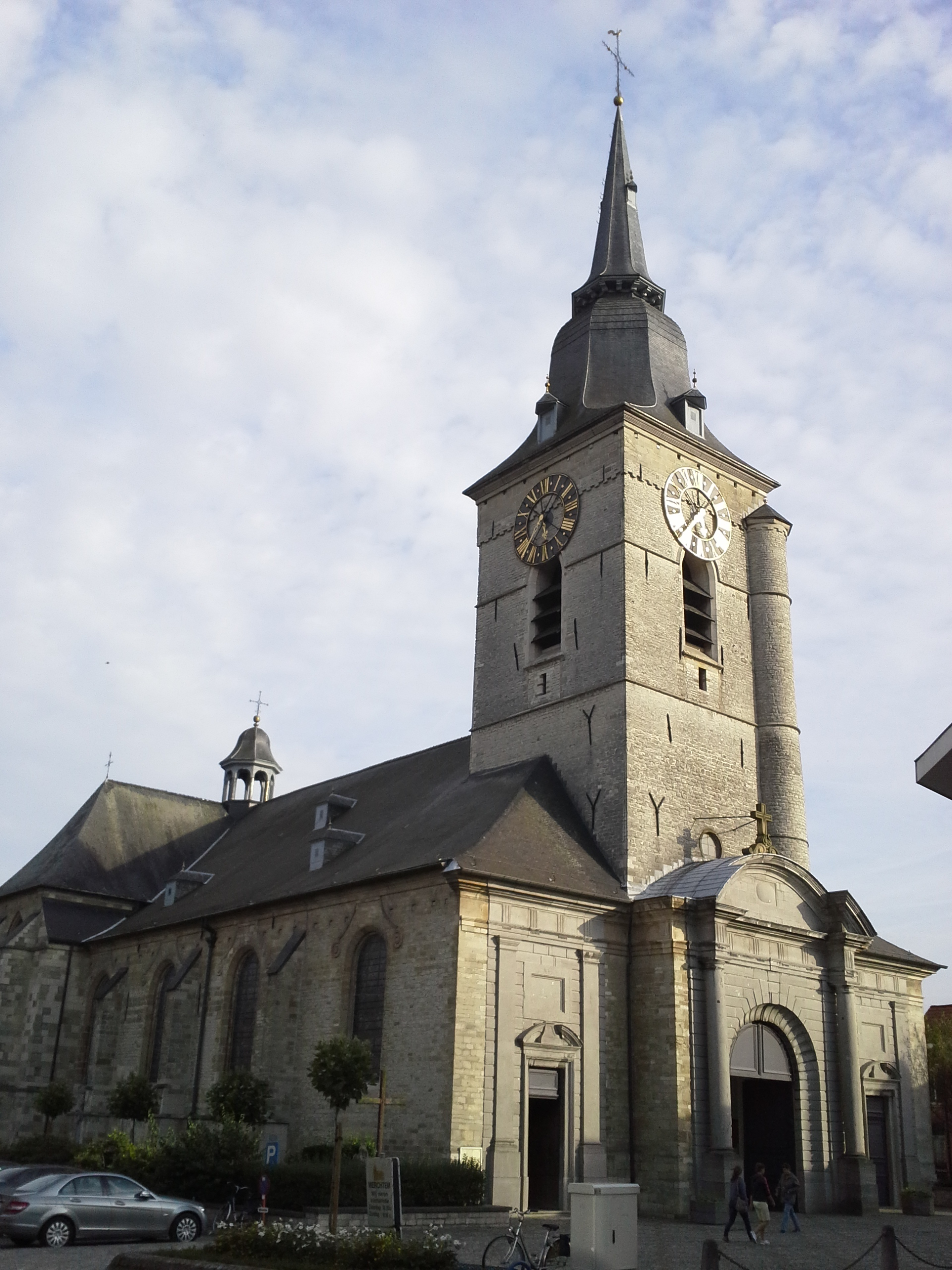
Onze-Lieve-Vrouw church

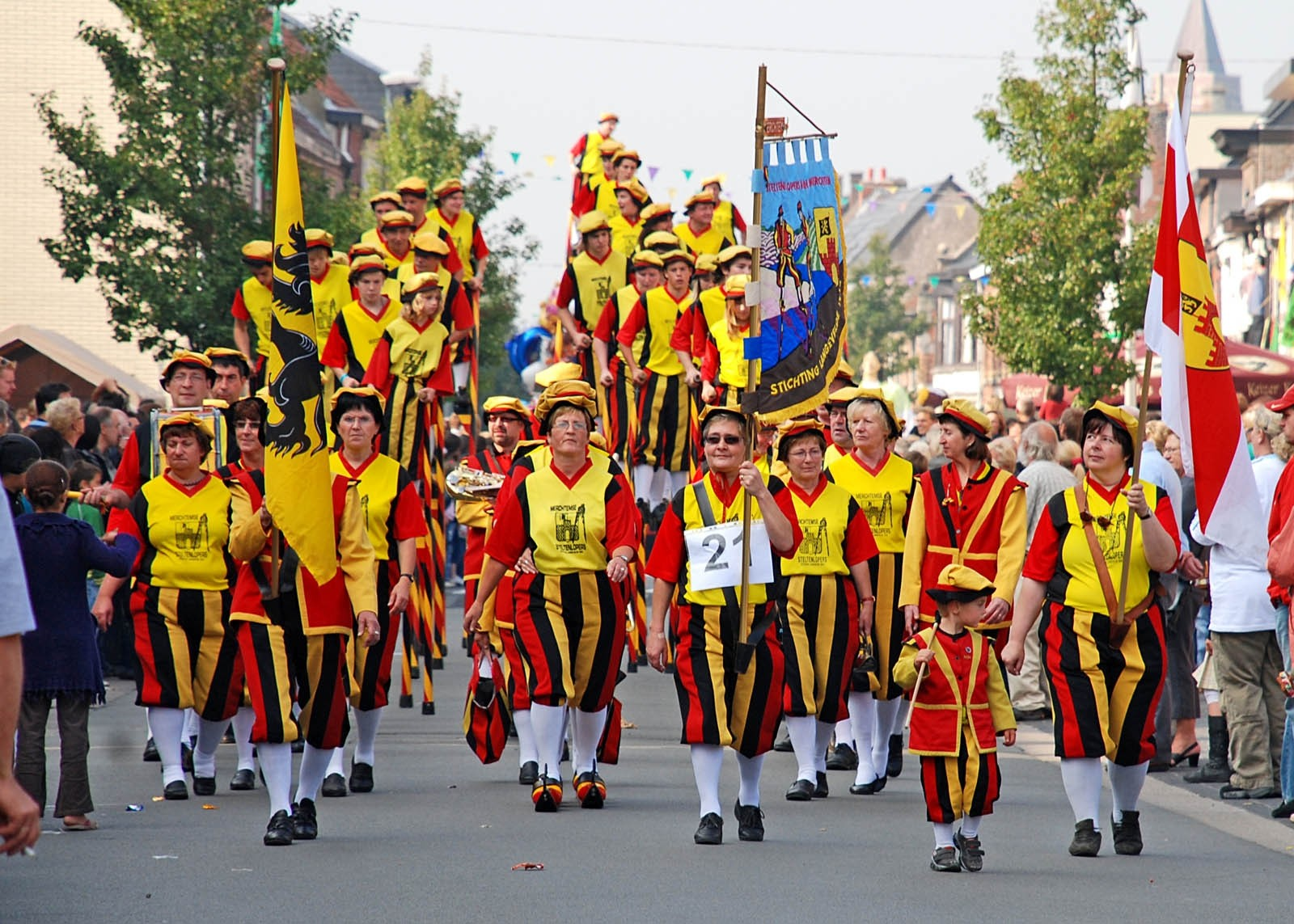
Steltenlopers

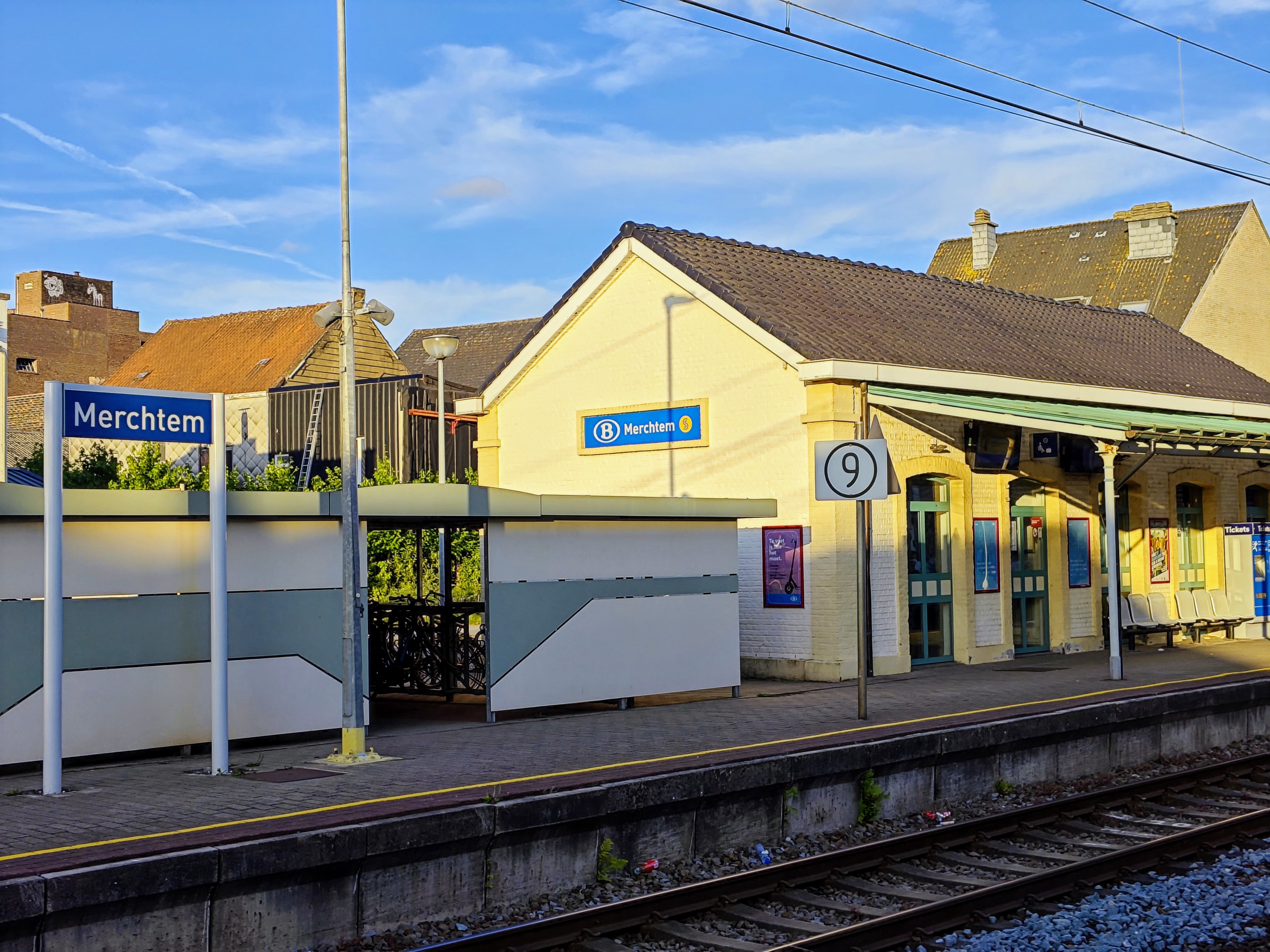
Merchtem station
