= Puenkon Tor.Surat =

Thai Muay Thai fighter

- Born: Weerapong Unlamai; January 30, 1997 (age 29); Rayong, Thailand
- Nationality: Thai
- Height: 164 cm (5 ft 5 in)
- Weight: 54 kg (119 lb; 8.5 st)
- Fighting out of: Rayong, Thailand
- Team: Tor.Surat
- Trainer: Teva Tor.Surat

Puenkon Tor.Surat (Thai: ปืนกล ต.สุรัตน์) is a Thai Muay Thai fighter.

== Biography and career ==
In October 2025, Puenkon was arrested by Thailand’s cyber police for running an illegal gambling site that made over ฿100M (US$2.7M) in 3 years.

== Titles and accomplishments ==
- Rajadamnern Stadium
  - 2016 Rajadamnern Stadium 115 lbs Champion
  - 2016 Rajadamnern Stadium Fighter of the Year

Awards

- 2016 Sports Authority of Thailand Fighter of the Year
- 2016 Siam Kela Fighter of the Year

== Fight record ==
Muay Thai Record
Date	Result	Opponent	Event	Location	Method	Round	Time
2022-05-26	Loss	(Thailand) Petchthailand Mor.Rajabhatsurin	Petchyindee, Rajadamnern Stadium	Bangkok, Thailand	Decision	5	3:00
2022-04-21	Loss	(Thailand) Petchsila Wor.Auracha	Petchyindee, Rajadamnern Stadium	Bangkok, Thailand	Decision	5	3:00
2022-01-21	Loss	(Thailand) Kumandoi PetchyindeeAcademy	Petchyindee, Rangsit Stadium	Rangsit, Thailand	Decision	5	3:00
2021-04-08	Loss	(Thailand) Saoek Sitchefboontham	SuekMahakamMuayRuamPonKon Chana + Petchyindee	Songkhla province, Thailand	Decision	5	3:00
2021-03-13	Win	(Thailand) Diesellek Wor.Wanchai	Majujaya Muay Thai, Temporary Outdoors Stadium	Pattani, Thailand	Decision	5	3:00
2020-12-11	Win	(Thailand) Saotho Sitchefboontham	True4U Muaymanwansuk, Rangsit Stadium	Rangsit, Thailand	Decision	5	3:00
2020-11-06	Win	(Thailand) Rungnarai Kiatmuu9	True4U Muaymanwansuk, Rangsit Stadium	Rangsit, Thailand	KO (Elbow)	4	1:45
2020-10-09	Win	(Thailand) Phetsommai Sor.Sommai	True4U Muaymanwansuk, Rangsit Stadium	Rangsit, Thailand	Decision	5	3:00
2020-09-04	Win	(Thailand) Yodpot Nor.AnuwatGym	True4U Muaymanwansuk, Rangsit Stadium	Rangsit, Thailand	Decision	5	3:00
2020-07-24	Loss	(Thailand) Rungnarai Kiatmuu9	True4U Muaymanwansuk, Rangsit Stadium	Rangsit, Thailand	Decision	5	3:00
2020-03-05	Loss	(Thailand) Kongchai Chanaidonmuang	Rajadamnern Stadium	Bangkok, Thailand	Decision	5	3:00
2020-01-30	Win	(Thailand) Petchhuahin Por.Petchkaikaew	Rajadamnern Stadium	Bangkok, Thailand	Decision	5	3:00
2019-12-12	Loss	(Thailand) Kumandoi Petcharoenvit	Rajadamnern Stadium	Bangkok, Thailand	Decision	5	3:00
2019-10-17	Win	(Thailand) Phetsuphan Por.Daorungruang	Rajadamnern Stadium	Bangkok, Thailand	Decision	5	3:00
2019-08-29	Loss	(Thailand) Kumandoi Petcharoenvit	Rajadamnern Stadium	Bangkok, Thailand	Decision	5	3:00
2019-05-29	Loss	(Thailand) Wanchalong PK.Saenchai	Singmawin Rajadamnern Stadium	Bangkok, Thailand	KO (Left high kick)	4	
2019-01-24	Win	(Thailand) Kumandoi Petcharoenvit	Rajadamnern Stadium	Bangkok, Thailand	Decision	5	3:00
2018-12-06	Loss	(Thailand) Phetsuphan Por.Daorungruang	Rajadamnern Stadium	Bangkok, Thailand	Decision	5	3:00
2018-10-25	Loss	(Thailand) Diesellek Wor.Wanchai	Rajadamnern Stadium	Bangkok, Thailand	Decision	5	3:00
For a 1.3 million baht side-bet.
2018-07-26	Loss	(Thailand) Yothin FA Group	Rajadamnern Stadium	Bangkok, Thailand	Decision	5	3:00
2018-06-06	Win	(Thailand) Pichitchai PKsaenchaimuaythaigym	Rajadamnern Stadium	Bangkok, Thailand	Decision	5	3:00
2017-11-28	Loss	(Thailand) Kompatak SinbiMuayThai	Lumpinee Stadium	Bangkok, Thailand	KO (High Kick)	1	
2017-11-05	Win	(Thailand) Pichitchai PKsaenchaimuaythaigym	Rajadamnern Stadium	Bangkok, Thailand	Decision	5	3:00
2017-07-13	Win	(Thailand) Kumandoi Petcharoenvit	Rajadamnern Stadium	Bangkok, Thailand	KO	3	
2017-06-07	Loss	(Thailand) Wanchalong PK.Saenchai	Rajadamnern Stadium	Bangkok, Thailand	Decision	5	3:00
2017-05-03	Win	(Thailand) Kumandoi Petcharoenvit	Rajadamnern Stadium	Bangkok, Thailand	Decision	5	3:00
2017-03-30	Loss	(Thailand) Prajanchai P.K.Saenchaimuaythaigym	Rajadamnern Stadium	Bangkok, Thailand	Decision	5	3:00
2017-02-08	Win	(Thailand) Prajanchai P.K.Saenchaimuaythaigym	Rajadamnern Stadium	Bangkok, Thailand	Decision	5	3:00
2016-12-21	Win	(Thailand) Gingsanglek Tor.Laksong	Rajadamnern Stadium	Bangkok, Thailand	KO (Left Knee to the Body)	4	
Defends the Rajadamnern Stadium 115 lbs title.
2016-11-30	Win	(Thailand) Kumandoi Petcharoenvit	Rajadamnern Stadium	Bangkok, Thailand	Decision	5	3:00
2016-10-13	Win	(Thailand) Gingsanglek Tor.Laksong	Rajadamnern Stadium	Bangkok, Thailand	Decision	5	3:00
2016-09-14	Win	(Thailand) Pichitchai PKsaenchaimuaythaigym	Rajadamnern Stadium	Bangkok, Thailand	Decision	5	3:00
2016-07-21	Win	(Thailand) Pichitchai PKsaenchaimuaythaigym	Rajadamnern Stadium	Bangkok, Thailand	Decision	5	3:00
2016-06-09	Win	(Thailand) Prajanban Sor.Jor.Wichitmuangpadrew	Rajadamnern Stadium	Bangkok, Thailand	Decision	5	3:00
Wins the Rajadamnern Stadium 115 lbs title.
2016-05-04	Win	(Thailand) Roychueng Singmawin	Rajadamnern Stadium	Bangkok, Thailand	Decision	5	3:00
2016-04-06	Win	(Thailand) Suriyanlek Aor.Bor.Tor. Kampee	Rajadamnern Stadium	Bangkok, Thailand	Decision	5	3:00
2016-03-03	Win	(Thailand) Phetmuangchon Por.Suantong	Rajadamnern Stadium	Bangkok, Thailand	Decision	5	3:00
2016-01-27	Win	(Thailand) Phetmuangchon Por.Suantong	Rajadamnern Stadium	Bangkok, Thailand	Decision	5	3:00
2015-12-28	Win	(Thailand) Phethevada BSJ.Sungnern	Rajadamnern Stadium	Bangkok, Thailand	KO	5	
2015-10-31	Win	(Thailand) Yodpadang TBM Gym	Montri Studio	Bangkok, Thailand	KO	2	
2014-10-24	Loss	(Thailand) Yodasawin Phor.Boonsit	Rajadamnern Stadium	Bangkok, Thailand	Decision	5	3:00
2014-09-20	Win	(Thailand) Lamnamoonlek Nuikafeboran	Omnoi Stadium	Bangkok, Thailand	Decision	5	3:00
2014-08-18	Loss	(Thailand) Petchsuntree Jitmuangnon	Rajadamnern Stadium	Bangkok, Thailand	Decision	5	3:00
2013-07-16	Win	(Thailand) Detkart Por Pongsawang	Rajadamnern Stadium	Bangkok, Thailand	KO (Low Kick)	2	
2013-05-02	Loss	(Thailand) Rodtang Jitmuangnon	Thepprasit Stadium	Pattaya, Thailand	Decision	5	3:00
2011-04-14	Win	(Thailand) Petchlamsin Kiatponthip	Rajadamnern Stadium	Bangkok, Thailand	Decision	5	3:00
2011-02-21	Loss	(Thailand) Panpayak Jitmuangnon	Rajadamnern Stadium	Bangkok, Thailand	Decision	5	3:00
Legend: Win Loss Draw/No contest Notes
