= Phetmuangchon Por.Suantong =

Thai Muay Thai fighter

- Born: May 1, 1993 (age 33); Mueang Buriram District, Thailand
- Other names: Yodbuapetch Tigermuaythai; Petmuangchon Sor Tartsart; Petmuangchon Ekbangsai
- Nationality: Thai
- Height: 160 cm (5 ft 3 in)
- Weight: 51 kg (112 lb; 8.0 st)
- Fighting out of: Bangkok, Thailand
- Team: Por Suanthong; Tiger Muay Thai (former)

Phetmuangchon Por.Suantong (เพชรเมืองชล ภ.สวนทอง) is a Thai Muay Thai fighter.

== Career ==
Phetmuangchon retired in 2018 to become a Muay Thai instructor at Evolve MMA in Singapore. Phetmuangchon has since moved to Pineapple MMA in Singapore, where he now actively coaches and fights out of. Phetmuangchon made his comeback to Muay Thai on Petchyindee's Muaymumwansuk show at Rangsit Stadium on December 18, 2020. He won by decision against Pirapat Muayded789.

== Titles and accomplishments ==
- S1 105 lbs Champion
- 2013 Rajadamnern Stadium 105 lbs Champion
- 2014 Rajadamnern Stadium 108 lbs Champion
- 2015 Omnoi Stadium 112 lbs Champion
- 2017 Sports Authority of Thailand Fighter of the Year

== Fight record ==
Muay Thai Record
Date	Result	Opponent	Event	Location	Method	Round	Time
2024-03-28	Win	(Thailand) Suriya NichaMuaythaiGym	WMC Pro Series 4	Singapore	TKO		
2021-04-04	Loss	(Thailand) Ngaopayak OrBorTor.Nonthong	MuayDee VitheeThai, Blue Arena	Samut Prakan, Thailand	Decision	5	3:00
2020-12-18	Win	(Thailand) Pirapat Muayded789	True4u Muaymumwansuk, Rangsit Stadium	Rangsit, Thailand	Decision	5	3:00
2018-05-09	Loss	(Thailand) Rungnarai Kiatmuu9	Rajadamnern Stadium	Bangkok, Thailand	Decision	5	3:00
2018-03-07	Win	(Thailand) Sam-D Petchyindee Academy	Rajadamnern Stadium	Bangkok, Thailand	Decision	5	3:00
2018-01-31	Loss	(Thailand) Palangpon PetchyindeeAcademy	Rajadamnern Stadium	Bangkok, Thailand	Decision	5	3:00
2018-01-07	Draw	(Thailand) Priewpak Sor.Jor.Vichitpaedriw	Blue Arena	Samut Prakan, Thailand	Decision	5	3:00
For the Blue Arena Flyweight title.
2017-11-16	Win	(Thailand) Rungnarai Kiatmuu9	Rajadamnern Stadium	Bangkok, Thailand	Decision	5	3:00
2017-09-29	Win	(Thailand) Sam-D Petchyindee Academy	Lumpinee Stadium	Bangkok, Thailand	Decision	5	3:00
2017-09-06	Win	(Thailand) Sarawut Sor.Jor.Vichitpaedriw	Rajadamnern Stadium	Bangkok, Thailand	Decision	5	3:00
2017-08-03	Win	(Thailand) Rungnarai Kiatmuu9	Rajadamnern Stadium	Bangkok, Thailand	Decision	5	3:00
2017-06-29	Win	(Thailand) Sarawut Sor.Jor.Vichitpaedriw	Rajadamnern Stadium	Bangkok, Thailand	Decision	5	3:00
2017-06-01	Win	(Thailand) Ngao-Payak OrBorTor.Nonthong	Rajadamnern Stadium	Bangkok, Thailand	Decision	5	3:00
2017-03-25	Win	(Thailand) Phetsuphan Por.Daorungruang	Montri Studio	Bangkok, Thailand	KO	3	
2017-02-19	Win	(Thailand) Sueayai Chor.Hapayak	Rangsit Stadium	Rangsit, Thailand	TKO	4	
2017-01-09	Win	(Thailand) Priewpak Sor.Jor.Vichitpaedriw	Rajadamnern Stadium	Bangkok, Thailand	Decision	5	3:00
2016-12-21	Draw	(Thailand) Priewpak Sor.Jor.Vichitpaedriw	Rajadamnern Stadium	Bangkok, Thailand	Decision	5	3:00
2016-11-19	Loss	(Thailand) Phetniyom F.A.Group	Montri Studio	Bangkok, Thailand	Decision	5	3:00
2016-10-22	Win	(France) Hakim Hamech	La Nuit Des Challenges 16	France	Decision	3	3:00
2016-10-13	Draw	(Thailand) Phetniyom F.A.Group	Rajadamnern Stadium	Bangkok, Thailand	Decision	5	3:00
2016-09-14	Loss	(Thailand) Gingsanglek Tor.Laksong	Rajadamnern Stadium	Bangkok, Thailand	Decision	5	3:00
2016-08-04	Win	(Thailand) Gingsanglek Tor.Laksong	Rajadamnern Stadium	Bangkok, Thailand	Decision	5	3:00
2016-06-19	Win	(Japan) Kaito Wor.Wanchai	Wanchai+Kingthong MuayThai Super Fight	Nagoya, Japan	Decision	5	3:00
2016-05-26	Win	(Thailand) Kiewpayak Jitmuangnon	Rajadamnern Stadium	Bangkok, Thailand	Decision	5	3:00
2016-04-30	Win	(Thailand) Singhaudorn Audaudorn	Omnoi Stadium	Samut Sakhon, Thailand	Decision	5	3:00
2016-03-31	Win	(Thailand) Phetsuphan Por.Daorungruang	Rajadamnern Stadium	Bangkok, Thailand	Decision	5	3:00
2016-03-03	Loss	(Thailand) Puenkon Tor.Surat	Rajadamnern Stadium	Bangkok, Thailand	Decision	5	3:00
2016-01-27	Loss	(Thailand) Puenkon Tor.Surat	Rajadamnern Stadium	Bangkok, Thailand	Decision	5	3:00
2015-12-02	Win	(Thailand) Kwandom Phetsimean	Rajadamnern Stadium	Bangkok, Thailand	Decision	5	3:00
2015-10-11	Loss	(Thailand) Suriyanlek Aor.Bor.Tor.Kampee	Rajadamnern Stadium	Bangkok, Thailand	Decision	5	3:00
2015-08-13	Loss	(Thailand) Phetthanakit JSP	Rajadamnern Stadium	Bangkok, Thailand	Decision	5	3:00
2015-07-22	Win	(Thailand) Ngaopayak OrBorTor.Nonthong	Rajadamnern Stadium	Bangkok, Thailand	Decision	5	3:00
2015-05-07	Loss	(Thailand) Kwandom Phetsimean	Rajadamnern Stadium	Bangkok, Thailand	Decision	5	3:00
Loses the Rajadamnern Stadium 108 lbs title.
2015-03-28	Win	(Thailand) Han Sor.Sakkarin	Omnoi Stadium	Samut Sakhon, Thailand	Decision	5	3:00
Wins the Omnoi Stadium 112 lbs title.
2014-12-31	Win	(Thailand) Phetsuphan Por.Daorungruang	Rajadamnern Stadium	Bangkok, Thailand	Decision	5	3:00
2014-11-03	Loss	(Thailand) Wanpichit Meenayothin	Rajadamnern Stadium	Bangkok, Thailand	KO	4	
2014-09-24	Loss	(Thailand) Chaimongkol Sujeebahmeekeaw	Rajadamnern Stadium	Bangkok, Thailand	Decision	5	3:00
2014-08-14	Win	(Thailand) Kumandoi Sor.Jitpakdee	Rajadamnern Stadium	Bangkok, Thailand	Decision	5	3:00
Wins the Rajadamnern Stadium 108 lbs title.
2014-06-17	Loss	(Thailand) Wanpichit Meenayothin	Rajadamnern Stadium	Bangkok, Thailand	Decision	5	3:00
2013-12-06	Win	(Thailand) Sanchai Tor.Laksong	Suwit Stadium	Phuket, Thailand	Decision	5	3:00
2013-10-24	Loss	(Thailand) Oley Sitniwat	Rajadamnern Stadium	Bangkok, Thailand	Decision	5	3:00
2013-09-11	Loss	(Thailand) Detkart Por Pongsawang	Rajadamnern Stadium	Bangkok, Thailand	Decision	5	3:00
2013-08-05	Win	(Thailand) Sanchai Tor.Laksong	Rajadamnern Stadium	Bangkok, Thailand	Decision	5	3:00
Wins the Rajadamnern Stadium 105 lbs title.
2013-06-03	Win	(Thailand) Kumandoi Sor.Jitpakdee	Rajadamnern Stadium	Bangkok, Thailand	Decision	5	3:00
2013-03-11	Loss	(Thailand) Det Sor Ploenchit	Rajadamnern Stadium	Bangkok, Thailand	Decision	5	3:00
2013-02-07	Loss	(Thailand) Ploysiam PetchyindeeAcademy	Rajadamnern Stadium	Bangkok, Thailand	Decision	5	3:00
2012-12-18	Loss	(Thailand) Satanmuanglek CP Freshmart	Lumpinee Stadium	Bangkok, Thailand	KO (Left elbow)		
2012-11-12	Win	(Thailand) Yodsaenchai Sor.Jor.Toipadriew	Rajadamnern Stadium	Bangkok, Thailand	KO (Right Elbow)	3	
2012-10-19	Win	(Thailand) Wanpichit Meenayothin	Rajadamnern Stadium	Bangkok, Thailand	KO (Left Elbow)	2	
2012-07-12	Win	(Thailand) Satanmuanglek CP Freshmart	Rajadamnern Stadium	Bangkok, Thailand	Decision	5	3:00
2011-07-29	Win	(Thailand) Maneedang Kiatbanpho	Lumpinee Stadium	Bangkok, Thailand	KO	4	
2011-07-08	Win	(Thailand)	Bangla Stadium	Phuket, Thailand	KO (Low Kicks)	2	
2011-01-01	Loss	(Thailand) Phetsiam Lookklongtun	Omnoi Stadium	Samut Sakhon, Thailand	Decision	5	3:00
For the Omnoi Stadium 100 lbs title.
Legend: Win Loss Draw/No contest Notes
