= Rungnarai Kiatmuu9 =

Thai Muay Thai fighter (born 1995)

- Born: Worawut Kotprakhon; May 17, 1995 (age 31); Prakhon Chai, Thailand
- Other names: Rungnarai Mor Rattanabandit; Rungnarai Kiatmuukao
- Height: 166 cm (5 ft 5 in)
- Division: Light Flyweight; Flyweight; Super Flyweight; Bantamweight
- Style: Muay Thai (Muay Femur)
- Stance: Orthodox
- Fighting out of: Bangkok, Thailand
- Team: Kiatmuu9
- Trainer: Chetcha Kiatmuu9
- Years active: c. 2003-present

Kickboxing record
- Total: 158
- Wins: 119
- By knockout: 20
- Losses: 34
- Draws: 5

Other information
- Notable relatives: Panomroonglek Kratingdaenggym (Uncle)

Worawut Kotprakhon (born May 17, 1995), known professionally as Rungnarai Kiatmuu9 (Thai: รุ้งนารายณ์ เกียรติหมู่ 9), is a Thai Muay Thai fighter. He is a former Lumpinee Stadium champion and Rajadamnern Stadium champion.

== Biography and career ==
Rungnarai started Muay Thai at 8 years old in a small camp called Lukhokphet near his village. At 14 he went to live at the Kiatmoo9 gym.

In July 2019 Rungnarai received the 2018 Sports Writers Association of Thailand Fighter of the Year Award but lost by knockout shortly after to Yothin FA Group, which led the Association to strip him of his title and decide that no fighters were worthy of it that year. This decision was highly controversial in the Muay Thai community.

== Titles and accomplishment ==
- Professional Boxing Association of Thailand (PAT)
  - 2013 Thailand Light Flyweight (108 lbs) Champion
- Rajadamnern Stadium
  - 2016 Rajadamnern Stadium Light Flyweight (108 lbs) Champion
- Lumpinee Stadium
  - 2018 Lumpinee Stadium Super Flyweight (115 lbs) Champion (1 defense)
- True4U
  - 2017 True4U Flyweight (112 lbs) Champion
  - 2019 True4U Bantamweight (118 lbs) Champion

Awards

- 2018 Sports Writers Association of Thailand Fighter of the Year (revoked)

== Fight record ==
Muay Thai record
119 wins, 34 losses, 5 draws
Date	Result	Opponent	Event	Location	Method	Round	Time
2026-10-18	Win	(Thailand) Den Sitnayoktaweeptaphong	ONE Friday Fights 154, Lumpinee Stadium	Bangkok, Thailand	Decision (unanimous)	3	3:00
2024-10-18	Loss	(Spain) Mikel Fernández	ONE Friday Fights 83, Lumpinee Stadium	Bangkok, Thailand	DQ (kick to a downed opponent)	1	
2020-11-06	Loss	(Thailand) Puenkon Tor.Surat	True4U Muaymanwansuk, Rangsit Stadium	Rangsit, Thailand	KO (elbow)	4	1:45
2020-09-11	Loss	(Thailand) Satanmuanglek PetchyindeeAcademy	True4U Muaymanwansuk, Rangsit Stadium	Rangsit, Thailand	Decision (unanimous)	5	3:00
For the vacant WMO World Flyweight (112 lbs) title.
2020-07-24	Win	(Thailand) Puenkon Tor.Surat	True4U Muaymanwansuk, Rangsit Stadium	Rangsit, Thailand	Decision	5	3:00
2020-02-26	Win	(Thailand) Chanalert Meenayothin	Rajadamnern Stadium	Bangkok, Thailand	Decision	5	3:00
2020-01-31	Win	(Thailand) Phetsommai Sor.Sommai	Phuket Super Fight Real Muay Thai	Mueang Phuket District, Thailand	Decision	5	3:00
2019-12-13	Loss	(Thailand) Chanalert Meenayothin	Lumpinee Stadium	Bangkok, Thailand	Decision (split)	5	3:00
Lost the Lumpinee Stadium Super Flyweight (115 lbs) title.
2019-10-06	Loss	(Japan) Kaito Wor.Wanchai	Suk Wanchai MuayThai Super Fight vol.6	Nagoya, Japan	KO (body shot)	3	
Lost the True4u Bantamweight (118 lbs) title.
2019-08-09	Win	(Thailand) Phetsommai Sor.Sommai	Lumpinee Stadium	Bangkok, Thailand	Decision	5	3:00
Defends the Lumpinee Stadium Super Flyweight (115 lbs) title.
2019-07-05	Loss	(Thailand) Yothin FA Group	Muaymanwansuk + Petchpiya Lumpinee Stadium	Bangkok, Thailand	KO (right elbow)	3	
2019-06-07	Win	(Thailand) Diesellek Wor.Wanchai	Muaymanwansuk + Petchpiya Lumpinee Stadium	Bangkok, Thailand	Decision	5	3:00
Wins the True4U Bantamweight (118 lbs) title.
2019-05-09	Win	(Thailand) Dansiam Khrudamgym	Rajadamnern Stadium	Bangkok, Thailand	Decision	5	3:00
2019-02-21	Loss	(Thailand) Detchaiya PetchyindeeAcademy	Rajadamnern Stadium	Thailand	KO (left hook)	2	2:50
2019-01-17	Win	(Thailand) Detchaiya PetchyindeeAcademy	Rajadamnern Stadium	Thailand	Decision	5	3:00
2018-12-07	Win	(Thailand) Jomhod Eminentair	Lumpinee Stadium	Bangkok, Thailand	Decision	5	3:00
Wins the vacant Lumpinee Stadium Super Flyweight (115 lbs) title.
2018-10-05	Win	(Thailand) Watcharapon P.K.Saenchaimuaythaigym	Muay Thai Expo: The Legend of Muay Thai	Buriram, Thailand	Decision	5	3:00
2018-09-04	Draw	(Thailand) Phetphuthai Sitsarawatseua	Lumpinee Stadium	Bangkok, Thailand	Decision	5	3:00
2018-08-07	Win	(Thailand) Kiew Parunchai	Lumpinee Stadium	Bangkok, Thailand	Decision	5	3:00
2018-07-05	Win	(Thailand) Phetsuphan Por.Daorungruang	Rajadamnern Stadium	Bangkok, Thailand	Decision	5	3:00
2018-06-11	Win	(Thailand) Palangpon PetchyindeeAcademy	Rajadamnern Stadium	Bangkok, Thailand	Decision	5	3:00
2018-05-09	Win	(Thailand) Phetmuangchon Por.Suantong	Rajadamnern Stadium	Bangkok, Thailand	Decision	5	3:00
2018-04-09	Win	(Thailand) Achanai PetchyindeeAcademy	Rajadamnern Stadium	Bangkok, Thailand	Decision	5	3:00
2018-03-07	Win	(Thailand) Kimluay Santiaubol	Rajadamnern Stadium	Bangkok, Thailand	Decision	5	3:00
2018-01-31	Loss	(Thailand) Achanai PetchyindeeAcademy	Rajadamnern Stadium	Bangkok, Thailand	Decision	5	3:00
2017-12-22	Win	(Thailand) Palangpon PetchyindeeAcademy	True4U Muaymanwansuk	Saraburi Province, Thailand	Decision	5	3:00
Wins the True4U Flyweight (112 lbs) title.
2017-11-16	Loss	(Thailand) Phetmuangchon Por.Suantong	Rajadamnern Stadium	Bangkok, Thailand	Decision	5	3:00
2017-10-15	Loss	(England) Daniel McGowan	YOKKAO 28	Bolton, England	KO (left hook)	3	2:05
2017-08-03	Loss	(Thailand) Phetmuangchon Por.Suantong	Rajadamnern Stadium	Bangkok, Thailand	Decision	5	3:00
2017-06-05	Win	(Thailand) Saoek Kesagym	Rajadamnern Stadium	Bangkok, Thailand	Decision	5	3:00
2017-05-04	Win	(Thailand) Palangpon PetchyindeeAcademy	Rajadamnern Stadium	Bangkok, Thailand	Decision	5	3:00
2017-04-07	Win	(Thailand) Nongyot Sitjakan	Lumpinee Stadium	Bangkok, Thailand	Decision	5	3:00
2017-03-08	Loss	(Thailand) Sarawut Sor.Jor.Toypadriw	Rajadamnern Stadium	Bangkok, Thailand	Decision	5	3:00
2017-02-04	Win	(Thailand) Palangpon PetchyindeeAcademy		Isan, Thailand	Decision	5	3:00
2016-12-28	Win	(Thailand) Sarawut Sor.Jor.Toypadriw	Rajadamnern Stadium	Bangkok, Thailand	Decision	5	3:00
2016-11-22	Win	(Thailand) Banlangnoen Suwasangmancha	Lumpinee Stadium	Bangkok, Thailand	Decision	5	3:00
2016-09-23	Win	(Thailand) Priewpark Sor.Jor.Vichitpedriew	Lumpinee Stadium	Bangkok, Thailand	Decision	5	3:00
2016-09-02	Loss	(Thailand) Ongree Sor.Dechaphan	Lumpinee Stadium	Bangkok, Thailand	Decision	5	3:00
2016-07-27	Loss	(Thailand) Sarawut Sor.Jor.Toypadriw	Rajadamnern Stadium	Bangkok, Thailand	Decision	5	3:00
2016-06-20	Loss	(Thailand) Nongyot Sitjakan	Rajadamnern Stadium	Bangkok, Thailand	Decision	5	3:00
2016-05-09	Win	(Thailand) Satanmuanglek Numpornthep	Rajadamnern Stadium	Bangkok, Thailand	KO (right high kick)	3	
Wins the Rajadamnern Stadium Light Flyweight (108 lbs) title.
2016-03-22	Win	(Thailand) Thanadet Thor.Pran49	Lumpinee Stadium	Bangkok, Thailand	Decision	5	3:00
2016-02-29	Draw	(Thailand) Nongyot Sitjakan	Rajadamnern Stadium	Bangkok, Thailand	Decision	5	3:00
2016-02-04	Win	(Thailand) Yokmorakot Parethongchareonyon	Rajadamnern Stadium	Bangkok, Thailand	Decision	5	3:00
2015-12-27	Win	(Thailand) Detkart Por.Pongsawang	Siam Omnoi Stadium	Bangkok, Thailand	KO	3	
2015-12-08	Draw	(Thailand) Achanai PetchyindeeAcademy	Lumpinee Stadium	Bangkok, Thailand	Decision	5	3:00
2015-11-09	Loss	(Thailand) Palangpon PetchyindeeAcademy	Rajadamnern Stadium	Bangkok, Thailand	Decision	5	3:00
2015-10-09	Loss	(Thailand) Ronachai Tor.Ramintra	Lumpinee Stadium	Bangkok, Thailand	Decision	5	3:00
2015-09-15	Win	(Thailand) Nongyot Sitjakan	Lumpinee Stadium	Bangkok, Thailand	Decision	5	3:00
2015-08-11	Win	(Thailand) Satanmuanglek Numpornthep	Rajadamnern Stadium	Bangkok, Thailand	Decision	5	3:00
2015-07-20	Loss	(Thailand) Palangpon PetchyindeeAcademy	Rajadamnern Stadium	Thailand	Decision	5	3:00
2015-06-11	Win	(Thailand) Thanadet Thor.Pran49	Lumpinee Stadium	Bangkok, Thailand	TKO	4	
2015-05-13	Win	(Thailand) Palangpon PetchyindeeAcademy	Rajadamnern Stadium	Thailand	Decision	5	3:00
2015-04-02	Win	(Thailand) Satanmuanglek Numpornthep	Rajadamnern Stadium	Bangkok, Thailand	Decision	5	3:00
2015-03-07	Win	(Thailand) Konkobdai Wor.Wiwatananont	Lumpinee Stadium	Bangkok, Thailand	Decision	5	3:00
2015-01-26	Win	(Thailand) Satanmuanglek Numpornthep	Rajadamnern Stadium	Bangkok, Thailand	Decision	5	3:00
2014-10-28	Win	(Thailand) Sam-D PetchyindeeAcademy	Rajadamnern Stadium	Bangkok, Thailand	Decision	5	3:00
2014-09-29	Win	(Thailand) Achanai PetchyindeeAcademy	Rajadamnern Stadium	Bangkok, Thailand	Decision	5	3:00
2014-08-28	Win	(Thailand) Khunhahn Sitthongsak	Rajadamnern Stadium	Bangkok, Thailand	Decision	5	3:00
2014-07-27	Loss	(Thailand) Thanadet Thor.Pran49	Rangsit Stadium	Rangsit, Thailand	Decision	5	3:00
2014-01-21	Loss	(Thailand) Ploysiam PetchyindeeAcademy	Lumpinee Stadium	Bangkok, Thailand	Decision	5	3:00
2013-11-01	Loss	(Thailand) Newlukrak Pakornsurin	Lumpinee Stadium	Bangkok, Thailand	KO (right hook)	3	
2013-08-09	Loss	(Thailand) Sam-D PetchyindeeAcademy	Lumpinee Stadium	Bangkok, Thailand	Decision	5	3:00
Lost the Thailand Light Flyweight (108 lbs) title.
2013-07-11	Win	(Thailand) Sam-D PetchyindeeAcademy	Lumpinee Stadium	Bangkok, Thailand	Decision	5	3:00
2013-06-12	Loss	(Thailand) Ploysiam Petchyindeeacademy	Rajadamnern Stadium	Bangkok, Thailand	Decision	5	3:00
2013-05-09	Win	(Thailand) Sam-D PetchyindeeAcademy	Rajadamnern Stadium	Bangkok, Thailand	Decision	5	3:00
2013-03-15	Win	(Thailand) Baikarn Wor Sangthep	Lumpinee Stadium	Bangkok, Thailand	KO	3	3:00
Wins the Thailand Light Flyweight (108 lbs) title.
Legend: Win Loss Draw/no contest Notes
