= Sam-D PetchyindeeAcademy =

Thai Muay Thai fighter

- Born: Nattapong Visetsri; March 3, 1993 (age 33); Nakhon Ratchasima Province, Thailand
- Other names: Sam-D Gaiyanghadao
- Nationality: Thai
- Height: 164 cm (5 ft 5 in)
- Weight: 50 kg (110 lb; 7.9 st)
- Division: Minimumweight (2008-2010) Light Flyweight (2010-2017) Flyweight (2014-2018)
- Style: Muay Fimeu
- Fighting out of: Bangkok, Thailand
- Years active: 2001-2018

Kickboxing record
- Total: 101
- Wins: 73
- Losses: 27
- Draws: 1

Sam-D Petchyindee Academy (Thai: สามดี เพชรยินดีอะคาเดมี่) is a retired Thai Muay Thai fighter. He fought under Sia Boat, Nuttadaj Vachirattanawong, the leader of the Petchyindee promotion.

== Biography ==
Sam-D started boxing at 8 years old and was eventually picked up by the famous Petchyindee Academy camp at 18 years old. He was considered a top fighter from 2008 and up until his retirement in 2018. He had a fierce rivalry with Wanchai Kiatmuu9 whom he fought 6 times, with 4 wins to himself and 2 wins for Wanchai. He also had fierce rivalry with Satanmuanglek Numponthep, whom he had lost to thrice between 2013 and 2015. He finally won against Satanmuanglek, by KO, on his run for the Paedpakan Tournament title in 2017. He would retire the year after, at 25 years of age.

== Titles and accomplishments ==
- Lumpinee Stadium
  - 2012 Lumpinee Stadium 108 lbs Champion
- Professional Boxing Association of Thailand (PAT)
  - 2013 Thailand 108 lbs Champion
- Siam Omnoi Stadium
  - 2014 Siam Omnoi Stadium 108 lbs Champion
- True4U
  - 2017 Paedprakan Tournament 112 lbs Champion

== Fight record ==
Muay Thai Record
73 Wins, 27 Losses, 1 Draw
Date	Result	Opponent	Event	Location	Method	Round	Time
2018-09-13	Loss	(Thailand) Raktemroy Visootjaroenyon		Thailand	Decision	5	3:00
2018-03-07	Loss	(Thailand) Phetmuangchon Por.Suantong	Rajadamnern Stadium	Bangkok, Thailand	Decision	5	3:00
2018-08-08	Win	(Thailand) Priewpak Sor.Jor.Vichitpaedriw	Rajadamnern Stadium	Bangkok, Thailand	Decision	5	3:00
2017-12-24	Loss	(Thailand) Sarawut Sor.Jor.Vichitpaedriw	Rangsit Stadium	Rangsit, Thailand	Decision	5	3:00
2017-11-06	Win	(Thailand) Priewpak Sor.Jor.Vichitpaedriw	Rajadamnern Stadium	Bangkok, Thailand	Decision	5	3:00
2017-09-29	Loss	(Thailand) Phetmuangchon Por.Suantong	Lumpinee Stadium	Bangkok, Thailand	Decision	5	3:00
2017-08-04	Win	(Thailand) Satanmuanglek Numponthep	True4U Muaymanwansuk Paedprakan tournament final, Rangsit Stadium	Rangsit, Thailand	KO (Low kicks & Body kick)	4	2:45
Wins Paedprakan Tournament 112 lbs title.
2017-06-30	Win	(Thailand) Tongnoi Lukbanyai	True4U Muaymanwansuk, Rangsit Stadium	Rangsit, Thailand	Decision	5	3:00
2017-05-05	Win	(Thailand) Priewpak Sor.Jor.Vichitpaedriw	Rangsit Stadium	Rangsit, Thailand	Decision	5	3:00
2017-04-05	Loss	(Thailand) Priewpak Sor.Jor.Vichitpaedriw	Rajadamnern Stadium	Bangkok, Thailand	Decision	5	3:00
2017-03-03	Win	(Thailand) Wanchai Kiatmuu9	Rangsit Stadium	Rangsit, Thailand	Decision	5	3:00
2016-12-04	Loss	(Thailand) Raktemroy Visootjaroenyon	Rajadamnern Stadium	Bangkok, Thailand	Decision	5	3:00
2016-10-05	Win	(Thailand) Jaroenpon Popthiratham	Rajadamnern Stadium	Bangkok, Thailand	Decision	5	3:00
2016-06-28	Loss	(Thailand) Raktemroy Visootjaroenyon	Lumpinee Stadium	Bangkok, Thailand	Decision	5	3:00
2016-05-23	Win	(Thailand) Luktoy FA Group	Rajadamnern Stadium	Bangkok, Thailand	Decision	5	3:00
2016-04-07	Win	(Thailand) Jaroenpon Popthiratham	Rajadamnern Stadium	Bangkok, Thailand	Decision	5	3:00
2016-03-05	Loss	(Thailand) Jaroenpon Popthiratham	Omnoi Stadium	Samut Sakhon, Thailand	Decision	5	3:00
2016-02-08	Loss	(Thailand) Wanchai Kiatmuu9	Rajadamnern Stadium	Bangkok, Thailand	Decision	5	3:00
2015-12-25	Loss	(Thailand) Satanmuanglek Numponthep	Lumpinee Stadium	Bangkok, Thailand	Decision	5	3:00
For the Lumpinee Stadium 108 lbs title.
2015-11-11	Win	(Thailand) Detchaiya PetchyindeeAcademy	Rajadamnern Stadium	Bangkok, Thailand	KO	4	
2015-09-14	Win	(Thailand) Rit Jitmuangnon	Rajadamnern Stadium	Bangkok, Thailand	Decision	5	3:00
2015-08-11	Win	(Thailand) Detchaiya PetchyindeeAcademy	Lumpinee Stadium	Bangkok, Thailand	Decision	5	3:00
2015-06-29	Loss	(Thailand) Ronachai Santi-Ubon		Udon Thani, Thailand	Decision	5	3:00
2015-05-23	Win	(Thailand) Chopper Kor.Sapaotong	Omnoi Stadium	Samut Sakhon, Thailand	Decision	5	3:00
2015-04-02	Loss	(Thailand) Wanchai Kiatmuu9	Rajadamnern Stadium	Bangkok, Thailand	Decision	5	3:00
2015-03-06	Loss	(Thailand) Thanadet TorPhran49	Lumpinee Stadium	Bangkok, Thailand	Decision	5	3:00
2015-01-26	Loss	(Thailand) Wanchai Kiatmuu9	Rajadamnern Stadium	Bangkok, Thailand	Decision	5	3:00
2014-10-28	Loss	(Thailand) Rungnarai Kiatmuu9	Rajadamnern Stadium	Bangkok, Thailand	Decision	5	3:00
2014-09-29	Win	(Thailand) Detkart Por.Pongsawang	Rajadamnern Stadium	Bangkok, Thailand	Decision	5	3:00
2014-09-06	Win	(Thailand) Yodpadang Kiatbanjong	Omnoi Stadium	Samut Sakhon, Thailand	KO	4	
Wins the Omnoi Stadium 108 lbs Title.
2014-05-08	Win	(Thailand) Wanchai Kiatmuu9	Rajadamnern Stadium	Bangkok, Thailand	Decision	5	3:00
2014-04-05	Win	(Thailand) Worachet Por Rungrum	Ladprao Stadium	Bangkok, Thailand	KO (Left High Kick)	5	
2014-02-22	Win	(Thailand) Phetlukfang Chor Pinarath	Ladprao Stadium	Bangkok, Thailand	Decision	5	3:00
2014-01-24	Win	(Thailand) Denlanna Sor Werapon	Lumpinee Stadium	Bangkok, Thailand	KO (Left Cross)	3	
2013-12-03	Loss	(Thailand) Satanmuanglek Numponthep	Lumpinee Stadium	Bangkok, Thailand	Decision	5	3:00
Lost the Thailand 108 lbs Title.
2013-10-10	Loss	(Thailand) Dokmaidang JSP	Rajadamnern Stadium	Bangkok, Thailand	Decision	5	3:00
2013-09-13	Loss	(Thailand) Satanmuanglek Numponthep	Lumpinee Stadium	Bangkok, Thailand	Decision	5	3:00
2013-08-09	Win	(Thailand) Rungnarai Kiatmuu9	Lumpinee Stadium	Bangkok, Thailand	Decision	5	3:00
Wins 108 lbs Thailand title.
2013-07-11	Loss	(Thailand) Rungnarai Kiatmuu9	Lumpinee Stadium	Bangkok, Thailand	Decision	5	3:00
2013-06-12	Win	(Thailand) Wanchai Kiatmuu9	Rajadamnern Stadium	Bangkok, Thailand	Decision	5	3:00
2013-05-09	Loss	(Thailand) Rungnarai Kiatmuu9	Rajadamnern Stadium	Bangkok, Thailand	Decision	5	3:00
2013-03-29	Loss	(Thailand) Chaisiri Sakniranrat	Lumpinee Stadium	Bangkok, Thailand	Decision	5	3:00
Lost the 108 lbs Lumpinee Stadium title.
2013-03-01	Win	(Thailand) Julong Ekbangsai	Lumpinee Stadium	Bangkok, Thailand	Decision	5	3:00
2013-01-22	Win	(Thailand) Wanchai Kiatmuu9	Lumpinee Stadium	Bangkok, Thailand	KO (Left Elbow)	3	
2012-12-07	Win	(Thailand) Sarawut Pitakparpadaeng	Lumpinee Stadium	Bangkok, Thailand	Decision	5	3:00
Wins the Lumpinee Stadium 108 lbs title.
2012-11-02	Win	(Thailand) Wanchai Kiatmuu9	Lumpinee Stadium	Bangkok, Thailand	Decision	5	3:00
2012-10-09	Win	(Thailand) Jumong Ekbangsai	Lumpinee Stadium	Bangkok, Thailand	Decision	5	3:00
2012-08-07	Win	(Thailand) Rongrungsak Lukromklao	Lumpinee Stadium	Bangkok, Thailand	Decision	5	3:00
2012-07-06	Win	(Thailand) Chainoi Worawut	Petchpiya, Lumpinee Stadium	Bangkok, Thailand	Decision	5	3:00
2012-05-04	Win	(Thailand) Rungruangsak Lukromklao	Lumpinee Stadium	Bangkok, Thailand	Decision	5	3:00
2012-01-24	Win	(Thailand) Kaka Tharanasuranakorn	Lumpinee Stadium	Bangkok, Thailand	KO (Knees)	3	
Legend: Win Loss Draw/No contest Notes
