= Kongchai Chanaidonmuang =

Thai Muay Thai fighter

- Born: Sarawut Maenmai; September 29, 2002 (age 24); Buriram, Thailand
- Other names: Kongchai Tor.Sangtiennoi Kongsiam (former)
- Nationality: Thai
- Height: 167 cm (5 ft 6 in)
- Weight: 57 kg (126 lb; 9.0 st)
- Style: Muay Bouk
- Stance: Southpaw
- Fighting out of: Pathum Thani, Thailand
- Trainer: Sangtiennoi Sor.Rungroj

Kongchai Chanaidonmuang (Thai: ก้องชัย ไฉนดอนเมือง) is a Thai Muay Thai fighter. He trained under Sangtiennoi Sor.Rungroj at Tor.Sangtiennoi gym in the North of Pathum Thani Province and fights under the banner of the OneSongchai promotion.

== Biography and career ==
Kongchai was born in the Prakhon Chai District of Buriram Province. He started boxing at 10 years old and started fighting soon after. Originally called Kongsiam, he later changed his ring name to Kongchai.

=== ONE Championship ===
Kongchai made his ONE Championship debut at ONE Friday Fights 3 against Kritpetch P.K.Saenchai on February 3, 2023. He won the fight by first round knockout.

Kongchai faced Akram Hamidi at ONE Friday Fights 66 on June 8, 2024. He lost the fight by first round technical knockout.

On November 15, 2024, Kongchai defeated Chokpreecha P.K.Saenchai by unanimous decision. They both received a fight of the night bonus.

On January 10, 2025 Kongchai faced Ramadan Ondash in the main event of ONE Friday Fights 93. He lost the fight by unanimous decision.

Kongchai rematched Chokpreecha P.K.Saenchai at ONE Friday Fights 108. He won the fight by knockout in the second round.

== Titles and accomplishments ==
- ONE Championship
  - Performance of the Night (Four times) vs. Kritpetch P.K.Saenchai, Xavier Gonzalez, Chokpreecha P.K.Saenchai, Chokpreecha P.K.Saenchai
- Rajadamnern Stadium
  - 2020 Rajadamnern Stadium 115 lbs Champion
- Thanakorn Stadium
  - 2020 Thanakorn Stadium 122 lbs Champion
- Jitmuangnon Stadium (Or.Tor.Gor.3 Stadium)
  - 2022 Jitmuangnon 126 lbs Champion

== Fight record ==
Muay Thai Record
Date	Result	Opponent	Event	Location	Method	Round	Time
2026-11-06	Loss	(Egypt) Tantawy Ahmed Hafez	ONE: The Inner Circle 37, Lumpinee Stadium	Bangkok, Thailand	Decision (unanimous)	3	3:00
2026-06-05	Win	(Moldova) Valerii Strungari	ONE Friday Fights 157, Lumpinee Stadium	Bangkok, Thailand	KO (Knee)	1	1:32
2026-03-28	Win	(Iran) Mehrdad Khanzadeh	ONE Friday Fights 148, Lumpinee Stadium	Bangkok, Thailand	Decision (Unanimous)	3	3:00
2026-01-30	Win	(Myanmar) Thway Lin Htet	ONE Friday Fights 140, Lumpinee Stadium	Bangkok, Thailand	Decision (Unanimous)	3	3:00
2025-09-19	Win	(Brazil) Walter Goncalves	ONE Friday Fights 125, Lumpinee Stadium	Bangkok, Thailand	Decision (Unanimous)	3	3:00
2025-06-27	Loss	(Thailand) Kompetch Fairtex	ONE Friday Fights 114, Lumpinee Stadium	Bangkok, Thailand	Decision (Unanimous)	3	3:00
2025-05-16	Win	(Thailand) Chokpreecha P.K.Saenchai	ONE Friday Fights 108, Lumpinee Stadium	Bangkok, Thailand	KO (Left cross)	2	0:26
2025-02-28	Loss	(Thailand) Chartpayak Saksatoon	ONE Friday Fights 98, Lumpinee Stadium	Bangkok, Thailand	Decision (Unanimous)	3	3:00
2025-01-10	Loss	(Lebanon) Ramadan Ondash	ONE Friday Fights 93, Lumpinee Stadium	Bangkok, Thailand	Decision (Unanimous)	3	3:00
2024-11-15	Win	(Thailand) Chokpreecha P.K.Saenchai	ONE Friday Fights 87, Lumpinee Stadium	Bangkok, Thailand	Decision (Unanimous)	3	3:00
2024-09-13	Win	(Russia) Amir Abdulmuslimov	ONE Friday Fights 79, Lumpinee Stadium	Bangkok, Thailand	Decision (Unanimous)	3	3:00
2024-06-08	Loss	(Algeria) Akram Hamidi	ONE Friday Fights 66, Lumpinee Stadium	Bangkok, Thailand	TKO (Punches)	1	1:41
2024-04-05	Loss	(Thailand) Kompetch Sitsarawatsuer	ONE Friday Fights 58, Lumpinee Stadium	Bangkok, Thailand	Decision (Unanimous)	3	3:00
2024-01-26	Win	(Spain) Xavier Gonzalez	ONE Friday Fights 49, Lumpinee Stadium	Bangkok, Thailand	Decision (Unanimous)	3	3:00
2023-09-08	Loss	(Thailand) Kompetch Sitsarawatsuer	ONE Friday Fights 32, Lumpinee Stadium	Bangkok, Thailand	Decision (Unanimous)	3	3:00
2023-07-21	Win	(Belgium) Jelte Blommaert	ONE Friday Fights 26, Lumpinee Stadium	Bangkok, Thailand	Decision (Unanimous)	3	3:00
2023-05-28	Win	(Spain) Xavier Gonzalez	ONE Friday Fights 14, Lumpinee Stadium	Bangkok, Thailand	Decision (Majority)	3	3:00
2023-03-03	Win	(Thailand) Chalamkhao P.K.Saenchai	ONE Friday Fights 7, Lumpinee Stadium	Bangkok, Thailand	Decision (Unanimous)	3	3:00
2023-02-03	Win	(Thailand) Kritpetch P.K.Saenchai	ONE Friday Fights 3, Lumpinee Stadium	Bangkok, Thailand	KO (Body kick)	1	1:15
2022-12-25	Loss	(Thailand) Apiwat SorJor.OleyYasothon	Muaydee VitheeThai + Jitmuangnon, Or.Tor.Gor3 Stadium	Nonthaburi province, Thailand	Decision	5	3:00
2022-11-18	Draw	(Thailand) Diesellek BuildJC	Ruamponkon + Prachin	Prachinburi province, Thailand	Decision (Split)	5	3:00
2022-10-06	Win	(Japan) Kaito Wor.Wanchai	Petchyindee, Rajadamnern Stadium	Bangkok, Thailand	Decision	5	3:00
2022-09-04	Win	(Thailand) Apiwat SorJor.OleyYasothon	Muaydee VitheeThai + Jitmuangnon, Or.Tor.Gor3 Stadium	Nonthaburi province, Thailand	Decision (Split)	5	3:00
Wins the vacant Jitmuangnon Featherweight title
2022-07-27	Loss	(Thailand) Saenson Erawan	Muay Thai Chalermprakiat + Yod Muay Mahachon	Nonthaburi province, Thailand	Decision	5	3:00
2022-07-03	Win	(Thailand) Pornpitak SorTor.TanomsriBangpu	Muaydee VitheeThai + Jitmuangnon, Or.Tor.Gor3 Stadium	Nonthaburi province, Thailand	Decision	5	3:00
2022-06-04	Win	(Thailand) Superlek Jitmuangnon	Jaomuaythai, Siam Omnoi Stadium	Samut Sakhon, Thailand	Decision	5	3:00
2022-05-07	Draw	(Thailand) Petchtawee Sor.PhongAmorn	Jitmuangnon Super Fight, Or.Tor.Gor3 Stadium	Nonthaburi province, Thailand	Decision	5	3:00
2022-04-16	Win	(Thailand) Petchthong NayokwitThungSong	Jitmuangnon Super Fight, Or.Tor.Gor.3 Stadium	Nonthaburi Province, Thailand	TKO (Punches)	3	
2022-03-20	Win	(Thailand) Petchpadriew SorJor.Vichitmuangpadriew	MuayDeeVithitai + Jitmuangnon, Or.Tor.Gor.3 Stadium	Nonthaburi Province, Thailand	Decision	5	3:00
2022-02-20	Loss	(Thailand) Petchthong NayokwitThungSong	MuayDeeVithitai + Jitmuangnon, Or.Tor.Gor.3 Stadium	Nonthaburi Province, Thailand	Decision	5	3:00
For the Jitmuangnon Featherweight title
2021-12-19	Win	(Thailand) Phethuahin Sor.Prawatmuang	MuayDeeVithitai + Jitmuangnon, Or.Tor.Gor.3 Stadium	Nonthaburi Province, Thailand	TKO (Punches & Knees)	3	
2021-11-14	Win	(Thailand) Chalamdam NayokwitThungSong	MuayDeeVithitai + Jitmuangnon, Or.Tor.Gor.3 Stadium	Nonthaburi Province, Thailand	Decision	5	3:00
2021-04-17	Loss	(Thailand) Superlek Jitmuangnon	SuekJaoMuayThai, Siam Omnoi Stadium	Samut Prakan, Thailand	KO (Right Elbow)	2	
2021-03-12	Loss	(Thailand) Saksri Kiatmoo9	Muaymanwansuk, Rangsit Stadium	Rangsit, Thailand	Decision	5	3:00
2020-11-14	Loss	(Thailand) Superlek Jitmuangnon	Jitmuangnon + Sor.CafeMuayThai, OrTorGor.3 Stadium	Nonthaburi Province, Thailand	Decision (split)	5	3:00
2020-09-26	Win	(Thailand) Yodpanom Por.Petchkaikaew	OneSongchai, Thanakorn Stadium	Nakhon Pathom Province, Thailand	Decision	5	3:00
Wins Thanakorn Stadium 122 lbs title
2020-08-25	Draw	(Thailand) Watcharapon PKsaenchaiMuayThai	Chef Boontham, Thanakorn Stadium	Nakhon Pathom Province, Thailand	Decision	5	3:00
2020-07-25	Loss	(Thailand) Wanmawin Pumpanmuang	Yodmuay Onesongchai, Thanakorn Stadium	Nakhon Pathom Province, Thailand	KO (Right Elbow)	2	
2020-03-05	Win	(Thailand) Puenkon Tor.Surat	Rajadamnern Stadium	Bangkok, Thailand	Decision	5	3:00
2020-01-30	Win	(Thailand) Phetsuphan Por.Daorungruang	Rajadamnern Stadium	Bangkok, Thailand	Decision	5	3:00
Wins the Rajadamnern Stadium 115 lbs title
2019-12-12	Win	(Thailand) Yodpetch AnnyMuayThai	Rajadamnern Stadium	Bangkok, Thailand	TKO (Punches & Elbows)	2	
2019-11-07	Win	(Thailand) Phichitchai Sor.ChatchaiGym	Rajadamnern Stadium	Bangkok, Thailand	TKO (Punches)	4	
2019-09-30	Win	(Thailand) Paruhatlek Muangsima	Rajadamnern Stadium	Bangkok, Thailand	Decision	5	3:00
2019-08-17	Win	(Thailand) Paruhatlek Muangsima	Thanakorn Stadium	Nakhon Pathom Province, Thailand	Decision	5	3:00
2019-06-06	Win	(Thailand) Fahlan Por.Petchkaikaew	Rajadamnern Stadium	Bangkok, Thailand	KO (Left High Kick)	4	
2019-04-22	Win	(Thailand) Maoklee Petchsimuen	Rajadamnern Stadium	Bangkok, Thailand	Decision	5	3:00
2019-03-26	Win	(Thailand) Yodpanom Por.Petchkaikaew	Lumpinee Stadium	Bangkok, Thailand	KO (Left Elbow)	4	
2019-02-28	Loss	(Thailand) Maoklee Petchsimuen	Rajadamnern Stadium	Bangkok, Thailand	Decision	5	3:00
2018-12-27	Win	(Thailand) Rungnara Rattanaphanu	Rajadamnern Stadium	Bangkok, Thailand	KO (Left Cross)	3	0:07
2018-11-05	Win	(Thailand) Tongsabat Or.NokkaewMuayThai	Rajadamnern Stadium	Bangkok, Thailand	Decision	5	3:00
2018-08-30	Loss	(Thailand) Tongsabat Or.NokkaewMuayThai		Thailand	Decision	5	3:00
2018-06-03	Win	(Thailand) Liempetch Lookphayalithai	Channel 5 Stadium	Thailand	Decision	5	3:00
2018-04-22	Win	(Thailand) Sudsakorn Sitnayokmoht	Rangsit Stadium	Rangsit, Thailand	Decision	5	3:00
2018-01-28	Win	(Thailand) Numphibun Por.Prakan		Thailand	KO	4	
Legend: Win Loss Draw/No contest Notes
