= Palangpol CP Freshmart =

Thai boxer

Palangpol
- Born: Rangsan Chayanram; July 8, 1985 (age 41); Mueang Buriram District, Thailand
- Other names: D-Day Sor Thaneth (ดีเดย์ ส.ธเนศ); Palangpol Sor Thaneth (พลังพล ส.ธเนศ); Palangpon Por Thairungruangkamai (พลังพล ป.ไทยรุ่งเรืองค้าไม้); Palangpon Piriyanoppachai (พลังพล พิริยะนพชัย); Palangpon Chuwattana (พลังพล ชูวัฒนะ); Palangpon Watcharachaigym; Ja Day (จ่าเดย์) "Sergeant Day"
- Nationality: Thai
- Height: 162 cm (5 ft 4 in)
- Weight: 50 kg (110 lb; 7.9 st)
- Stance: Orthodox
- Fighting out of: Bangkok, Thailand
- Team: Pechyindee; Sit-O

Other information
- Boxing record from BoxRec

Rangsan Chayanram (Thai: รังสรรค์ จะยันรัมย์; born 8 July 1985), nicknamed Day (เดย์) and better known as Palangpol CP Freshmart (พลังพล ซีพีเฟรชมาร์ท), is a retired Thai professional boxer and a Muay Thai kickboxer. As a boxer, he challenged for the WBO junior-flyweight title in 2017.

== Professional career ==
He was born in Mueang Buriram District, Buriram province. He has practiced Muay Thai since the age of 9, training out of the Sit O camp. He had bouts against the likes of Wanchai Kiatmuu9 Satanmuanglek Por.Satanmuang, Wanheng Menayothin, Paipharob Kokietgym, etc. He has won three championships in two different weight classes of the Rajadamnern Stadium and Lumpinee Boxing Stadium.

After moving under Petchyindee Boxing Promotion and adopted the name "Palangpol Petchyindee Academy" (พลังพล เพชรยินดีอะคาเดมี่), Palangpol struggled. At that time, Japanese boxer, Koki Eto travelled to Thailand to challenge for the WBA flyweight interim title against Kompayak Porpramook, he was pushed as Eto's sparring partner. He started his professional boxing career during this time.

He competed in Muay Thai and professional boxing alternately, winning the WBA Asia light flyweight title and highly ranked by the WBO.

On September 13, 2017, at the age of 32, he challenged the WBO world champion, Kosei Tanaka, at Edion Arena. Tanaka was a huge favorite going into the fight, but Palangpol would prove to be Tanaka's toughest challenger so far, dropping the defending champion once in the first round and trading back-and-forth combinations for the rest of the bout. After a thrilling fight, Tanaka would finally gain the upper hand in round 9, as he knocked down Palangpol and continued to land big combinations as the challenger struggled to connect. Eventually, the referee stepped in and stopped the fight at 1:52 in round 9. Tanaka was severely cut under his eyes, and was consequently sidelined after the fight. After the bout, Nattadej "Boat" Wachirarattanawong, his assistant manager, said that at his age he would continue competing in both Muay Thai and professional boxing.

== Titles and accomplishments ==
=== Muay Thai ===
- Rajadamnern Stadium
  - 2005 Rajadamnern Stadium 105 lbs Champion
  - 2008 Rajadamnern Stadium 108 lbs Champion
- Lumpinee Stadium
  - 2003 Lumpinee Stadium 105 lbs Champion
- World Professional Muaythai Federation
  - 2015 interim WPMF World Flyweight Champion

== Professional boxing record ==
18 fights	16 wins	2 losses
By knockout	9	2
By decision	7	0

No.	Result	Record	Opponent	Type	Round, time	Date	Location	Notes
18	Win	16–2	(Tajikistan) Abdulvosid Buranov	PTS	6 (6)	31 July 2018	Thanyaburi, Thailand	
17	Win	15–2	(India) Gaurav Singh	TKO	5 (6)	27 April 2018	Rangsit International Stadium, Rangsit, Thailand	
16	Loss	14–2	(Japan) Kosei Tanaka	TKO	9 (12), 1:29	13 Sep 2017	Edion Arena, Osaka, Japan	For the WBO junior-flyweight title
15	Win	14–1	(Indonesia) Samuel Tehuayo	UD	6 (6)	15 July 2017	City Hall Ground, Chonburi, Thailand	
14	Win	13–1	(Thailand) Kompetch Twins Gym	TKO	3 (6)	1 March 2017	Chonburi Provincial Ground, Chonburi, Thailand	
13	Win	12–1	(Philippines) Vincent Bautista	UD	12	29 June 2016	City Hall's Ground, Khon Kaen, Thailand	Retained WBA Asia Light Flyweight title
12	Win	11–1	(Philippines) Roque Lauro	UD	12	19 February 2016	Bangmod Wittaya School, Chomthong, Bangkok, Thailand	Retained WBA Asia Light Flyweight title
11	Win	10–1	(Indonesia) Silem Serang	RTD	8 (12)	12 December 2015	City Hall Ground, Chonburi, Thailand	Retained WBA Asia Light Flyweight title
10	Win	9–1	(Indonesia) Samuel Tehuayo	RTD	8 (12)	26 June 2015	Asiatique Riverfront, Bangkok, Thailand	Retained WBA Asia Light Flyweight title
9	Win	8–1	(Philippines) Bimbo Nacionales	KO	4 (12)	25 February 2015	SP Stainless Sport Ground, Bangkok, Thailand	Retained WBA Asia Light Flyweight title
8	Win	7–1	(Philippines) Donny Mabao	PTS	8 (8)	30 January 2015	Chom Thong District Office, Bangkok, Thailand	
7	Win	6–1	(Indonesia) Heri Amol	UD	12	28 November 2014	The Society Ayutthaya Resort, Ayutthaya, Thailand	Retained WBA Asia Light Flyweight title
6	Win	5–1	(Indonesia) Tommy Seran	UD	12	1 October 2014	I-Mobile Football Stadium, Buriram, Thailand	Retained WBA Asia Light Flyweight title
5	Win	4–1	(Philippines) Joan Imperial	TKO	6 (12)	7 August 2014	Chokchai 4 Market, Bangkok, Thailand	Retained WBA Asia Light Flyweight title
4	Win	3–1	(Indonesia) Heri Amol	TKO	8 (12)	25 April 2014	Central Stadium, Phitsanulok, Thailand	Retained WBA Asia Light Flyweight title
3	Win	2–1	(Indonesia) Jack Amisa	KO	4 (12)	4 March 2014	Suranaree Army Camp Stadium, Nakhon Ratchasima, Thailand	Wins the vacant WBA Asia Light Flyweight title
2	Win	1–1	(Thailand) Mongkol Patanakan Gym	KO	4 (6)	31 January 2014	Nongplalai School, Ubon Ratchathani, Thailand	
1	Loss	0–1	(Japan) Koji Itagaki	KO	7 (8)	12 June 2011	Sangyo Hall, Hiroshima, Japan	

== Muay Thai record ==
Muay Thai Record
Date	Result	Opponent	Event	Location	Method	Round	Time
2018-06-11	Loss	(Thailand) Rungnarai Kiatmuu9	Rajadamnern Stadium	Bangkok, Thailand	Decision	5	3:00
2018-04-04	Loss	(Thailand) Jomhod Eminentair	Rajadamnern Stadium	Bangkok, Thailand	Decision	5	3:00
2018-03-07	Loss	(Thailand) Yothin FA Group	Rajadamnern Stadium	Bangkok, Thailand	Decision	5	3:00
2018-01-31	Win	(Thailand) Phetmuangchon Por.Suantong	Rajadamnern Stadium	Bangkok, Thailand	Decision	5	3:00
2017-12-22	Loss	(Thailand) Rungnarai Kiatmuu9	True4U Muaymanwansuk	Saraburi Province, Thailand	Decision	5	3:00
For the True4u Muaymumwansuk 112 lbs title.
2017-11-10	Win	(Thailand) Sarawut Sor.Jor.Vichitpadriew	True4U Muaymunwansuk, Rangsit Stadium	Rangsit, Thailand	Decision	5	3:00
2017-06-05	Win	(Thailand) Sarawut Sor.Jor.Vichitpadriew	Rajadamnern Stadium	Bangkok, Thailand	Decision	5	3:00
2017-05-04	Loss	(Thailand) Rungnarai Kiatmuu9	Rajadamnern Stadium	Bangkok, Thailand	Decision	5	3:00
2017-03-17	Loss	(Thailand) Nongyot Sitjakan	True4U Muaymunwansuk, Rangsit Stadium	Rangsit, Thailand	KO (Left high kick)	5	
2017-02-04	Loss	(Thailand) Rungnarai Kiatmuu9		Isan, Thailand	Decision	5	3:00
2017-01-12	Win	(Thailand) Phetrong Nayokkaipedriew	Wanmeechai, Rajadamnern Stadium	Bangkok, Thailand	KO (Left hook)	3	
2016-12-12	Loss	(Thailand) Kiewpayak Jitmuangnon	Rajadamnern Stadium	Bangkok, Thailand	Decision	5	3:00
2016-11-14	Win	(Thailand) Kiewpayak Jitmuangnon	Rajadamnern Stadium	Bangkok, Thailand	Decision	5	3:00
2016-09-05	Win	(Thailand) Sarawut Sor.Jor.Vichitpadriew	Phetwiset, Rajadamnern Stadium	Bangkok, Thailand	Decision	5	3:00
2016-08-01	Win	(Thailand) Nongyot Sitjekan	Phetwiset, Rajadamnern Stadium	Bangkok, Thailand	Decision	5	3:00
2016-05-09	Win	(Thailand) Wanchai Kiatmuu9	Wanmeechai, Rajadamnern Stadium	Bangkok, Thailand	Decision	5	3:00
2016-04-07	Loss	(Thailand) Yothin FA Group	Rajadamnern Stadium	Bangkok, Thailand	Decision	5	3:00
2015-11-30	Loss	(Thailand) Wanchai Kiatmuu9	Wanmeechai, Rajadamnern Stadium	Bangkok, Thailand	Decision	5	3:00
2015-11-09	Win	(Thailand) Rungnarai Kiatmuu9	Rajadamnern Stadium	Bangkok, Thailand	Decision	5	3:00
2015-10-07	Win	(Thailand) Wanchai Kiatmuu9	Wanmeechai, Rajadamnern Stadium	Bangkok, Thailand	Decision	5	3:00
2015-08-11	Loss	(Thailand) Yothin FA Group	Lumpinee Stadium	Bangkok, Thailand	Decision	5	3:00
2015-07-20	Win	(Thailand) Rungnarai Kiatmuu9	Rajadamnern Stadium	Bangkok, Thailand	Decision	5	3:00
2015-05-13	Loss	(Thailand) Rungnarai Kiatmuu9	Rajadamnern Stadium	Bangkok, Thailand	Decision	5	3:00
2015-04-02	Win	(Thailand) Thanadet Tor.Pran 49	Wanmeechai, Rajadamnern Stadium	Bangkok, Thailand	KO (Punches)	2	
2014-10-28	Loss	(Thailand) Wanchai Rambo-Isan	Petchyindee, Lumpinee Stadium	Bangkok, Thailand	Decision	5	3:00
2014-08-28	Loss	(Thailand) Satanmuanglek Chitladagym	Rajadamnern Stadium	Bangkok, Thailand	Decision	5	3:00
2014-07-08	Win	(Thailand) Ruengsak Sitniwat	Lumpinee Stadium	Bangkok, Thailand	Decision	5	3:00
2014-06-11	Win	(Thailand) Wanchai Rambo-Isan	Phetwiset Rajadamnern Stadium	Bangkok, Thailand	Decision	5	3:00
2014-01-03	Loss	(Thailand) Satanmuanglek Por.Satanmuang	Lumpinee Stadium	Bangkok, Thailand	Decision	5	3:00
2013-11-29	Loss	(Thailand) Morakot Komsaimai	Lumpinee Stadium	Bangkok, Thailand	KO (Right high kick)	3	
2013-10-01	Loss	(Thailand) Chaisiri Chor.KowYuhaIsuzu	Lumpinee Stadium	Bangkok, Thailand	Decision	5	3:00
2013-09-04	Loss	(Thailand) Wanchai Rambo-Isan	Phetwiset + Wanmeechai, Rajadamnern Stadium	Bangkok, Thailand	Decision	5	3:00
2013-07-19	Loss	(Thailand) Bangpleenoi 96Peenang	Lumpinee Stadium	Bangkok, Thailand	Decision	5	3:00
2013-04-29	Loss	(Thailand) Petch Ekbangsai	Rajadamnern Stadium	Bangkok, Thailand	Decision	5	3:00
2013-03-08	Win	(Thailand) Katapet Sor Suradet	Lumpinee Stadium	Bangkok, Thailand	Decision	5	3:00
2013-02-01	Loss	(Thailand) Gusagonnoi Sor Junsen	Onesongchai, Lumpinee Stadium	Bangkok, Thailand	Decision	5	3:00
2012-12-24	Win	(Thailand) Trakunpet Sor Sommai	Rajadamnern Stadium	Bangkok, Thailand	KO (Elbows)		
2012-11-12	Loss	(Thailand) Trakunpet Sor Sommai	Rajadamnern Stadium	Bangkok, Thailand	Decision	5	3:00
2012-09-12	Loss	(Thailand) Prajanchai Por Phetnamtong	Tor.Chaiwat, Rajadamnern Stadium	Bangkok, Thailand	Decision	5	3:00
2012-06-08	Loss	(Thailand) Superlek Wor.Sangprapai	Lumpinee Stadium	Bangkok, Thailand	Decision	5	3:00
For the vacant Thailand Flyweight (112 lbs) title.
2012-05-10	Loss	(Thailand) Ruengsak Pansomboon	Rajadamnern Stadium	Bangkok, Thailand	Decision	5	3:00
2012-03-27	Loss	(Thailand) Superlek Wor.Sangprapai	Petchyindee, Lumpinee Stadium	Bangkok, Thailand	Decision	5	3:00
2012-01-27	Win	(Thailand) Nokrajib Sitproad	Petchsupapan, Rajadamnern Stadium	Bangkok, Thailand	Decision	5	3:00
2011-09-15	Win	(Thailand) Kaewkla Kaewsamrit	Daorung Chujaroen, Rajadamnern Stadium	Bangkok, Thailand	Decision	5	3:00
2011-08-04	Draw	(Thailand) Atthaphon Phithakmuangkhaen	Sor.Sommai, Rajadamnern Stadium	Bangkok, Thailand	Decision	5	3:00
2011-07-05	Loss	(Thailand) Pompuen Kiatchongkhao	Petchsupapan, Lumpinee Stadium	Bangkok, Thailand	Decision	5	3:00
2011-05-30	Win	(Thailand) Pentai Singpatong	Rajadamnern Stadium	Bangkok, Thailand	KO (Elbow)		
2011-03-17	Loss	(Thailand) Mongkolchai Kwaitonggym	Rajadamnern Stadium	Bangkok, Thailand	Decision	5	3:00
2011-01-19	Win	(Thailand) Phankomlek Kiatniwat	Rajadamnern Stadium	Bangkok, Thailand	Decision	5	3:00
2010-12-23	Loss	(Thailand) Weerachai Wor.Wiwattanon	Rajadamnern Stadium Birthday event	Bangkok, Thailand	Decision	5	3:00
2010-10-14	Loss	(Thailand) Lamnamoon Sakchaichot	Onesongchai, Rajadamnern Stadium	Bangkok, Thailand	Decision	5	3:00
2010-08-30	Win	(Thailand) Hanchai Kiatyongyut	Rajadamnern Stadium	Bangkok, Thailand	Decision	5	3:00
2010-08-09	Win	(Thailand) Rungruengchai Sor.Charoensiri	Daorung Chujaroen, Rajadamnern Stadium	Bangkok, Thailand	Decision	5	3:00
2010-07-01	Loss	(Thailand) Polkrit Naplatrahuimuk	Daorung Chujaroen, Rajadamnern Stadium	Bangkok, Thailand	Decision	5	3:00
2010-06-10	Loss	(Thailand) Fhasawang Tor.Sangtiennoi	Onesongchai, Rajadamnern Stadium	Bangkok, Thailand	Decision	5	3:00
2010-03-05	Win	(Thailand) Norasing Lukbanyai	Lumpinee Stadium	Bangkok, Thailand	Decision	5	3:00
2010-01-14	Win	(Thailand) Fahsawang Tor.Sangtiennoi	Onesongchai, Rajadamnern Stadium	Bangkok, Thailand	Decision	5	3:00
2009-12-10	Win	(Thailand) Hanchai Kiatyongyut	Onesongchai, Rajadamnern Stadium	Bangkok, Thailand	Decision	5	3:00
2009-10-08	Win	(Thailand) Yodtongthai Por.Telakun	Palangnum, Rajadamnern Stadium	Bangkok, Thailand	Decision	5	3:00
2009-09-17	Loss	(Thailand) Yodtongthai Por.Telakun	Onesongchai, Rajadamnern Stadium	Bangkok, Thailand	Decision	5	3:00
Loses the Rajadamnern Stadium 108 lbs title.
2009-07-03	Win	(Thailand) Norasing Lukbanyai	Lumpinee Stadium	Bangkok, Thailand	TKO (Elbow + knees)	4	
2009-05-28	Win	(Thailand) Taweesak Singklongksi	Rajadamnern Stadium	Bangkok, Thailand	Decision	5	3:00
2009-03-12	Win	(Thailand) Taweesak Singklongksi	Onesongchai, Rajadamnern Stadium	Bangkok, Thailand	Decision	5	3:00
2008-12-18	Win	(Thailand) Khiewba Sor.Ploenchit	Onesongchai, Rajadamnern Stadium	Bangkok, Thailand	Decision	5	3:00
2008-11-02	Win	(Thailand) Sirichoke Pharasomboon	Rajadamnern Stadium	Bangkok, Thailand	KO	3	
2008-10-09	Win	(Thailand) Payaknoi Wor.Wiwattanon	Oneseongchai, Rajadamnern Stadium	Bangkok, Thailand	Decision	5	3:00
2008-09-18	Loss	(Thailand) Payaknoi Wor.Wiwattanon	Onesongchai, Rajadamnern Stadium	Bangkok, Thailand	Decision	5	3:00
2008-08-07	Win	(Thailand) Khiewba Sor.Ploenchit	Onesongchai, Rajadamnern Stadium	Bangkok, Thailand	Decision	5	3:00
2008-07-09	Win	(Thailand) Yodprabsuek Por Khumphai	Rajadamnern Stadium	Bangkok, Thailand	Decision	5	3:00
2008-06-09	Win	(Thailand) Padejsuk Sunkilatha	Rajadamnern Stadium	Bangkok, Thailand	Decision	5	3:00
2008-05-12	Loss	(Thailand) Payaknoi Wor.Wiwattanon	Rajadamnern Stadium	Bangkok, Thailand	Decision	5	3:00
2008-04-19	Win	(Thailand) Namphet Sor.Thantip	Omnoi Stadium	Bangkok, Thailand	Decision	5	3:00
2008-03-01	Win	(Thailand) Payaknum Sitniwat	Omnoi Stadium	Bangkok, Thailand	Decision	5	3:00
2008-01-30	Loss	(Thailand) Payaknum Sitniwat	Kiatyongyut, Rajadamnern Stadium	Bangkok, Thailand	Decision	5	3:00
2007-11-21	Win	(Thailand) Yodprabsuek Por Khumphai	Kiatsingnoi, Rajadamnern Stadium	Bangkok, Thailand	Decision	5	3:00
2007-07-04	Loss	(Thailand) Pakorn Sakyothin	Onesongchai, Rajadamnern Stadium	Bangkok, Thailand	Decision	5	3:00
2007-06-07	Win	(Thailand) Pakorn Sakyothin	Onesongchai, Rajadamnern Stadium	Bangkok, Thailand	Decision	5	3:00
2007-05-05	Loss	(Thailand) Pakorn Sakyothin	Onesongchai, Rajadamnern Stadium	Bangkok, Thailand	Decision	5	3:00
2007-04-04	Loss	(Thailand) Hanchai Kiatyongyut	Onesongchai, Rajadamnern Stadium	Bangkok, Thailand	Decision	5	3:00
2007-03-07	Win	(Thailand) Yodprabsuek Por Khumphai	Kiatyongyut, Rajadamnern Stadium	Bangkok, Thailand	Decision	5	3:00
2007-01-22	Loss	(Thailand) Luknimit Singklongsi	Rajadamnern Stadium	Bangkok, Thailand	Decision	5	3:00
2006-12-20	Win	(Thailand) Namphet Sor Thanthip	Phetchaopraya, Rajadamnern Stadium	Bangkok, Thailand	Decision	5	3:00
2006-11-15	Loss	(Thailand) Wanheng Menayothin	Meenayothin, Rajadamnern Stadium	Bangkok, Thailand	Decision	5	3:00
2006-10-28	Win	(Thailand) Jomhod Eminentair	Onesongchai	Bangkok, Thailand	KO	2	
2006-10-04	Win	(Thailand) Sudpatapee Dejrat	Onesongchai, Rajadamnern Stadium	Bangkok, Thailand	Decision	5	3:00
2006-08-31	Loss	(Thailand) Jomhod Eminentair	Onesongchai, Rajadamnern Stadium	Bangkok, Thailand	Decision	5	3:00
2006-06-26	Loss	(Thailand) Fahsang Tor.Pitakchai	Onesongchai, Rajadamnern Stadium	Bangkok, Thailand	Decision	5	3:00
2006-05-08	Loss	(Thailand) Norasing Lukbanyai	Rajadamnern Stadium	Bangkok, Thailand	KO	1	
2006-04-06	Win	(Thailand) Chalermpon Petsupapan	Onesongchai, Rajadamnern Stadium	Bangkok, Thailand	Decision	5	3:00
2006-02-16	Win	(Thailand) Petdam Sitboonmee	Onesongchai, Rajadamnern Stadium	Bangkok, Thailand	Decision	5	3:00
2006-01-19	Loss	(Thailand) Binla Menayothin	Onesongchai, Rajadamnern Stadium	Bangkok, Thailand	Decision	5	3:00
Loses the Rajadamnern Stadium 105 lbs title.
2005-12-22	Loss	(Thailand) Linglom Tor.Chalermchai	Rajadamnern Stadium Birthday show	Bangkok, Thailand	Decision	5	3:00
2005-11-14	Win	(Thailand) Petdam Sitboonmee	Rajadamnern Stadium	Bangkok, Thailand	Decision	5	3:00
2005-09-26	Win	(Thailand) Wanheng Menayothin	Onesongchai, Rajadamnern Stadium	Bangkok, Thailand	Decision	5	3:00
2005-09-01	Win	(Thailand) Yodpichit EmientAir	Onesongchai, Rajadamnern Stadium	Bangkok, Thailand	Decision	5	3:00
2005-07-28	Loss	(Thailand) Luknimit Singklongsi	Rajadamnern Stadium	Bangkok, Thailand	Decision	5	3:00
2005-06-06	Win	(Thailand) Aidu 13CoinsExpress	Onesongchai, Rajadamnern Stadium	Bangkok, Thailand	Decision	5	3:00
2005-04-06	Win	(Thailand) Aidu 13CoinsExpress	Onesongchai, Rajadamnern Stadium	Bangkok, Thailand	Decision	5	3:00
2005-02-17	Loss	(Thailand) Phanfah Sor Damrongrit	Onesongchai, Rajadamnern Stadium	Bangkok, Thailand	Decision	5	3:00
2005-01-20	Win	(Thailand) Luknimit Singklongsi	Onesongchai, Rajadamnern Stadium	Bangkok, Thailand	Decision	5	3:00
2004-11-11	Loss	(Thailand) Phanfah Sor Damrongrit	Rajadamnern Stadium	Bangkok, Thailand	Decision	5	3:00
2004-10-14	Win	(Thailand) Chalermphon Petsupan	Onesongchai, Rajadamnern Stadium	Bangkok, Thailand	Decision	5	3:00
2004-08-16	Win	(Thailand) Yerman Somkirdkharka	Onesongchai, Rajadamnern Stadium	Bangkok, Thailand	Decision	5	3:00
2004-07-19	Win	(Thailand) Wanheng Menayothin	Onesongchai, Rajadamnern Stadium	Bangkok, Thailand	Decision	5	3:00
2004-06-03	Loss	(Thailand) Rungrat Narratrikul	Onesongchai, Rajadamnern Stadium	Bangkok, Thailand	Decision	5	3:00
2004-05-10	Loss	(Thailand) Rungrat Narratrikul	Onesongchai, Rajadamnern Stadium	Bangkok, Thailand	Decision	5	3:00
2004-02-26	Win	(Thailand) Oke Sor.Thantip	Jarumueang + Daorung Chujaroen, Lumpinee Stadium	Bangkok, Thailand	Decision	5	3:00
2004-01-03	Win	(Thailand) Khaosod Sor Naowarat	Krikkrai, Lumpinee Stadium	Bangkok, Thailand	Decision	5	3:00
2003-11-28	Loss	(Thailand) Nutthapon Tor.Muangnamdam	Lumpinee Stadium	Bangkok, Thailand	Decision	5	3:00
Loses the Lumpinee Stadium 105 lbs title.
2003-10-10	Win	(Thailand) Kaichon Saengphanpla	Lumpinee Stadium	Bangkok, Thailand	Decision	5	3:00
2003-08-22	Win	(Thailand) Chatchai Sor.Thanayong	Petchpiya, Lumpinee Stadium	Bangkok, Thailand	Decision	5	3:00
Wins the Lumpinee Stadium 105 lbs title.
Legend: Win Loss Draw/No contest Notes
