= Satanmuanglek CP Freshmart =

Thai Muay Thai fighter (born 1992)

Satanmuanglek
- Born: Tanawat Nakoon; October 9, 1992 (age 34); Ubon Ratchathani, Thailand
- Other names: Satanmuanglek Por.Satanmuang; Satanmuanglek Chitladagym; Satarnmuanglek Windysport (สะท้านเมืองเล็ก วินดี้สปอร์ต); Satarnmuanglek Jenwitkosang; Satanmuenglek Numponthep; Satanmuanglek Numpponthep
- Height: 165 cm (5 ft 5 in)
- Division: Pinweight; Mini Flyweight; Light Flyweight; Flyweight
- Style: Muay Thai (Muay Bouk)
- Team: Numponthep; Petchyindee

Professional boxing record
- Total: 12
- Wins: 11
- By knockout: 5
- Losses: 1

Kickboxing record
- Total: 302
- Wins: 271
- By knockout: 40
- Losses: 30
- Draws: 1

Other information
- Boxing record from BoxRec

Tanawat Nakoon (Thai: ???; born October 9, 1992), known professionally as Satanmuanglek PetchyindeeAcademy (Thai: สะท้านเมืองเล็ก เพชรยินดีอะคาเดมี่), is a Thai former professional Muay Thai fighter and boxer. He is a former three-time Lumpinee Stadium and also challenged for a WBA Light Flyweight title in boxing.

== Titles and accomplishments ==
=== Muay Thai ===
- World MuayThai Council
  - 2012 WMC World Pinweight (100 lbs) Champion
- Professional Boxing Association of Thailand (PAT)
  - 2013 Thailand Mini Flyweight (105 lbs) Champion (1 defense)
  - 2013 Thailand Light Flyweight (108 lbs) Champion
- Lumpinee Stadium
  - 2013 Lumpinee Stadium Mini Flyweight (105 lbs) Champion
  - 2015 Lumpinee Stadium Light Flyweight (108 lbs) Champion
  - 2016 Lumpinee Stadium Light Flyweight (108 lbs) Champion
- Petchyindee True4U Muaymanwansuk
  - 2016 True4U Light Flyweight (108 lbs) Champion (2 defenses)
- World MuayThai Organization
  - 2020 WMO World Flyweight (112 lbs) Champion

=== Boxing ===
- 2019 OPBF Silver Light Flyweight Champion
- 2018 WBC Asian Boxing Council Minimumweight Champion (3 defenses)

== Professional Boxing record ==
Key to abbreviations used for results
DQ	Disqualification	RTD	Corner retirement
KO	Knockout	SD	Split decision / split draw
MD	Majority decision / majority draw	TD	Technical decision / technical draw
NC	No contest	TKO	Technical knockout
PTS	Points decision	UD	Unanimous decision / unanimous draw

Boxing record
No.	Result	Record	Opponent	Type	Round(s)	Time	Date	Location	Notes
12	Loss	11–1	(Japan) Hiroto Kyoguchi	UD	12 (12)		19 June 2019	Makuhari Messe, Chiba, Japan	For WBA (Super) and The Ring light-flyweight titles
11	Win	11–0	(Philippines) Crison Omayao	TKO	4 (10)		22 Feb 2019	Rangsit International Stadium, Rangsit, Thailand	Won vacant OPBF Silver Light Flyweight Title
10	Win	10–0	(Philippines) Marco John Rementizo	UD	10 (10)		26 Oct 2018	Rangsit International Stadium, Rangsit, Thailand	Retained World Boxing Council Asian Boxing Council Minimumweight Title
9	Win	9–0	(Indonesia) Mektison Marganti	UD	6 (6)		9 Sept 2018	Rangsit International Stadium, Rangsit, Thailand	
8	Win	8–0	(Indonesia) Thomas Tope Hurek	KO	6 (12)		31 July 2018	Thanyaburi, Thailand	Won vacant Asian Boxing Federation Minimumweight Title
7	Win	7–0	(Indonesia) Silem Serang	TKO	5 (12)		25 May 2018	Lad Sawai Market, Pathum Thani, Thailand	Retained World Boxing Council Asian Boxing Council Minimumweight Title
6	Win	6–0	(Philippines) Geboi Mansalayao	KO	5 (12)		23 Mar 2018	SP Kansad Company, Nawamin Road, Soi 74, Bangkok, Thailand	Retained World Boxing Council Asian Boxing Council Minimumweight Title
5	Win	5–0	(Indonesia) Domi Nenokeba	UD	6 (6)		23 Feb 2018	Bangmod Wittaya School, Chomthong, Bangkok, Thailand	
4	Win	4–0	(Indonesia) Melianus Mirin	UD	10 (10)		26 Jan 2018	Rangsit International Stadium, Rangsit, Thailand	Won vacant World Boxing Council Asian Boxing Council Minimumweight Title
3	Win	3–0	(Vietnam) Minh Phat Sam	UD	6 (6)		15 Dec 2017	Siam Junction Market, Bangsue, Bangkok, Thailand	
2	Win	2–0	(Indonesia) Mektison Marganti	UD	6 (6)		24 Nov 2017	Suranaree Camp Stadium, Nakhon Ratchasima, Thailand	
1	Win	1–0	(Indonesia) Silem Serang	KO	6 (6)		29 Sept 2017	Le Meridien Chiang Rai Resort, Chiang Rai, Thailand	

== Muay Thai record ==
Muay Thai Record
Date	Result	Opponent	Event	Location	Method	Round	Time
2021-09-30	Loss	(Thailand) Petchsila Wor.Auracha	Petchyindee	Buriram, Thailand	Decision	5	3:00
2021-03-25	Loss	(Thailand) Phetsomjit Jitmuangnon	Petchyindee, Rangsit Stadium	Rangsit, Thailand	Decision	5	3:00
2020-09-11	Win	(Thailand) Rungnarai Kiatmuu9	Petchyindee + True4U, Rangsit Stadium	Rangsit, Thailand	Decision	5	3:00
Wins the vacant WMO World Flyweight title.
2020-08-07	Win	(Thailand) Petchthailand Mor.RajabhatSurin	True4U Muaymanwansuk, Rangsit Stadium	Rangsit, Thailand	KO (Elbow)	3	
2020-01-31	Loss	(Thailand) Phetsomjit Jitmuangnon	Phuket Super Fight Real Muay Thai	Mueang Phuket District, Thailand	Decision	5	3:00
2019-12-26	Win	(Thailand) Phetsommai Sor.Sommai	Rajadamnern Stadium	Bangkok, Thailand	KO (Elbow)	3	
2019-12-05	Win	(Thailand) Anuwat Natkinpla	Rajadamnern Stadium	Bangkok, Thailand	KO (Left Elbow)	4	
2019-11-06	Loss	(Thailand) Chanalert Meenayothin	Rajadamnern Stadium	Bangkok, Thailand	Decision	5	3:00
2019-10-03	Win	(Thailand) Chanalert Meenayothin	Rajadamnern Stadium	Bangkok, Thailand	Decision	5	3:00
2019-09-10	Loss	(Thailand) Phetsomjit Jitmuangnon	Lumpinee Stadium	Bangkok, Thailand	Decision	5	3:00
2019-08-09	Loss	(Thailand) Phetsomjit Jitmuangnon	Lumpinee Stadium	Bangkok, Thailand	Decision	5	3:00
2019-03-21	Win	(Thailand) Phetsomjit Jitmuangnon	Rajadamnern Stadium	Bangkok, Thailand	Decision	5	3:00
2018-12-26	Win	(Thailand) Anuwat Natkinpla	Rajadamnern Stadium	Bangkok, Thailand	Decision	5	3:00
2017-08-04	Loss	(Thailand) Sam-D Petchyindee Academy	True4U Paedprakan tournament final, Rangsit Stadium	Rangsit, Thailand	KO (Low kicks & body kick)	4	2:45
For the Paedprakan tournament final 112 lbs title.
2017-06-30	Win	(Thailand) Diesellek Wor.Wanchai	True4U Muaymanwansuk, Rangsit Stadium	Rangsit, Thailand	Decision	5	3:00
2017-05-12	Win	(Thailand) Wanchai Kiatmuu9	True4U Muaymanwansuk, Rangsit Stadium	Rangsit, Thailand	KO	4	
2017-04-05	Loss	(Thailand) Sarawut Sor.Jor.Vichitpedriew	Rajadamnern Stadium	Bangkok, Thailand	Decision	5	3:00
2017-03-03	Win	(Thailand) Priewpark Sor.Jor.Vichitpedriew	True4U Muaymanwansuk, Rangsit Stadium	Rangsit, Thailand	KO (Left elbow)	4	2:00
2017-01-27	Win	(Thailand) Wanchai Kiatmuu9	True4U Muaymanwansuk, Rangsit Stadium	Rangsit, Thailand	Decision	5	3:00
Defends the True4U Light Flyweight (108 lbs) title.
2017-01-05	Win	(Thailand) Tongnoi Lukbanyai	Rajadamnern Stadium	Bangkok, Thailand	TKO	3	
2016-12-12	Win	(Thailand) Ongree Sor.Dechapan	Rajadamnern Stadium	Bangkok, Thailand	Decision	5	3:00
2016-10-07	Win	(Thailand) Tukatatong Sor.Kiatwat	Rangsit Boxing Stadium	Rangsit, Thailand	KO	4	
Defends the True4U Light Flyweight (108 lbs) title.
2016-09-02	Win	(Thailand) Jaroenpon Poptheeratham	Rangsit Boxing Stadium	Rangsit, Thailand	KO	3	
Wins the True4U Light Flyweight (108 lbs) title.
2016-08-11	Win	(Thailand) Luktoy F.A.Group	Rajadamnern Stadium	Bangkok, Thailand	KO (Left elbow)	5	
2016-07-14	Loss	(Thailand) Jaroenpon Poptheeratham	Rajadamnern Stadium	Bangkok, Thailand	Decision	5	3:00
2016-06-10	Win	(Thailand) Jaroenpon Poptheeratham	Lumpinee Stadium	Bangkok, Thailand	Decision	5	3:00
Wins the Lumpinee Stadium Light Flyweight (108 lbs) title.
2016-05-09	Loss	(Thailand) Rungnarai Kiatmuu9	Rajadamnern Stadium	Bangkok, Thailand	KO (Right high kick)	3	
For the Rajadamnern Stadium Light Flyweight (108 lbs) title.
2016-03-22	Win	(Thailand) Wanchai Kiatmuu9	Lumpinee Stadium	Bangkok, Thailand	Decision	5	3:00
2016-02-29	Win	(Thailand) Tuktaphet Teeded99	Rajadamnern Stadium	Bangkok, Thailand	KO	4	
2016-02-04	Win	(Thailand) Ruangdej Sakvichian	Rajadamnern Stadium	Bangkok, Thailand	Decision	5	3:00
2015-12-25	Win	(Thailand) Sam-D Petchyindee Academy	Lumpinee Stadium	Bangkok, Thailand	Decision	5	3:00
Wins the vacant Lumpinee Stadium Light Flyweight (108 lbs) title.
2015-11-02	Loss	(Thailand) Wanchai Kiatmuu9	Rajadamnern Stadium	Bangkok, Thailand	Decision	5	3:00
2015-09-27	Win	(Thailand) Thanadet Thor.Pran49	Imperial Lat Phrao Boxing Stadium	Lat Phrao, Thailand	Decision	5	3:00
2015-08-11	Loss	(Thailand) Rungnarai Kiatmuu9	Rajadamnern Stadium	Bangkok, Thailand	Decision	5	3:00
2015-07-14	Loss	(Thailand) Achanai PetchyindeeAcademy	Rajadamnern Stadium	Bangkok, Thailand	Decision	5	3:00
2015-06-11	Win	(Thailand) Wanchai Kiatmuu9	Rajadamnern Stadium	Bangkok, Thailand	Decision	5	3:00
2015-05-05	Win	(Thailand) Banlangnoen Suwasangmancha	Lumpinee Stadium	Bangkok, Thailand	Decision	5	3:00
2015-04-02	Loss	(Thailand) Rungnarai Kiatmuu9	Rajadamnern Stadium	Bangkok, Thailand	Decision	5	3:00
2015-03-06	Loss	(Thailand) Wanchai Kiatmuu9	Lumpinee Stadium	Bangkok, Thailand	Decision	5	3:00
For the Lumpinee Stadium Light Flyweight (108 lbs) title.
2015-01-26	Loss	(Thailand) Rungnarai Kiatmuu9	Rajadamnern Stadium	Bangkok, Thailand	Decision	5	3:00
2014-11-25	Win	(Thailand) Thanadet Thor.Pran49	Lumpinee Stadium	Bangkok, Thailand	Decision	5	3:00
2014-10-28	Loss	(Thailand) Thanadet Thor.Pran49	Lumpinee Stadium	Bangkok, Thailand	Decision	5	3:00
2014-09-29	Win	(Thailand) Khunhan Sitthongsak	Rajadamnern Stadium	Bangkok, Thailand	Decision	5	3:00
2014-08-28	Win	(Thailand) Palangpon PetchyindeeAcademy	Rajadamnern Stadium	Bangkok, Thailand	Decision	5	3:00
2014-07-31	Win	(Thailand) Detkart Por. Pongsawan	Rajadamnern Stadium	Bangkok, Thailand	KO (Left high kick)	2	
2014-07-06	Win	(Thailand) Wanchai Kiatmuu9	Aswindam, Ladprao Stadium	Thailand	Decision	5	3:00
2014-05-08	Win	(Thailand) Detkart Por. Pongsawan	Rajadamnern Stadium	Bangkok, Thailand	Decision	5	3:00
2014-04-04	Loss	(Thailand) Wanchai RamboIsan		Songkhla Province, Thailand	Decision	5	3:00
2014-03-07	Win	(Thailand) Detkart Por. Pongsawan	Lumpinee Stadium	Bangkok, Thailand	KO (Punches & knee to the body)	4	
2014-02-07	Loss	(Thailand) Ruangsak Sitniwat	Lumpinee Stadium	Bangkok, Thailand	Decision	5	3:00
2014-01-03	Win	(Thailand) Palangpon PetchyindeeAcademy	Lumpinee Stadium	Bangkok, Thailand	Decision	5	3:00
2013-12-03	Win	(Thailand) Sam-D Petchyindee Academy	Lumpinee Stadium	Bangkok, Thailand	Decision	5	3:00
Wins the Thailand Mini Flyweight (108 lbs) title.
2013-10-10	Loss	(Thailand) Wanchai RamboIsan	Rajadamnern Stadium	Bangkok, Thailand	Decision	5	3:00
2013-09-13	Win	(Thailand) Sam-D Petchyindee Academy	Lumpinee Stadium	Bangkok, Thailand	Decision	5	3:00
2013-08-12	Loss	(Thailand) Detkart Por Pongsawang	Rajadamnern Stadium	Bangkok, Thailand	Decision	5	3:00
2013-07-11	Loss	(Thailand) Ploysiam Petchyindeeacademy	Rajadamnern Stadium	Bangkok, Thailand	Decision	5	3:00
2013-06-07	Win	(Thailand) Newlukrak Pakornsurin	Lumpinee Stadium	Bangkok, Thailand	Decision	5	3:00
Wins the Lumpinee Stadium Mini Flyweight (105 lbs) title.
2013-05-09	Win	(Thailand) Wanchai RamboIsan	Rajadamnern Stadium	Bangkok, Thailand	Decision	5	3:00
2013-04-09	Win	(Thailand) Dokmaidang JSP	Lumpinee Stadium	Bangkok, Thailand	KO (Left elbow)	2	
Defends the Thailand Mini Flyweight (105 lbs) title.
2013-03-13	Win	(Thailand) Ploysiam Petchyindeeacademy	Lumpinee Stadium	Bangkok, Thailand	Decision	5	3:00
2013-02-08	Win	(Thailand) Niwlukrak Eksindeekongym	Lumpinee Stadium	Bangkok, Thailand	KO (Left low kick)	3	
Wins the Thailand Mini Flyweight (105 lbs) title.
2013-01-11	Win	(Thailand) Dokmaidang JSP	Lumpinee Stadium	Bangkok, Thailand	Decision	5	3:00
2012-12-18	Win	(Thailand) Phetmuangchon Por.Suantong	Lumpinee Stadium	Bangkok, Thailand	KO (Left elbow)		
2012-11-13	Loss	(Thailand) Peteng Kiatphontip	Lumpinee Stadium	Bangkok, Thailand	Decision	5	3:00
For the WMC World Mini Flyweight (105 lbs) title.
2012-08-31	Draw	(Thailand) Yodmanut Phetpotong	Lumpinee Stadium	Bangkok, Thailand	Decision	5	3:00
2012-07-12	Loss	(Thailand) Phetmuangchon Por.Suantong	Rajadamnern Stadium	Bangkok, Thailand	Decision	5	3:00
2012-05-25	Win	(Thailand) Chopper Kor.Sapaothong	Lumpinee Stadium	Bangkok, Thailand	Decision	5	3:00
2012-03-21	Win	(Thailand) Kumantong Jitmuangnon	Rajadamnern Stadium	Bangkok, Thailand	Decision	5	3:00
Won the WMC World Pinweight (100 lbs) title.
2012-01-06	Loss	(Thailand) Dejsak Sakwichian	Lumpinee Stadium	Bangkok, Thailand	Decision	5	3:00
2011-11-29	Win	(Thailand) Denthoranee Sor.Weerapol	Lumpinee Stadium	Bangkok, Thailand	Decision	5	3:00
2011-09-28	Loss	(Thailand) Paeteng Kiatphontip	Rajadamnern Stadium	Bangkok, Thailand	Decision	5	3:00
2011-07-31	Win	(Japan) Yu Wor.Wanchai	Muay Thai WINDY Super Fight vol.8	Tokyo, Japan	Decision (Unanimous)	5	3:00
2009-04-03	Loss	(Thailand) Rittewada Sitthikul	Lumpinee Stadium	Thailand	Decision	5	3:00
Legend: Win Loss Draw/No contest Notes
