= Wanchai Kiatmuu9 =

Thai Muay Thai fighter

- Born: Booncherd Lukpraton; December 30, 1987 (age 38); Buriram, Thailand
- Other names: Wanchai Sor.Kitisak (วันชัย ส.กิตติศักดิ์); Wanchai RamboIsan (วันชัย แรมโบ้อีสาน)
- Height: 162 cm (5 ft 4 in)
- Division: Mini Flyweight; Light Flyweight
- Style: Muay Thai

Booncherd Lukpraton (born December 30, 1987), known professionally as Wanchai Kiatmuu9 (Thai: วันชัย เกียรติหมู่9), is a retired Thai Muay Thai fighter. He is a former five-time Lumpinee Stadium champion across two divisions who was active during the 2000s and 2010s.

== Titles and accomplishments ==
- Lumpinee Stadium
  - 2008 Lumpinee Stadium Mini Flyweight (105 lbs) Champion
  - 2010 Lumpinee Stadium Mini Flyweight (105 lbs) Champion
  - 2012 Lumpinee Stadium Light Flyweight (108 lbs) Champion
  - 2013 Lumpinee Stadium Light Flyweight (108 lbs) Champion
  - 2015 Lumpinee Stadium Light Flyweight (108 lbs) Champion
- Professional Boxing Association of Thailand (PAT)
  - 2012 Thailand Light Flyweight (108 lbs) Champion

== Muay Thai record ==
Muay Thai Record
Date	Result	Opponent	Event	Location	Method	Round	Time
2018-03-12	Loss	(Thailand) Petchawarit Sor.Jitpattana	Petchyindee, Rajadamnern Stadium	Bangkok, Thailand	Decision	5	3:00
2017-11-01	Loss	(Thailand) Sirichai Klongsuanpluresort	Wanmeechai, Rajadamnern Stadium	Bangkok, Thailand	Decision	5	3:00
2017-05-12	Loss	(Thailand) Satanmuanglek PetchyindeeAcademy	True4U Muaymanwansuk, Rangsit Stadium	Rangsit, Thailand	KO	4	
2017-04-05	Win	(Thailand) Diesellek Wor.Wanchai	Petchyindee	Thailand	Decision	5	3:00
2017-03-03	Loss	(Thailand) Sam-D PetchyindeeAcademy	Rangsit Stadium	Rangsit, Thailand	Decision	5	3:00
2017-01-27	Loss	(Thailand) Satanmuanglek PetchyindeeAcademy	True4U Muaymanwansuk, Rangsit Stadium	Rangsit, Thailand	Decision	5	3:00
For the True4U Light Flyweight (108 lbs) title.
2016-11-16	Loss	(Thailand) Sarawut Pitakparpadaeng	Petchaopraya, Jitmuangnon Stadium	Nonthaburi, Thailand	Decision	5	3:00
2016-08-31	Win	(Thailand) Luktemroy Visutjaroenyon	Sor.Sommai, Rajadamnern Stadium	Bangkok, Thailand	Decision	5	3:00
2016-07-06	Loss	(Thailand) Kiewpayak Jitmuangnon	Rajadamnern Stadium	Bangkok, Thailand	Decision	5	3:00
2016-05-09	Loss	(Thailand) Palangpon PetchyindeeAcademy	Wanmeechai, Rajadamnern Stadium	Bangkok, Thailand	Decision	5	3:00
2016-03-22	Loss	(Thailand) Satanmuanglek Numponthep	Lumpinee Stadium	Bangkok, Thailand	Decision	5	3:00
2016-02-29	Loss	(Thailand) Sirichai Klongsuanpluresort	Phetwiset, Lumpinee Stadium	Bangkok, Thailand	Decision	5	3:00
2016-02-08	Win	(Thailand) Sam-D PetchyindeeAcademy	Rajadamnern Stadium	Bangkok, Thailand	Decision	5	3:00
2015-12-25	Win	(Thailand) Nongyot Sitjekan	Lumpinee Stadium	Bangkok, Thailand	Decision	5	3:00
2015-11-30	Win	(Thailand) Palangpon PetchyindeeAcademy	Wanmeechai, Rajadamnern Stadium	Bangkok, Thailand	Decision	5	3:00
2015-11-02	Win	(Thailand) Satanmuanglek Numponthep	Rajadamnern Stadium	Bangkok, Thailand	Decision	5	3:00
2015-10-07	Loss	(Thailand) Palangpon PetchyindeeAcademy	Wanmeechai, Rajadamnern Stadium	Bangkok, Thailand	Decision	5	3:00
2015-09-09	Draw	(Thailand) Achanai Petchyindee	Wanmeetchai, Rajadamnern Stadium	Bangkok, Thailand	Decision	5	3:00
2015-08-11	Win	(Thailand) Rungkit Wor.Sanprapai	Lumpinee Stadium	Bangkok, Thailand	Decision	5	3:00
2015-07-20	Loss	(Thailand) Yothin FA Group	Phetwiset	Thailand	Decision	5	3:00
2015-06-11	Loss	(Thailand) Satanmuanglek Numponthep	Wan Kingthong, Rajadamnern Stadium	Bangkok, Thailand	Decision	5	3:00
2015-05-05	Loss	(Thailand) Sirichai Klongsuanpluresort	Petchyindee, Lumpinee Stadium	Bangkok, Thailand	Decision	5	3:00
2015-04-02	Win	(Thailand) Sam-D PetchyindeeAcademy	Rajadamnern Stadium	Bangkok, Thailand	Decision	5	3:00
2015-03-06	Win	(Thailand) Satanmuanglek Numponthep	Lumpinee Stadium	Bangkok, Thailand	Decision	5	3:00
Wins vacant Lumpinee Stadium (108 lbs) title.
2015-01-26	Win	(Thailand) Sam-D PetchyindeeAcademy	Phetwiset, Rajadamnern Stadium	Bangkok, Thailand	Decision	5	3:00
2014-10-28	Win	(Thailand) Palangpon PetchyindeeAcademy	Petchyindee, Lumpinee Stadium	Bangkok, Thailand	Decision	5	3:00
2014-09-29	Loss	(Thailand) Sirichai Klongsuanpluresort	Phetwiset, Rajadamnern Stadium	Bangkok, Thailand	Decision	5	3:00
2014-08-28	Win	(Thailand) Thanadet Thor.Pran49	Waan Kingthong, Rajadamnern Stadium	Bangkok, Thailand	Decision	5	3:00
2014-07-31	Win	(Thailand) Ruengsak Sitniwat	Phetwiset, Rajadamnern Stadium	Bangkok, Thailand	Decision	5	3:00
2014-07-06	Loss	(Thailand) Satanmuanglek Janevitkorsang	Aswindam, Ladprao Stadium	Thailand	Decision	5	3:00
2014-06-11	Loss	(Thailand) Palangpon PetchyindeeAcademy	Phetwiset Rajadamnern Stadium	Bangkok, Thailand	Decision	5	3:00
2014-05-08	Loss	(Thailand) Sam-D PetchyindeeAcademy	Rajadamnern Stadium	Bangkok, Thailand	Decision	5	3:00
2014-04-04	Win	(Thailand) Satanmuanglek WindySport		Songkhla Province, Thailand	Decision	5	3:00
2014-03-05	Loss	(Thailand) Ruengsak Sitniwat	OneSongChai	Nakhon Ratchasima, Thailand	Decision	5	3:00
2014-01-03	Loss	(Thailand) Ruengsak Sitniwat	Petchyindee, Lumpinee Stadium	Bangkok, Thailand	Decision	5	3:00
2013-12-03	Win	(Thailand) Detkart Por.Pongsawang	Lumpinee Champion Krikkrai, Lumpinee Stadium	Bangkok, Thailand	Decision	5	3:00
Wins the vacant Lumpinee Stadium (108 lbs) title.
2013-10-10	Win	(Thailand) Satanmuanglek WindySport	Rajadamnern Stadium	Bangkok, Thailand	Decision	5	3:00
2013-09-04	Win	(Thailand) Palangpon Por Thairungruangkamai	Phetwiset + Wanmeechai, Rajadamnern Stadium	Bangkok, Thailand	Decision	5	3:00
2013-07-30	Win	(Thailand) Chaisiri Sakniranrat	Petchyindee, Lumpinee Stadium	Bangkok, Thailand	Decision	5	3:00
2013-06-12	Loss	(Thailand) Sam-D PetchyindeeAcademy	Rajadamnern Stadium	Bangkok, Thailand	Decision	5	3:00
2013-05-09	Loss	(Thailand) Satanmuanglek WindySport	Rajadamnern Stadium	Bangkok, Thailand	Decision	5	3:00
2013-03-13	Win	(Thailand) Yuttasak Sakburiram	Phetwiset, Rajadamnern Stadium	Bangkok, Thailand	Decision	5	3:00
2013-01-22	Loss	(Thailand) Sam-D PetchyindeeAcademy	Lumpinee Stadium	Bangkok, Thailand	KO (Left Elbow)	3	
2012-12-19	Loss	(Thailand) Wanchana Or.Boonchuay	Wanmeechai, Rajadamnern Stadium	Bangkok, Thailand	Decision	5	3:00
2012-11-02	Loss	(Thailand) Sam-D PetchyindeeAcademy	Lumpinee Stadium	Bangkok, Thailand	Decision	5	3:00
2012-10-04	Loss	(Thailand) Newlukrak ExcindiconGym	Wanmeechai, Rajadamnern Stadium	Bangkok, Thailand	Decision	5	3:00
2012-09-07	Loss	(Thailand) Sarawut Pitakparpadaeng	Lumpinee Champion Krikkrai, Lumpinee Stadium	Bangkok, Thailand	Decision	5	3:00
Loses the Lumpinee Stadium (108 lbs) title.
2012-06-08	Win	(Thailand) Sarawut Phithakpaphadaeng	Lumpinee Champion Krikkrai, Lumpinee Stadium	Bangkok, Thailand	Decision (Unanimous)	5	3:00
Wins the Lumpinee Stadium (108 lbs) title.
2012-04-03	Win	(Thailand) Detkart Por.Pongsawang	Petchyindee, Lumpinee Stadium	Bangkok, Thailand	Decision (Unanimous)	5	3:00
Wins the vacant Thailand Light Flyweight (108 lbs) title.
2012-03-02	Loss	(Thailand) Superlek Kiatmuu9	Saengsawanphantpla, Lumpinee Stadium	Bangkok, Thailand	Decision	5	3:00
2012-02-03	Win	(Thailand) Superlek Kiatmuu9	Petchpiya, Lumpinee Stadium	Bangkok, Thailand	Decision	5	3:00
2012-01-11	Win	(Thailand) ET Petchsomnuek	Wankingthong, Rajadamnern Stadium	Bangkok, Thailand	Decision	5	3:00
2011-11-25	Win	(Thailand) ET Petchsomnuek	Petchyindee, Lumpinee Stadium	Bangkok, Thailand	Decision	5	3:00
2011-10-11	Loss	(Thailand) Songkhom Sakhomsila	Petchyindee, Lumpinee Stadium	Bangkok, Thailand	KO	2	
2011-09-13	Win	(Thailand) Petchchatchai Charoraioi	Petchpiya, Lumpinee Stadium	Bangkok, Thailand	Decision	5	3:00
2011-08-23	Win	(Thailand) Petchchatchai Charoraioi	Petchyindee, Lumpinee Stadium	Bangkok, Thailand	Decision	5	3:00
2011-05-10	Win	(Thailand) Thelek Wor.Sangprapai	Petchyindee, Lumpinee Stadium	Bangkok, Thailand	Decision	5	3:00
2011-03-25	Loss	(Thailand) Phetmorakok Wor.Sangprapai	Lumpinee Stadium	Bangkok, Thailand	Decision	5	3:00
Loses the Lumpinee Stadium Mini Flyweight (105 lbs) title.
2011-02-25	Loss	(Thailand) Thelek Wor.Sangprapai	Petchyindee, Lumpinee Stadium	Bangkok, Thailand	Decision	5	3:00
2011-01-04	Win	(Thailand) Hongthonglek Phithakhongthong	Petchyindee, Lumpinee Stadium	Bangkok, Thailand	Decision	5	3:00
2010-11-23	Loss	(Thailand) Khunsuk PN Gym	Fairtex, Lumpinee Stadium	Bangkok, Thailand	Decision	5	3:00
2010-10-08	Win	(Thailand) Aiyara Muangsurin	Weerapol, Lumpinee Stadium	Bangkok, Thailand	Decision	5	3:00
2010-08-24	Win	(Thailand) Phetnakhon Sor.LaddaGym	Petchyindee, Lumpinee Stadium	Bangkok, Thailand	Decision	5	3:00
2010-07-09	Loss	(Thailand) Mondam Sor.Weerapon	Petchyindee, Lumpinee Stadium	Bangkok, Thailand	Decision	5	3:00
2010-05-04	Loss	(Thailand) Chaidet Sor.Suriya	Petchyindee, Lumpinee Stadium	Bangkok, Thailand	KO	4	
2010-03-05	Win	(Thailand) Prakaypetch Kiatpratum	Lumpinee Champion Krikkrai, Lumpinee Stadium	Bangkok, Thailand	Decision	5	3:00
Wins the Lumpinee Stadium Mini Flyweight (105 lbs) title.
2010-01-30	Win	(Thailand) Siangmorakot Kiatrachanok	Omnoi Stadium	Bangkok, Thailand	Decision	5	3:00
2009-12-29	Loss	(Thailand) Mapichit Sitsongpeenong	Petchyindee, Lumpinee Stadium	Bangkok, Thailand	Decision	5	3:00
For the Thailand Mini Flyweight (105 lbs) title.
2009-11-11	Win	(Thailand) Saengmorakot Tawan	Rajadamnern Stadium	Bangkok, Thailand	Decision	5	3:00
2009-10-06	Win	(Thailand) Siriphet 96Peenang	Lumpinee Stadium	Bangkok, Thailand	Decision	5	3:00
2009-09-01	Loss	(Thailand) Choknamchai Sitjakung	Petchyindee, Lumpinee Stadium	Bangkok, Thailand	Decision	5	3:00
2009-08-07	Win	(Thailand) Choknamchai Sitjakung	Petchpiya, Lumpinee Stadium	Bangkok, Thailand	Decision	5	3:00
2009-07-01	Draw	(Thailand) Choknamchai Sitjakung	Rajadamnern Stadium	Bangkok, Thailand	Decision	5	3:00
2009-05-22	Loss	(Thailand) Pornsawan Porpramook	Por.Pramuk, Lumpinee Stadium	Bangkok, Thailand	KO	1	
2009-02-13	Win	(Thailand) Yodngoen Tor.Chalermchai	Petchyindee, Rajadamnern Stadium	Bangkok, Thailand	Decision	5	3:00
2008-12-10	Win	(Thailand) Fahmongkol Saengtawee	Sor.Sommai, Rajadamnern Stadium	Bangkok, Thailand	Decision	5	3:00
2008-09-30	Loss	(Thailand) Sailomnoi Tded99	Lumpinee Champion Krikkrai, Lumpinee Stadium	Bangkok, Thailand	Decision	5	3:00
2008-08-29	Win	(Thailand) Jingreedtong TwinsSpecial	Petchyindee, Lumpinee Stadium	Bangkok, Thailand	Decision	5	3:00
2008-07-04	Loss	(Thailand) Thanusuklek Or.Kwanmuang	Lumpinee Champion Krikkrai, Lumpinee Stadium	Bangkok, Thailand	KO	2	
2008-06-04	Loss	(Thailand) Thanusuklek Or.Kwanmuang	Sor.Sommai, Rajadamnern Stadium	Bangkok, Thailand	KO	1	
2008-05-10	Win	(Thailand) Duangpikthak Kor Saphaothong	Omnoi Stadium	Bangkok, Thailand	Decision	5	3:00
2008-03-28	Win	(Thailand) Nongbonlek Sitmutu	Lumpinee Champion Krikkrai, Lumpinee Stadium	Bangkok, Thailand	Decision	5	3:00
Wins the vacant Lumpinee Stadium Mini Flyweight (105 lbs) title.
2008-02-29	Win	(Thailand) Fahmongkol Saengtawee	Petchpiya, Lumpinee Stadium	Bangkok, Thailand	Decision	5	3:00
2007-12-28	Loss	(Thailand) Yodpetch Sitpadao	Petchpiya, Lumpinee Stadium	Bangkok, Thailand	Decision	5	3:00
2007-11-06	Loss	(Thailand) Fahrungruang Sor.Poolsawat	Petchpiya, Lumpinee Stadium	Bangkok, Thailand	Decision	5	3:00
2007-06-15	Loss	(Thailand) Chokchuay PetsiriGym	Petchpiya, Lumpinee Stadium	Bangkok, Thailand	KO	4	
2007-04-23	Win	(Thailand) Jomwo Chor.Pailee	Sor.Sommai, Rajadamnern Stadium	Bangkok, Thailand	Decision	5	3:00
2007-03-09		(Thailand) Nongbonlek Sitmutu	Petchyindee, Lumpinee Stadium	Bangkok, Thailand			
2007-01-30	Draw	(Thailand) Nongbonlek Sitmutu	Petchyindee, Lumpinee Stadium	Bangkok, Thailand	Decision	5	3:00
Legend: Win Loss Draw/No contest Notes
