= Kaito Fukuda =

Japanese Muay Thai fighter

Kaito
- Born: Kaito Fukuda; May 18, 1998 (age 28); Nagoya, Japan
- Native name: 福田 海斗
- Height: 1.70 m (5 ft 7 in)
- Weight: 55 kg (121 lb; 8.7 st)
- Style: Muay Khao
- Stance: Orthodox
- Fighting out of: Bangkok, Thailand; Nagoya, Japan
- Team: Nagoya Muay Thai Gym King Muay; Wor .Wanchai

Kickboxing record
- Total: 95
- Wins: 52
- By knockout: 22
- Losses: 42
- By knockout: 3
- Draws: 1

Kaito Fukuda also known under the name Kaito Wor.Wanchai (ไคโตะ ว.วันชัย) in Thailand is a Japanese Muay Thai fighter.

== Championships and accomplishments ==
=== Amateur ===
- 2010 Muay Thai WINDY Super Fight −40 kg Champion
- 2011 Muay Yoko −42 kg Tournament Champion
- 2011 Muay Thai WINDY Super Fight −45 kg Champion
- 2012 Muay Thai WINDY Super Fight −50 kg Champion
- 2012 TRIBELATE Flyweight Champion

=== Professional ===
- World Professional Muaythai Federation
  - 2015 WPMF World Flyweight Champion
- Professional Boxing Association of Thailand (PAT)
  - 2015 Thailand 112 lbs Champion (defended once)
- Muay Siam
  - 2017 Muay Siam 115 lbs Champion
- True4U - Petchyindee
  - 2018 True4u 115 lbs Champion
  - 2019 True4u 118 lbs Champion
- International MuayThai Sport Association
  - 2022 IMSA World Super Bantamweight Champion
  - 2024 IMSA World Featherweight Champion

== Fight record ==
Muay Thai record
53 Wins (23 (T)KO's), 46 Losses, 1 Draw
Date	Result	Opponent	Event	Location	Method	Round	Time
2026-11-29		(Thailand) Namtaduad Kiatchatchai	Wanchai MuayThai Super Fight vol.13	Nagoya, Japan			
2026-09-12	Loss	(Thailand) Cactus Tor.Bruce Lee	Rajadamnern World Series	Bangkok, Thailand	TKO (Doctor stoppage)	1	2:20
2026-08-02	Win	(Japan) Kenichi Takeuchi	KNOCK OUT 66	Tokyo, Japan	KO	2	1:18
2026-06-06	Win	(Iran) Mehdi Rezaie	Rajadamnern World Series, Rajadamnern Stadium	Bangkok, Thailand	KO (Left hook)	2	1:38
2026-05-10	Win	(Thailand) Surasak KruDamGym	KNOCK OUT REBELS Series.10	Tokyo, Japan	TKO	3	1:20
2025-12-13	Loss	(Thailand) Surasak KruDamGym	Rajadamnern World Series	Bangkok, Thailand	TKO (Knees)	1	2:35
2025-09-21	Loss	(Thailand) Chiebkat Por.Phongsawang	Wanchai MuayThai Super Fight vol.11	Nagoya, Japan	Decision	5	3:00
2025-08-23	Win	(Spain) Carlos Coello	Rajadamnern World Series	Bangkok, Thailand	Decision (Unanimous)	3	3:00
2025-07-06	Win	(Thailand) The Rock MFC	HOOST CUP KINGS NAGOYA 17	Nagoya, Japan	Decision (Unanimous)	3	3:00
2024-11-27	Loss	(Thailand) Pranpetch Wor.Sangprapai		Bangkok, Thailand	Decision	5	3:00
2024-08-02	Loss	(Thailand) PetchChonlatan Gor.Adisak	Muaymanwansuk, Rangsit Stadium	Pathum Thani, Thailand	Decision	5	3:00
2024-06-30	Win	(Thailand) Yodkhunsuk Moobangchonbun	Suk Wanchai MuayThai Super Fight	Nagoya, Japan	TKO (Doctor stoppage)	4	
Wins the vacant IMSA World Featherweight (126 lbs) title.
2024-05-28	Loss	(Thailand) Oley Rakkaidicha	Muaymansananmuang, Rangsit Stadium	Pathum Thani, Thailand	Decision	5	3:00
2024-01-25	Win	(Thailand) Senson Erawan	Petchyindee, Rajadamnern Stadium	Bangkok, Thailand	Decision	5	3:00
2023-12-26	Loss	(Thailand) Petchnamnueng Tor.Surat	Muaymansananmuang, Rangsit Stadium	Pathum Thani, Thailand	Decision	5	3:00
2023-11-23	Loss	(Thailand) Phetbunchob Sor.Pararat	TorNamThai Ruamponkon Samui Kiatpetch, Rajadamnern Stadium	Bangkok, Thailand	Decision	5	3:00
2023-10-22	Win	(Thailand) Noppadet Chor.Hapayak	TorNamThai Ruamponkon Samui Kiatpetch, Rajadamnern Stadium	Bangkok, Thailand	TKO (Knees)	3	
2023-08-12	Win	(Thailand) Petchsongpon SongponKNC	Rajadamnern World Series	Bangkok, Thailand	KO (Elbow)	2	1:07
2023-07-18	Loss	(Thailand) Chiebkat Por.Phongsawang	Muaymansananmuang, Rangsit Stadium	Pathum Thani, Thailand	Decision	5	3:00
2023-04-23	Loss	(Thailand) Gaipar Por.Wisetgym	Suk Wanchai MuayThai Super Fight	Nagoya, Japan	Decision (Unanimous)	5	3:00
Loses the IMSA World Super Bantamweight title.
2023-03-07	Win	(Thailand) Chiebkat Por.Phongsawang	Muaymansananmuang, Rangsit Stadium	Pathum Thani, Thailand	Decision	5	3:00
2022-12-09	Loss	(Spain) Mikel Fernández	Rajadamnern World Series	Bangkok, Thailand	Decision (Unanimous)	3	3:00
2022-10-30	Loss	(Thailand) Saenson Erawan	Suk Wanchai+Muayded 789 MuayThai Super Fight	Tokyo, Japan	Decision (Split)	5	3:00
2022-10-06	Loss	(Thailand) Kongchai Chanaidonmuang	Petchyindee, Rajadamnern Stadium	Bangkok, Thailand	Decision	5	3:00
2022-08-19	Win	(Thailand) Petchto FighterMuayThai	Rajadamnern World Series	Bangkok, Thailand	KO (Elbow)	2	
2022-07-07	Draw	(Thailand) Petchto FighterMuayThai	Petchyindee, Rajadamnern Stadium	Bangkok, Thailand	Decision	5	3:00
2022-06-09	Win	(Thailand) Chatchai Dabransarakarm	Petchyindee, Rajadamnern Stadium	Bangkok, Thailand	Decision	5	3:00
2022-04-24	Win	(Thailand) Kumandoi PetchyindeeAcademy	Suk Wanchai MuayThai Super Fight	Nagoya, Japan	Decision (Unanimous)	5	3:00
Wins the inaugural IMSA World Super Bantamweight title.
2022-03-10	Loss	(Thailand) Fahpratan Dabransarakarm	Petchyindee, Rajadamnern Stadium	Bangkok, Thailand	Decision	5	3:00
2021-12-12	Win	(Japan) Hikaru Furumura	HOOST CUP KINGS NAGOYA 10	Nagoya, Japan	Decision (Unanimous)	5	3:00
2021-11-14	Win	(Japan) Takanobu Sano	Suk Wan Kingthong	Tokyo, Japan	KO (Elbow)	5	0:34
Handicap fight. Sano was allowed to weigh in a weight class up.
2021-10-10	Win	(Thailand) Khun Namisan Shobukai	Suk Wan Kingthong "step by step"	Tokyo, Japan	Decision (Unanimous)	3	3:00
2021-07-29	Win	(Thailand) Ponchan SirilakMuayThaiGym	Suk Wan Kingthong	Tokyo, Japan	TKO (Doctor Stoppage)	2	2:14
2021-06-13	Win	(Japan) Satoshi Katashima	Suk Wan Kingthong "Let's do our best!"	Tokyo, Japan	Decision (Unanimous)	3	3:00
2021-04-11	Loss	(Japan) Koki Osaki	BOM WAVE 04 – Get Over The COVID-19, Bantamweight Championship Final	Yokohama, Japan	Decision (Unanimous)	5	3:00
For the Battle of MuayThai Bantamweight title.
2021-03-07	Win	(Japan) King Takeshi	HOOST CUP KINGS KYOTO 7	Kyoto, Japan	Decision (Unanimous)	3	3:00
2020-10-29	Win	(Japan) Ryota Mawatari	NO KICK NO LIFE ~Shin Shou~	Tokyo, Japan	Decision (Unanimous)	5	3:00
2020-10-04	Win	(Japan) Yutto ZERO	BOM WAVE 02 Get Over The COVID-19, Bantamweight Championship Semi Final	Yokohama, Japan	TKO (Referee Stoppage)	3	1:16
2020-02-28	Win	(Thailand) Wattana MTMacademy	Rajadamnern Stadium	Bangkok, Thailand	TKO (Punches)	4	
2020-01-15	Loss	(Thailand) Nongyot Sitjaekan	Rajadamnern Stadium	Bangkok, Thailand	Decision	5	3:00
2019-12-25	Loss	(Thailand) Chanyut Sakrungrung	Rajadamnern Stadium	Bangkok, Thailand	Decision	5	3:00
2019-12-02	Loss	(Thailand) Nongyot Sitjaekan	Rajadamnern Stadium	Bangkok, Thailand	Decision	5	3:00
2019-10-06	Win	(Thailand) Rungnarai Kiatmuu9	Suk Wanchai MuayThai Super Fight vol.6	Nagoya, Japan	KO (Body Punches)	3	
Wins the True4u Bantamweight (118 lbs) title.
2019-09-11	Loss	(Thailand) Charoenrit RawaiMuayThai	Rajadamnern Stadium	Bangkok, Thailand	Decision	5	3:00
2019-07-31	Win	(Thailand) Charoenrit RawaiMuayThai	Rajadamnern Stadium	Bangkok, Thailand	Decision	5	3:00
2019-07-05	Loss	(Thailand) Charoenrit RawaiMuayThai	Lumpinee Stadium	Bangkok, Thailand	Decision	5	3:00
2019-06-05	Loss	(Thailand) Kaomongkol Petchyindee Academy	Rajadamnern Stadium	Bangkok, Thailand	Decision	5	3:00
2019-04-24	Win	(Thailand) Ngatao Po.Waralak	Rajadamnern Stadium	Bangkok, Thailand	TKO (Knees to the Body)	4	
2019-03-29	Win	(Thailand) Silapathai Priwwayo	Lumpinee Stadium	Bangkok, Thailand	KO (Left Hook to the Body)	4	
2019-02-22	Loss	(Thailand) Saksit Kiatmoo9	Lumpinee Stadium	Bangkok, Thailand	Decision	5	3:00
2019-01-18	Win	(Thailand) Silapathai Priwwayo	Lumpinee Stadium	Bangkok, Thailand	Decision	5	3:00
2018-11-02	Loss	(Thailand) Pamphet Wor.Sangprapai		Pathum Thani	Decision	5	3:00
2018-09-24	Win	(Thailand) Thanadet Thor.Pran 49	Suk Wanchai Muay Thai Super Fight Vol.5	Nagoya, Japan	Decision	5	3:00
Wins the 115lbs True4u Muaymumwansuek title.
2018-07-18	Win	(Thailand) Jomthong Sakwichian	Rajadamnern Stadium	Bangkok, Thailand	KO (Right Elbow)	3	
2018-06-18	Win	(Thailand) Nongbee Phriwwayo	Rajadamnern Stadium	Bangkok, Thailand	KO (Knees to the Body)	4	
2018-04-18	Loss	(Thailand) Buakawlek Sit-Or.Boonchop	Rajadamnern Stadium	Bangkok, Thailand	Decision	5	3:00
2018-03-19	Win	(Thailand) Esankiew Numpontep	Rajadamnern Stadium	Bangkok, Thailand	Decision	5	3:00
2017-12-21	Loss	(Thailand) Kanongsuk Kor.Kampanath	Rajadamnern Stadium	Bangkok, Thailand	Decision	5	3:00
2017-11-12	Win	(Thailand) Ratanapon Nor.Anuwatgym	Rajadamnern Stadium	Bangkok, Thailand	Decision	5	3:00
2017-08-07	Loss	(Thailand) Chatphet Sor.Poonsawat	Rajadamnern Stadium	Bangkok, Thailand	Decision	5	3:00
2017-07-05	Win	(Thailand) Phetanan Bor.Jarinsak	Rajadamnern Stadium	Bangkok, Thailand	KO		
2017-06-16	Win	(Thailand) Chasar Or.Bor.Tor Rambontamai	Ban Mo Stadium	Thailand	KO	3	
Wins the Muay Siam Super Flyweight title.
2017-05-22	Loss	(Thailand) Kemphet Wor.Praianunt	Rajadamnern Stadium	Bangkok, Thailand	Decision	5	3:00
2017-03-13	Loss	(Thailand) Dodo Lukkohkrak	Rajadamnern Stadium	Bangkok, Thailand	TKO (Left Elbow)	3	
2016-11-14	Loss	(Thailand) Flukenoi Moosaphanmai	Rajadamnern Stadium	Bangkok, Thailand	Decision	5	3:00
2016-10-06	Loss	(Thailand) Ruandet Sakvichan	Rajadamnern Stadium	Bangkok, Thailand	Decision	5	3:00
2016-09-19	Win	(Thailand) Phetchainath Sitkumnanniang	Lumpinee Stadium	Bangkok, Thailand	KO (Knees to the Body)	3	
2016-07-29	Win	(Thailand) Tukkatapeth Sor Kiatniwat	TOYOTA Hilux Revo Super Champ in Japan	Tokyo, Japan	Decision (Unanimous)	5	3:00
Defends the 112lbs Thailand title.
2016-06-19	Loss	(Thailand) Phetmuangchon Por.Suantong	Wanchai+Kingthong MuayThai Super Fight	Nagoya, Japan	Decision (Unanimous)	5	3:00
2016-05-03	Loss	(Thailand) Phetsuphan Por.Daorungruang	Suk Daurung Yutahatti	Suphan Buri Province, Thailand	Decision	5	3:00
2016	Loss	(Thailand) Panpon Sor Waritar		Saraburi, Thailand	Decision	5	3:00
2016-03-07	Loss	(Thailand) Ruangdet Sakvichian	Rajadamnern Stadium	Bangkok, Thailand	Decision	5	3:00
2016-01-13	Loss	(Thailand) Thanadet Thor.Pran 49	Rajadamnern Stadium	Bangkok, Thailand	Decision	5	3:00
2015-12-08	Win	(Thailand) Thanadet Thor.Pran 49	Lumpinee Stadium	Bangkok, Thailand	Decision	5	3:00
Wins the 112lbs Thailand title.
2015-11-06	Win	(Thailand) Kwandom Tor.Minburi	Lumpinee Stadium	Bangkok, Thailand	Decision	5	3:00
Wins 1 million baht side-bet.
2015-09-20	Win	(Thailand) Petyasor Dabrunsakarm	Lat Phrao Boxing Stadium	Thailand	Decision	5	3:00
2015-08-20	Win	(Thailand) Saenchainoi Rayornetnakorn	Rajadamnern Stadium	Bangkok, Thailand	Decision	5	3:00
2015-07-20	Loss	(Thailand) Theptaksin Sor.Sonsing	Rajadamnern Stadium	Bangkok, Thailand	Decision	5	3:00
2015-05-25	Loss	(Thailand) Kankaoden Farongnamkan	Rajadamnern Stadium	Bangkok, Thailand	Decision	5	3:00
2015-04-08	Win	(Thailand) Sanchanchai Raioinetnakhorn	Rajadamnern Stadium	Bangkok, Thailand	Decision	5	3:00
2015-03-17	Win	(Cambodia) Noppadon Petputong	Miracle Muaythai	Ayutthaya, Thailand	Decision (Unanimous)	5	3:00
Wins the WPMF World Flyweight title.
2015-02-05	Win	(Thailand) Petdam Sitkaensak	Rajadamnern Stadium	Bangkok, Thailand	Decision	5	3:00
2014-12-20	Loss	(China) Ho Kwok Ken	TOPKING WORLD SERIES HONG KONG	Hong Kong	Decision	5	3:00
2014-11-01	Loss	(Cambodia) Noppadon Petputon	Svay Rieng Stadium	Cambodia	Decision	5	3:00
2014-09-28	Win	(Japan) Ryuji Wakayama		Sendai Japan	Decision (Split)	5	3:00
2014-08-28	Win	(Thailand) Pradudam Por.Ruangrun	Rajadamnern Stadium	Bangkok, Thailand	KO	3	
2014-08-04	Loss	(Thailand) Pradudam Por.Ruangrun	Rajadamnern Stadium	Bangkok, Thailand	Decision	5	3:00
2014-07-09	Win	(Thailand) Fahsun Sor.Sopit	Rajadamnern Stadium	Bangkok, Thailand	Decision	5	3:00
2014-05-05	Win	(Thailand) Pamphet Sitkrupak	Rajadamnern Stadium	Bangkok, Thailand	KO	4	
2013-11-07	Loss	(Thailand) Sanchanchai Raioinetnakhorn	Lat Phrao Boxing Stadium	Thailand	Decision	5	3:00
2013-08-15	Loss	(Thailand) Sanchanchai Raioinetnakhorn	Rajadamnern Stadium	Bangkok, Thailand	Decision	5	3:00
2013-07-07	Win	(Japan) Shoya Saito	Senjou 10 League 22 Dragonboxing	Japan	Decision	3	3:00
2013-04-10	Win	(Thailand) Densin Sor Sorpit	Rajadamnern Stadium	Bangkok, Thailand	KO	4	
2013-03-30	Win	(Thailand) Hantalay Rungportong		Thailand	Decision	5	2:00
2013-02-24	Win	(Japan) Ryosuke Kumai	HOOST CUP Spirits 2	Nagoya, Japan	TKO (Doctor Stoppage)	3	
2012-08-12	Win	(Thailand) Petek Lukforungket		Thailand	Decision	5	2:00
2012-04-07	Loss	(Thailand) Singnon Sitjapun		Thailand	KO	4	
2012-02-18	Loss	(Thailand) Narongrit Wor.Sentep	Lumpinee Stadium	Bangkok, Thailand	Decision		
2011-11-09	Win	(Thailand) Petek Porngket	Rajadamnern Stadium	Bangkok, Thailand	Decision	5	2:00
2011-08-19	Loss	(Thailand) Narongrit Wor.Sentep	Lumpinee Stadium	Bangkok, Thailand	Decision	5	3:00
Legend: Win Loss Draw/No contest Notes

Amateur Kickboxing & Muay Thai record (incomplete)
29 Wins (6 KO's) 11 Losses, 1 Draw
Date	Result	Opponent	Event	Location	Method	Round	Time
2012-11-10	Win	(Japan) Kaito Gibu	TRIBELATE Shinjuku Face	Japan	Decision	3	3:00
Wins TRIBELATE Flyweight title.
2012-09-22	Win	(Japan) Hamachi	Muay Thai Windy Super Fight 14	Tokyo, Japan	Decision	3	3:00
2012-07-01	Win	(Japan) Yuzuki Sakai	Muay Thai Windy Super Fight – NAGOYA – Muaythaiphoon 2	Nagoya, Japan	Decision	5	2:00
2012-06-10	Loss	(Japan) Yugo Flyskygym	Muay Thai Windy Super Fight 12	Japan	Decision	5	2:00
Lost Muay Thai Windy Super Fight −50kg title.
2012-04-29	Win	(Japan) Yuki Egawa	8th Kaikokusai Junior Kickboxing	Japan	Decision		2:00
2012-03	Win	(Japan) Hamachi		Japan	Decision		
2012-03-18	Win	(Japan) Kenta Yoshinaga	Muay Thai WINDY Super Fight vol.9	Japan	Decision	5	1:30
Wins Muay Thai Windy Super Fight −50kg title.
2011-12-18	Win	(Japan) Tora Wor.Wanchai	Muay Thai WINDY Super Fight vol.10 2011 FINAL	Japan	Decision	5	1:30
2011-09-23	Win	(Japan) Kaito Gibu	Muay Thai Windy Super Fight 8	Japan	KO	4	
2011-07-31	Win	(Japan) Yoshiki Takei	Muay Thai WINDY Super Fight vol.8	Japan	Ext.R Decision (Unanimous)	3	1:00
Wins Muay Thai Windy Super Fight −45kg title.
2011-07-03	Win	(Japan) Tatsuya Sakakibara	Muay Thai WINDY Super Fight in NAGOYA ～Muay Typhoon!～	Nagoya, Japan	Decision	2	2:00
2011-06-19	Win	(Japan) Hiroto Ishizuka	Muay Thai Windy Super Fight	Nagoya, Japan	KO	1	
2011-06-05	Win	(Japan) Yuya Iwanami	Muay Yoko 15, Final	Tokyo, Japan	Decision (Unanimous)		
2011-06-05	Win	(Japan) Ikki Shimizu	Muay Yoko 15, Semi Final	Tokyo, Japan	Decision (Unanimous)		
2011-04-29	Loss	(Japan) Yoshiki Takei	Muay Thai WINDY Super Fight vol.6, Semi Final	Japan	Ext.R Decision		
2011-04-02	Loss	(Japan) Tenshin Nasukawa	Muay Lok 2011 2nd	Tokyo, Japan	Decision	2	2:00
2011-02-20	Draw	(Japan) Yuichi Suenaga	Muay Lok 2011 ～1st～	Tokyo, Japan	Decision	2	2:00
2011-02-13	Win	(Japan) Kaisei Iwamoto	Muay Thai WINDY Super Fight	Kyushu, Japan	KO	2	
2010-12-05	Win	(Japan) Yuzuki Sakai	MuayThaiOpen 14	Tokyo, Japan	Decision	2	2:00
2010-11-07	Win	(Japan) Saya Ito	Muay Thai WINDY Super Fight vol.5	Tokyo, Japan	Decision	2	2:00
Defends Muay Thai Windy Super Fight −40kg title.
2010-10-	Win	(Japan) Yoshiki Takei	Final	Japan	Decision	2	1:30
2010-10-	Win	(Japan) Tatsuya Sakakibara	Semi Final	Japan	Ext.R Decision	3	1:00
2010-10-	Win	(Japan) Kazuya Kurokawa	Quarter Final	Japan	Decision	2	1:30
2010-10-	Win	(Japan) Yuzuki Sakai	First Round	Japan	Decision	2	1:30
2010-09-19	Win	(Japan) Yoshiki Takei	Muay Thai WINDY Super Fight 4	Tokyo, Japan	Decision	2	2:00
Wins Muay Thai Windy Super Fight −40kg title.
2010-09-19	Win	(Japan) Tatsuya Sakakibara	Muay Thai WINDY Super Fight 4	Tokyo, Japan	Decision	2	2:00
2010-07-11	Win	(Japan) Kota Nakano	MuayThaiOpen 12	Tokyo, Japan	Decision	2	2:00
2010-06-27	Win	(Japan) Hiroki Nishimura	BRIDGE 4th	Japan	Decision	2	2:00
2010-06-13	Loss	(Japan) Tatsuya Sakakibara	Muay Thai WINDY Super Fight 3	Japan	Decision		
2010-06-06	Win	(Japan) Maki Ishii	J-1 Grand Prix	Japan	Decision	2	2:00
2010-04-25	Win	(Japan) Misaki Yamamoto	Muay Yoko 12	Japan	Decision	2	1:30
2010-01-17	Win	(Japan) Hiroto Ishizuka	Muay Lok Junior 1	Tokyo, Japan	Decision		
Legend: Win Loss Draw/No contest Notes
