= Rangsit =

Rangsit รังสิต
- City Municipality
- City of Rangsit เทศบาลนครรังสิต
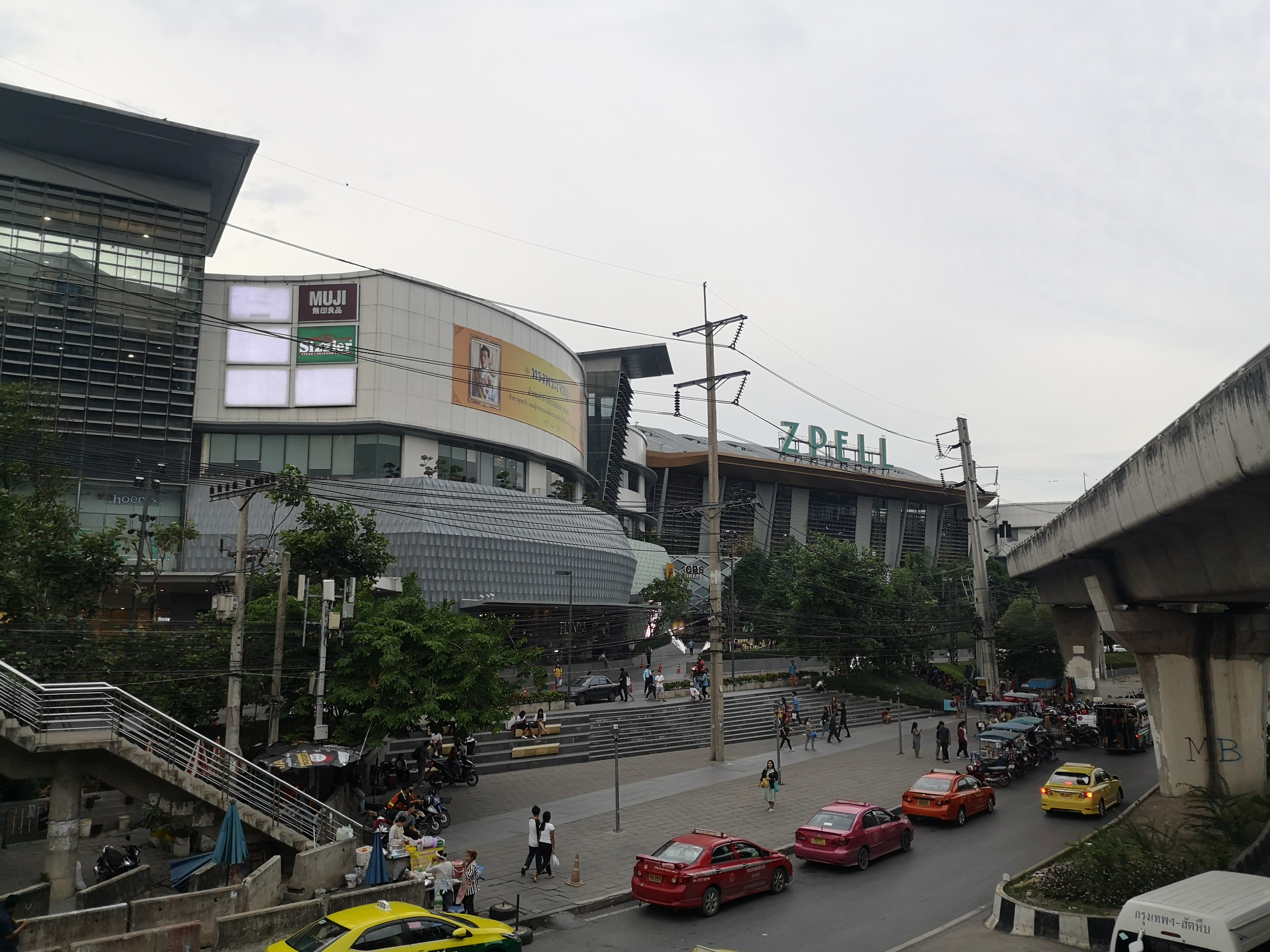
- Zpell, part of Future Park Rangsit

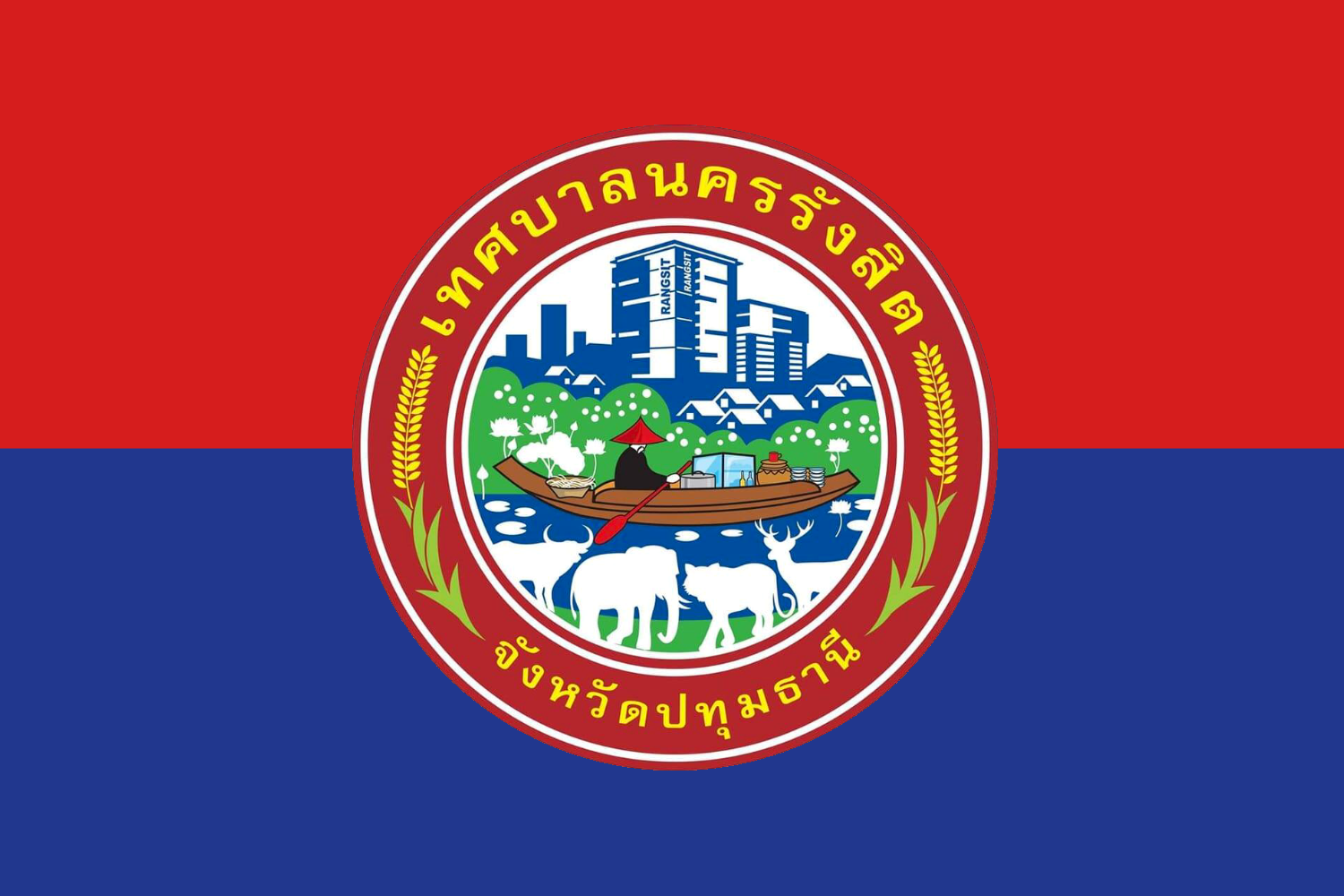
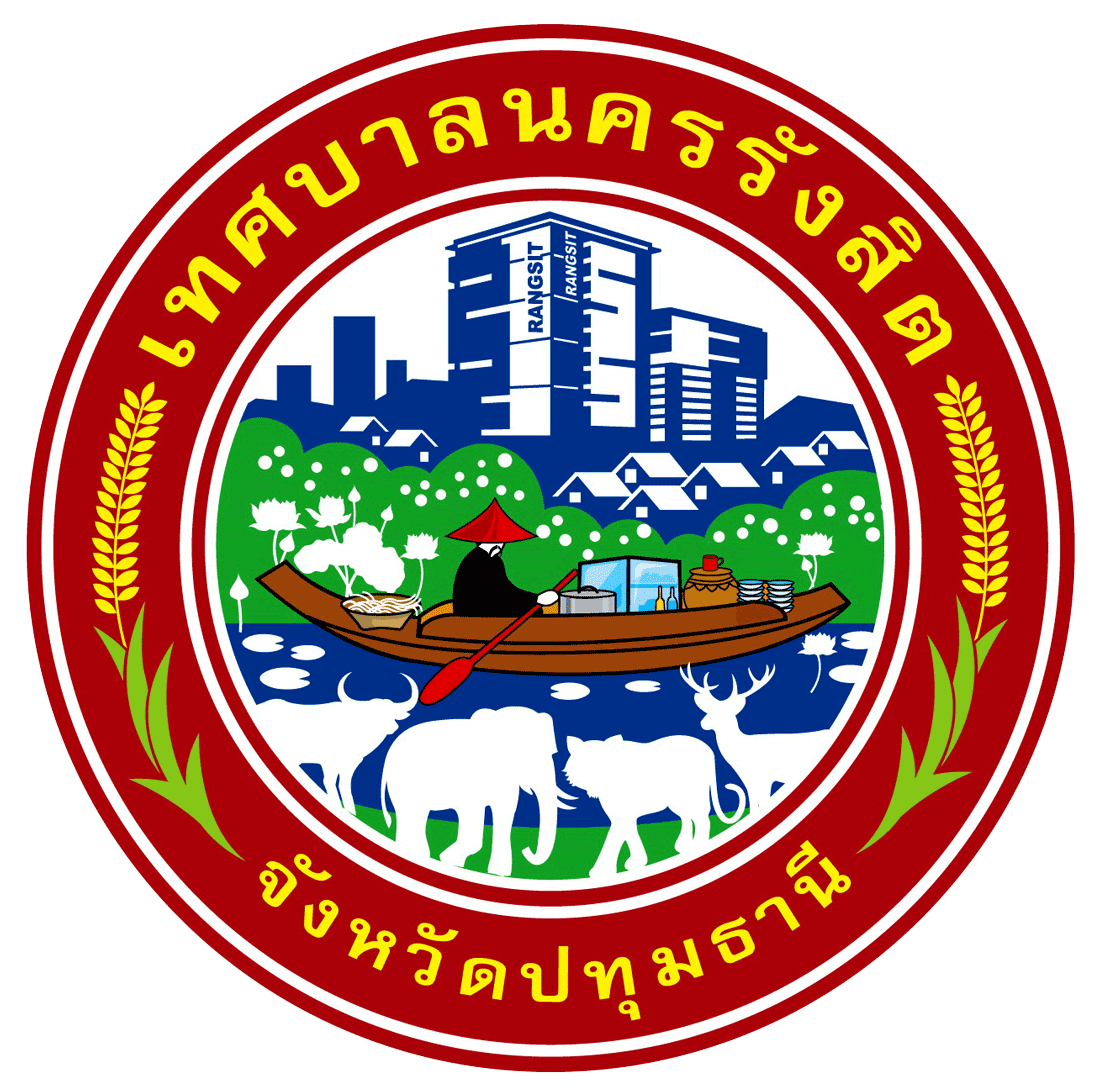
- Flag Seal

- Location in Thailand
- Coordinates: 13°59′0″N 100°37′0″E
- Country: Thailand
- Province: Pathum Thani
- District: Thanyaburi

Government
  - Type: City Municipality
  - Mayor: Treelup Thupkrachang

Area
  - Total: 20.80 km^{2} (8.03 sq mi)

Population (2014)
  - Total: 79,319
  - Density: 3,813.41/km^{2} (9,876.7/sq mi)
- Time zone: UTC+7 (ICT)
- Postcode: 12130
- Area code: (+66) 2
- Website: rangsit.org

Rangsit (Thai: รังสิต, pronounced [rāŋ.sìt]) is a city and neighbourhood in Pathum Thani Province, Thailand. Rangsit is a metropolitan city that supports the expansion of Bangkok in the north. Rangsit has become a departure point for travel to provinces in north, northeast, and eastern Thailand. The area is served by Rangsit station on the SRT Dark Red Line.

Rangsit is the home of Rangsit University. It is also the provenance of Asian Institute of Technology and Rangsit campus of Thammasat University.

== History ==
In the past, the area of Rangsit was part of a vast plain stretching from northern Bangkok and Pathum Thani to Saraburi, located on the eastern side of the Chao Phraya River. This area was known as "Thung Luang" (ทุ่งหลวง), meaning "the great field", and covered approximately 2,000 km^{²} (about 772 mi^{²}).

At that time, it was home to many species of wildlife, including wild elephants, which gave rise to the name "Tha Khlong" (ท่าโขลง), meaning "pier of elephant herds." Wild elephants from Khao Yai often roamed here. Remarkably, the area was also the only known natural habitat of the now-extinct Schomburgk's deer (Rucervus schomburgki), a medium-sized deer species.

During the reign of King Chulalongkorn (Rama V) in the mid-Rattanakosin period, Thailand's first irrigation canal, Khlong Rangsit, was constructed through this area. It was named in honor of his son, Prince Rangsit Prayurasakdi, Prince of Chainat. The canal transformed Rangsit into a prosperous agricultural region, particularly for rice cultivation and fruit orchards, including tangerines.

== Transportation ==
The area is served by Rangsit station on the State Railway of Thailand's Northern Line, Northeastern Line and Dark Red Line. The main roads are Phahonyothin Road and Vibhavadi Rangsit Road.
