= Panpayak Sitchefboontham =

Muay Thai fighter

- Born: 1995 (age 30–31); Surin Province, Thailand
- Other names: Panpayak Sitjatik; Panpayak Sor.Sommai
- Nationality: Thai
- Height: 172 cm (5 ft 8 in)
- Weight: 63.5 kg (140 lb; 10.00 st)
- Stance: Orthodox
- Fighting out of: Bangkok, Thailand

Panpayak Sitchefboontham (Thai: พันธ์พยัคฆ์ ศิษย์เชฟบุญธรรม) is a Muay Thai fighter.

== Titles and accomplishments ==
- Omnoi Stadium
  - 2015 Omnoi Stadium Shell Rimula Tournament Winner
- World Boxing Council Muaythai
  - 2017 WBC Muay Thai World 135 lbs Champion
  - 2018 WBC Muay Thai Fighter of the Year
  - 2018 WBC Muay Thai Fight of the Year (February 26 vs. Saeksan Or. Kwanmuang)
- Rajadamnern Stadium
  - 2019 Rajadamnern Stadium 140 lbs Champion

== Fight record (incomplete) ==
Date	Result	Opponent	Event	Location	Method	Round	Time
2023-09-16	Loss	(Thailand) Petchchingyuen Jitmuangnon	9 Muaydee Vitheethai, Or.Tor.Gor.3 Stadium	Nonthaburi province, Thailand	TKO (leg kick)	2	0:38
2023-04-01	Loss	(Thailand) Yod-ET Por.Tor.Thor.Thongthawee	Samui Super Fight: RuamponkonSamui, Phetchbuncha Stadium	Koh Samui, Thailand	Decision	5	
2023-01-01	Loss	(Thailand) Sakulchailek Pangkongpap	TorNamThai Kiatpetch TKO, Rajadamnern Stadium	Bangkok, Thailand	KO (Elbow)	4	
2022-09-21	Loss	(Thailand) Kulabkhao Sor.Jor.Piek U-Thai	Muay Thai Palangmai, Rajadamnern Stadium	Bangkok, Thailand	Decision	5	3:00
2022-07-16	Loss	(Thailand) Prabsuek Siopol	SuekJaoMuayThai, Omnoi Stadium	Bangkok, Thailand	Decision	5	3:00
2022-06-18	Loss	(Thailand) Sakulchailek Pangkongpap	Fairtex Fight Promotion, Lumpinee Stadium	Bangkok, Thailand	Decision (Unanimous)	3	3:00
2022-03-20	Loss	(Thailand) Yod-ET Por.Tor.Thor.Thongthawee	Chang Muaythai Kiatphet, Rajadamnern Stadium	Bangkok, Thailand	Decision	5	3:00
2022-02-06	Loss	(Thailand) Yod-IQ Or.Pimolsri	Channel 7 Stadium	Bangkok, Thailand	Decision	5	3:00
2021-12-26	Loss	(Thailand) Rambolek Sor.Tor.Watcharin	Channel 7 Stadium	Bangkok, Thailand	Decision	5	3:00
2020-10-26	Loss	(Brazil) Julio Lobo	Sitchefboontham, Rangsit Stadium	Rangsit, Thailand	KO (Elbows)	3	
2020-01-22	Loss	(Thailand) Rangkhao Wor.Sangprapai	SuekBangrachan, Rajadamnern Stadium	Bangkok, Thailand	Decision	5	3:00
2019-12-23	Loss	(Thailand) Phet Utong Or. Kwanmuang	Sitchefboontham + Sor.Sommai, Rajadamnern Stadium	Bangkok, Thailand	Decision	5	3:00
2019-11-28	Loss	(Thailand) Panpayak Jitmuangnon	Sitchefboontham, Rajadamnern Stadium	Bangkok, Thailand	Decision	5	3:00
2019-08-22	Win	(Thailand) Chamuaktong Fightermuaythai	Sor.Sommai, Rajadamnern Stadium	Bangkok, Thailand	Decision	5	3:00
Wins the Rajadamnern Stadium 140lbs Title.
2019-06-27	Loss	(Thailand) Chamuaktong Fightermuaythai	Sitchefboontham, Rajadamnern Stadium	Bangkok, Thailand	Decision	5	3:00
2019-05-16	Win	(Thailand) Thaksinlek Kiatniwat	Muay Thai Rajadamnern + Chefboontham, Rajadamnern Stadium	Bangkok, Thailand	KO (Left Elbow)	4	
2019-03-07	Win	(Thailand) Thaksinlek Kiatniwat	Muay Thai Rajadamnern + Jitmuangnon, Rajadamnern Stadium	Bangkok, Thailand	Decision	5	3:00
2019-02-07	Loss	(Thailand) Phonek Or.Kwanmuang	Sitchefboontham, Rajadamnern Stadium	Bangkok, Thailand	Decision	5	3:00
2018-12-21	Loss	(Thailand) Muangthai PKSaenchaimuaythaigym	Muay Thai Rajadamnern + Sor.Sommai, Rajadamnern Stadium	Bangkok, Thailand	Decision	5	
2018-11-15	Loss	(Thailand) Saeksan Or. Kwanmuang	Rajadamnern Stadium	Bangkok, Thailand	Decision	5	3:00
For the vacant Rajadamnern Stadium Lightweight title (135 lbs).
2018-10-22	Win	(Thailand) Thaksinlek Kiatniwat	Rajadamnern Stadium	Bangkok, Thailand	KO (Left Elbow)	3	
2018-09-06	Loss	(Thailand) Nuenglanlek Jitmuangnon	Rajadamnern Stadium	Bangkok, Thailand	Decision	5	3:00
2018-07-14	Win	(Thailand) Yodpanomrung Jitmuangnon	Rajadamnern Stadium	Bangkok, Thailand	Decision	5	3:00
2018-06-14	Win	(Thailand) Yodpanomrung Jitmuangnon	Rajadamnern Stadium	Bangkok, Thailand	Decision	5	3:00
2018-03-22	Loss	(Thailand) Saeksan Or. Kwanmuang	Rajadamnern Stadium	Bangkok, Thailand	Decision	5	3:00
2018-02-26	Win	(Thailand) Saeksan Or. Kwanmuang	Rajadamnern Stadium	Bangkok, Thailand	Decision	5	3:00
Defends WBC Muay Thai 135lbs title.
2017-12-21	Loss	(Thailand) Saeksan Or. Kwanmuang	Rajadamnern Stadium	Bangkok, Thailand	Decision	5	3:00
For the IBF Muay Thai 135lbs title.
2017-11-13	Win	(Thailand) Extra Sitworaphat	Rajadamnern Stadium	Bangkok, Thailand	Decision	5	3:00
2017-09-11	Loss	(Thailand) Yodlekpet Or. Pitisak	Rajadamnern Stadium	Bangkok, Thailand	KO	3	
For the Rajadamnern Stadium 135lbs Title.
2017-05-25	Win	(Thailand) Phet Utong Or. Kwanmuang	Rajadamnern Stadium	Bangkok, Thailand	KO (Left Elbow)	3	
2017-03-29	Loss	(Thailand) Yodlekpet Or. Pitisak	Rajadamnern Stadium	Bangkok, Thailand	Decision	5	3:00
2017-02-23	Win	(Thailand) Phonek Or.Kwanmuang	Rajadamnern Stadium	Bangkok, Thailand	Decision	5	3:00
Wins vacant WBC Muay Thai 135lbs Title.
2017-01-01	Win	(Thailand) Phonek Or.Kwanmuang	Rajadamnern Stadium	Bangkok, Thailand	Decision	5	3:00
2016-11-24	Win	(Thailand) Yok Parunchai	Rajadamnern Stadium	Bangkok, Thailand	Decision	5	3:00
2016-09-23	Loss	(Thailand) Yodlekpet Or. Pitisak	Lumpinee Stadium	Bangkok, Thailand	KO (Left Knee to the Body)	3	
2016-08-22	Win	(Thailand) Phonek Or.Kwanmuang	Rajadamnern Stadium	Bangkok, Thailand	Decision	5	3:00
2016-07-18	Loss	(Thailand) Yodlekpet Or. Pitisak	Rajadamnern Stadium	Bangkok, Thailand	KO (Right Hook)	4	
2016-06-24	Loss	(Thailand) Bangpleenoi Petchyindee Academy	Lumpinee Stadium	Bangkok, Thailand	Decision	5	3:00
2016-03-10	Loss	(Thailand) Phet Utong Or. Kwanmuang	Rajadamnern Stadium	Bangkok, Thailand	Decision	5	3:00
2016-01-29	Win	(Thailand) Phet Utong Or. Kwanmuang	Rajadamnern Stadium	Bangkok, Thailand	Decision	5	3:00
2015-12-23	Loss	(Thailand) Thanonchai Thanakorngym	Rajadamnern Stadium	Bangkok, Thailand	Decision	5	3:00
2015-11-10	Win	(Thailand) Rodlek Jaotalaytong	Lumpinee Stadium	Bangkok, Thailand	Decision	5	3:00
2015-09-23	Win	(Thailand) Fasatan Sitwatcharachai	Rajadamnern Stadium	Bangkok, Thailand	KO	4	
2015-07-15	Win	(Thailand) Phonek Or.Kwanmuang	Rajadamnern Stadium	Bangkok, Thailand	Decision	5	3:00
2015-06-10	Loss	(Thailand) Phonek Or.Kwanmuang	Rajadamnern Stadium	Bangkok, Thailand	Decision	5	3:00
2015-05-07	Win	(Thailand) Kongdanai Sor.Sommai	Rajadamnern Stadium	Bangkok, Thailand	Decision	5	3:00
2015-03-07	Win	(Thailand) Kaonar P.K.SaenchaiMuaythaiGym	Siam Omnoi Stadium	Samut Sakhon, Thailand	Decision	5	3:00
Wins the Shell Rimula Tournament
2015-01-17	Win	(Thailand) Mongkolkaew Sor.Sommai	Siam Omnoi Stadium	Samut Sakhon, Thailand	Decision	5	3:00
2014-10-25	Win	(Thailand) Intrachai Chor.Hapayak	Siam Omnoi Stadium	Samut Sakhon, Thailand	KO	3	
2014-09-20	Win	(Thailand) Kaonar P.K.SaenchaiMuaythaiGym	Siam Omnoi Stadium	Samut Sakhon, Thailand	KO	3	
2013-08-22	Loss	(Thailand) Surachai Srisuriyanyothin	Rajadamnern Stadium	Bangkok, Thailand	Decision	5	3:00
For the vacant Rajadamnern Stadium 122 lbs title
Legend: Win Loss Draw/No contest Notes
