= Rajadamnern Stadium =

Stadium in Bangkok, Thailand

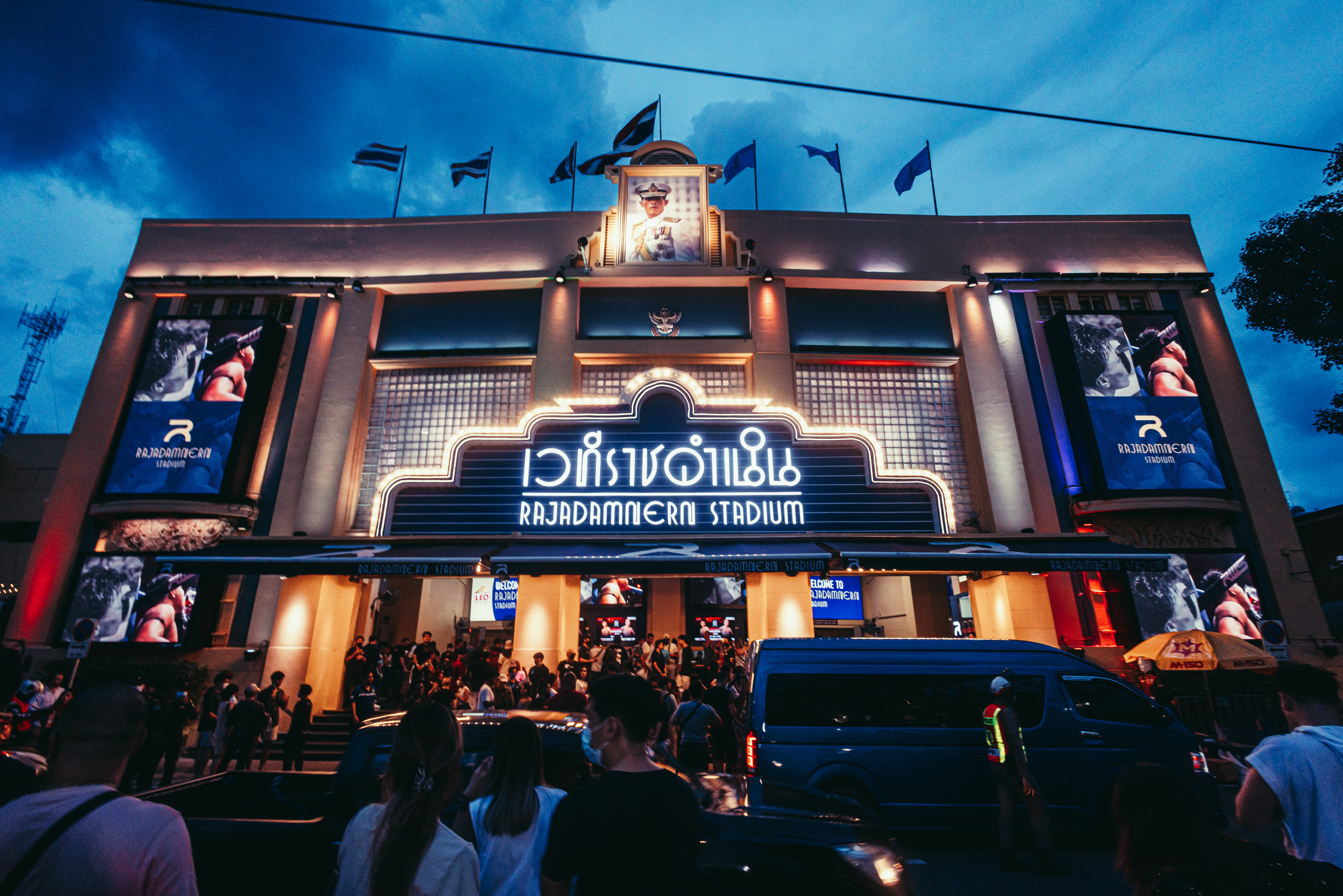
- Rajadamnern Stadium
- Interactive map of Rajadamnern Stadium
- Location: 1, Ratchadamnoen Avenue, Khet Pom Prap Sattru Phai, Bangkok, Thailand
- Coordinates: 13°45′40″N 100°30′32″E
- Owner: Global Sport Ventures Co., Ltd., The Rajadamnern Co. Ltd
- Operator: Global Sport Ventures Co., Ltd.
- Capacity: 3,078

Construction
- Groundbreaking: 1 March 1941
- Built: 1941-1945
- Opened: 23 December 1945
- Expanded: 1951
- Cost: 258,900 baht
- Main contractor: Imprese Italiane All' Estero-Oriente

Tenants
- Global Sport Ventures Co., Ltd.

Website
- muaythaiallinone.com

Rajadamnern Stadium (Thai: สนามมวยราชดำเนิน, RTGS: Sanam Muai Ratchadamnoen, IPA: [sànǎːm mūaj râːtt͡ɕʰàdāmnɤ̄ːn]) is a sporting arena in Bangkok, Thailand. Along with Lumpinee Boxing Stadium, Rajadamnern is one of the two main stadiums for modern Muay Thai. It hosts fights every day from Monday to Sunday. The stadium has its own ranking system and championship titles up to middleweight (160 lbs).

== History ==
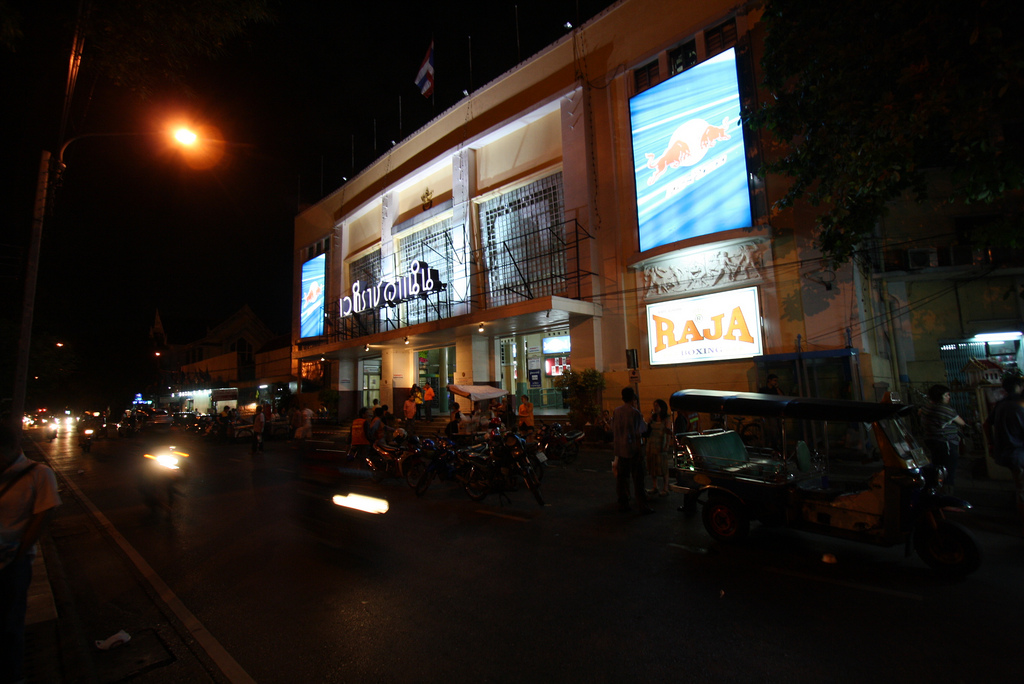
Rajadamnern stadium in 2009

In 1941, the prime minister of Thailand, Field Marshal Plaek Phibunsongkhram, gave orders to build a national boxing stadium on Rajadamnern Avenue. Impresse Italiane All' Estero-Oriente won the construction rights, and the 258,900 baht project foundation stone was laid on 1 March 1941.

Due to the lack of construction supplies during World War II, the project was halted until August 1945. When construction resumed, it took only four months to complete it. The first boxing match was held on 23 December 1945. Tickets were priced at between 70 and 300 baht. Pramote Puengsoonthorn became the first stadium manager and remained in the post until his retirement in 1947.

The original stadium was open-air, resembling a Roman amphitheatre in design. Six years later, in 1951 a concrete roof was added, making it weather-proof. After seven years of government ownership, the stadium was losing money, and on 24 May 1953, Chalerm Cheosakul, the stadium manager at the time, asked permission from the Crown Property Bureau to run the stadium and founded the "Rajadamnern Co, Ltd." Rajadamnern Co., Ltd. operates it to this day, and it has become one of the chief muay Thai boxing stadiums in Thailand.

In 1984, Rajadamnern Stadium ranked the top 10 Muay Thai fighters of all time, as follows:

1. Pon Phrapradaeng
2. Suk Prasarthinpimai
3. Chuchai Phrakanchai
4. Prayut Udomsak
5. Adul Srisorthon
6. Apidej Sit-Hirun
7. Vicharnnoi Porntawee
8. Poot Lorlek
9. Pudpadnoi Worawut
10. Dieselnoi Chor.Thanasukarn

Chuwattana Muay Thai & Boxing camp is the official promoter for Rajadamnern Stadium, licensed by the Thailand Boxing Commission.

In 2022, Global Sport Ventures Company Limited or GSV, an affiliated company of Plan B Media Public Company Limited, announced its investment in Rajadamnern Stadium Company Limited. The investment aims to revolutionize and introduce "The New Era of MuayThai" to new generation of sports fan around the world by building Rajadamnern Stadium to be a Global Hub of MuayThai and modernizing media & content strategy. GSV collaborates with leading MuayThai promoters in hosting fights at the stadium.

In late 2022 GSV launched Rajadamnern World Series or RWS, its flagship MuayThai program with a modernized set of fighting rules and world class production quality. As part of Rajadamnern World Series, on 22 July 2022, Rajadamnern Stadium hosted the first four female Muay Thai fights in its almost eight decade-long history. The first female bout was between Aida Looksaikongdin and Zahra Shokouhi. In June 2023, it was announced that RWS had signed a deal with DAZN to distribute their events across the world, starting from their event on the first of July 2023.

== Gambling ==
Gambling is legal and takes place at the second level. The betting is done by hand-signals, as on a stock exchange trading floor. Often such signs are misunderstood by one side and fights may erupt outside the ring between gamblers. The security service at Rajadamnern Stadium is managed by armed military police. Foreigners usually occupy the expensive ringside seats, while gamblers and aficionados prefer the second or third ring of seats upstairs.

== Weight classes ==
Rajadamnern Stadium offers the official weight classes below:

Weight class name	Upper limit			Gender
Weight class name	in pounds (lb)	in kilograms (kg)	in stone (st)	Gender
Minimumweight/Mini flyweight	105	47.6	7.5	Male / Female
Light flyweight	108	49.1	7.7	Male
Flyweight	112	50.8	8	Male / Female
Super flyweight	115	52.2	8.2	Male
Bantamweight	118	53.5	8.4	Male / Female
Super bantamweight	122	55.3	12.1	Male
Featherweight	126	57.2	9	Male / Female
Super featherweight	130	59	9.3	Male
Lightweight	135	61.2	9.6	Male
Super lightweight	140	63.5	10	Male
Welterweight	147	66.7	10.5	Male
Super welterweight	154	69.9	11	Male
Middleweight	160	72.6	11.4	Male
Super middleweight	168	76.2	12	Male
Light heavyweight	175	79.4	12.5	Male
Super light heavyweight	182	82.6	13	Male
Cruiserweight	190	86.2	13.6	Male
Heavyweight	210	95.6	15	Male
Super heavyweight	Unlimited	Unlimited	Unlimited	Male

== Current champions ==
Weight Class	Champion	Date won	Days	Defences
Minimumweight	Singhasurat Or.UdUdon	June 4, 2026	170	0
Light Flyweight	Duan99 SorJor.TongPrachin	August 23, 2025	455	1
Flyweight	Jigsaw NayoksoywiangyongLamphun	August 15, 2024	828	4
Super Flyweight	Petchdet Wor.Sangprapai	November 22, 2025	364	3
Bantamweight	Jaroensuk BoonlannaMuaythai	August 30, 2025	448	2
Super Bantamweight	Petchsila Wor.Auracha	April 18, 2026	217	1
Featherweight	Narak BanglongAutoMax	July 18, 2026	126	0
Super Featherweight	Chaila Por.Lakboon	Novermber 8, 2026	13	0
Lightweight	Kan Nakamura	October 10, 2026	42	0
Super Lightweight	Dam Parunchai	March 2, 2024	994	3
Welterweight	Niall McGreevy	July 11, 2026	133	0
Super Welterweight	Daniel SinbiMuayThai	June 1, 2022	1634	5
Middleweight	Dani Rodriguez	September 26, 2026	56	0
Female Bantamweight	Bryony Soden	September 19, 2026	63	0
Female Flyweight	Marie Ruumet	February 28, 2026	266	3
Female Minimumweight	Mongkutpetch Praepaofah	April 5, 2025	595	2

== Fighter of the Year history (incomplete) ==
Year	Fighter
1988	Klaisuwit Sunkilanongkhee
1989	
1990	
1991	Khomphet Lukprabat
1992	Silapathai Jockygym
1993	Veeraphol Sahaprom
1994	Choengnoen Sitphutthapim
1995	Fighta PalanGroup
1996	Chutin Por.Tawachai
1997	Muangfahlek Kiatwichian
1998	Chaomailek Sor.Thantawan
1999	Chanrit Sit-O
2000	Watcharachai Kaewsamrit
2001	Thongchai Tor.Silachai
2002	
2003	Puja Sor.Suwanee
2004	Anuwat Kaewsamrit
2005	Linglom Tor.Chalermchai
2006	Jomthong Chuwattana
2007	Chatchainoi Sitbenjama
2008	Jomthong Chuwattana
2009	Jomthong Chuwattana
2010	Singtongnoi Por.Telakun
2011	Detkart Por.Pongsawang
2012	Sangmanee Sor.Tienpo
2013	
2014	Superbank Mor Ratanabandit
2015	Saeksan Or. Kwanmuang
2016	Puenkon Tor.Surat
2017	Phetwason Or.Daokrajai
2018	Rungkit Wor.Sanprapai
2019	Saotho Sitchefboontham
2020	Not awarded
2021	
2022	Flukenoi Kiatfahlikit
2023	Lamnamoonlek Tded99
2024	Khunsueklek Boomdeksian
2025	Duan99 SorJor.TongPrachin

== Championship history (incomplete) ==
=== Minimumweight Championship ===
Weight limit: 105 lb (47.6 kg)

Name	Date	Defenses
(Thailand) Ronachai Sunkilanongkhee (def. Pannoi Sakornpitak)	December 23, 1976	
Inaugural champion.
(Thailand) Wangwonnoi Lukmatulee (def. Ronachai Sunkilanongkhee)	March 25, 1977	
Wangwonnoi vacated the title in 1977.
(Thailand) Samernai Kietsongkram (def. Phanmongkol Hor.Mahachai)	September 9, 1977	drew with Jakrawan Kiatisaktewan on June 2, 1978.
(Thailand) Prabpipop Lukkhlongtan (def. Samernai Kietsongkram)	October 31, 1979	
The title was vacant as of October 1980.
(Thailand) Chamuekpet Hapalang (def. Kiophit Chuwattana)	October 29, 1980	def. Lankrung Kiatkriankgrai on July 23, 1981
Chamuekpet vacated the title in 1981.
(Thailand) Maewnoi Singjakrawat (def. Payapnoi Sor.Thanikul)	July 14, 1982	
Maewnoi was stripped of the title on July 23, 1983, after he was dismissed in the last round of a title fight against Boonkerd Fairtex.
(Thailand) Boonkerd Fairtex (def. Daengnoi Lukprabat)	1983	
(Thailand) Songwannoi Sitsahaphan (def. Boonkerd Fairtex)	November 1983	def. Sahatchai Kiatkhanarom on August 1984
Songwannoi was stripped of the title after failing to defend it within the required period in 1985.
(Thailand) Warunee Sor.Ploenjit (def. Phed Na Ratchawat)	June 3, 1985	drew with Daotrang Tor.Boonlert September 30, 1985
(Thailand) Maewpa Suanmiskawan (def. Warunee Sor.Ploenjit)	January 30, 1987	def. Warunee Sor.Ploenjit in 1987
Maewpa vacated the title in 1988.
(Thailand) Dentaksin Kiatrattapon (def. Maewpa Suanmiskawan)	March 24, 1988	
Dentaksin vacated the title in 1988.
(Thailand) Songkram Por.Paoin (def. Saksri Yutthakit)	June 5, 1989	def. Haruhot Saktawee on July 9, 1989; def. Khamron Sor.Worapin on July 27, 1989
(Thailand) Robert Kaennorasing (def. Songkram Por.Paoin)	September 27, 1989	
Robert vacated the title in 1989.
(Thailand) Songkram Por.Paoin (2) (def. Deenueng Thor.Pattanakit)	February 11, 1990	def. Chuchai Kiatchansing on March 29, 1990
(Thailand) Khaimuktae Sitkuanyim (def. Songkram Por.Paoin)	June 30, 1990	def. Songkram Por.Paoin on August 15, 1990
Khaimuktae was stripped of the title in October 1990 after failing to make weight for a defense against Khwanna Tor.Boonlert.
(Thailand) Songkram Por.Paoin (3) (def. Yokphet Lukphrabat)	November 14, 1990	
(Thailand) Khomsan Saknarin (def. Songkram Por.Paoin)	December 9, 1990	
(Thailand) Songkram Por.Paoin (4) (def. Khomsan Saknarin)	January 30, 1991	def. Denweha Sitkrupat on 1991; def. Jery Laothaicharoen on June 17, 1991; def. Chetha Majestic on November 13, 1991; def. Khamson Sor.Worapin in 1991
(Thailand) Saksri Yutthakit (def. Songkram Por.Paoin)	February 19, 1992	
(Thailand) Songkram Por.Paoin (5) (def. Saksri Yutthakit)	July 29, 1992	def. Wiratnoi Singchachawan on September 28, 1992
Songkram vacated the title in 1993.
(Thailand) Plathong Jockygym (def. Singsamphan Kiatsingnoi)	June 30, 1993	
(Thailand) Saksri Yutthakit (2) (def. Plathong JockyGym)	September 1, 1993	
(Thailand) Wongkod Lukprabaht (def. Saksri Yutthakit)	October 6, 1993	
(Thailand) Singsamphan Kiatsingnoi (def. Wongkod Lukprabaht)	December 22, 1993	def. Chanchai Sarina on February 6, 1995
(Thailand) Samliam Singmanee (def. Singsamphan Kiatsingnoi)	September 26, 1995	
(Thailand) Singsamphan Kiatsingnoi (2) (def. )	1996	def. Terdthailek Sarina on August 28, 1996
(Thailand) Jadet Sor.Boonnak (def. Singsamphan Kiatsingnoi)	October 13, 1997	
(Thailand) Denchai Lukbanyai (def. Chaded Sor.Bunnak)	1997-1998	
Denchai vacated the title in 1998.
(Thailand) Anuwat Kaewsamrit (def. Klangsuan Sasiprapagym)	November 18, 1998	
Anuwat vacated the title in 1999.
(Thailand) Roicheng Sor.Ruangsiri (def. Morakotdaeng Sitamnuay)	1999	
Roicheng vacated the title in 2000.
(Thailand) Chanasuk S.K.V Gym (def. )	2000	
(Thailand) Nampetch Sor.Tantip (def. )	July, 2004	
(Thailand) Panfah Sor.Damrongrit (def. )	2005	
Panfah vacated the title in 2005.
(Thailand) Palangpon Piriyanoppachai (def. )	2005	
(Thailand) Binla Meenayothin (def. Palangpon Piriyanoppachai)	January 19, 2006	
Binla vacated in 2006.
(Thailand) Soodpatapee Detrat (def. Pakorn Sakyothin)	October, 2007	
(Thailand) Teva Sitkunma (def. )	2008	
Teva vacated the title 2009.
(Thailand) Fahsawang Tor.Siangtiennoi (def. Yodprabsuek Sittanaiodd)	November 26, 2009	
Fahsawang vacated the title 2010.
(Thailand) Prajanchai Por.Phetnamtong (def. Tiankao Tor.Sangtiennoi)	June 10, 2010	
(Thailand) Superbank Mor Ratanabandit (def. Prajanchai Por.Phetnamtong)	September 15, 2010	
Superbank vacated the title 2011.
(Thailand) Prajanchai Por.Phetnamtong (2) (def. Tee-Us Kor.Rachada)	February 21, 2011	
(Thailand) Detkart Por.Pongsawang (def. Prajanchai Por.Phetnamtong)	April 25, 2011	
Detkart vacated the title in July 2011.
(Thailand) Phet Lookmakarmwan (def. )	2012	
Phet vacated the title 2012.
(Thailand) Panpayak Jitmuangnon (def. Detkart Por.Pongsawang)	September 20, 2012	def. Yodmanoot Petpotong on January 17, 2013
Panpayak vacated the title in 2013.
(Thailand) Sanchai Tor.Laksong (def. Kumandoi Petcharoenvit)	February 21, 2013	
(Thailand) Phetmuangchon Por.Suantong (def. Sanchai Tor.Laksong)	August 5, 2013	
Phetmuangchon vacated the title in 2014.
(Thailand) Ongree Sor.Dechapan (def. Rit Jitmuangnon)	August 11, 2014	
Ongree vacated the title in 2014.
(Thailand) Yodbuadaeng Sor.Sirilak (def. Ongree Sor.Dechapan)	August 6, 2015	
Yodbuadaeng vacated the title in 2016.
(Thailand) Anuwat Natkinpa (def. Kaodaeng Sujibamikiew)	October 13, 2016	
(Thailand) Saengtawan Chor.Hapayak (def. Anuwat Natkinpa)	March 1, 2017	
Saengtawan vacated the title in 2017.
(Thailand) Fahbunmee BirdRangsit (def. Kumantong Chor.Hapayak)	June 15, 2017	
Fahbunmee vacated the title 2017.
(Thailand) Wanmawin Phumpanmuang (def. )	2018	
Wanmawin vacated the title in 2018.
(Thailand) Hercules Phetsimean (def. Ittipon Lookkhlongtan)	July 26, 2018	
(Japan) Nadaka Yoshinari (def. Hercules Phetsimean)	December 9, 2018	
Yoshinari vacated the title in May 2019 in order to move to light flyweight.
(Japan) Ryuya Okuwaki (def. Mungkornyok AnnyMuayThai)	September 9, 2019	
Okuwaki vacated the title in February 2020.
(Thailand) Rittidet Sitkrudet (def. Superbright Por.Pikanes)	September 23, 2020	
The title was retired in 2021 due to the COVID-19 pandemic..
(Thailand) Petchpanat Nor.AnuwatGym (def. Nuapayak Wor.Sungprapai)	February 17, 2022	
Petchpanat vacated the title in 2022.
(Thailand) Laempo Sitkhunwasan (def. Mungkornpetch Por.Muanchai)	September 22, 2022	
Laempo vacated the title in 2023.
(Thailand) Chalamchon SamartPayakaroonGym (def. Denpadang Daengrotdee)	May 11, 2023	def. Dokmaifah Rodsuijajetsaiprew on November 30, 2023
(Thailand) Duan99 SorJor.Tongprachin (def. Chalamchon SamartPayakaroonGym)	February 1, 2024	
(Thailand) Chalamchon SamartPayakaroonGym (2) (def. Duan99 SorJor.Tongprachin)	May 23, 2024	
(Thailand) Phettaweechai Fightermuaythai (def. Chalamchon SamartPayakaroonGym)	November 14, 2024	
Phettaweechai vacated the title in 2025.
(Thailand) Chalamchon Or.Thepsupha (3) (def. Sungfah Nor.Anuwatgym)	March 1, 2025	
(Thailand) Kradooklek Or.Atchariya (def. Sungfah nor.AnuwatGym for the interim title)	May 3, 2025	
(Thailand) Kradooklek Or.Atchariya (def. Chalamchon Or.Thepsupha)	August 2, 2025	
(Thailand) Chalamchon Or.Thepsupha (4) (def. Kradooklek Or.Atchariya)	December 13, 2025	
Chalamchon vacated the title in 2026.
(Thailand) Singhasurat Or.UdUdon (def. TapThai YuttakanMuayThai for the interim title)	March 28, 2026	def. LaoStar Kiattongyot on May 30, 2026; def. Knotmai Wor. Auracha on November 14, 2026

=== Light Flyweight Championship ===
Weight limit: 108 lb (49.0 kg)

Name	Date	Defenses
(Thailand) Raklek Chutinawee (def. Lomnao Thepphaksin)	November 22, 1973	
Raklek vacated the title in 1974.
(Thailand) Singnum Phetthanin (def. Nongrak Singkrungthon)	December 18, 1974	
The title was vacant as of June 1, 1975.
(Thailand) Fuangnoi Rojsongkhram (def. )	1977	
Fuangnoi vacated the title in 1977.
(Thailand) Sornnarai Sakwitthaya (def. Yodded Singsornthong)	October 31, 1977	
(Thailand) Khaokrachang Loekchai (def. Sornnarai Sakwitthaya)	1978	
The title was vacant as of 1978.
(Thailand) Chancheing Bor.Kor.Sor (def. Sira Singthong)	August 28, 1978	
(Thailand) Sornnarai Sakwitthaya (2) (def. Prankrungnoi Wangchomphun)	1978–1979	def. Bandasak Phorntawee; def. Niyom Lukmatulee
(Thailand) Prathep Kiatsingnoi (def. Samernai Kietsongkram)	October 9, 1980	def. Den Chuwattana on April 29, 1981.
(Thailand) Namphon Chomphuthong (def. Arwut Sor.Thanikul)	January 12, 1983	drew with Singnoi Petchthanin on July 8, 1983.
(Thailand) Sakawphet Kiatphetnoi (def. Namphon Chomphuthong)	May 7, 1983	
(Thailand) Fahlan Lukprabat (def. Singnoi Petchthanin)	October 28, 1985	
(Thailand) Wanghin Por.Chaiwat (def. Fahlan Lukprabat)	August 11, 1986	
(Thailand) Veeraphol Sahaprom (def. Pewphong Sitbobai)	October 12, 1987	
Veeraphol vacated the title in 1988.
(Thailand) Saeksan Sitjomthong (def. Paennoi Chuwattana)	July 27, 1988	
(Thailand) Paennoi Chuwattana (def. Saeksan Sitjomthong)	1989	def. Sahatsachai Kiatprawit on March 21, 1990
Paennoi vacated the title in 1991.
(Thailand) Khaimuktae Sitkuanyim (def. Deung Thor.Phatthanakit)	January 1991	
(Thailand) Namkabuan Ratchapeutkafe (def. Khaimuktae Sitkuanyim)	May 27, 1991	
(Thailand) Silapathai Jockygym (def. Namkabuan Ratchapeutkafe)	December 23, 1991	def. Thongchai Sor.Korakot on March 30, 1992
Silapathai vacated the title in 1992.
(Thailand) Choengnoen Sitphutthapim (def. Wiratnoi Singchatchawan)	1992-1993	
Choengnoen vacated the title in 1993.
(Thailand) Panthong Honghaocafe (def. Chatchai Phetnamchai)	July 21, 1993	
(Thailand) Chatchai Sor.Suwanpakdee (def. )	1993	
(Thailand) Plathong Jockygym (def. Chatchai Sor.Suwanpakdee)	November 10, 1993	
(Thailand) Fighta Palangroup (def. Plathong Jockygym)	November 23, 1994	
(Thailand) Ranong Saengmorakot (def. )	1994-1995	
(Thailand) Sanphet P.K.Gym (def. Ranong Saengmorakot)	February 6, 1995	
(Thailand) Lukdod Sor.Tamarangsri (def. Sanphet P.K.Gym)	April 12, 1995	def. Panomrung Kiatkormluang on May 31, 1995
(Thailand) Fighta Palangroup (2) (def. Lukdod Sor.Tamarangsri)	September 27, 1995	
Fighta vacated the title in 1997.
(Thailand) Chanrit Sit-O (def. Noppakao Sor.Wanachai)	December 24, 1997	
Chanrit vacated the title in 1998.
(Thailand) Saenchoenglek Jirakriangkrai (def. Saenkeng Sor.Thanatawan)	1998	
(Thailand) Chaomailek Sor.Thantawan (def. Saenchoenglek Jirakriangkrai)	September 9, 1998	
Chaomailek vacated the title in 1999.
(Thailand) Anuwat Kaewsamrit (def. Kayasit Sakmuangklaeng)	June 10, 1999	
Anuwat vacated the title in 1999.
(Thailand) Nopdetlek Chuwattana (def. Yodkriangkrai Thor.Liwkhachonsak)	February 2, 2000	
(Thailand) Samrandet Sor.Danchai (def. Nopdetlek Chuwattana)	2001	
(Thailand) Pirabkao Por.Priya (def. Samrandet Sor.Danchai)	November 26, 2001	
The title was vacant as of July 1, 2002.
(Thailand) Kwanpichit Hor Pattanachai (def. Dato V.P.P. Gym)	August 1, 2002	
(Thailand) Fasang Tor.Phitakchai (def. )	2000s	
(Thailand) Rungrat Naratrikul (def. )	2004	
The title was vacant as of November 1, 2005.
(Thailand) Linglom Tor.Chalermchai (def. Luknimit Singklongsi)	November 16, 2005	
Linglom vacated the title in 2006.
(Thailand) Luknimit Singklongsi (def. Fahsang Tor.Pitakchai)	December 26, 2006	
(Thailand) Rungrat Naratrikul (def. Anchai Kiatyongyut)	2007	
(Thailand) Palangpon Piriyanoppachai (def. )	2008	
(Thailand) Yodtongthai Por.Telakun (def. Palangpon Piriyanoppachai)	September 17, 2009	
Yodtongthai vacated the title in 2010.
(Thailand) Ngaoprajan Chuwattana (def. )	2010	
(Thailand) Trakunphet Thanasakkunsong (def. )	2011	
Trakunphet vacated the title in 2011.
(Thailand) Dang Sor.Ploenjit (def. Prakaithong Sitnoi)	June 2, 2011	
(Thailand) Dedkart Por.Pongsawang (def. Dang Sor.Ploenjit)	July 21, 2011	def. Prajanchai Por.Phetnamtong on August 18, 2011
(Thailand) Sangmanee Sor Tienpo (def. Dedkart Por.Pongsawang)	June 6, 2012	
Sangmanee vacated the title in 2012.
(Thailand) Panpayak Jitmuangnon (def. Ruengsak Sitniwat)	May 2, 2013	
Panpayak vacated the title in 2013.
(Thailand) Phetmuangchon Por.Suantong (def. Kumandoi Sor.Jitpakdee)	August 14, 2014	
(Thailand) Kwandom Phetsimean (def. Phetmuangchon Por.Suantong)	May 7, 2015	
Kwandom vacated the title in 2015.
(Thailand) Rungnarai Kiatmuu9 (def. Satanmuanglek Numpornthep)	May 9, 2016	
Rungnarai vacated the title in 2017.
(Thailand) Yoktong Pinsinchai (def. Chanalert Meenayothin)	March 12, 2018	
Yoktong vacated the title in 2018.
(Thailand) Chanalert Meenayothin (def. Praewprao PetchyindeeAcademy)	September 13, 2018	
Chanalert vacated the title in 2018.
(Thailand) Praewprao PetchyindeeAcademy (def. Phetanuwat Nor.Anuwatgym)	November 22, 2018	
(Thailand) Sangfah Nor.AnuwatGym (def. Praewprao PetchyindeeAcademy)	July 11, 2019	def. Chaiyo PetchyindeeAcademy on September 5, 2019
(Thailand) Praewprao PetchyindeeAcademy (2) (def. Sangfah Nor.Anuwatgym)	December 5, 2019	
Praewprao vacated the title in 2020.
(Thailand) Anantachai KittyMuaythai (def. Tahanaek Nayokatasala)	December 3, 2020	
Anantachai vacated the title in 2021.
(Thailand) Phetsiam Jor.Pattreya (def. Petchmawin Singmawynn)	February 7, 2022	
Phetsiam vacated the title in 2022.
(Thailand) Petchpanom Sor.Salacheep (def. Singdam YutSurat)	September 25, 2022	
(France) Petchneung PetchMuayThai (def. Petchpasak Sor.Salacheep)	July 30, 2023	drew with Domthong Lukjaoporongtom on November 25, 2023
(Thailand) Domthong Lukjaoporongtom (def. Petchneung PetchMuayThai)	February 3, 2024	def. Boonchai Sor.Boonmeerit on November 16, 2024
(Thailand) Laempo Sitkhunwasan (def. Domthong Lukjaoporongtom)	June 21, 2025	
(Thailand) Duan99 SorJor.TongPrachin (def. Laempo Sitkhunwasan)	August 23, 2025	def. Laempo Sitkhunwasan on January 31, 2026
(Thailand) Chalamchon Or.Thepsupha (def. Kradooklek Or.Atchariya for the interim title)	May 16, 2026	

=== Flyweight Championship ===
Weight limit: 112 lb (50.8 kg)

Name	Date	Defenses
(Thailand) Kwanyuen Sitsing (def. )	1960	
Inaugural champion.
(Thailand) Plainoi Ror.For.Tor (def. Payaknoi Sitthiamlee)	October 19, 1961	
Saenchai Therdthai and Khunphaen Muangthong fought to a draw for the vacant belt on January 8, 1963.
(Thailand) Payaknoi Sitthiamlee (def. )	1963	
(Thailand) Suchart Srisothon (def. Payaknoi Sitthiamlee)	March 21, 1963	def. Sankuansak Itthianuchit in 1963
The belt was vacant as of June 1, 1963.
(Thailand) Saenchai Therdthai (def. Khunpaen Muangthong)	June 6, 1963	
(Thailand) Suchart Srisothon (def. )	1964	
(Thailand) Pacchai Srijanphos (def. Suchart Srisothon)	May 21, 1964	def. Sinchainoi Laemfahpa on June 24, 1965
(Thailand) Jomkitti Singphaniang (def. )	1966–1967	def. Samingthong Jiraphan on July 26, 1967
(Thailand) Fahsai Twaeechai (def. Rittichai Lukkaowjao)	June 9, 1968	
(Thailand) Chainoi Sor.Siripan (def. Noknoi Singthanongsak)	1971	
Chainoi was stripped of the title after being knocked out by Samersing Tianhiran in a non-title fight in 1972.
(Thailand) Samersing Tianhiran (def. Chainoi Sor.Siripan)	1973	
Samersing vacated the title in 1973.
(Thailand) Naret KiatChor.Por. (def. Rueanpae Sitwatnang)	February 13, 1974	
(Thailand) Ruengsak Porntawee (def. Naret KiatChor.Por.)	April 20, 1974	
Ruengsak vacated the title in 1974.
(Thailand) Raklek Chutinawee (def. Kotchasarn Pongchalon)	November 30, 1974	
Raklek vacated the title in 1975.
(Thailand) Kengkaj Kiatkriangkrai (def. Numtanong Suanmiskwan)	July 15, 1976	
Kengkaj vacated the title in 1977.
(Thailand) Tawanook Sitpoonchai (def. Khaosod Sitpraprom)	May 2, 1977	def. Jomwo Sakniran on June 2, 1977
Tawanook vacated the title in 1977.
(Thailand) Phanmongkol Hor.Mahachai (def. Bangsai Kongkalai)	August 7, 1978	draws with Thong Petchyindee on April 5, 1979; def. Thong Petchyindee on December 24, 1979; def. Fakramram Lukphrabat on February 5, 1981
(Thailand) Phetnoi Manukiat (def. Phanmongkol Hor.Mahachai)	May 30, 1981	
(Thailand) Phanmongkol Hor.Mahachai (2) (def. Phetnoi Manukiat)	August 19, 1981	
Phanmongkol vacated the title in 1982.
(Thailand) Lankrung Kiatkriankgrai (def. Boonam Sor.Jarunee)	December 24, 1982	def. Chaowalit Sitpraprom on May 12, 1983; def. Chaowalit Sitpraprom on August 24, 1983
(Thailand) Sangyuth Thianhiran (def. Lankrung Kiatkriankgrai)	October 1, 1984	
(Thailand) Boonam Sor.Jarunee (def. Sangyuth Thianhiran)	November 21, 1984	def. Daoden Sor.Sukasem on March 6, 1985; def. Detduang Por.Pongsawang on June 24, 1985
Boonam vacated the title in 1985.
(Thailand) Sangyuth Thianhiran (2) (def. Detduang Por.Pongsawang)	September 16, 1985	
(Thailand) Nopachai Lukmingkwan (def. Sangyuth Thianhiran)	October 17, 1985	draws with Panomtuanlek Hapalang on February 13, 1986
(Thailand) Lukchang Sitchang (def. Nopachai Lukmingkwan)	August 11, 1986	
(Thailand) Waifai PraphatMotors (def. Lukchang Sitchang)	April 11, 1987	
(Thailand) Boonmee Sitchuchon (def. Waifai PraphatMotors)	June 15, 1987	
(Thailand) Samernoi Tor.Boonlert (def. Boonmee Sitchuchon)	February 18, 1988	
(Thailand) Veeraphol Sahaprom (def. Samernoi Tor.Boonlert)	March 24, 1988	
(Thailand) Dennuea Denmolee (def. Veeraphol Sahaprom)	January 15, 1989	
(Thailand) Kaensak Sor.Ploenjit (def. Dennuea Denmolee)	June 5, 1989	
Kaensak vacated the title in 1989.
(Thailand) Samernoi Tor.Boonlert (2) (def. Thanongdet Kiatphayathai)	May 10, 1990	def. Supernoi Sor.Khettalingchan on November 29, 1990; def. Singnoi Sor.Prasartporn on December 31, 1990
(Thailand) Banluedet Lukprabaht (def. Samernoi Tor.Boonlert)	January 30, 1991	
(Thailand) Singnoi Sor.Prasartporn (def. Banluedet Lukprabaht)	March 20, 1991	
Singnoi vacated the title in 1991.
(Thailand) Banluedet Lukprabaht (2) (def. Samernoi Tor.Boonlert)	April 24, 1991	
(Thailand) Samernoi Tor.Boonlert (3) (def. Banluedet Lukprabaht)	July 17, 1991	
Samernoi was stripped of the title after being disqualified for a knee to the groin during a defense against Banluedet on September 12, 1991.
(Thailand) Namtaothong Sor.Sirikul (def. Samernoi Tor.Boonlert)	December 23, 1991	
(Thailand) Thapisut Sor.Maliwan (def. Namtaothong Sor.Sirikul)	July 13, 1992	
Thapisut was stripped of the title after missing weight for his defense against Kukkong on December 12, 1992.
(Thailand) Kukkong Por.Surasak (def. Thapisut Sor.Maliwan)	December 12, 1992	
Kukkong vacated the title in 1993.
(Thailand) Kwanna Tor.Boonlert (def. Rolex Kaennorasing)	1993	
(Thailand) Chatchai Sor.Suwanpakdee (def.)	1993	
(Thailand) Rolex Kaennorasing (def. Chatchai Sor.Suwanpakdee)	November 28, 1994	def. Chatchai Sor.Suwanpakdee on June 5, 1995
(Thailand) Plathong Jockygym (def. )	1996	
(Thailand) Asawin Kiatmonthep (def. )	1996-1997	
Asawin vacated the title in 1997.
(Thailand) Lanna Por.Phisut (def. Boonchu Sor.Narongchai)	October 22, 1997	
(Thailand) Boonlert Pot.Thawatchai (def. Lanna Por.Phisut)	February 3, 1999	
Boonlert vacated the title in 1999.
(Thailand) Pornnimat Kaitchansing (def. )	2000	
Pornnimat vacated the title in 2000.
(Thailand) Chomputhong Kiatniwat (def. Thamindong Na Rachawat)	2000	
(Thailand) Orono Sor.Sakulpan (def. )		
(Thailand) Pongsing Kiatchansing (def. )	2001–2002	
(Thailand) Kwanphichit Hor.Pattanachai (def. )	2003	
(Thailand) Chatchainoi Sitbenjama (def. Kwanphichit Hor.Pattanachai)	October 26, 2003	
Chatchainoi vacated the title in 2003.
(Thailand) Kanid Sitkhrusem (def. )	2004	
(Thailand) Mapralong Sitpotarn (def. )	2005	
(Thailand) Denmoo9 Soonkelahuaytom (def. )	2008	
(Thailand) Ponkrit Numplatahoimook (def. )	2010	
(Thailand) Lamnamoon Sakchaichot (def. )	2011	
(Thailand) Prajanchai Por.Phetnamtong (def. Meethee Kiatpratoom)	May 17, 2012	
(Thailand) Sangmanee Sor Tienpo (def. Prajanchai Por.Phetnamtong)	November 9, 2012	
Sangmanee vacated the title in 2012.
(Thailand) Trakunphet Sor.Sommai (def. )	2013	
Trakunphet vacated the title in 2013.
(Thailand) Nichao Suwitgym (def. Petrat Wor Wiwatananon)	June 5, 2014	
Nichao vacated the title in 2014.
(Thailand) Konkhodai Wor.Wiwattananon (def. )	2015	
(Thailand) Dokmaidaeng J.S.P (def. Konkhodai Wor.Wiwattananon)	May 6, 2015	
(Thailand) Saoek KesaGym (def. Dokmaidaeng J.S.P)	May 12, 2016	
Saoek vacated the title in 2017.
(Thailand) Chatploy Sor.Punsawat (def. Chokdee Maxjandee)	June 3, 2017	
Chatploy vacated the title in 2018.
(Thailand) Phetsommai Sor.Sommai (def. Chokploengrit Por.Lakboon)	August 8, 2018	def. Den Sor.Phet-Udon on July 4, 2019
(Thailand) Phetsomjit Jitmuangnon (def. Phetsommai Sor.Sommai)	November 25, 2019	
Phetsomjit vacated the title in 2019.
(Thailand) Petchdet Wor.Sangprapai (def. Dinnuathong Muadpong191)	March 24, 2022	
(Thailand) Paeyim Sor.Boonmerit (def. Petchdet Wor.Sangprapai)	September 29, 2022	
Paeyim vacated the title in 2023.
(Thailand) WaeoWao Wor.Wangprom (def. KaenUbon Por.Lakboon)	May 18, 2023	
(Japan) Nadaka Yoshinari (def. WaeoWao Wor.Wangprom)	July 9, 2023	def. Rungwittaya Lukjaomaesaithong on August 12, 2023
(Thailand) KaenUbon Por.Lakboon (def.WaeoWao Wor.Wangprom for interim title.)	October 5, 2023	
Yoshinari vacated the title in December 2023 in order to move to super flyweight. KaenUbon was promoted to undisputed champion.
(Thailand) KaenUbon Por.Lakboon	—	def. Forwin Mor.Rattanabandit on February 1, 2024; def. Sakonpat ChotBangsaen on March 16, 2024
(Thailand) Jigsaw NayoksoywiangyongLamphun (def.KaenUbon Por.Lakboon)	August 15, 2024	def. Ryuya Okuwaki on February 15, 2025; def. WaeoWao Wor.Wangprom on May 17, 2025; def. Singdam Kiatfufueng on December 20, 2025; def. Duan99 SorJor.TongPrachin on June 27, 2026

=== Super Flyweight Championship ===
Weight limit: 115 lb (52.2 kg)

Name	Date	Defenses
(Thailand) Thong Petchyindee (def. Sarana Kiattisakkongka)	March 5, 1980	def. Maewpa Sitchang on May 15, 1980
Inaugural champion.
(Thailand) Petchmongkol Kiatsingnoi (def. Thong Petchyindee)	March 4, 1981	
Petchmongkol vacated the title upon winning it in 1981.
(Thailand) Samingnum Sithiboontam (def. Thong Petchyindee)	1981	
Samingnum vacated the title upon winning it in 1981.
(Thailand) Thong Petchyindee (2) (def. Samingnum Por.Thawachai)	June 4, 1981	
(Thailand) Phayanoi Sor Thasanee (def. Samernai Ketsongkram)	June 2, 1983	def. Nokweed Devy on November 27, 1983; def. Nopchai Lukmingkwan on September 20, 1984
(Thailand) Boonam Sor.Jarunee (def. Phayanoi Sor Thasanee)	August 1985	
(Thailand) Phisuj Sor.Jitpattana (def. Boonam Sor.Jarunee)	October 24, 1985	
(Thailand) Panomtuanlek Hapalang (def. Phisuj Sor.Jitpattana)	August 11, 1986	
Panomtuanlek vacated the title in 1986.
(Thailand) Boonam Sor.Jarunee (2) (def. Ruengchai Thairungruang)	October 29, 1986	def. Ruengchai Thairungruang on December 25, 1986
(Thailand) Lankrung Kiatkriangkrai (def. Boonam Sor.Jarunee)	January 29, 1987	
Lankrung vacated the title in 1987.
(Thailand) Wanpichit Kaennorasing (def. Phayakdam Yutthakit)	August 24, 1987	def. Boonmee Sitchuchon on October 12, 1987
Wanpichit vacated the title in 1987.
(Thailand) Kanongmek Chompoothong (def. Wanghin Por.Chaiwat)	March 24, 1988	def. Saichon Pichitsuk on November 24, 1988
Kanongmek vacated the title in 1989. Rajasak Sor.Vorapin and Ekaphon Chuwattana fought to a draw for the vacant belt on June 15, 1989.
(Thailand) Rajasak Sor.Vorapin (def. Ekaphon Chuwattana)	July 13, 1989	
Rajasak was stripped of the title in 1990.
(Thailand) Dennuea Denmolee (def. Kongfah Lukthapfah)	May 9, 1990	def. Daonapa Kiatsamran on January 30, 1991
(Thailand) Lakhin Wassantasit (def. Dennuea Denmolee)	December 19, 1991	def. Singnoi Sor.Prasatporn on January 23, 1992; def. Burklerk Pinsinchai on March 19, 1992
(Thailand) Saenmuangnoi Lukchaopormahesak (def. Lakhin Wassandasit)	September 28, 1992	
Samson vacated the title in 1993.
(Thailand) Veeraphol Sahaprom (def. Silapathai Jockygym)	June 23, 1993	def. Duangsompong Por.Pongsawang on February 17, 1994; def. Chartchainoi Chaorai-Oi on June 22, 1994
Veeraphol vacated the title in 1994.
(Thailand) Kasemlek Kiatsiri (def. Saencherng Sinwatcomputer)	December 22, 1994	
(Thailand) Pongpayak Thammakesem (def. Kasemlek Kiatsiri)	May 29, 1995	
(Thailand) Newsaencherng Pinsinchai (def. )	1996	def. Saenthanong Lukbanyai on March 4, 1996.; def. Srisatchanalai TaxiMeter on July 22, 1996.
Newsaencherng vacated the title in 1997.
(Thailand) Srisatchanalai TaxiMeter (def. Yodthanu Daopaetriew)	December 8, 1997	
Sisatchanalai vacated the title in 1998.
(Thailand) Lerdsila Chumpairtour (def. Peesadaeng Kor.Kumanont)	1999	def. Peesadaeng Kor.Kumanont on May 19, 1999; def. Saenchoenglek Jirakriangkrai on September 29, 1999
Lerdsila vacated the title in 1999.
(Thailand) Anuwat Kaewsamrit (def. )	1999	
Anuwat vacated the title upon winning it in 2000.
(Thailand) Thongchai Tor.Silachai (def. Sayannoi Kiatprapat)	May 31, 2001	def. Sayannoi Kiatprapat in 2001
(Thailand) Phongsing Kiatchansing (def. Thongchai Tor.Silachai)	February 26, 2003	def. Saenchainoi ToyotaRayong on October 16, 2003
(Thailand) Chatchainoi Sitbenjama (def. Phongsing Kiatchansing)	December 25, 2003	
The title was vacant as of January 2005.
(Thailand) Pornsanae Sitmonchai (def. Wannar Kaennorasing)	February 14, 2005	
Pornsanae vacated the title in 2005.
(Thailand) Tubnar Sitromsai (def. )	2005	
(Thailand) Detnarong Sitjaboon (def. )	2006	
(Thailand) Khaimookdam Sit-O (def. Daoden Singklongsi)	June 19, 2008	
(Thailand) Pakorn Sakyothin (def. Khaimookdam Sit-O)	July 10, 2008	
Pakorn vacated the title in 2009.
(Thailand) Pudpadnoi Muangsima (def. )	2009	
(Thailand) Yodtongthai Por.Telakun (def. Yodmongkol Muangsima)	September 23, 2010	
(Thailand) Superbank Sakchaichot (def. Yodtongthai Por.Telakun)	August 18, 2011	
Superbank vacated the title in 2011.
(Thailand) Fahsawang Tor.Sangtiennoi (def. )	2011	
Fahsawang vacated the title in 2012.
(Thailand) Sangmanee Sor Tienpo (def. Inseekao Rachanon)	February 21, 2013	
Sangmanee vacated the title in 2013.
(Thailand) Chaisri Sakniranrat (def. Trakunphet Sor.Sommai)	June 2014	
Chaisiri vacated the title in 2014.
(Thailand) Sprinter Pangkongprab (def. Kengkla Por.Pekko)	January 15, 2015	
Sprinter vacated the title in 2015.
(Thailand) Jomhod Eminentair (def. Chaisiri Saknirunrath)	August 6, 2015	
Jomhod vacated the title in 2015.
(Thailand) Puenkon Tor.Surat (def. Prajanban Sor.Jor.Wichitmuangpadrew)	June 9, 2016	def. Gingsanglek Tor.Laksong on December 21, 2016
Puenkon vacated the title in 2017.
(Thailand) Phetsuphan Por.Daorungruang (def. Nong Rose Barnjaroensuk)	November 2, 2017	def. Fahmongkhol Taembangsai on January 24, 2018; def. Kumandoi Petcharoenwit on March 5, 2018; def. Kongmuangtrang Kaewsamrit on September 20, 2018; def. Wanmawin Pumpanmuang on February 11, 2019; def. Phetsomjit Jitmuangnon on December 19, 2019
(Thailand) Kongchai Chanaidonmuang (def. Phetsuphan Por.Daorungruang)	January 30, 2020	
Kongchai vacated the title in 2020.
(Thailand) Fahbunmee BirdRangsit (def. Saifahnoi MuadvitisChiangMai)	November 4, 2020	
Fahbunmee vacated the title when he retired in 2021.
(Thailand) Kumandoi Petchyindee Academy (def. Phetsila Wor.Uracha)	March 10, 2022	
Kumandoi vacated the title in 2022.
(Thailand) Petchdet Wor.Sangprapai (def. Phetnanuwat Nor.AnuwatGym)	January 5, 2023	
Petchdet vacated the title in 2023.
(Thailand) Praewprao PetchPrawFah (def. Petchrung Sitkrunote)	June 8, 2023	def. Dinnuathong Muadphong191 on October 14, 2023
(Japan) Nadaka Yoshinari (def. Chusap Sor.Salacheep for interim title.)	December 23, 2023	
(Japan) Nadaka Yoshinari (def. Praewprao PetchPrawFah)	February 12, 2024	def. Jomhod Kor.Suwantat on July 14, 2024; def. Petchnueng Petchmuaythai on December 1, 2024
Yoshinari vacated the title in 2025.
(Thailand) Pangtor Por.Lakboon (def. Jomhod Sitluangpeenamfon)	August 16, 2025	
(Thailand) Petchdet Wor.Sangprapai (def. Pangtor Por.Lakboon)	November 22, 2025	def. Fourwin Sitjaroensap on January 17, 2026; def. Phettechin BangsaenFightClub on August 1, 2026; draws with Jigsaw SitThailand on October 10, 2026
(Thailand) Phettechin BangsaenFightClub (def. Phusingha Or.Khamin for the interim title)	April 4, 2026	

=== Bantamweight Championship ===
Weight limit: 118 lb (53.5 kg)

Name	Date	Defenses
(Thailand) LukSor Luknawikyothin (def. )	1961	
(Thailand) Yongyut Lukchaonuea (def. LukSor.Luknawikyothin)	October 19, 1961	
(Thailand) Anantasak Thianchai (def. Pairoj Payaksophon)	1960s	def. Payaknoi Klongpachon
Anantasak vacated the title to challenge for the Featherweight title in 1965
(Thailand) Adulsak Itthianuchit (def. )	1966	
(Thailand) Denthoranee Muangsurin (def. Adulsak Itthianuchit)	July 26, 1967	
(Thailand) Chalermsak Ploenjit (def. )	1969	
(Thailand) Theppabut Laemfahpa (def. Chalermsak Ploenjit)	1970	
(Thailand) Apisak Muangsurin (def. Theppabut Laemfahpa)	July 16, 1971	
(Thailand) Klairung Lukjaomaesaitong (def. Chandech Weerapon)	1973	
(Thailand) Samersing Tianhiran (def. Klairung Lukjaomaesaitong)	January 14, 1974	
Samersing vacated the title in 1974.
(Thailand) Jocky Sitkanpai (def. Ruanpae Sitwatnang)	February 8, 1975	
Jocky vacated the title on 1975.
(Thailand) Saksakon Sakchannarong (def. Paruhat Longnoen)	1975	
(Thailand) Sagat Porntawee (def. Saksakon Sakchannarong)	March 26, 1976	
Sagat vacated the title on 1976.
(Thailand) Raklek Chutinawee (def. Phichit Sor. Kiatsak)	August 5, 1976	
(Thailand) Nanfah Siharatdecho (def. Raklek Chutinawee)	February 24, 1977	def. Tawanook Sitpoonchai on September 22, 1977
Nanfah vacated the title in 1977.
(Thailand) Singnum Ekkachai (def. )	1977	
(Thailand) Kengkaj Kiatkriangkrai (def. Singnum Ekkachai)	January 18, 1978	
Kengkaj vacated the title on 1978.
(Thailand) Kingthong Sakornpitak (def. Jomwo Sakniran)	December 6, 1978	
Kinghtong was stripped of the title in 1979 after he admitted to taking a dive against Fanta Phornpitsanu in a non-title fight.
(Thailand) Mafuang Weerapol (def. Wanlop Pichitsamut)	March 5, 1980	def. Jomwo Sakniran on June 5, 1980
(Thailand) Jomwo Sakniran (def. Mafuang Weerapol)	April 8, 1981	def. Paruhat Loh-ngoen on November 23, 1981
Jomwo was stripped of the title in 1983.
(Thailand) Nikhom Phetphothong (def. Ruengnarong Thairungruang)	October 13, 1983	
(Thailand) Manasak Sor.Ploenjit (def. Nikhom Phetphothong)	December 28, 1983	
Manasak was stripped of his title after losing by knockout in a non-title fight on June 29, 1984.
(Thailand) Nikhom Phetphothong (2) (def. Manasak Sor.Ploenjit)	November 21, 1984	
(Thailand) Saencherng Pinsinchai (def. Nikhom Phetphothong)	December 26, 1984	
Saencherng vacated the title in 1985.
(Thailand) Jampatong Na Nontachai (def. Sangtiennoi Sitsurapong)	August 5, 1985	def. Lankrung Kiatkriankgrai on December 12, 1985; def. Boonam Sor.Jarunee on September 5, 1985
(Thailand) Panomtuanlek Hapalang (def. Jampatong Na Nontachai)	September 25, 1986	
Panomtuanlek vacated the title in 1986.
(Thailand) Ruengchai Thairungruang (def. Raerung Thamachat)	September 23, 1987	
(Thailand) Boonam Sor.Jarunee (def. Ruengchai Thairungruang)	November 26, 1987	def. Chanalert Muanghatyai on February 18, 1988
(Thailand) Wanpichit Kaennorasing (def. Boonam Sor.Jarunee)	March 24, 1988	
(Thailand) Klaisuwit Soonkelanongkhee (def. Wanpichit Kaennorasing)	September 26, 1988	
(Thailand) Boonam Chor.Waikul (2) (def. Klaisuwit Soonkelanongkhee)	February 13, 1989	def. Klaisuwit Soonkelanongkhee on March 20, 1989
(Thailand) Chanalert Muanghatyai (def. Boonam Chor.Waikul)	April 27, 1989	def. Boonam Chor.Waikul on February 22, 1990; def. Rajasak Sor.Vorapin on April 25, 1990
(Thailand) Wanghin Por.Chaiwat (def. Boonam Chor.Waikul)	January 10, 1991	
(Thailand) Yodkhuntap SitKrupat (def. Wanghin Por.Chaiwat)	March 20, 1991	
Yodkhuntap vacated the title in 1991.
(Thailand) Detsuek Kiatsamran (def. Taweechai Vor.Preecha)	May 3, 1991	
(Thailand) Yodkhuntap SitKrupat (2) (def. Chingchai Kongudom)	March 20, 1991	
(Thailand) Klaisuwit Soonkelanongkhee (2) (def. Yodkhuntap SitKrupat)	1992	
(Thailand) Yodkhunpon Sittraiphum (def. Klaisuwit Soonkelanongkhee)	September 7, 1992	def. Namtaothong Sor.Sirikul on May 26, 1993
(Thailand) Jaroensak Kiatnakornchon (def. Yodkhunpon Sittraiphum)	September 16, 1993	
(Thailand) Rotnarong Daopadriew (def. Sukhothai Taximeter)	August 11, 1994	def. Burklerk Pinsinchai on November 30, 1994
(Thailand) Sukhothai Taximeter (def. Rotnarong Daopadriew)	May 29, 1995	
Thailand Pinsinchai (def. Sukhothai Taximeter)	June 21, 1995	
Sukhothai Taximeter (2) (def. Thailand Pinsinchai)	1995	
(Thailand) Bounlek Sitkuanim (def. )	1990s	
(Thailand) Newsaencherng Pinsinchai (def. )	1997-1998	
(Thailand) Thong B.M.Video (def. Lanna Por.Phisut)	March 25, 1998	
(Thailand) Sila Tor.Bangsaen (def. Thong B.M.Video)	January 20, 1999	
(Thailand) Chanrit Sit-O (def. )	1999	
(Thailand) Norasing Kiatprasanchai (def. )	2000	
(Thailand) Lerdsila Chumpairtour (def. Norasing Kiatprasanchai)	2002	def. Sakniran Sakthewan on August 18, 2002
(Thailand) Chaomailek Sor.Tantawan (def. )	2003	
(Thailand) Deatsak Sor.Thumpetch (def. Chaomailek Sor.Tantawan)	2004	
(Thailand) Jomthong Chuwattana (def. Deatsak Sor.Thumpetch)	September 3, 2004	
Jomthong vacated the title in 2005.
(Thailand) Kayasit Chuwattana (def. )	September 3, 2005	
(Thailand) Dendanai P.K.Stereo (def. )	2006	
(Thailand) Samrandet Sor.Danchai (def. )	2007	
(Thailand) Tubnar Sitromsai (def. )	2008	
(Thailand) Kompichit Sor.Kor.Siripong (def. )	2009	def. Toto SittichaiGym on June 30, 2011
Kompichit vacated the title in 2012.
(Thailand) Singdam Wor.Rungniran (def. Sakmongkon 96Peenang)	April 5, 2012	
Singdam vacated the title in 2012.
(Thailand) Manasak Pinsinchai (def. Phetseenin Phayaksuphan)	October 18, 2012	def. Mutsuki Ebata on March 10, 2013
Manasak vacated the title in 2013.
(Thailand) Fonphet Chuwattana (def. Mutsuki Ebata)	September 16, 2013	def. Mutsuki Ebata on March 15, 2015
(Thailand) Phetwason Or.Daokrajai (def. Fonphet Chuwattana)	November 18, 2015	
Phetwason vacated the title in 2016.
(Thailand) Phetbankek Sor.Sommai (def. Chalongrat Sor.Ratchabut)	November 17, 2016	
(Thailand) Chalawan AttachaiMuaythai (def. Phetbankek Sor.Sommai)	November 13, 2017	def. Weerachai Teded99 on May 14, 2018.
Chalawan vacated the title in 2018.
(Thailand) Saotho SitChefboontham (def. Kongsak Sor.Satra)	January 23, 2019	drew with Mutsuki Ebata on October 20, 2019
Saotho vacated the title in 2020.
(Thailand) Phetmongkol Soonkelahuaytom (def. Patakthep VK KhaoYai)	February 27, 2022	
(Thailand) Wanwin Lukjaoparongtom (def. Phetmongkol Soonkelahuaytom)	September 25, 2022	
Wanwin vacated the title in 2023.
(Thailand) Pangtor Por.Lakboon (def. JJ Or.Pimonsri)	May 18, 2023	
Pangtor was stripped of the title when he lost via decision against Khunsueklek Boomdeksian in a non-title fight on August 9, 2023..
(Thailand) Kumandoi PetchyindeeAcademy (def. Pangtor Por.Lakboon)	January 20, 2024	
(Thailand) Khunsueklek Boomdeksian (def. Kumandoi PetchyindeeAcademy)	April 6, 2024	def. Phetsiam Jor.Pattreya on May 11, 2024
(Japan) Ryuki Matsuda (def. Khunsueklek Boomdeksian)	July 14, 2024	
(Thailand) Khunsueklek Boomdeksian (2) (def. Ryuki Matsuda)	September 21, 2024	def. Kevin Martinez on November 16, 2024; def. Wanchainoi Sitsarawatseur on December 21, 2024; def. Nuapayak Wor.Sangprapai on May 24, 2025
Khunsueklek vacated the title on July 11, 2025.
(Thailand) Jaroensuk BoonlannaMuaythai (def. Chalamdam Nayokathasala)	August 30, 2025	def. Kazuki Osaki on December 27, 2025; def. Captainteam Adsanpatong on February 28, 2026; def. Puenyai Por.Lakboon on May 9, 2026
(Thailand) CaptainTeam Adsanpatong (def. Peyman Zolfaghari for the interim title)	December 13, 2025	
(Thailand) Pangtor Por.Lakboon (def. Saotho Or.Atchariya for the interim title)	July 4, 2026	
(Thailand) Pangtor Por.Lakboon (def. Jaroensuk BoonlannaMuaythai)	August 29, 2026	

=== Super Bantamweight Championship ===
Weight limit: 122 lb (55.3 kg)

Name	Date	Defenses
(Thailand) Anantadej Sithiran (Anantakorn Sor.Lukmuangraj) (def. )	1960s	
Inaugural champion.
(Thailand) Sanaengam Sor.Paedsing (def. Norasing Issaraphan)		
(Thailand) Rittisak Sor.For.Yor. (def. Sanaengam Sor.Paedsing)		
(Thailand) Phonnimit Laemfapha (def. )	1965	
(Thailand) Pathum Srisothon (def. Ponnimit Laemfahpa)	August 12, 1965	def. Toiting Kiatwayupak on November 25, 1965.
(Thailand) Norasing Issaraphan (def. Rittisak Sor.For.Yor.)	1968	
(Thailand) Fahsai Taweechai (def. Norasing Issaraphan)	November 10, 1968	
(Thailand) Saifah Saengmorakot (def. Fahsai Taweechai)	May 29, 1970	
(Thailand) Wannarong Peeramit (def. )	1973	
The title was vacant as of February 1, 1979.
(Thailand) Ruanpae Sitwatnang (def. Saknarongnoi Lukbangpakong)	August 30, 1976	
(Thailand) Saiphet Sakornpitak (def. Manachai Sit Amphon)	February 5, 1979	
(Thailand) Singhapathom Pongsurakan (def. Dennarong Saksaendee)	1980	
(Thailand) Jock Kiatniwat (def. Singhapathom Pongsurakan)	1980	
The title was vacant as of March 1, 1982.
(Thailand) Khunponnoi Sitprasang (def. Saphaphet Kiatphetnoi)	March 15, 1982	def. Saphaphet Kiatphetnoi on September 16, 1982.; def. Ronachai Sunkilanongkhee on January 27, 1983.; def. Kengkajnoi Kiatniwat on June 22, 1983.; def. Pol Sitpordaeng on September 26, 1983.
(Thailand) Nokweed Davy (def. Phanmongkol Hor.Mahachai)	June 16, 1984	
Nokweed vacated the title in 1984.
(Thailand) Saphaphet Kiatphetnoi (def. Narak Sitkuanyim)	January 9, 1985	
(Thailand) Manasak Sor.Ploenchit (def. Saphaphet Kiatphetnoi)	May 31, 1987	
Manasak vacated the title in 1987.
(Thailand) Daengnoi Lukprabat (def. )	1987–1988	
(Thailand) Kongnapa Watcharawit (def. Daengnoi Lukprabat)	March 24, 1988	
Kongnapa vacated the title in 1988.
(Thailand) Chamuekpet Hapalang (def. Wanpichit Kaennorasing)	February 22, 1989	
Chamuekpet vacated the title in 1989
(Thailand) Taweechai Wor.Preecha (def. Chokdee Kiatpayathai)	March 5, 1990	
(Thailand) Padejseuk Kiatsamran (def. Taweechai Wor.Preecha)	May 3, 1990	
(Thailand) Rajasak Sor.Vorapin (def. Padejseuk Kiatsamran)	July 9, 1990	def. Nuengsiam Kiatwichian on November 11, 1990.
(Thailand) Phatphon Detrittha (def. Rajasak Sor.Vorapin)	May 15, 1991	
(Thailand) Nuengsiam Kiatwichan (def. Phatphon Detrittha)	September 18, 1991	
(Thailand) Kanongmek Sitsai (def. Nuengsiam Kiatwichan)	April 8, 1992	
(Thailand) Nuengsiam Kiatwichan (2) (def. Kanongmek Sitsai)	1992	def. Kukrit Sor.Nayaiam on September 7, 1992.; def. Mawin Lukratchawit on December 23, 1992.; def. Thahanek Pichitman on August 23, 1993.
(Thailand) Paidaeng Lesakgym (def. Nuengsiam Kiatwichan)	1993	
(Thailand) Chamuekpet Hapalang (def. Paidaeng Lesakgym)	March 30, 1994	
(Thailand) Silapathai Jockygym (def. Chamuekpet Hapalang)	April 27, 1994	def. Komkiat Sor.Thanikul on May 17, 1995.
(Thailand) Chutin Por.Tawachai (def. Silapathai Jockygym)	January 24, 1996	def. Asawin Kiatmonthep on November 12, 1997.
(Thailand) Asawin Kiatmonthep (def. Chutin Por.Tawachai)	December 1997	
Asawin vacated the title in 1998.
(Thailand) Narat Sitkuanyim (def. )	1990s	
(Thailand) PhetEk Sor.Suwanpakdee (def. )	1999	
(Thailand) Pokaew Fonjangchonburi (def. Densiam Lukprabat)	February 12, 2004	
Pokaew vacated the title in 2004.
Lerdsila Chumpairtour (def. Thailand Pinsinchai)	June 17, 2004	
Lerdsila vacated the title in 2008.
(Thailand) Samrandet Sor.Srisompong (def. )	2008	
(Thailand) Thong Lukmakhamwan (def. )	2008	
(Thailand) Detpanom Chuwattana (def. )	2009	
Detpanom vacated the title in 2010.
(Thailand) Sirimongkol P.K.Stereo (def. )	2010	
Sirimongkol vacated the title in 2011.
(Thailand) Khaimookdam Chuwattana (def. Methawin Kiatyongyut)	January 25, 2012	def. Kunitaka Fujiwara on February 17, 2013.
Khaimookdam vacated the title in 2013.
(Thailand) Surachai Srisuriyanyothin (def. Panpayak Sitjajik)	August 22, 2013	def. Rui Ebata on September 16, 2013.
Surachai vacated the title in 2015.
(Thailand) Weerachai Wor.Wiwatananon (def. )	2015	
(Thailand) Phetnamngam Aor.Kwanmuang (def. Werachai Wor.Wiwatananon)	September 10, 2015	
(Thailand) Kaotam Lukprabat (def. Phetnamngam Aor.Kwanmuang)	March 10, 2016	def. Matee Sor.Jor Vichitpidrew on December 22, 2016.; def. Nungpichit Keatchuchai on May 15, 2017.
Kaotam vacated the title in 2017.
(Thailand) Kongthoranee Sor.Sommai (def. Yodkhunsuk Mor.ChombuengRajabhat)	June 28, 2018	def. Padetsuk Kor.Kampanat on March 14, 2019.
Kongthoranee vacated the title in 2019.
(Thailand) Saoek Sitchefboontham (def. Thepthaksin Sor.Sornsing)	February 13, 2020	
Saoek vacated the title in 2021.
(Thailand) Phetsansaeb SorJor.Tongprachin (def. Yod Parunchai)	February 7, 2022	
Phetsansaeb vacated the title in 2022.
(Thailand) Chalamdam NayokAthasala (def. Singdam Kafaefocus)	May 28, 2023	
Chalamdam vacated the title in 2023.
(Thailand) Phetsiam Jor.Patreeya (def. Wuttikorn Suannamtankiri)	February 17, 2024	
Phetsiam was stripped of the title when he lost via knockout to Khunsueklek Boomdeksian on May 11, 2024.
(Thailand) Petchsamarn Sor.Samarngarment (def. Parnthep V.K.Khaoyai)	May 18, 2024	def. Petchpailin SorJor.Tongprachin on June 15, 2024.; def. Rittidet Lookjaoporrongtom on December 7, 2024.; def. Petchsila Wor.Auracha on January 25, 2025.; def. Yodkatanyu Jitmuangnon on April 26, 2025.; def. Khunsueknoi Boomdeksian on June 7, 2025.
(Thailand) Petchsila Wor.Auracha (def. Petchsamarn Sor.Samarngarment)	September 13, 2025	
(Thailand) Khunsueknoi Boomdeksian (def. Maytee Sor.Toi.Paetriew for the interim title)	November 9, 2025	
(Thailand) Khunsueknoi Boomdeksian (def. Petchsila Wor.Auracha)	December 27, 2025	
Khunsueknoi vacated the title in 2026.
(Thailand) Petchsila Wor.Auracha (def. Petchsamarn Sor.Samarngarment)	April 18, 2026	def. Koki Osaki on October 10, 2026.
(Japan) Koki Osaki (def. Chaitone Wor.Auracha for the interim title)	June 27, 2026	
Petchsila vacated the title in November 2026 in order to move up in weight..

=== Featherweight Championship ===
Weight limit: 126 lb (57.2 kg)

Name	Date	Defenses
(Thailand) Suwang Chaimiboon (def. Wihokthiam Kamhaeng)	January 28, 1951	
Inaugural champion.
(Thailand) Chusak Rajawat (def. Suwang Chaimiboon)	July 3, 1955	
Chusak was stripped of the title in 1955 after being dismissed in a non-title fight.
(China) Saiphet Yontharakit (def. Chula Lukthaksin)	October 3, 1955	def. Pathomchai Chomsrimek; def. Kimhang Sitphon; drew Sorasak Barbos; def. Sorasak Barbos; def. Isarak Barbos in 1956.
Saipetch was the first foreign fighter to win a major title. He vacated in 1957 due to lack of competition and started competing in boxing.
(Thailand) Isarak Barbos (def. Chaiyong Rajawat)	1950s	
(Thailand) Wicharn Sor.Pinjisak (def. Weerachai Lukchaonuea)	1958	
Wicharn vacated the title to move up in weight.
(Thailand) Namsak Yontharakit (def. Pongsak Lukthaksin)	1959–1960	
(Thailand) Dejrit Yontharakit (def. Rerngsak Sor.Lukpitak)	1961	
Dejrit vacated the title to move up in weight.
(Thailand) Den Srisothon (def. Saentanong Kesongkram)	June 27, 1963	
(Thailand) Pairoj Payaksophon (def. Den Srisothorn)	July 9, 1964	
(Thailand) Anantasak Ror.For.Tor. (Thianchai) (def. Suwitnoi Lukbangplasoi)	September 30, 1965	def. Praedam Muangsurin; def. Chingchai Sararam
Anantasak was stripped of the title after losing by knock out against Saenchai Therdthai in a non-title fight.
(Thailand) Anantasak Ror.For.Tor. (Thianchai) (2) (def. Saenchai Therdthai)	1966	
(Thailand) Mongkoldet Pitakchai (def. Anantasak Ror.For.Tor.)	1966	
(Thailand) Weerachai Hor.Mahachai (def. Mongkoldet Pitakchai)	1967	
(Thailand) Ponsawan Laemfahpa (def. Weerachai Hor.Mahachai)	July 29, 1968	
(Thailand) Singhao Sor.Lukpitak (def. Rungnapa Ritanuman)	1969	
Singhao was stripped of the title after being stopped by Wichannoi Porntawee in a non-title fight on April 6, 1970.
(Thailand) Detsakda Sorraram (def. Saenrit Jennarong)	August 29, 1971	
Detsakda vacated the title in 1975.
(Thailand) Narongnoi Kiatbandit (def. Ruengsak Porntawee)	June 30, 1975	
(Thailand) Nongkhai Sor.Prapatsorn (def. Narongnoi Kiatbandit)	July 15, 1976	def. Samersing Tianhirun on June 23, 1977.; def. Tawanook Sitpoonchai on May 17, 1978.; def. Seksan Sor.Thepittak on June 21, 1978.; def. Seksan Sor.Thepittak on March 15, 1979.
Nongkhai vacated the title in 1980.
The title was vacant before Fanta and Singpathom's fight.
(Thailand) Fanta Phetmuangtrat (def. Singpathom Pongsurakarn)	March 11, 1981	
(Thailand) Singpathom Pongsurakarn (def. Fanta Phetmuangtrat)	November 5, 1981	def. Lom-Isan Sor.Thanikul on July 14, 1982.
(Thailand) Kitti Sor.Thanikul (def. Singhapathom Pongsurakan)	January 31, 1983	
Kitti vacated the title in 1983.
(Thailand) Lom-Isan Sor.Thanikul (def. Wanpadet Pukrongfah)	September 28, 1983	draws with Kengkajnoi Kiatniwat on December 12, 1983.; def. Kengkajnoi Kiatniwat on January 18, 1984.; def. Nokweed Devy on October 8, 1984.
(Thailand) Nokweed Devy (def. Lom-Isan Sor.Thanikul)	February 2, 1985	def. Lom-Isan Sor.Thanikul on May 30, 1985.
(Thailand) Lom-Isan Sor.Thanikul (2) (def. Nokweed Devy)	June 24, 1985	
(Thailand) Kengkajnoi Kiatniwat (def. Lom-Isan Sor.Thanikul)	December 23, 1985	def. Jongrak Lukprabaht on July 24, 1986.
(Thailand) Jongrak Lukprabaht (def. Kengkajnoi Kiatniwat)	September 25, 1986	draws with Saphaphet Kiatphetnoi on February 2, 1987.; def. Chokdee Kiatpayathai on April 29, 1987.; def. Ruengnoi Chomphuthong on December 23, 1987.
(Thailand) Poolsawat Sitsornthong (def. Jongrak Lukprabaht)	March 24, 1988	
(Thailand) Kongnapa Watcharawit (def. Panomtuanlek Hapalang)	January 15, 1989	def. Jomwo Chernyim on March 20, 1989.
(Thailand) Jack Kiatniwat (def. Kongnapa Watcharawit)	November 13, 1989	def. Chamuekpet Hapalang on January 29, 1990.
(Thailand) Chamuekpet Hapalang (def. Jack Kiatniwat)	March 29, 1990	def. Jack Kiatniwat on October 31, 1990.
(Thailand) Rajasak Sor.Vorapin (def. Chamuekpet Hapalang)	July 20, 1991	
(Thailand) Taweechai Wor.Preecha (def. Rajasak Sor.Vorapin)	August 1991	
(Thailand) Robert Kaennorasing (def. Taweechai Wor.Preecha)	November 25, 1991	def. Padejseuk Kiatsamran on January 29, 1992.; def. Rajasak Sor.Vorapin on March 25, 1992.; def. Jack Kiatniwat in 1992.; def. Buakaw Por.Pisichet on November 16, 1992.
Robert vacated the title in 1993.
(Thailand) Noppadet Sor.Rewadee (def. Wanwiset Kaennorasing)	August 18, 1993	
(Thailand) Wanwiset Kaennorasing (def. Noppadet Sor.Rewadee)	January 12, 1994	def. Noppadet Sor.Rewadee on May 5, 1994.
(Thailand) Chaidet Kiatchansing (def. Wanwiset Kaennorasing)	June 27, 1994	
(Thailand) Chamuekpet Hapalang (2) (def. Chaidet Kiatchansing)	July 27, 1994	
(Thailand) Samingnoi Sor.Thanikul (def. Chamuekpet Hapalang)	December 21, 1994	
(Thailand) Banluedet Lukprabaht (def. Samingnoi Sor.Thanikul)	February 22, 1995	
(Thailand) Phatphon Detrittha (def. Banluedet Lukprabaht)	May 24, 1995	
(Thailand) Prabsuek Sittisanthat (def. Phatphon Detrittha)	June 28, 1995	def. Yuthahat Sor.Narongchai on July 31, 1996.
Prabsuek was stripped of the title in 1997 after failing to defend it within the required period.
(Thailand) Rakhangkaeo Sakmueangklaeng (def. Ritthichai Lookchaomaesaitong)	1997	
(Thailand) Singbangkaeo Sitsuthapim (def. Rakhangkaeo Sakmueangklaeng)	February 19, 1998	
Singbangkaeo vacated the title in 1998.
(Thailand) Sornkhom Kiatnukul (def. Apichat Pluemkamon)	1999	
(Thailand) Muangfahlek Kiatwichian (def. Sornkhom Kiatnukul)	1999	
(Thailand) Noppakao Sor.Wanchat (def. Muangfahlek Kiatwichian)	2000	def. Chutin Por.Tawachai on November 9, 2000.
(Thailand) Watcharachai Kaewsamrit (def. Noppakao Sor.Wanchat)	January 17, 2001	
(Thailand) Noppakao Sor.Wanchat (2) (def. Watcharachai Kaewsamrit)	July 18, 2001	
(Thailand) Muangfahlek Kiatwichian (2) (def. Noppakao Sor.Wanchat)	August 5, 2002	
(Thailand) Anuwat Kaewsamrit (def. Muangfahlek Kiatwichian)	February 5, 2003	def. Muangfahlek Kiatwichian on August 6, 2003.; def. Nopparat Keatkhamtorn on May 6, 2005.
Anuwat was stripped of the title when he lost by knockout in a non-title bout to Nongbee Kiatyongyut on April 6, 2006.
Anuwat Kaewsamrit and Singtongnoi Por.Telakun fought to a draw for the vacant belt on September 4, 2006.
(Thailand) Jomthong Chuwattana (def. Anuwat Kaewsamrit)	November 16, 2006	
Jomthong vacated the title in 2007.
(Thailand) Sagetdao Phetpayathai (def. )	2008	def. Anuwat Kaewsamrit on April 30, 2009.
Sagetdao vacated the title in 2009.
(Thailand) Jomthong Chuwattana (2) (def. Sittisak Phetpayathai)	October 1, 2009	
Jomthong vacated the title in 2010.
(Thailand) Kaimukkao Chuwattana (def. Kongsiam Tor.Pitakchai)	August 9, 2010	
(Thailand) Kongsiam Tor.Pitakchai (def. Kaimukkao Chuwattana)	January 31, 2011	
Kongsiam vacated the title in 2011.
(Thailand) Ekkarit Mor.Krungthepthonburi (def. Kaimukkao Chuwattana)	June 30, 2011	
(Thailand) Srimongkol P.K.MuaythaiGym (def. Naka Kaewsamrit)	January 25, 2012	
(Thailand) Jompichit Sitchefboontham (def. Srimongkol PK.Muaythaigym)	July 4, 2013	
(Thailand) Songkom Nayoksanya (def. Jompichit Sitchefboontham)	March 27, 2014	def. Kotchasan Wor.Wiwattananon on August 13, 2014.
(Thailand) Jompichit Sitchefboontham (2) (def. Songkom Nayoksanya)	March 30, 2015	
(Thailand) Pettaksin Sor.Sommai (def. Jompichit Sitchefboontham)	September 8, 2016	def. Jompichit Sitchefboontham on December 21, 2017
Pettaksin vacated the title in 2018.
(Thailand) Yodkritsada Yutchonburi (def. Chankrit Or.Pimonsri)	November 7, 2018	
(Thailand) Phetpangan Mor.Ratanabandit (def. Yodkitsada Yuthachonburi)	August 1, 2019	
Phetpangan vacated the title in 2020.
(Thailand) Petchrungruang Or Tukdaeng (def. Messi Pangkongprab)	March 6, 2022	
Petchrungruang vacated the title in 2022.
(Thailand) Chaila Por.Lakboon (def. Narak SorJor.TongPrachin)	April 5, 2023	def. View Petchkoson on February 10, 2024
(Thailand) Yothin FA Group (def. Chaila Por.Lakboon)	April 27, 2024	def. Chaila Por.Lakboon on May 10, 2025
(Thailand) Chiebkhad Por.Pongsawang (def. Ronachai Tor.Ramintra for the interim title)	December 6, 2025	
(Thailand) Chiebkhad Por.Pongsawang (def. Yothin FA Group)	March 28, 2026	
(Thailand) Narak BanglongAutoMax (def. Chiebkhad Por.Pongsawang)	July 18, 2026	
(Thailand) Mungkornlek Sor.Thanapon (def. Noelisson Silva for the interim title)	September 12, 2026	def. Narak BanglongAutoMax on October 24, 2026

=== Super Featherweight Championship ===
Weight limit: 130 lb (59.0 kg)

Name	Date	Defenses
(Thailand) Den Srisothon (def. Jompop Lukbonammunfang)	August 13, 1964	
Inaugural champion.
(Thailand) Saennapha Payaksophon (def. Den Srisothon)	February 25, 1965	
(Thailand) Den Srisothon (2) (def. Saennapa Payaksophon)	1965	def. Kittichai Lukbonamanfang on May 12, 1966; def. Suwitnoi Lukbangplasoi on June 30, 1966
(Thailand) Fahphet SingUbon (def. Den Srisothon)	June 12, 1967	
(Thailand) Sakchai Luadsuphan (def. Fahphet SingUbon)	July 26, 1967	
(Thailand) Den Srisothon (3) (def. Sakchai Luadsuphan)	October 1, 1967	
The title was vacant as of 1973.
(Thailand) Wichannoi Porntawee (def. Saifah Saengmorakot)	January 21, 1974	def. Narongnoi Kiatbandit on February 2, 1976; def. Posai Sitiboonlert on July 15, 1976; def. Narongnoi Kiatbandit on December 15, 1976; def. Nongkhai Sor.Prapatsorn on April 28, 1977; def. Narongnoi Kiatbandit on December 8, 1977
(Thailand) Narongnoi Kiatbandit (def. Wichannoi Porntawee)	June 2, 1978	def. Nongkhai Sor.Prapatsorn on May 9, 1979; def. Khaosod Sitpraprom on August 15, 1979; def. Prawit Sritham on September 27, 1979
(Thailand) Nongkhai Sor.Prapatsorn (def. Narongnoi Kiatbandit)	February 5, 1981	
(Thailand) Kengkla Sitsei (def. Nongkhai Sor.Prapatsorn)	September 28, 1981	
Kengkla vacated the title in 1982.
(Thailand) Kengkaj Kiatkriangkrai (def. Jock Kiatniwat)	August 25, 1982	
Kengkaj vacated the title in 1983.
(Thailand) Samingnoom Sithiboontham (def. Khaosod Sitpraprom)	March 17, 1983	
(Thailand) Khaosod Sitpraprom (def. Samingnoom Sithiboontham)	May 12, 1983	
Khaosod was stripped of the title on October 13, 1983, when he was dismsissed in the last round of a title defense against Kitti Sor.Thanikul.
(Thailand) Wanpadet Pukrongfah (def. Ratchabut Sor.Thanikul)	December 29, 1983	
(Thailand) Kengkla Sitsei (def. Wanpadet Pukrongfah)	September 3, 1984	def. Wanpadet Pukrongfah on November 15, 1984
(Thailand) Praedam Lukprabat (def. Kengkla Sitsei)	February 4, 1985	
(Thailand) Nokweed Devy (def. Praedam Lukprabat)	August 28, 1985	
(Thailand) Wanpadet Sakroumai (2) (def. Nokweed Devy)	July 23, 1986	
Wanpadet vacated the title in 1987.
(Thailand) Kongdet Chor.Wirat (def. Narak Sitkuanyim)	April 29, 1987	
(Thailand) Praedam Lukprabat (2) (def. Komphet Chor.Suananan)	April 5, 1988	
Praedam vacated the title in 1988.
(Thailand) Thongphet Na Nonthachai (def. Kongdet Chor.Wirat)	May 26, 1988	
(Thailand) Jack Kiatniwat (def. Thongphet Na Nonthachai)	September 21, 1988	
(Thailand) Sangtiennoi Sor.Rungroj (def. Jack Kiatniwat)	January 15, 1989	
Sangtiennoi vacated the title in 1989.
(Thailand) Prasongphet Sor.Thammarangsi (def. Manachai Na Pattaya)	March 29, 1990	def. Chumphuang Chomphuthong on June 14, 1990; def. Sombat Sor.Thanikul on October 31, 1990
(Thailand) Kongnapa Watcharawit (def. Prasongphet Sor.Thammarangsi)	February 4, 1991	
(Thailand) Jongrak Lukprabaht (def. Kongnapa Watcharawit)	June 10, 1991	def. Kongnapa Watcharawit on August 15, 1991; def. Saentanong Por.Chaiwat on March 23, 1992; def. Yodrak Wor.Kuasang on May 25, 1992; def. Poonsawat Kiatniwat on September 30, 1992; def. Yodrak Wor.Kuasang on December 2, 1992; def. Samaisuk Por.Pluemkamol on May 3, 1993; def. Samaisuk Por.Pluemkamol on June 7, 1993
(Thailand) Robert Kaennorasing (def. Jongrak Lukprabaht)	July 21, 1993	def. Jongrak Lukprabaht on October 6, 1993; def. Jongrak Lukprabaht on November 10, 1993
Robert vacated the title in 1994.
(Thailand) Prabpramlek Sitsanthat (def. )	1994	def. Phanmongkol Carryboy on August 29, 1994
(Thailand) Sornram Sor.Udomson (def. Phetnamek Sor.Siriwat)	1990s	
(Thailand) Phanmongkol Carryboy (def. )	1990s	
(Thailand) Manaschai Wachirayothin (def. Khunsuk Sunwelarewadee)	1990s	
(Thailand) Khunsuk Sunwelarewadee (def. Thewaritnoi SKV Gym)	1997	
(Thailand) Palaket Sor.Sitawee (def. )	1990s	
The title was vacant as of September 1, 2000.
(Thailand) Thewaritnoi SKVGym (def. )	2001	def. Petchnamek Sor.Siriwat on August 16, 2001
The title was vacant as of September 1, 2002.
(Thailand) Sagatpetch Sor.Sakulpan (def. Yodthanu Petchnongnut)	September 28, 2002	def. Khunpinit Kiattawan on February 13, 2003; def. Sakawthong Petchnongnut on June 23, 2003
Sagatpetch vacated the title in 2004.
(Thailand) Sibmuan Laemthongkarnpaet (def. )	2004	
(Thailand) Orono Tawan (def. )	2005	
Orono vacated the title in 2005.
(Thailand) Chanwit Sitkuanim (def. )	2006	
(Thailand) Kem Sor.Ploenjit (def. Puja Sor.Suwanee)	November 30, 2006	
Kem vacated the title in 2008.
(Thailand) Kompayak Beamdesign (def. )	2008	
(Thailand) Anuwat Kaewsamrit (def. Kompayak Beamdesign)	March 1, 2010	
Anuwat vacated the title in 2010.
(Thailand) Jomthong Chuwattana (def. Kongnakornban Sor.Kitrungrot)	October 7, 2010	def. Tukkatathong Phetphayathai January 31, 2011
Jomthong vacated the title in 2011.
(Thailand) Kaimukkao Por.Thairungruangkamai (def. Ekkarit Mor.Krungthepthonburi)	July 5, 2012	
Kaimukkao vacated the title in 2013.
(Thailand) Kiatphet Suhananpiekmai (def. )	2013	
Kiatphet vacated the title in 2014.
(Thailand) Kwankhao Mor.Ratanabandit (def. Phetmorakot Petchyindee)	February 5, 2015	
Kwankhao vacated the title in 2015.
(Thailand) Kaimukkao Por.Thairungruangkamai (2) (def. Kaewkangwan Prewayo)	May 9, 2016	
Kaimukkao vacated the title in 2017.
(Thailand) PhetUtong Or.Kwanmuang (def. Kaonar P.K.Saenchai)	December 21, 2017	
Phet-U-Thong vacated the title in 2018.
(Thailand) Rungkit Wor.Sanprapai (def. Rodtang Jitmuangnon)	October 10, 2018	
Rungkit vacated the title in 2019.
(Thailand) Rangkhao Wor.Sangprapai (def. Superlek Kiatmuu9)	July 11, 2019	
(Thailand) Samingdet Nor.Anuwatgym (def. Thanaphet Wor.Sangprapai)	January 2, 2020	
Samingdet vacated the title in 2020.
(Thailand) Yodtongthai Sor.Sommai (def. Phetsukumvit Boybangna)	December 3, 2020	
(Thailand) Phetsukumvit Boybangna (def. Yodwittaya SirilakMuaythai)	March 13, 2022	
Phetsukumvit vacated the title in February 2023, in order to compete on ONE Friday Fights.
(Thailand) Kompatak SinbiMuayThai (def. Somraknoi Muayded789)	April 13, 2024	
(Thailand) Chalam Parunchai (def. Kompatak SinbiMuayThai)	June 8, 2024	def. Thongnoi Wor.Sangprapai on January 11, 2025; def. Kaipa Por.WisetGym on January 31, 2026; def. Kiwthong TKD MuaythaiGym on April 4, 2026
(Thailand) Kaipa Por.WisetGym (def. Comeback T.K Yuthana for the interim title)	September 20, 2025	
(Thailand) Yodkatanyu Jitmuangnon (def. Chalam Parunchai)	July 25, 2026	
Yodkatanyu vacated the title in June 2026, in order to compete on ONE Friday Fights.
(Thailand) Chaila Por.Lakboon (def. Wukong Sor.Prembut)		November 7, 2026

=== Lightweight Championship ===
Weight limit: 135 lb (61.2 kg)

Name	Date	Defenses
(Thailand) Surasak Barbos (def. )	1950s	def. Pansak Wttichai in 1956
(Thailand) Sompong Samanchan (def. )	1956–57	
(Thailand) Adisak Kwangmeechai (def. Nimit Luatmuangtai)	May 28, 1959	
(Thailand) Adul Srisothon (def. Adisak Kwangmeechai)	1960	def. Sompong Jaroenmuang on May 11, 1961
(Thailand) Namsak Yontharakit (def. Adul Srisothon)	November 13, 1961	
Namsak vacated the title.
(Thailand) Adul Srisothon (2) (def. Dejrit Ithianuchit)	December 6, 1962	
Adul vacated the title in 1963.
(Thailand) Dejrit Ithianuchit (def. Adisak Kwangmeechai)	February 28, 1963	def. Wicharn Sor.Pinjisak on September 5, 1963.
Dejrit vacated the title to move up in weight.
(Thailand) Wicharn Sor.Pinjisak (def. Pornsak Laemfahpa)	1964	
(Thailand) Payap Sakulsuek (def. Wicharn Sor.Pinjisak)	May 14, 1964	
(Thailand) Danchai Ploenjit (def. Wicharn Sor.Pinjisak)	1964	
(Thailand) Kanongmek Kachapichit (def. Danchai Ploenjit)	1965–1966	
(Thailand) Den Srisothon (def. Kanongmek Kachapichit)	1969	
(Thailand) Denthoranee Muangsurin (def. Den Srisothon)	December 16, 1969	
Denthoranee awas stripped of his title for losing to Minoru Ote in Japan on November 27, 1973.
(Thailand) Jaidee Pitsanurachan (def. Kwandom Parawit)	April 20, 1974	
(Thailand) Monsawan Lukchiangmai (def. )	1974	
(Thailand) Chalermpon Sor.Tha-it (def. Jaidee Pitsanurachan)	January 6, 1975	def. Monsawan Lukchiangmai on September 17, 1975
The title was vacant as of 1977.
(Japan) Toshio Fujiwara (def. Monsawan Lukchiangmai)	March 18, 1978	
(Thailand) Siprae Kiatsompop (def. Toshio Fujiwara)	June 7, 1978	
Siprae was stripped of the title for losing by knockout to Toshio Fujiwara in Japan on October 30, 1978.
(Thailand) Raktae Muangsurin (def. Yousop Sor.Thanikul)	September 9, 1979	def. Seksan Sor.Theppitak on November 27, 1980; def. Yousop Sor.Thanikul on February 5, 1981
(Thailand) Inseenoi Sor.Thanikul (def. Raktae Muangsurin)	December 8, 1982	def. Padejsuk Pitsanurachan August 4, 1983
(Thailand) Jomtrai Petchyindee (def. Inseenoi Sor.Thanikul)	June 1, 1984	def. Komtae Chor.Suananant on January 3, 1985
(Thailand) Kulabkhao Na Nontachai (def. Jomtrai Petchyindee)	February 28, 1985	def. Praedam Lukprabat on May 30, 1985.
(Thailand) Jomtrai Petchyindee (2) (def. Samingnoom Sithiboontham)	1986	
(Thailand) Wanpadet Phukrongfah (def. Komtae Chor.Suananan)	1987	def. Nokweed Devy on March 28, 1988
Wanpadet vacated the title on 1988
(Thailand) Jongrak Lukprabaht (def. Narak Sitkuanyim)	March 29, 1989	
(Thailand) Narak Sitkuanyim (def. Jongrak Lukprabaht)	June 28, 1989	draws with Thongphet Na Nontachai on July 26, 1989
(Thailand) Jongrak Lukprabaht (2) (def. Narak Sitkuanyim)	1989	
(Thailand) Narak Sitkuanyim (2) (def. Jongrak Lukprabaht)	February 22, 1990	draws with Thawiwut Sitkhamphan on March 29, 1990
(Thailand) Praedam Lukprabat (def. Narak Sitkuanyim)	July 26, 1990	
The title became vacant when Praedam died in a motorcycle accident on March 16, 1991.
(Thailand) Yasin Lukklongtan (def. Komtae Chor.Suananan)	July 3, 1991	
(Thailand) Kaenthong Kiatmonthep (def. Yasin Lukklongtan)	1992	def. Chaksing Sor.Rewadee on February 24, 1993
(Thailand) Phanmongkol Carryboy (def. )	1990s	
(Thailand) Komphet Lukprabat (def. Samaisuk Por.Pleumkamol)	May 25, 1994	
(Thailand) Angkhandet Por.Paoin (def. Komphet Lukprabat)	May 10, 1995	def. Komphet Lukprabat on July 5, 1995
(Thailand) Thappaya SitOr (def. Angkhandet Por.Paoin)	June 22, 1996	
Tappaya vacated the title in 1998.
(Thailand) Thepparit Por.Tawatchai (def. )	1998	
(Thailand) Noppakao Sor.Wanchat (def. )	2001	
(Thailand) Songkom Jockygym (def. Noppakao Sor.Wanchat)	2001	
(Thailand) Mangkong Royalemarptaput (def. )	2003	def. Rambojiew Dongolfservice on March 6, 2003
Mankong vacated the title in 2004.
(Thailand) Jaroenchai Jor.Ratchadakorn (def. Noppakao Sor.Wanchat)	November 23, 2005	def. Hiroki Ishii on August 22, 2005
Jaroenchai was stripped of the title after losing by knockout to Saenchai Sor.Kingstar on March 15, 2007.
(Thailand) Kupee Wor.Steera (def. )	2008	
Kupee vacated the title in 2008.
(Thailand) Jaroenchai Kesagym (def. Winailek Por.Rangsan)	November 26, 2008	
Jaroenchai vacated the title in 2009.
(Thailand) Samsamut Kiatchongkhao (def. Winailek Por.Rangsan)	2010	def. Winailek Por.Rangsan on October 7, 2010
Samsamut vacated the title in 2011.
(Thailand) Nopakrit Kor.Kampanat (def. )	August, 2011	
Nopakrit vacated the title in 2012.
(Thailand) Nong-O Gaiyanghadao (def. Singdam Kiatmuu9)	May 8, 2014	
Nong-O vacated the title in 2014.
(Thailand) Yodlekpet Or.Pitisak (def. Samingdet Dekfaifa)	November 18, 2015	
(Japan) Genji Umeno (def. Yodlekpet Or. Pitisak)	October 23, 2016	
(Thailand) Sakmongkol Sor.Sommai (def. Genji Umeno)	May 17, 2017	
Sakmongkol vacated the title in 2017.
(Thailand) Yodlekpet Or.Pitisak (def. Panpayak SitjatikUbon)	September 11, 2017	
Yodlekpet vacated the title in 2018.
(Thailand) Saeksan Or.Kwanmuang (def. Panpayak SitChefboontham)	November 15, 2018	def. Kaonar P.K.Saenchai on May 29, 2019
Saeksan was stripped for not defending the title in time.
(Thailand) Saeksan Or.Kwanmuang (2) (def. Thanonchai Thanakorngym)	March 5, 2020	
Saeksan vacated the title in 2021.
(Thailand) Kongthoranee Sor.Sommai (def. Gingsanglek Tor.Laksong)	March 20, 2022	
(Thailand) Jom Parunchai (def. Kongthoranee Sor.Sommai)	June 26, 2022	def. Yota Shigemori on February 19, 2023; def. Alfie Pearse on October 7, 2023
(Thailand) Samingdet Nor.Anuwatgym (def. Jom Parunchai)	March 23, 2024	def. Thongnoi Wor.Sangprapai on May 25, 2024; def. Savvas Michael on July 13, 2024; def. Savvas Michael on November 30, 2024
Samingdet vacated the title in 2025.
(Thailand) Sangmanee Sor Tienpo (def. Thanupetch Wor.Sangprapai)	March 29, 2025	def. Chalam Parunchai on May 31, 2025; def. Somraknoi Muayded789 on December 27, 2025
(Thailand) Somraknoi Muayded789 (def. Duangsompong Jitmuangnon for the interim title)	October 11, 2025	
(Russia) Egor Bikrev (def. Sangmanee Sor Tienpo)	April 11, 2026	
(Thailand) Samingdet Nor.Anuwatgym (def. Flukenoi Kiatfahlikit for the interim title)	June 7, 2026	def. Duangsompong Jitmuangnon on August 15, 2026; def. Kiewpayak Jitmuangnon on October 17, 2026
(Japan) Kan Nakamura (def. Egor Bikrev)	October 10, 2026	

=== Super Lightweight Championship ===
Weight limit: 140 lb (63.5 kg)

Name	Date	Defenses
(Thailand) Kongdej Lukbangplasoi (def. Pornsak Laemfahpa)	May 15, 1968	
Inaugural champion. Kongdej vacated the title in 1968.
(Thailand) Pananan Lukpanjama (def. Danchai Ploenjit)	1968	
(Thailand) Monsawan Laemfahpa (def. Pananan Lukpanjama)		
(Thailand) Sorasak Sor.Lukbukkhlo (def. Buriram Suanmiskawan)	June 11, 1973	
(Thailand) Satanfah Sor.Prateep (def. Sorasak Sor.Lukbukkhlo)	November 30, 1974	
Satanfah vacated the title in 1975.
(Thailand) Chartprasert Rungrit (def. Sorasak Sor.Lukbukkhlo)	July 28, 1975	
(Thailand) Phongdetnoi Prasopchai (def. Chartprasert Rungrit)	November 28, 1975	
Pongdejnoi vacated the title in 1978.
(Thailand) Khwandom Sitbaramee (def. Wangkaew Sityodthong)	1970s	
The title was vacant as of August 5, 1981.
(Thailand) Somsong Kiathoranee (def. Kwandom Sitbaramee)	November 15, 1981	
(Thailand) Samart Prasarnmit (def. Somsong Kiathoranee)	June 23, 1982	
Samart vacated the title in 1983.
(Thailand) Rackchai Hapalang (def. Nonglek Sitkrumai)	1983-1984	
(Thailand) Sagat Petchyindee (def. Somsong Kiathoranee)	July 30, 1984	def. Mekong Sor.Borikan on May 8, 1985; def. Komtae Chor.Suananant on August 30, 1985
Sagat vacated the title in 1986.
(Thailand) Fadaeng Sor.Borikan (def. Phet Lukbansuan)	November 2, 1986	
(Thailand) Pothai Chor.Waikul (def. Fadaeng Sor.Borigan)	March 27, 1989	
(Thailand) Prasert Lukmatulee (def.)	1989-1990	
(Thailand) Sittisak Tor.Aanusorn (def. Prasert Lukmatulee)	1990-1991	
(Thailand) Jomhod Kiatadisak (def. Sittisak Tor.Aanusorn)	December 12, 1992	
Jomhod vacated the title in 1993.
The title was vacant as of January 1, 1995.
(Thailand) Kongnapa Watcharawit (def. Saenkeng Pinsinchai)	January 11, 1995	
(Thailand) Saenkeng Pinsinchai (def. Kongnapa Watcharawit)	March 2, 1995	
Saenkeng vacated the title title in 1998.
(Thailand) Nopdet2 Chuwatthana (def. Saifa Sor.Phanuth)	June 10, 1999	
(Thailand) Songnarong Kiatsingnoi (def. )	2000s	
(Thailand) Klangsuan Sasiprapa (def. )	2004	
(Thailand) Chokdee Por.Pramuk (def. )	2004	
(Thailand) Bernueng Sor.Onechart (def. )	2005	
(Thailand) Saiyoknoi Sakchainarong (def. )	2006	def. Berneung Sor.Onechart on March 24, 2007
(Thailand) Singmanee Sor.Srisompong (def. Saiyoknoi Sakchainarong)	October 27, 2007	def. Hiroki Ishii on March 9, 2008; def. Phetasawin Seatranferry on September 21, 2009
Singmanee vacated the title in 2010.
(Thailand) Yodkhunpon Sor.Mongkolket (def. Hiroki Ishii)	March 22, 2010	
(Thailand) Yatkonpon F.A Group (def. )		
(Thailand) Lom-Isan Sor.Chokichai (def. )	2011	
Lom-Isan vacated the title in 2011.
(Japan) Hiroki Ishii (def. Apisak K.T.Gym)	October 2, 2011	def. Kenfang Por.Puangchon on March 11, 2012; def. Plynoi Por. Paoin on September 9, 2012
(Thailand) Aikpikart Mor.Krungthepthonburi (def. Hiroki Ishii)	March 10, 2013	
(Thailand) Petchboonchu F.A.Group (def. Yodwicha Por.Boonsit)	June 11, 2014	
Petchboonchu vacated the title in 2015.
(Thailand) PhonEk Or.Kwanmuang (def. Anthony Defretin)	May 27, 2016	
Phonek vacated the title in 2016.
(Thailand) Chamuaktong Fightermuaythai (def. Yodpanomrung Jitmuangnon)	November 6, 2017	def. Yodpanomrung Jitmuangnon on October 10, 2018
(Thailand) Panpayak SitChefboontham (def. Chamuaktong Fightermuaythai)	August 22, 2019	
Panpayak vacated the title in 2020.
(Thailand) Yodlekpet Or. Pitisak (def. Kulabdam Sor.Jor.Piek-U-Thai)	November 26, 2021	
Yodlekpet vacated the title in 2022.
(Thailand) Thongsiam Kiatsongrit (def. Petchmanee Sor.Jaruwan)	December 24, 2022	
(Thailand) Teeradet Chor.Hapayak (def. Thongsiam Kiatsongrit)	August 30, 2023	
Teeradet vacated the title in 2023.
(Thailand) Petchthongchai T.B.M.Gym (def. Chujaroen Dabransarakarm)	December 16, 2023	
(Thailand) Dam Parunchai (def. Petchthongchai Sor.Sommai)	March 2, 2024	def. Phetphuthai Sitsarawatseua on March 15, 2025; def. Flukenoi Kiatfahlikit on September 6, 2025; def. Rangkhao Wor.Sangprapai on February 14, 2026; def. Chadd Collins on April 18, 2026; def. Capitan Petchyindee Academy on April 18, 2026
(Thailand) Phetphuthai Sitsarawatseua (def. Moradokpetch Muayded789 for the interim title)	November 23, 2024	def. Rungkit Bor.Rungrot on January 4, 2025
(Thailand) Flukenoi Kiatfahlikit (def. Samingdet Nor.Anuwatgym for the interim title)	June 14, 2025	
(Thailand) Rangkhao Wor.Sangprapai (def. Flukenoi Kiatfahlikit for the interim title)	November 29, 2025	
(Slovakia) Jozef Molnar (def. Petchwichai Wor.Chakrawut for the interim title)	June 20, 2026	
(Thailand) Kimluay Wankhongohm (def. Jozef Molna for the interim title)	October 31, 2026	

=== Welterweight Championship ===
Weight limit: 147 lb (66.7 kg)

Name	Date	Defenses
(Thailand) Boonmee Maechamang (def. Yodying Luksurin)	1955	
Inaugural champion.
(Thailand) Samart Sorndaeng (def. )	1955	def. Chanchai Luksurin in 1955
(Thailand) Srisawat Thiamprasit (SitSor.Por.) (def. Boonmee Rajawat)	1958	def. Boonmee Rajawat; def. Kohli Wirachai
Srisawat was stripped of the title after being knocked out by Apidej Sit-Hirun in a non-title fight in December, 1961.
(Thailand) Apidej Sit-Hirun (def. Sornchai Mallayuth)	1962	def. Sornchai Mallayut on March 21, 1963; def. Dejrit Itthianuchit on June 6, 1963; def. Sornchai Mallayut on September 9, 1963
vacated the title in 1966.
(Thailand) Supachai Jaroenmuang (def. Dejrit Itthianuchit)	May 12, 1966	
(Thailand) Apidej Sit-Hirun (2) (def. Dejrit Itthianuchit)	January 15, 1968	
(Thailand) Dejrit Itthianuchit (2) (def. Apidej Sit-Hirun)	November 10, 1968	
On July 5, 1972, Prabsuk Sakulthai and Chuchai Lukpanjama fought to a draw for the title.
The title was vacant as of June 1, 1973.
(Thailand) Buriram Suanmiskawan (def. Kongdejnoi Lukbangplasoi)	June 6, 1973	
(Thailand) Karavek Kwanchai (def. Khunpon Sakornpitak)	1973	
(Thailand) Khunpon Sakornpitak (def. Karavek Kwanjaichonbot)	May 8, 1974	
(Thailand) Satanfah Sor.Prateep (def. Khunpon Sakornpitak)	June 2, 1975	def. Phongdetnoi Prasopchai on May 27, 1976
Satanfah vacated the title in 1975.
(Thailand) Khunpon Sakornpitak (2) (def. )	1976	
(Thailand) Pichit Singchuekluang (def. Khunpon Sakornpitak)	November 24, 1976	
The title was vacant before Mehmoud and Khunpon's fight.
(Thailand) Mehmoud Lukbothong (def. Khunpon Sakornpitak)		
(Thailand) Buriram Suanmiskawan (def. Mehmoud Lukbothong)	1977	
(Thailand) Pongdejnoi Porntawee (def. Saensuk Sor.Sangthai)	June 2, 1978	
Pongdejnoi vacated the title in 1978.
(Thailand) Yodsing Sor.Payathai (def. Buriram Suanmiskawan)	October 4, 1978	
(Thailand) (def. Yodsing Sor.Payathai)	February 12, 1979	
(Thailand) Kiatsiam Joker (def. )		
(Thailand) Somsak Kiatyothin (def. Kiatsiam Joker)		
The title was vacant in 1986.
(Thailand) Payap Premchai (def. Lakchart Sor.Prasartporn)	1986	
The title was vacant in 1987.
(Thailand) Lakchart Sor.Prasartporn (def. Ekapon Sitsei)	March 23, 1987	
Lakchart vacated the title in 1988.
(Thailand) Sittisak Chor.Waikul (def. Siyok Jockygym)	May 11, 1988	
(Thailand) Ekphon Sitsei (def. Sittisak Chor.Waikul)	January 15, 1988	
(Thailand) Payaklek Yuttakit (def. Kiatdisak Nungmuengma)	November 22, 1990	def. Ekphon Sitsei on April 8, 1991
Title was vacant as of January 1992.
(Thailand) Wicharn Chor.Rojanachai (def. Ekphon Sitsei)	June 1992	
(Thailand) Jomhod Kiatadisak (def. Wicharn Chor.Rojanachai)	January 27, 1994	
(Thailand) Kriangkrai Sor.Worapin (def. Denkantho Sakthawi)	1996	def. Rakchat Chor.Rungsak on July 1, 1996
Kriangkrai vacated the title in 1996.
(Thailand) Chalamdam Sittrattrakarn (def. Charanret Sit A.)	March 13, 2000	draws with Kozo Takeda on May 5, 2000
(Japan) Kozo Takeda (def. Chalamdam Sittrattrakarn)	January 1, 2001	
(Thailand) Chanwit KiatTor.Bor.Ubon (def. Kozo Takeda)	16 September 2001	
Chanwit vacated the title in 2002.
(Thailand) Kaoklai Kaennorsing (def. Charnwit KiatTor.Bor.Ubon)	September, 2002	
(Thailand) Chanwit KiatTor.Bor.Ubon (2) (def. Kaoklai Kaennorsing)	November, 2002	
(Thailand) Omsin Sitkoenhin (def. )	2003	
(Thailand) Noppadetsorn Chuwattana (def. Charnvit KiatTor.Bor.Ubon)	2004	def. Charnvit KiatTor.Bor.Ubon on March 20, 2005
(Thailand) Karuhat Aikchumpon (def. Noppadetsorn Chuwattana)	June 16, 2006	
(Thailand) Noppadetsorn Chuwattana (2) (def. Karuhat Aikchumpon)	August 20, 2006	
Noppadetsorn vacated the title in 2008.
(Thailand) BigBen Chor.Praram6 (def. )	2008	
Bigben vacated the title in 2009.
(Thailand) Nampon P.K.Stereo (def. Chanachai Kaewsamrit)	2010	
Nampon vacated the title in 2012.
(Brazil) Jos Mendonca (def. Phetthongkam Oh-Sanitpan)	July 4, 2013	def. Hideya Tanaka on September 28, 2014; def. Nawee EagleMuayThai on June 28, 2015
Mendonca vacated the title in 2016.
(Thailand) Manaowan Sitsongpeenong (def. Azize Hlali)	May 27, 2016	
(France) Fabio Pinca (def. Manaowan Sitsongpeenong)	February 23, 2017	
Pinca vacated the title in 2017.
(Thailand) PhetUbon SitChefboontham (def. Sakmongkol Sor.Sommai)	November 30, 2017	
(Thailand) Sakmongkol Sor.Sommai (def. PhetUbon SitChefboontham)	June 27, 2018	
Sakmongkol vacated the title in 2019.
(Thailand) Tuanpae Sor.Sommai (def. Phetnarin Kluarae1T)	March 14, 2019	
Tuanpae vacated the title in 2019.
(Thailand) Jomthong Chuwattana (def. Phetnarin Kluarae1T)	January 5, 2020	
Jomthong vacated the title in 2020.
(Thailand) Rambo JPowerRoofSamui (def. Saenpon Phetpachara)	December 17, 2020	
Rambo vacated the title in 2021.
(Thailand) Shadow Singmawin (def. Julio Lobo)	March 21, 2022	
Shadow vacated the title in 2023
(Iran) Sajad Sattari (def. Yodkhunpon MoothongAcademy)	April 15, 2023	
Sattari vacated the title in September 2023 to compete on ONE Friday Fights.
(Turkey) Erdem Dincer (def. Ruben La Pira)	November 4, 2023	
(Thailand) Hercules Wor.Jakrawut (def. Erdem Dincer)	December 2, 2023	def. Erdem Dincer on January 27, 2024
(Thailand) Tapaokaew Singmawin (def. Hercules Wor.Jakrawut)	May 4, 2024	def. Nuenglanlek Jitmuangnon on August 9, 2025; def. Alexis Laugeois on November 15, 2025; def. Saenpon Sor.Sommai on March 7, 2026
(Thailand) Nuenglanlek Jitmuangnon (def. Capitan Petchyindee for the interim title)	October 12, 2024	def. Chujaroen Dabransarakarm on February 8, 2025
(Republic of Ireland) Niall McGreevy (def. Tapaokaew Singmawin)	July 11, 2026	
(Russia) Kirill Khomutov (def. Award Kazimba for the interim title)	October 10, 2026	

=== Super Welterweight Championship ===
Weight limit: 154 lb (69.9 kg)

Name	Date	Defenses
(Japan) Hitoshi Ogasawara def. Denskee Hamachaiwira	December 3, 2000	
(Thailand) Chaowalit Jockygym def. Hitoshi Ogasawara	January 28, 2001	
(Thailand) Sagetdao Kiatputon def. Chaowalit Jockygym	December 9, 2001	
Sagetdao vacated the title in 2002.
(Thailand) Kaoklai Kaennorasing def. Chalermsak Chuwattana	December 13, 2002	
(Thailand) Yokkao Bor.Chor.Ror.2 def. Kaoklai Kaennorasing	2003	
(Thailand) BigBen Chor.Praram6 def. Yokkao BorChorRor2	2006	
(Thailand) Changpuek Chor.Sriprasert def.	2003	
(Thailand) Diesellek Rungruangyon def. BigBen Chor.Praram6	2008	
(Thailand) Omsinlek Sitjekan def.	2009	
(Thailand) Chanajon P.K. Saenchai def. Jaochalarm Sor.Pinyo	2010	
(Thailand) Chanachai Kaewsamrit def.	2011	
(Thailand) Kanongsuk Chuwattana def.	2011	def. Shinya Ishige on March 25, 2013
(Thailand) Kongjak Por.Paoin def.	2013	
(Thailand) Aonang KiatPepe def. Shinya Ishige	November 23, 2014	def. Shinya Ishige on January 19, 2015
(Thailand) Nawee EagleMuayThai def.	2015	
(Japan) Takuya "T-98" Imamura def. Nawee EagleMuayThai	June 1, 2016	def. Pum Ansukhumvit on October 9, 2016
(Thailand) Sibmuen Sitchefboontham def. Takuya Imamura	May 25, 2017	
(Thailand) Inthachai Chor.Hapayak def. Sibmuen Sitchefboontham	February 19, 2018	
Inthachai vacated the title in 2018.
(Thailand) Sibmuen Sitchefboontham (2) def. Tsukuru Midorikawa	June 27, 2018	
Sibmuen was stripped of the title when he lost by knockout in a non-title bout against Hinata on February 17, 2019.
(Thailand) Khunsuk Sitchefboontham def. Filipe FamilyMuaythai	Apr 28, 2019	def. Tsukuru Midorikawa on June 1, 2019
Khunsuk vacated the title in 2020. The title was retired in 2021 due to the COVID-19 pandemic.
(Switzerland) (Dominican Republic) Daniel Rodriguez def. Saenpon Petchphachara	Jun 1, 2022	def. Sornkhaw Chor.Hapayak on October 21, 2023 def. PheuThai Por.Panomporn on July 26, 2025 def. Petchmorakot Petchyindee Academy on December 27, 2025 def. Hercules WanKongOhm.WKO on April 18, 2026 def. Angel Bauza on June 27, 2026
(Thailand) Yodwicha YodwichaGym def. Burak Poyraz for interim title.	Mar 30, 2024	def. Emerson Bento on December 20, 2025

=== Middleweight Championship ===
Weight limit: 160 lb (72.6 kg)

Name	Date	Defenses
(Thailand) Sakchai Nakpayak (def. Somsri Thiamkamhaeng)	August 2, 1953	
Inaugural champion. Title became vacant following Sakchai's death on November 14, 1953.
(Thailand) Prayut Udomsak (def. Wittichai Prayut)	1953	
(Thailand) Sema Klasuek (def. Prayut Udomsak)	1954	
(Thailand) Daothong Singpanlop (def. Sema Klasuek)	1954	def. Mekdam Lukjaofah
(Thailand) Suchai Kesongkram (def. Daothong Singpanlop)	1954–1955	
(Thailand) Sema Klasuek (2) (def. Suchai Kesongkram)	1955–1956	
(Thailand) Daoprakai Sor.Pinijsak (def. Srisawat Sit Sor.Por.)	April 30, 1964	
Daoprakai was stripped of the title after being stopped by Apidej Sit-Hirun in a non-title fight on September 8, 1964.
(Thailand) Sornchai Mallayut (def.)	1965	
(Thailand) Bukdiew Yontharakit (def. Sornchai Mullayut)	June 4, 1965	
Bukdiew was stripped of the title in 1966 following his arrest on charges of rape.
(Thailand) Dejthai Ithichai (def. )	1966	
(Thailand) Rawee Dechachai (def. Dejthai Ithichai)	1966	
(Thailand) Arjun Hor.Mahachai (def.)	1968	def. Sukkasem Saifah on November 10, 1968
(Thailand) Yodthong Sahaisuk (def. Arjun Hor.Mahachai)	1969	def. Dejthai Ithichai on December 16, 1969
The title was vacant as of 1977.
(Thailand) David Amornrat (def. )	1977–1978	def. Tabata on June 7, 1978
(Thailand) Weerasak Payonkanchang (def. David Amornrat)	1980	
Weerasak was the last Middleweight champion before the title was discontinued due to the lack of competition in the division.
(Thailand) DuanIsaan Kiatsarika (def. Nuengtrakan Por.MuangUbon)	January 9, 2003	
DuanIsaan vacated the title in 2003.
(Thailand) Lamsongkram Chuwattana (def. Hayato)	December 23, 2004	def. Toshio Matsumoto on March 12, 2005; def. Kaoklai Kaennorsing on February 9, 2006
(Thailand) Nontachai Sit-O (def. Lamsongkram Chuwattana)	March 29, 2007	
Nontachai vacated the title in 2008.
(Thailand) Lamsongkram Chuwattana (2) (def. Tobias Alexandersson)	February 29, 2012	
Lamsongkram vacated the title in 2013.
(Thailand) Kanongsuk Chuwattana (def. )	2013	
The title was vacant as of 2014.
(Thailand) Kanongsuk Chuwattana (def. Chanachai Sitsukato)	March 26, 2015	
Kanongsuk vacated the title in 2015.
(Thailand) Kompetlek Lukprabat (def. )	2015	no contest against Youssef Boughanem on May 27, 2016
(Morocco) (Belgium) Youssef Boughanem (def. Kompetlek Lukprabat)	August 31, 2016	
Boughanem vacated the title in 2018.
(Thailand) Denkaosaen Tor.Peerapat (def. PhetUbon SitChefboontham)	February 18, 2019	
Denkaosaen vacated the title in 2019.
(Japan) Shinya Ishige (def. Siangchai PLSGym)	November 28, 2019	
Ishige vacated the title in 2021.
(Brazil) Emerson Bento (def. Beckham BigWinChampion)	September 23, 2023	
Bento was stripped of the title when he lost by knockout in a non-title fight against Thoeun Theara on November 23, 2023.
(England) Joe Ryan (def. Phetmai SiadamMoopraraRajadamnern)	December 16, 2023	def. Victor Hugo on April 20, 2024
(Thailand) Petchmorakot Bangmadklongtan (def. Joe Ryan)	November 16, 2024	def. Josh Hill on February 1, 2025; def. Nayanesh Ayman on April 12, 2025; def. Kongjak Por.Paoin on July 19, 2025; def. Salimkhan Ibragimov on April 25, 2026
(Thailand) Thananchai Sitsongpeenong (def. Elad Suman for the interim title)	October 25, 2025	
(Switzerland) (Dominican Republic) Daniel Rodriguez (def. Petchmorakot Bangmadklongtan )	September 26, 2026	

=== Female Minimumweight Championship ===
Weight limit: 105 lb (47.6 kg)

Name	Date	Defenses
(Thailand) Phayahong Banchamek (def. Saya Ito for the inaugural title)	October 19, 2024	def. Kaosuay Por.Kobkua on December 28, 2024
(Thailand) Mongkutpetch KhaolakMuaythai (def. Phayahong Banchamek)	April 5, 2025	def. Duangdawnoi Looksaikongdin on June 14, 2025; def. Devina Martin on February 21, 2026; def. Petchsaiparn Sitpanancherng on September 5, 2026

=== Female Flyweight Championship ===
Weight limit: 112 lb (50.8 kg)

Name	Date	Defenses
(Estonia) Marie Ruumet (def. Zaidania Looksaikongdin for the inaugural title)	February 28, 2026	def. Jitti ManopGym on May 2, 2026; def. Roghayeh Mohammadiyan on June 13, 2026; def. Desiree Wodicker on September 26, 2026

=== Female Bantamweight Championship ===
Weight limit: 118 lb (53.5 kg)

Name	Date	Defenses
(Thailand) Somratsamee Manopgym (def. Sevgi Doğan for the inaugural title.)	December 23, 2023	def. Monika Chochlíková on March 9, 2024; def. Kamlaipetch Petchyindee Academy on June 1, 2024
Somratsamee vacated the title in 2025.
(Brazil) Bárbara Aguiar (def. Marie Ruumet)	February 22, 2025	
Aguiar was stripped of the title after missing weight for a title defense on October 4, 2025.
(Brazil) Bárbara Aguiar (2) (def. Morgane Mary-Pouliot)	February 7, 2026	
(Mexico) Laura Burgos (def. Nongmay RongreanKeelaKorat for the interim title)	May 23, 2026	
(Australia) Bryony Soden (def. Laura Burgos)	September 19, 2026	

=== Tournament Champions ===
==== Rajadamnern World Series ====
Rajadamnern World Series 2022
Date	Weight	Champion	Event	Runner-up
2022-12-16	126 lbs	(Thailand) Yothin FA Group	Rajadamnern World Series	(Thailand) Petchrungruang Sor.Jor.Tongprajin
2022-12-23	135 lbs	(Thailand) Lamnamoonlek Or.Atchariya	Rajadamnern World Series	(Thailand) Mongkolkaew Sor.Sommai
2022-12-16	147 lbs	(Thailand) Shadow Singha Mawynn	Rajadamnern World Series	(Thailand) Sibmuen Sitchefboontham
2022-12-23	154 lbs	(Switzerland) Dani Rodriguez	Rajadamnern World Series	(Thailand) Yodwicha Por.Boonsit
2022-12-23	118 lbs	(Thailand) Somratsamee Manopgym	Rajadamnern World Series	(Turkey) Zehra Doğan

Rajadamnern World Series 2023
Date	Weight	Champion	Event	Runner-up
2023-09-30	135 lbs	(Thailand) Lamnamoonlek Or.Atchariya	Rajadamnern World Series	(Thailand) Samingdet Nor.Anuwatgym
2023-09-30	140 lbs	(Thailand) Capitan Petchyindee Academy	Rajadamnern World Series	(Thailand) Nuenglanlek Jitmuangnon
2023-10-07	147 lbs	(Thailand) Rittewada Petchyindee Academy	Rajadamnern World Series	(Thailand) Hercules Wor.Jakrawut
2023-10-07	154 lbs	(Thailand) Thananchai Sitsongpeenong	Rajadamnern World Series	(Thailand) Yodwicha Por.Boonsit
2023-09-30	118 lbs	(Thailand) Somratsamee Manopgym	Rajadamnern World Series	(Thailand) Ngaoprajan Looksaikongdin

Rajadamnern World Series 2024
Date	Weight	Champion	Event	Runner-up
2024-12-14	126 lbs	(Thailand) Chaila Por.Lakboon	Rajadamnern World Series	(Israel) Ruach Gordon
2024-12-07	140 lbs	(Thailand) Petchthongchai Sor.Sommai	Rajadamnern World Series	(Thailand) Dam Parunchai
2024-12-07	147 lbs	(Thailand) Hercules Wor.Jakrawut	Rajadamnern World Series	(Thailand) Tapaokaew Singmawynn
2024-12-14	154 lbs	(Dominican Republic) Dani Rodriguez	Rajadamnern World Series	(Thailand) Rittewada Petchyindee Academy
2024-12-14	118 lbs	(Brazil) Bárbara Aguiar	Rajadamnern World Series	(Thailand) Kwanjai KwanjaiMuayThaiGym

== See also ==
- Lumpinee Stadium
- World Muaythai Council
