= Phonek Or.Kwanmuang =

Thai Muay Thai kickboxer

Phonek
- Born: April 25, 1992 (age 34); Sisaket province, Thailand
- Other names: Phonek Mor.Phuwana (พลเอก ม.ภูวนาฯ); Phoneak Naiphonkonkhonkaen
- Nationality: Thai
- Height: 1.75 m (5 ft 9 in)
- Weight: 64 kg (141 lb; 10.1 st)
- Style: Muay Khao
- Stance: Orthodox
- Fighting out of: Bangkok, Thailand
- Team: Mor.Phuwana

Phonek Or.Kwanmuang (Thai: พลเอก อ.ขวัญเมือง), is a Thai Muay Thai fighter.

== Career ==
On April 27, 2015 Phonek defeated Sibmuen Sitchefboontham by decision at the Rajadamnern Stadium.

On May 27, 2016 Phonek faced Anthony Defretin for the vacant Rajadamnern Stadium 140 lbs title. He won the fight by decision.

On February 23, 2017 Phonek faced Panpayak Sitchefboontham for the vacant WBC Muay Thai World 135 lbs title. He lost the fight by decision.

Phonek was scheduled to face Pettawee Sor Kittichai at The Champion Muaythai on September 26, 2020. He won the fight by decision.

November 17, 2020 Phonek defeated Julio Lobo by decision at a Sor.Sommai promotion show. Many of the observers disagreed with the decision and a rematch was scheduled.

== Titles and accomplishments ==
- Rajadamnern Stadium
  - 2016 Rajadamnern Stadium 140 lbs Champion
- Muay Siam Omnoi Stadium
  - 2017 Omnoi Stadium 147 lbs Champion

== Muay Thai record ==
Muay Thai record
Date	Result	Opponent	Event	Location	Method	Round	Time
2024-09-15	Win	(Thailand) Petchpakmai	Thai Fight League, Thai Fight Arena	Bangkok, Thailand	Decision	5	3:00
2024-08-24	Draw	(Thailand) ThanuNgern Por.Lakboon	Thai Fight League, Thai Fight Arena	Bangkok, Thailand	Decision	5	3:00
2022-08-24	Loss	(Thailand) Taksila SathianMuaythai	Muay Thai Palangmai, Rajadamnern Stadium	Bangkok, Thailand	Decision	5	3:00
2022-07-30	Win	(Thailand) Petchsaifah SorJor.Vichitpadriew	Jitmuangnon Superfight, Or.Tor.Gor.3 Stadium	Nonthaburi, Thailand	Decision	5	3:00
2021-04-02	Loss	(Thailand) Saenpon PetchpacharaAcademy	True4U Muaymunwansuk, Rangsit Stadium	Pathum Thani, Thailand	Decision	5	3:00
2020-11-17	Win	(Brazil) Julio Lobo	Sor.Sommai, CentralPlaza Nakhon Ratchasima	Nakhon Ratchasima, Thailand	Decision	5	3:00
2020-09-26	Win	(Thailand) Pettawee Sor Kittichai	The Champion Muaythai, Max Muay Thai Stadium	Pattaya, Thailand	Decision	3	3:00
2020-08-08	Loss	(Thailand) Chamuaktong Fightermuaythai	SuekJaoMuayThai, Siam Omnoi Stadium	Samut Sakhon, Thailand	Decision	5	3:00
For the Omnoi Stadium 147 lbs Title.
2020-03-07	Loss	(Thailand) Pongsiri P.K.Saenchaimuaythaigym	SuekJaoMuayThai, Omnoi Stadium	Samut Sakhon, Thailand	Decision	5	3:00
For the vacant Omnoi Stadium 147 lbs title.
2020-01-16	Loss	(Thailand) Pongsiri P.K.Saenchaimuaythaigym	Omnoi Stadium	Samut Sakhon, Thailand	Decision	5	3:00
2019-11-07	Win	(Thailand) Pongsiri P.K.Saenchaimuaythaigym	Ruamponkon Prachin	Prachinburi Province, Thailand	Decision	5	3:00
2019-06-04	Win	(Thailand) Rungnapa Pinsinchai	Lumpinee Stadium	Bangkok, Thailand	Decision	5	3:00
2019-04-20	Loss	(Thailand) Singsuriya Mor.Rattanabandit	Omnoi Stadium	Bangkok, Thailand	Decision	5	3:00
2019-02-07	Win	(Thailand) Panpayak Sitchefboontham	Rajadamnern Stadium	Bangkok, Thailand	Decision	5	3:00
2019-01-05	Win	(Thailand) Singsuriya Mor.Rattanabandit	Omnoi Stadium	Bangkok, Thailand	KO	3	
2018-12-12	Loss	(Thailand) Singsuriya Mor.Rattanabandit	Petchaopraya, Rajadamnern Stadium	Bangkok, Thailand	Decision	5	3:00
2018-11-15	Loss	(Thailand) Yodpanomrung Jitmuangnon	Rajadamnern Stadium	Bangkok, Thailand	Decision	5	3:00
2018-09-27	Win	(Australia) Chadd Collins	Sor.Sommai, Rajadamnern Stadium	Bangkok, Thailand	Decision	5	3:00
2018-08-25	Loss	(Thailand) Thananchai Rachanon	Omnoi Stadium	Samut Sakhon, Thailand	Decision	5	3:00
Loses Omnoi Stadium 147 lbs title.
2018-07-25	Win	(Australia) Chadd Collins	Sor.Sommai, Rajadamnern Stadium	Bangkok, Thailand	Decision	5	3:00
2018-07-07	Win	(Italy) Manuele Perra	THAI FIGHT Hat Yai	Hat Yai, Thailand	TKO (Doctor stoppage)	2	
2018-06-04	Win	(Thailand) Singsuriya Mor.Rattanabandit	Petchaopraya, Rajadamnern Stadium	Bangkok, Thailand	Decision	5	3:00
2018-04-14	Win	(Thailand) Aroondej M16	Omnoi Stadium	Samut Sakhon, Thailand	Decision	5	3:00
Wins the vacant Omnoi Stadium 147 lbs title.
2018-03-17	Win	(Thailand) Faipa Sor.Narongrit	Omnoi Stadium	Samut Sakhon, Thailand	KO (Knees)	4	
2018-01-13	Loss	(Thailand) Chalamphet Tor.Laksong	Omnoi Stadium - Isuzu Cup, Semi Final	Samut Sakhon, Thailand	Decision	5	3:00
2017-11-25	Win	(Thailand) Jojo 13CoinsResort	Omnoi Stadium - Isuzu Cup	Samut Sakhon, Thailand	KO	5	
2017-09-23	Win	(Thailand) Satanfah Rachanon	Omnoi Stadium - Isuzu Cup	Samut Sakhon, Thailand	Decision	5	3:00
2017-09-02	Win	(Thailand) Chaidet M16	Omnoi Stadium - Isuzu Cup	Samut Sakhon, Thailand	Decision	5	3:00
2017-07-02	Loss	(Thailand) Wanchalerm Sitsornong	Rangsit Stadium	Pathum Thani, Thailand	Decision	5	3:00
2017-05-31	Loss	(Thailand) Kongsak Sitboonmee	Sor.SommaiRajadamnern Stadium	Bangkok, Thailand	Decision	5	3:00
2017-04-09	Win	(Thailand) Wanchalerm Sitsornong	Rangsit Stadium	Pathum Thani, Thailand	Decision	5	3:00
2017-02-23	Loss	(Thailand) Panpayak Sitjatik	Rajadamnern Stadium	Bangkok, Thailand	Decision	5	3:00
For the vacant WBC Muay Thai World 135 lbs title.
2017-01-25	Win	(Thailand) Kongburi Wor.Sangprapai	Wanmeechai, Rajadamnern Stadium	Bangkok, Thailand	KO (Left elbow)	3	
2017-01-01	Loss	(Thailand) Panpayak Sitjatik	Rajadamnern Stadium	Bangkok, Thailand	Decision	5	3:00
2016-09-24	Loss	(Thailand) Wanchalerm Sitsornong	Omnoi Stadium	Samut Sakhon, Thailand	Decision	5	3:00
2016-08-22	Loss	(Thailand) Panpayak Sitjatik	Rajadamnern Stadium	Bangkok, Thailand	Decision	5	3:00
2016-07-17	Win	(Thailand) Inseetong Por.Phinabhat	Omnoi Stadium	Samut Sakhon, Thailand	Decision	5	3:00
2016-06-18	Win	(Thailand) Manachai Kiatmuu9	Omnoi Stadium	Samut Sakhon, Thailand	Decision	5	3:00
2016-05-27	Win	(France) Anthony Defretin	Best of Siam 8, Rajadamnern Stadium	Bangkok, Thailand	Decision	5	3:00
Wins the vacant Rajadamnern Stadium 140 lbs title.
2016-03-13	Loss	(Thailand) Petchmorakot RungrienkilaKorat	Rajadamnern Stadium	Bangkok, Thailand	Decision	5	3:00
2016-02-07	Win	(Thailand) Sibmuen Sitchefboontham	Rajadamnern Stadium	Bangkok, Thailand	KO	3	
2015-12-27	Loss	(Thailand) Songkom Nayoksanya	Rajadamnern Stadium	Bangkok, Thailand	Decision	5	3:00
2015-10-22	Win	(Thailand) Samingdet Dekfaifa	Chujaroen, Rajadamnern Stadium	Bangkok, Thailand	Decision	5	3:00
2015-09-10	Win	(Thailand) Yodlekpet Or. Pitisak	Rajadamnern Stadium	Bangkok, Thailand	Decision	5	3:00
2015-07-15	Loss	(Thailand) Panpayak Sitjatik	Rajadamnern Stadium	Bangkok, Thailand	Decision	5	3:00
2015-06-10	Win	(Thailand) Panpayak Sitjatik	Rajadamnern Stadium	Bangkok, Thailand	Decision	5	3:00
2015-04-27	Win	(Thailand) Sibmuen Sitchefboontham	Rajadamnern Stadium	Bangkok, Thailand	Decision	5	3:00
2015-03-15	Loss	(Thailand) Orono Yor.Yong101	Rajadamnern Stadium	Bangkok, Thailand	Decision	5	3:00
2015-02-15	Loss	(Thailand) Pethchbunchu RungrienkilaKorat	Rajadamnern Stadium	Bangkok, Thailand	Decision	5	3:00
2015-01-24	Win	(Thailand) Saphanphet Sititsukto	Omnoi Stadium	Samut Sakhon, Thailand	Decision	5	3:00
2014-11-16	Loss	(Thailand) Sangthongnoi Thanasuranakorn	Rajadamnern Stadium	Bangkok, Thailand	Decision	5	3:00
2014-10-16	Loss	(Thailand) Jompichit Chuwattana	Chujaroen, Rajadamnern Stadium	Bangkok, Thailand	Decision	5	3:00
2014-09-06	Loss	(Thailand) Petchmai Lukbunmee	Omnoi Stadium	Samut Sakhon, Thailand	Decision	5	3:00
2014-08-14	Loss	(Thailand) Kaimukkao Por.Thairongruangkamai	Chujaroen, Rajadamnern Stadium	Bangkok, Thailand	Decision	5	3:00
2014-07-21	Win	(Thailand) Khumsap Suwit Gym	Sor.Sommai, Rajadamnern Stadium	Bangkok, Thailand	Decision	5	3:00
2014-06-19	Win	(Thailand) Daotrang Chor Na Phatthalung	Tor.Chaiwat, Rajadamnern Stadium	Bangkok, Thailand	Decision	5	3:00
2014-05-29	Win	(Thailand) Chok Sor.Jor.WichitPaedRiew	Omnoi Stadium	Samut Sakhon, Thailand	KO	4	
2014-04-30	Draw	(Thailand) Khunsueklek Aor Kwanmuang	Rajadamnern Stadium	Bangkok, Thailand	Decision	5	3:00
2014-02-22	Win	(Thailand) Hannatee Kiatjaroenchai	Omnoi Stadium	Samut Sakhon, Thailand	KO (Elbow)	2	
2014-01-11	Loss	(Thailand) Hannatee Kiatjaroenchai	Omnoi Stadium	Samut Sakhon, Thailand	Decision	5	3:00
2013-09-28	Win	(Thailand) Rungsangtawan Sit Or Boonchuay	Omnoi Stadium	Samut Sakhon, Thailand	KO (Knees)	4	
Legend: Win Loss Draw/No contest Notes
