= Praewprao PetchyindeeAcademy =

Thai Muay Thai fighter

Praewprao Petchyindee Academy
- Born: Jemsak Petdokchan; December 19, 1998 (age 27); Rattanaburi District, Thailand
- Other names: Praewpraw Muayded789; Praewpraw PetchPrawFah
- Height: 163 cm (5 ft 4 in)
- Weight: 51 kg (112 lb; 8.0 st)
- Division: Mini Flyweight; Light Flyweight; Flyweight; Super Flyweight
- Style: Muay Thai
- Fighting out of: Bangkok, Thailand
- Team: Petchyindee Academy

Kickboxing record
- Total: 109
- Wins: 88
- Losses: 16
- Draws: 5

Praewprao Petchyindee Academy (แพรวพราว เพชรยินดีอะคาเดมี่) is a Thai Muay Thai fighter. He is the former Rajadamnern Stadium and WBC Muaythai Light Flyweight champion.

== Muay Thai career ==
On November 25, 2016, Praewprao fought Samingdet Nor.Anuwatgym for the True4U Mini Flyweight title at the Rangsit Stadium. He won the fight by a second-round knockout.

On June 6, 2018, Praewprao fought Banluerit Sitwatcharachai for the vacant WBC Muaythai World Light Flyweight title. He won the fight by a third-round knockout. Three months later, Praewprao lost, by decision, a rematch against Chanalert Meenayothin for the vacant Rajadamnern Stadium 108 lbs title.

Two months after his first Rajadamnern Stadium title fight, Praewprao once again fought for the title, held at the time by Phetanuwat Nor.Anuwatgym. Praewprao won by decision.

For his first Rajadamnern title defense, Praewprao was fought Sungfah Nor.Anuwatgym. Sungfah won the fight, and title, by decision.

Five months after his Rajadamnern title loss, Praewprao fought a rematch with Sangfah Nor.Anuwatgym for the Rajadamnern Stadium 108 lbs title. The fight was simultaneously a defense of his WBC Muay Thai World title. He beat Sangfah by unanimous decision.

== Titles and accomplishments ==
- True4U Muaymanwansuk
  - 2016 True4U Mini Flyweight Champion
- World Boxing Council Muay Thai
  - 2018 WBC Muay Thai World 108 lbs Champion
    - One successful title defense
- World Muay Thai Council
  - WMC World Champion
- Rajadamnern Stadium
  - 2018 Rajadamnern Stadium 108 lbs Champion
  - 2019 Rajadamnern Stadium 108 lbs Champion
  - 2023 Rajadamnern Stadium Super Flyweight (115 lbs) Champion
    - One successful title defense

== Fight record ==
Muay Thai Record
Date	Result	Opponent	Event	Location	Method	Round	Time
2026-10-29	Loss	(Thailand) PetchEk Kiatjamroon	Petchyindee, Rajadamnern Stadium	Bangkok, Thailand	TKO	2	
2026-08-20	Win	(Thailand) Petchnaka Sitjaroensap	Petchyindee, Rajadamnern Stadium	Bangkok, Thailand	KO	2	
2026-06-25	Draw	(Thailand) Petchsidaeng Sitcharoensap	Petchyindee, Rajadamnern Stadium	Bangkok, Thailand	Decision	5	3:00
2026-05-04	Win	(Thailand) Lom-Isan Payakphuluang	Muaymansananmuang	Chonburi province, Thailand	KO	1	
2026-02-26	Loss	(Thailand) Chatngernlek PanniwatMuayThaiGym	Petchyindee, Rajadamnern Stadium	Bangkok, Thailand	Decision	5	3:00
2025-12-04	Win	(Thailand) Jaising Lukchaomaesaithong	Petchyindee, Rajadamnern Stadium	Bangkok, Thailand	KO	4	
2025-07-19	Loss	(Thailand) Singburi Sasiprapa	Rajadamnern World Series	Bangkok, Thailand	Decision (Unanimous)	3	3:00
2025-03-29	Loss	(Thailand) Singburi Sasiprapa	Rajadamnern World Series	Bangkok, Thailand	Decision (Unanimous)	3	3:00
2024-12-07	Win	(Iran) Javad Mozafari	Rajadamnern World Series	Bangkok, Thailand	Decision (Unanimous)	3	3:00
2024-07-28	Loss	(France) Petchneung PetchMuayThai	Channel 7 Stadium	Bangkok, Thailand	TKO (Referee stoppage)	3	
2024-02-12	Loss	(Japan) Nadaka Yoshinari	Rajadamnern World Series Japan	Tokyo, Japan	Decision (Unanimous)	5	3:00
Loses the Rajadamnern Stadium Super Flyweight (115 lbs) title.
2023-12-27	Loss	(Thailand) Dinnuathong SorJor.OleyYasothon	Rajadamnern Stadium 78th Birthday Show	Bangkok, Thailand	KO (Left cross)	3	
2023-10-14	Win	(Thailand) Dinnuathong SorJor.OleyYasothon	Rajadamnern World Series	Bangkok, Thailand	Decision (Unanimous)	5	3:00
Defends the Rajadamnern Stadium Super Flyweight (115 lbs) title.
2023-09-12	Loss	(Thailand) Paeyim Sor.Boonmeerit	Muayded Sangwienduad, Rangsit Stadium	Pathum Thani, Thailand	Decision	5	3:00
2023-08-09	Win	(Thailand) Petchbanrai Singmawynn	Rajadamnern Ruamjai Puan Faen Muay, Rajadamnern Stadium	Bangkok, Thailand	TKO (Left hook)	2	
2023-07-13	Loss	(Thailand) PetchAnuwat Nor.AnuwatGym	Petchyindee, Rajadamnern Stadium	Bangkok, Thailand	Decision	5	3:00
2023-06-08	Win	(Thailand) Petchrung Sitkrunote	Petchyindee, Rajadamnern Stadium	Bangkok, Thailand	KO (Elbow)	4	1:50
Wins the vacant Rajadamnern Stadium Super Flyweight (115 lbs) title.
2023-04-20	Win	(Thailand) Dokmaipa SorJor.TongPrachin	Petchyindee, Rajadamnern Stadium	Bangkok, Thailand	TKO (Referee stoppage)	3	1:57
2023-03-23	Win	(Thailand) Atewada Tor Surat	Petchyindee, Rajadamnern Stadium	Bangkok, Thailand	Decision	5	3:00
2023-02-11	Win	(Iran) Nima Jahanshas	Rajadamnern World Series + Petchyindee	Bangkok, Thailand	Decision (unanimous)	3	3:00
2022-09-20	Loss	(Thailand) Waewwow Wor.Wangprom	Muaymansananmuang, Rangsit Stadium	Pathum Thani, Thailand	Decision	5	3:00
2022-06-23	Win	(Thailand) Dinnuathong SorJor.OleyYasothon	Petchyindee, Rajadamnern Stadium	Bangkok, Thailand	Decision	5	3:00
2022-05-12	Loss	(Thailand) Dinnuathong SorJor.OleyYasothon	Petchyindee, Rajadamnern Stadium	Bangkok, Thailand	Decision	5	3:00
2022-03-03	Win	(Thailand) Kaenkaew Sor.Boonmeerit	Petchyindee, Rajadamnern Stadium	Bangkok, Thailand	Decision	5	3:00
2021-10-08	Win	(Thailand) Fourwin Sitjaroensap	True4U Muaymanwansuk, Rangsit Stadium	Buriram, Thailand	TKO (knees)	2	
2021-04-08	Win	(Thailand) Cherry Mor.RajabhatSurin	Mahakam MuayRuamPonKon Chana + Petchyindee	Songkhla province, Thailand	Decision	5	3:00
2021-03-12	Loss	(Thailand) Petchsila Wor.Auracha	True4U Muaymanwansuk, Rangsit Stadium	Rangsit, Thailand	Decision	5	3:00
2020-09-18	Loss	(Thailand) Tabtimthong SorJor.Lekmuangnon	True4U Muaymanwansuk, Rangsit Stadium	Rangsit, Thailand	KO (Elbow)	2	
2020-08-14	Win	(Thailand) MalaiNgern Somwanggaiyang	True4U Muaymanwansuk, Rangsit Stadium	Rangsit, Thailand	KO (Punches)	3	
2020-07-17	Win	(Thailand) Sangfah Nor.AnuwatGym	True4U Muaymanwansuk, Rangsit Stadium	Rangsit, Thailand	Decision	5	3:00
2020-01-27	Win	(Thailand) Waewwow Wor.Wangprom	Rajadamnern Stadium	Bangkok, Thailand	Decision	5	3:00
2019-12-05	Win	(Thailand) Sangfah Nor.Anuwatgym	Rajadamnern Stadium	Bangkok, Thailand	Decision (Unanimous)	5	3:00
Wins the Rajadamnern Stadium 108 lbs title and defends WBC Muay Thai World title.
2019-11-08	Win	(Thailand) Hongtae Rinmuaythai	Lumpinee Stadium	Bangkok, Thailand	KO (Straight to the Body)	2	
2019-10-18	Loss	(Thailand) Hongtae Rinmuaythai	Rajadamnern Stadium	Bangkok, Thailand	Decision	5	3:00
2019-09-13	Win	(Thailand) Suntos Sor.Saranphat		Thailand	KO	4	
2019-07-11	Loss	(Thailand) Sungfah Nor.Anuwatgym	Rajadamnern Stadium	Bangkok, Thailand	Decision	5	3:00
Lost the Rajadamnern Stadium 108 lbs title.
2019-06-13	Loss	(Thailand) Suntos Sor.Saranphat	Rajadamnern Stadium	Bangkok, Thailand	Decision	5	3:00
2019-02-21	Win	(Thailand) Phetanuwat Nor.Anuwatgym	Rajadamnern Stadium	Bangkok, Thailand	Decision	5	3:00
2018-12-26	Win	(Thailand) Sayanlek Sayangym	Rajadamnern Stadium	Bangkok, Thailand	Decision	5	3:00
2018-11-22	Win	(Thailand) Phetanuwat Nor.Anuwatgym	Rajadamnern Stadium	Bangkok, Thailand	Decision	5	3:00
Wins the vacant Rajadamnern Stadium 108 lbs title.
2018-10-25	Win	(Thailand) Phetpanlan Big-M Gym	Rajadamnern Stadium	Bangkok, Thailand	KO (Knees and Elbows)	3	
2018-09-13	Loss	(Thailand) Chanalert Meenayothin	Rajadamnern Stadium	Bangkok, Thailand	Decision	5	3:00
For the vacant Rajadamnern Stadium 108 lbs title.
2018-08-09	Win	(Thailand) Chanalert Meenayothin	Rajadamnern Stadium	Bangkok, Thailand	Decision	5	3:00
2018-06-08	Win	(Thailand) Banluerit Sitwatcharachai	Rajadamnern Stadium	Bangkok, Thailand	TKO (Knees)	3	
Wins the WBC Muay Thai World 108 lbs title.
2018-05-09	Win	(Thailand) Sangfah Anuwatgym	Rajadamnern Stadium	Bangkok, Thailand	TKO (Doctor Stoppage)	4	
2018-01-31	Loss	(Thailand) Sangfah Anuwatgym	Rajadamnern Stadium	Bangkok, Thailand	Decision	5	3:00
2018-01-31	Win	(Thailand) Kaipa 13CoinsResort	Rajadamnern Stadium	Bangkok, Thailand	Decision	5	3:00
2017-12-04	Loss	(Thailand) Rit Jitmuangnon	Rajadamnern Stadium	Bangkok, Thailand	Decision	5	3:00
2017-11-09	Win	(Thailand) Rit Jitmuangnon	Rajadamnern Stadium	Bangkok, Thailand	Decision	5	3:00
2017-08-08	Win	(Thailand) Nengern Lukjaomaesaivari	Lumpinee Stadium	Bangkok, Thailand	Decision	5	3:00
2017-07-26	Draw	(Thailand) Nengern Lukjaomaesaivari	Rajadamnern Stadium	Bangkok, Thailand	Decision	5	3:00
2017-06-21	Loss	(Thailand) Yoktong Pinsinchai	Rajadamnern Stadium	Bangkok, Thailand	Decision	5	3:00
2017-04-19	Loss	(Thailand) Yoktong Pinsinchai	Rajadamnern Stadium	Bangkok, Thailand	Decision	5	3:00
2017-03-02	Win	(Thailand) Offsai Sor.Jor.Wichitpadriew	Rajadamnern Stadium	Bangkok, Thailand	Decision	5	3:00
2017-01-05	Loss	(Thailand) Banluerit Sitwatcharachai	Rajadamnern Stadium	Bangkok, Thailand	KO (High kick)	4	
2016-11-25	Win	(Thailand) Samingdet Nor.Anuwatgym	Rangsit Stadium	Rangsit, Thailand	KO	2	
Wins the True4U Mini Flyweight title.
2016-09-09	Loss	(Thailand) Saenchon Erawan	Rangsit Stadium	Rangsit, Thailand	Decision	5	3:00
2016-07-14	Loss	(Thailand) Domthong Lukjaophorrongtom	Rajadamnern Stadium	Bangkok, Thailand	Decision	5	3:00
2016-06-22	Draw	(Thailand) Rakthukon UbonRatchat	Central Stadium	Roi Et, Thailand	Decision	5	3:00
2016-05-23	Win	(Thailand) Rit Sor.Visetkit	Rajadamnern Stadium	Bangkok, Thailand	KO	3	
2016-04-25	Win	(Thailand) Rit Sor.Visetkit	Rajadamnern Stadium	Bangkok, Thailand	Decision	5	3:00
2016-03-22	Draw	(Thailand) Saenson Erawan	Lumpinee Stadium	Bangkok, Thailand	Decision	5	3:00
2016-02-29	Win	(Thailand) Somraknoi Muay789	Rajadamnern Stadium	Bangkok, Thailand	KO	3	
2016-01-21	Loss	(Thailand) Rit Sor.Visetkit	Rajadamnern Stadium	Bangkok, Thailand	Decision	5	3:00
2015-12-12	Loss	(Thailand) Saenson Erawan	Siam Omnoi Boxing Stadium	Samut Sakhon, Thailand	Decision	5	3:00
2015-11-09	Loss	(Thailand) Saenson Erawan	Rajadamnern Stadium	Bangkok, Thailand	Decision	5	3:00
2015-10-15	Win	(Thailand) Banluerit Sitwatcharachai	Rajadamnern Stadium	Bangkok, Thailand	KO	3	
2015-09-15	Win	(Thailand) Jakphet MiamiCondoBangpu	Lumpinee Stadium	Bangkok, Thailand	KO	4	
2015-06-29	Loss	(Thailand) Banluerit Sitwatcharachai		Udon Thani, Thailand	Decision	5	3:00
2015-05-21	Win	(Thailand) Banluerit Sitwatcharachai	Rajadamnern Stadium	Bangkok, Thailand	Decision	5	3:00
2015-04-08	Win	(Thailand) Robert Fightermuaythai	Rajadamnern Stadium	Bangkok, Thailand	KO	2	
Legend: Win Loss Draw/No contest Notes

== See also ==
- List of male kickboxers
- List of WBC Muaythai world champions
