= Chanalert Meenayothin =

Thai Muay Thai fighter

Chanalert
- Born: Phakpoom Mahotorn; October 19, 2001 (age 24); Sukhothai Province, Thailand
- Other names: Chanalert Kiatbadin; Chanalert PKsaenchaiMuayThaiGym
- Nationality: Thai
- Height: 165 cm (5 ft 5 in)
- Weight: 55 kg (121 lb; 8.7 st)
- Division: Mini Flyweight; Flyweight
- Style: Muay Thai
- Fighting out of: Bangkok, Thailand
- Team: Meenayothin

Kickboxing record
- Total: 69
- Wins: 46
- Losses: 21
- Draws: 2

Chanalert Meenayothin (Thai: ชนะเลิศ มีนะโยธิน) is a Thai Muay Thai fighter.

== Biography and career ==
Chanalert started Muay Thai training at the age of 8 with his father who was a Lumpinee Stadium champion unde the name Lertchai Kiatbodin.

On March 12, 2018, Chanalert challenged Yoktong Pinsinchai for the Rajadamnern Stadium 108 lbs title. Yoktong won the fight by unanimous decision.

Six months later, he fought a rematch with Praewprao PetchyindeeAcademy for the vacant Rajadamnern Stadium 108 lbs title. Although he lost the first fight, Chanalert won the rematch by decision.

On December 13, 2019, he fought Rungnarai Kiatmuu9 for the Lumpinee Stadium Flyweight title. Chanalert won the fight by split decision.

== Titles and accomplishments ==
- 2018 Rajadamnern Stadium 108 lbs Champion
- 2019 Lumpinee Stadium 115 lbs Champion
- 2023 Omnoi Stadium 122 lbs Champion

Awards

- 2019 SMM Sport Best Young Boxer of the Year

== Fight record ==
Muay Thai Record
| Date | Result | Opponent | Event | Location | Method | Round | Time |
|---|---|---|---|---|---|---|---|
| 2023-03-25 | Win | (Thailand) RakChumphon Tasaeyasat | Omnoi Stadium | Samut Sakhon, Thailand | Decision | 5 | 3:00 |
Wins Siam Omnoi Stadium 122 lbs title.
| 2022-10-28 | Win | (Thailand) Kongpayak TohRatchatan | True4U Muaymanwansuk, Rangsit Stadium | Pathum Thani, Thailand | Decision | 5 | 3:00 |
| 2021-04-02 | Loss | (Thailand) Pirapat Muayded789 | True4U Muaymanwansuk, Rangsit Stadium | Pathum Thani, Thailand | Decision | 5 | 3:00 |
| 2020-11-05 | Loss | (Thailand) Phetsomjit Jitmuangnon | True4U Muaymanwansuk, Rangsit Stadium | Pathum Thani, Thailand | Decision | 5 | 3:00 |
| 2020-09-15 | Loss | (Thailand) Phetsommai Sor.Sommai | Chef Boontham, Omnoi Stadium | Samut Sakhon, Thailand | Decision | 5 | 3:00 |
| 2020-07-24 | Win | (Thailand) Yodpot Nor.AnuwatGym | True4U Muaymanwansuk, Rangsit Stadium | Pathum Thani, Thailand | Decision | 5 | 3:00 |
| 2020-02-26 | Loss | (Thailand) Rungnarai Kiatmuu9 | Rajadamnern Stadium | Bangkok, Thailand | Decision | 5 | 3:00 |
| 2019-12-13 | Win | (Thailand) Rungnarai Kiatmuu9 | Lumpinee Stadium | Bangkok, Thailand | Decision (Split) | 5 | 3:00 |
Wins Lumpinee Stadium 115 lbs title.
| 2019-11-06 | Win | (Thailand) Satanmuanglek PetchyindeeAcademy | Rajadamnern Stadium | Bangkok, Thailand | Decision | 5 | 3:00 |
| 2019-10-03 | Loss | (Thailand) Satanmuanglek PetchyindeeAcademy | Rajadamnern Stadium | Bangkok, Thailand | Decision | 5 | 3:00 |
| 2019-09-10 | Win | (Thailand) Mohawk Tded99 | Lumpinee Stadium | Bangkok, Thailand | KO (Right Cross) | 3 | |
| 2019-05-31 | Win | (Thailand) Yodpot Nor.AnuwatGym | Lumpinee Stadium | Bangkok, Thailand | Decision | 5 | 3:00 |
| 2019-03-11 | Win | (Thailand) Anuwat Natkinpla | Rajadamnern Stadium | Bangkok, Thailand | Decision | 5 | 3:00 |
| 2019-02-01 | Loss | (Thailand) Phetsomjit Jitmuangnon | Rajadamnern Stadium | Bangkok, Thailand | Decision | 5 | 3:00 |
| 2019-01-02 | Win | (Thailand) Hercules Phetsimean | Rajadamnern Stadium | Bangkok, Thailand | Decision | 5 | 3:00 |
| 2018-10-10 | Win | (Thailand) Sayanlek Sayangym | Rajadamnern Stadium | Bangkok, Thailand | Decision | 5 | 3:00 |
| 2018-09-13 | Win | (Thailand) Praewprao PetchyindeeAcademy | Rajadamnern Stadium | Bangkok, Thailand | Decision | 5 | 3:00 |
Wins vacant Rajadamnern Stadium 108 lbs title.
| 2018-08-09 | Loss | (Thailand) Praewprao PetchyindeeAcademy | Rajadamnern Stadium | Bangkok, Thailand | Decision | 5 | 3:00 |
| 2018-06-08 | Win | (Thailand) Thayat Or.Prasoet | Rajadamnern Stadium | Bangkok, Thailand | KO | 3 | |
| 2018-05-09 | Win | (Thailand) Thabna Sor.Warittha | Rajadamnern Stadium | Bangkok, Thailand | KO (Knees) | 3 | |
| 2018-03-12 | Loss | (Thailand) Yoktong Pinsinchai | Rajadamnern Stadium | Bangkok, Thailand | Decision | 5 | 3:00 |
For the Rajadamnern Stadium 108 lbs title.
| 2018-01-31 | Win | (Thailand) Sangfah Nor.Anuwatgym | Rajadamnern Stadium | Bangkok, Thailand | Decision | 5 | 3:00 |
| 2017-12-22 | Loss | (Thailand) Thabna So.Warittha | True4U Muaymanwansuk, Rangsit Stadium | Thailand | Decision | 5 | 3:00 |
| 2017-11-24 | Win | (Thailand) Dansiam AyothayaFightGym | True4U Muaymanwansuk, Rangsit Stadium | Thailand | Decision | 5 | 3:00 |
| 2017-09-15 | Win | (Thailand) Tubna So.Warittha | Rangsit Stadium | Thailand | KO (Knees) | 3 | |
| 2017-08-18 | Win | (Thailand) Payak Saksatoon | Rangsit Stadium | Thailand | Decision | 5 | 3:00 |
| 2017-06-19 | Win | (Thailand) Suntos So.SaranPhat | Rajadamnern Stadium | Bangkok, Thailand | Decision | 5 | 3:00 |
| 2017-05-11 | Loss | (Thailand) Kaipa 13coinsResort | Rajadamnern Stadium | Bangkok, Thailand | Decision | 5 | 3:00 |
| 2017-04-07 | Win | (Thailand) Dansiam AyothayaFightGym | Rangsit Stadium | Thailand | Decision | 5 | 3:00 |
| 2017-02-06 | Loss | (Thailand) Ekyala Yuikanchang | Rajadamnern Stadium | Bangkok, Thailand | Decision | 5 | 3:00 |
| 2017-01-12 | Win | (Thailand) Radabphet Sitjaroensub | Rajadamnern Stadium | Bangkok, Thailand | KO (Right Cross) | 3 | |
| 2016-11-21 | Win | (Thailand) Detpanum Wor.Sangpapai | Rajadamnern Stadium | Bangkok, Thailand | Decision | 5 | 3:00 |
| 2016-10-06 | Win | (Thailand) Radabphet Sitjaroensub | Rajadamnern Stadium | Bangkok, Thailand | Decision | 5 | 3:00 |
| 2016-09-05 | Win | (Thailand) Phetchtae petchcharoenvit | Rajadamnern Stadium | Bangkok, Thailand | Decision | 5 | 3:00 |
| 2016-07-14 | Loss | (Thailand) Kaipa 13coinsResort | Rajadamnern Stadium | Bangkok, Thailand | Decision | 5 | 3:00 |
| 2016-05-23 | Win | (Thailand) Dawviset Buribhatburirum | Rajadamnern Stadium | Bangkok, Thailand | Decision | 5 | 3:00 |
| 2016-04-19 | Loss | (Thailand) Dokmaipah Sor.Tor.Watchirin | Lumpinee Stadium | Bangkok, Thailand | Decision | 5 | 3:00 |
| 2016-03-18 | Win | (Thailand) Werachai Sor.Watcharagym | Lumpinee Stadium | Bangkok, Thailand | Decision | 5 | 3:00 |
| 2016-01-22 | Loss | (Thailand) Payaknangrong Ponnangrong | Lumpinee Stadium | Bangkok, Thailand | Decision | 5 | 3:00 |
Legend: Win Loss Draw/No contest Notes

== See also ==
- List of male kickboxers
