= Jaroensuk BoonlannaMuaythai =

Thai Muay Thai Kickboxer

Jaroensuk
- Born: June 14, 2006 (age 20); Chiang Mai, Thailand
- Other names: Charoensuk SorJor.Tongprachin (เจริญสุข สจ.โต้งปราจีน); Jarernsuk
- Height: 168 cm (5 ft 6 in)
- Weight: 54 kg (119 lb; 8.5 st)
- Division: Flyweight; Super Flyweight; Bantamweight
- Stance: Southpaw
- Fighting out of: Chiang Mai, Thailand
- Team: Boon Lanna Muay Thai Gym

Kickboxing record
- Total: 70
- Wins: 56
- Losses: 13
- Draws: 1

Jaroensuk Boonlannamuaythai (Thai: เจริญสุข บุญลานนามวยไทย; born June 14, 2006) is a Thai Muay Thai fighter and kickboxer

== Career ==
On November 1, 2022, Jaroensuk faced Fourwin Sitjaroensap at the Rangsit stadium. He won the fight by decision.

On June 6, 2023, Jaroensuk faced Boonlong Petchyindee for the Muaymansananmuang promotion at Rangsit Stadium. He lost the fight by decision.

Jaroensuk faced Chaitone Wor.Uracha at Muay Thai Rakya in Chiang Mai on October 26, 2023. He won the fight by knockout in the fourth round with knees to the body.

Jaroensuk made his kickboxing debut at RISE World Series 2023 - Final Round on December 16, 2023, against Kazuki Osaki. He lost the fight by split decision, after an extra fourth round was contested.

Jaroensuk faced Anuwat V.K.KhaoYai on January 9, 2023, at Rangsit stadium for th Muaymansananmuang promotion. He won the fight by decision. As of February 2024 he was ranked as the third best 122 lbs muay thai fighter in the world by the WMO.

Jaroensuk faced Yugo Kato at RISE ELDORADO 2024 on March 17, 2024. He won the fight by unanimous decision. As of April 2024 he was ranked the tenth best 55 kg kickboxer in the world by Beyond Kickboxing.

== Titles and accomplishments ==
- Rajadamnern Stadium
  - 2025 Rajadamnern Stadium Bantamweight (118 lbs) Champion
    - Three successful title defense
- True4U Petchyindee/Pryde TV
  - 2023 True4U/PRYDE TV 118 lbs Champion
    - One successful title defense
- World Muaythai Organization
  - 2025 WMO Fighter of the Year

== Fight record ==
Muay Thai Record
56 Wins, 13 Losses, 1 Draw
Date	Result	Opponent	Event	Location	Method	Round	Time
2026-12-20		(Japan) Masahiko Suzuki	RISE World Series 2026 Tokyo Final -55kg Tournament, Quarterfinals	Tokyo, Japan			
2026-11-15	Win	(France) Isaac Mohammed	Channel 7 Stadium	Bangkok, Thailand	Decision	5	3:00
2026-08-29	Loss	(Thailand) Pangtor Por.Lakboon	Rajadamnern World Series, Rajadamnern Stadium	Bangkok, Thailand	Decision (Unanimous)	5	3:00
Loses the Rajadamnern Stadium Bantamweight (118 lbs) title.
2026-05-09	Win	(Thailand) Puenyai Por.Lakboon	Rajadamnern World Series, Rajadamnern Stadium	Bangkok, Thailand	KO (Elbow)	2	0:40
Defends the Rajadamnern Stadium Bantamweight (118 lbs) title.
2026-02-28	Win	(Thailand) Captainteam Adsanpatong	Rajadamnern World Series, Rajadamnern Stadium	Bangkok, Thailand	KO (Knee to the head)	3	2:15
Defends the Rajadamnern Stadium Bantamweight (118 lbs) title.
2025-12-27	Win	(Japan) Kazuki Osaki	Rajadamnern World Series, Rajadamnern Stadium 80th Anniversary	Bangkok, Thailand	Decision (Unanimous)	5	3:00
Defends the Rajadamnern Stadium Bantamweight (118 lbs) title.
2025-08-30	Win	(Thailand) Chalamdam Nayokathasala	Rajadamnern World Series, Rajadamnern Stadium	Bangkok, Thailand	KO (Left cross)	1	1:04
Wins the vacant Rajadamnern Stadium Bantamweight (118 lbs) title.
2025-06-28	Win	(Thailand) Kumandoi Petchyindee Academy	Rajadamnern World Series, Rajadamnern Stadium	Bangkok, Thailand	Decision (Unanimous)	5	3:00
2025-05-15	Win	(Thailand) Petchdet Wor.Sangprapai	Petchyindee, Rajadamnern Stadium	Bangkok, Thailand	KO (Elbow)	3	2:20
Defends the PRYDE TV 118 lbs title.
2025-03-06	Win	(Thailand) Samsiblan TK Boxing	Pryde TV + Petchyindee, Rajadamnern Stadium	Bangkok, Thailand	Decision	5	3:00
Defends the PRYDE TV 118 lbs title.
2025-01-30	Win	(Thailand) Chaitone Wor.Auracha	Pryde TV + Petchyindee, Rajadamnern Stadium	Bangkok, Thailand	Decision	5	3:00
2024-12-26	Loss	(Thailand) Kumandoi Petchyindee Academy	Petchyindee, Rajadamnern Stadium	Bangkok, Thailand	Decision (Unanimous)	5	3:00
2024-12-03	Loss	(Thailand) Teerapong Kraisirapop	Muaymansananmuang, Rangsit Stadium	Pathum Thani, Thailand	Decision	5	3:00
2024-09-12	Loss	(Thailand) Pangtor Por.Lakboon	PRYDE TV + Petchyindee, Rajadamnern Stadium	Bangkok, Thailand	Decision	5	3:00
2024-08-15	Win	(Thailand) Petchsongsaeng PetchyindeeAcademy	Petchyindee TV X Pryde TV, Rajadamnern Stadium	Bangkok, Thailand	Decision	5	3:00
2024-03-17	Win	(Japan) Yugo Kato	RISE ELDORADO 2024	Tokyo, Japan	Decision (Unanimous)	3	3:00
2024-01-09	Win	(Thailand) Anuwat V.K.KhaoYai	Muaymansananmuang, Rangsit Stadium	Pathum Thani, Thailand	Decision	3	3:00
2023-12-16	Loss	(Japan) Kazuki Osaki	RISE World Series 2023 - Final Round	Tokyo, Japan	Ext.R Decision (Split)	4	3:00
2023-10-26	Win	(Thailand) Chaitone Wor.Auracha	Muay Thai Rakya	Chiang Mai, Thailand	TKO (Knees)	4	
2023-09-06	Win	(Thailand) Detchpet Wor.Sangprapai	Muay Thai Palangmai - CPF Muaymansananlok	Chiang Mai, Thailand	TKO (Knees)	4	
Wins the vacant True4U 118 lbs title.
2023-08-09	Win	(Thailand) Fahpratan Singarchawin	Petchyindee, Rajadamnern Stadium	Bangkok, Thailand	Decision	5	3:00
2023-06-06	Loss	(Thailand) Boonlong Petchyindee	Muaymansananmuang, Rangsit Stadium	Pathum Thani, Thailand	Decision	5	3:00
2023-05-05	Win	(Thailand) Sailuad FighterMuaythai	Muaymanwansuk, Rangsit Stadium	Pathum Thani, Thailand	Decision	5	3:00
2023-03-04	Win	(Thailand) Muanglao Kiattongyot	Muayded Sangwendued, Jitmuangnon Stadium	Nontaburi, Thailand	Decision	5	3:00
2023-01-31	Loss	(Thailand) Waewwaw Wor.Klinpathum	Muaymansananmuang, Rangsit Stadium	Pathum Thani, Thailand	Decision	5	3:00
2022-12-27	Loss	(Thailand) Yodkla Isantractor	Muaymansananmuang, Rangsit Stadium	Pathum Thani, Thailand	Decision	5	3:00
2022-11-29	Draw	(Thailand) Dokmaipa SorJor.Tongprachin	Muaymansananmuang, Rangsit Stadium	Pathum Thani, Thailand	Decision	5	3:00
2022-11-01	Win	(Thailand) Fourwin Sitjaroensap	Muaymanwansuk, Rangsit Stadium	Pathum Thani, Thailand	Decision	5	3:00
2022-09-20	Win	(Thailand) Phetmalai Phetjaroenwit	Muaymansananmuang, Rangsit Stadium	Pathum Thani, Thailand	Decision	5	3:00
2022-08-02	Loss	(Thailand) Fourwin Sitjaroensap	Muaymansananmuang, Rangsit Stadium	Pathum Thani, Thailand	TKO	3	
2022-06-17	Win	(Thailand) Phetwanon Dabreb	Muaymanwansuk, Rangsit Stadium	Pathum Thani, Thailand	KO	3	
2022-05-13	Win	(Thailand) Jomyutjew Sitjomyut	Muaymanwansuk, Rangsit Stadium	Pathum Thani, Thailand	Decision	5	3:00
2022-03-31	Win	(Thailand) Rottangisan Dabrunsarakam	Petchyindee, Rajadamnern Stadium	Bangkok, Thailand	Decision	5	3:00
2022-02-24	Win	(Thailand) Jomyut Annimuaythaigym	Petchyindee, Rajadamnern Stadium	Bangkok, Thailand	KO	5	
2022-01-20	Win	(Thailand) Grandprixnoi P.K.Saenchai	Petchyindee, Rangsit Stadium	Pathum Thani, Thailand	Decision	5	3:00
2021-12-09	Win	(Thailand) Phetbunsak Sor.Phetchamrat	Petchyindee, Rangsit Stadium	Pathum Thani, Thailand	Decision	5	3:00
Legend: Win Loss Draw/No contest Notes
