= Phetsomjit Jitmuangnon =

Thai Muay Thai fighter

- Born: Thailand
- Other names: Phetnarin Por.Pekko, Phetnarin Jitmuangnon
- Nationality: Thai
- Height: 164 cm (5 ft 5 in)
- Weight: 51 kg (112 lb; 8.0 st)
- Fighting out of: Bangkok, Thailand

Phetsomjit Jitmuangnon (Thai: เพชรสมจิตร จิตรเมืองนนท์) is a Thai Muay Thai fighter.

== Titles and accomplishments ==
- 2016 Channel 7 Stadium 108 lbs Champion
- 2019 Rajadamnern Stadium 112 lbs Champion

== Fight record ==
Muay Thai Record
Date	Result	Opponent	Event	Location	Method	Round	Time
2021-11-26	Loss	(Thailand) Kiriluang Chor.Hapayak	Muay Thai Moradok Kon Thai	Buriram, Thailand	Decision	5	3:00
2021-03-25	Win	(Thailand) Satanmuanglek PetchyindeeAcademy	Petchyindee, Rangsit Stadium	Rangsit, Thailand	Decision	5	3:00
2021-02-21	Draw	(Thailand) Oleylek Sor.Kianjai	Muaydeevitheethai, Blue Arena	Samut Prakan, Thailand	Decision	5	3:00
2020-11-05	Win	(Thailand) Chanalert Meenayothin	Muaymanwansuk, Rangsit Stadium	Rangsit, Thailand	Decision	5	3:00
2020-10-10	Win	(Thailand) Phetsuphan Por.Daorungruang	Jitmuangnon + Sor.KafeMuayThai, Or.Tor.Gor 3 Stadium	Nonthaburi, Thailand	Decision	5	3:00
2020-09-12	Win	(Thailand) Phetsuphan Por.Daorungruang	Yodmuay Onesongchai, Thanakorn Stadium	Nakhon Pathom, Thailand	Decision	5	3:00
2020-08-15	Loss	(Thailand) Chokpanlan Por.Lakboon	SuekJaoMuayThai, Siam Omnoi Stadium	Samut Sakhon, Thailand	Decision	5	3:00
2020-07-11	Win	(Thailand) Phetsommai Sor.Sommai	SuekJaoMuayThai, Siam Omnoi Stadium	Samut Sakhon, Thailand	Decision	5	3:00
2020-02-28	Loss	(Thailand) Phetsommai Sor.Sommai	Ruamponkonchon Pratan Super Fight	Pathum Thani, Thailand	Decision	5	3:00
2020-01-31	Win	(Thailand) Satanmuanglek PetchyindeeAcademy	Phuket Super Fight Real Muay Thai	Mueang Phuket District, Thailand	Decision	5	3:00
2019-12-19	Loss	(Thailand) Phetsuphan Por.Daorungruang	Rajadamnern Stadium	Bangkok, Thailand	Decision	5	3:00
For the Rajadamnern Stadium 115 lbs title.
2019-11-25	Win	(Thailand) Phetsommai Sor.Sommai	Rajadamnern Stadium	Bangkok, Thailand	Decision (Unanimous)	5	3:00
Wins the Rajadamnern Stadium 112 lbs title.
2019-10-12	Loss	(Thailand) Phetsommai Sor.Sommai	Omnoi Stadium	Bangkok, Thailand	Decision	5	3:00
For the vacant Omnoi Stadium 115 lbs title.
2019-09-10	Win	(Thailand) Satanmuanglek PetchyindeeAcademy	Lumpinee Stadium	Bangkok, Thailand	Decision	5	3:00
2019-08-09	Win	(Thailand) Satanmuanglek PetchyindeeAcademy	Lumpinee Stadium	Bangkok, Thailand	Decision	5	3:00
2019-06-23	Draw	(Thailand) Priewpak SorJor.Vichitmuangpadriew	Blue Arena	Samut Prakan, Thailand	Decision	5	3:00
2019-05-23	Loss	(Thailand) Mohawk Tded99	Rajadamnern Stadium	Bangkok, Thailand	Decision	5	3:00
2019-03-21	Loss	(Thailand) Satanmuanglek PetchyindeeAcademy	Rajadamnern Stadium	Bangkok, Thailand	Decision	5	3:00
2019-02-25	Win	(Thailand) Priewpak SorJor.Vichitmuangpadriew	Rajadamnern Stadium	Bangkok, Thailand	Decision	5	3:00
2019-02-01	Win	(Thailand) Chanalert Meenayothin	Rajadamnern Stadium	Bangkok, Thailand	Decision	5	3:00
2019-01-04	Win	(Thailand) Phetwanchai Wor.Sangprapai	Lumpinee Stadium	Bangkok, Thailand	Decision	5	3:00
2018-10-25	Win	(Thailand) Phetwanchai Wor.Sangprapai	Rajadamnern Stadium	Bangkok, Thailand	Decision	5	3:00
2018-10-04	Win	(Thailand) Ngaopayak OrBorTor.Nonthong	Rajadamnern Stadium	Bangkok, Thailand	Decision	5	3:00
2018-08-16	Win	(Thailand) Sarawut SorJor.Vichitpaedriw	Rajadamnern Stadium	Bangkok, Thailand	Decision	5	3:00
2018-07-12	Loss	(Thailand) Priewpak SorJor.Vichitmuangpadriew	Rajadamnern Stadium	Bangkok, Thailand	Decision	5	3:00
2018-06-02	Loss	(Thailand) Chokploengrit Por.Lakboon	Omnoi Stadium	Bangkok, Thailand	Decision	5	3:00
For the vacant Omnoi Stadium 115 lbs title.
2018-04-18	Draw	(Thailand) Priewpak SorJor.Vichitmuangpadriew	Rajadamnern Stadium	Bangkok, Thailand	Decision	5	3:00
2018-03-26	Loss	(Thailand) Priewpak SorJor.Vichitmuangpadriew	Rajadamnern Stadium	Bangkok, Thailand	Decision	5	3:00
2018-02-08	Win	(Thailand) Diesellek Wor.Wanchai	Rajadamnern Stadium	Bangkok, Thailand	Decision	5	3:00
2018-01-08	Win	(Thailand) Chopper Gor.Sapaothong	Rajadamnern Stadium	Bangkok, Thailand	Decision	5	3:00
2017-12-17	Win	(Thailand) Chokploengrit Por.Lakboon	Rangsit Stadium	Pathum Thani, Thailand	Decision	5	3:00
2017-11-06	Win	(Thailand) Yokthong Pinsinchai	Rajadamnern Stadium	Bangkok, Thailand	Decision	5	3:00
2017-09-20	Loss	(Thailand) Diesellek Wor.Wanchai	Rajadamnern Stadium	Bangkok, Thailand	Decision	5	3:00
2017-08-11	Win	(Thailand) Ngaopayak OrBorTor.Nonthong	Lumpinee Stadium	Bangkok, Thailand	Decision	5	3:00
2017-05-11	Win	(Thailand) Jaroenpon Popthirathum	Rajadamnern Stadium	Bangkok, Thailand	TKO	5	
2017-03-26	Win	(Thailand) Phetpanrit Phor.Lakboon	Channel 7 Stadium	Bangkok, Thailand	Decision	5	3:00
2016-12-16	Win	(Thailand) AkeMueangKhon Mor.KrungthepThonburi	Lumpinee Stadium	Bangkok, Thailand	Decision	5	3:00
2016-09-28	Win	(Thailand) Phetpanrit Phor.Lakboon	Rajadamnern Stadium	Bangkok, Thailand	Decision	5	3:00
2017-08-06	Loss	(Thailand) Koko Paeminburi	Channel 7 Stadium	Bangkok, Thailand	Decision	5	3:00
2016-07-10	Win	(Thailand) Pentor Thor.Phan49	Channel 7 Stadium	Bangkok, Thailand	Decision	5	3:00
Wins the vacant Channel 7 Stadium 108 lbs title.
2016-06-17	Loss	(Thailand) Pentor Thor.Phan49	Lumpinee Stadium	Bangkok, Thailand	Decision	5	3:00
2016-05-04	Win	(Thailand) Senthanong Tor.Silachai	Rajadamnern Stadium	Bangkok, Thailand	Decision	5	3:00
2016-04-05	Loss	(Thailand) Nengern Lukjaomaesaivari	Lumpinee Stadium	Bangkok, Thailand	Decision	5	3:00
2016-03-14	Win	(Thailand) Kaosanit Sor.Dechaphan	Rajadamnern Stadium	Bangkok, Thailand	Decision	5	3:00
2016-02-12	Loss	(Thailand) Koko Paeminburi	Lumpinee Stadium	Bangkok, Thailand	Decision	5	3:00
2016-02-03	Loss	(Thailand) Muangchonlek Phor.Suantong	Lumpinee Stadium	Bangkok, Thailand	KO	4	
2016-01-24	Win	(Thailand) Nuengpayak Phor.Jaroenpeth	Lumpinee Stadium	Bangkok, Thailand	KO	4	
2015-12-30	Loss	(Thailand) Munggonphet Sor.Kor.Sungaigym	Lumpinee Stadium	Bangkok, Thailand	Decision	5	3:00
2015-12-22	Loss	(Thailand) Peemai Erawan	Lumpinee Stadium	Bangkok, Thailand	Decision	5	3:00
2015-10-05	Win	(Thailand) Koko Paeminburi	Rajadamnern Stadium	Bangkok, Thailand	Decision	5	3:00
2015-12-22	Loss	(Thailand) Peemai Erawan	Lumpinee Stadium	Bangkok, Thailand	Decision	5	3:00
2015-10-05	Win	(Thailand) Koko Paeminburi	Rajadamnern Stadium	Bangkok, Thailand	Decision	5	3:00
2015-09-11	Win	(Thailand) Pomphet Sitnumnoi	Lumpinee Stadium	Bangkok, Thailand	Decision	5	3:00
2015-07-28	Loss	(Thailand) Phetkaowong Aesapansung	Lumpinee Stadium	Bangkok, Thailand	Decision	5	3:00
2015-04-03	Draw	(Thailand) Phetpanrit Phor.Lakboon	Lumpinee Stadium	Bangkok, Thailand	Decision	5	3:00
2015-02-16	Loss	(Thailand) Yodbuadaeng SirilakMuaythai	Rajadamnern Stadium	Bangkok, Thailand	Decision	5	3:00
2015-01-09	Win	(Thailand) Singhaudorn Audaudorn	Lumpinee Stadium	Bangkok, Thailand	Decision	5	3:00
2014-12-15	Win	(Thailand) Werachat Boonrasi	Rajadamnern Stadium	Bangkok, Thailand	Decision	5	3:00
2014-10-31	Win	(Thailand) Phetpadriew Sor.Jor.Vichitpadrew	Lumpinee Stadium	Bangkok, Thailand	Decision	5	3:00
2014-09-30	Loss	(Thailand) Yodbuadaeng SirilakMuaythai	Lumpinee Stadium	Bangkok, Thailand	Decision	5	3:00
2014-09-09	Draw	(Thailand) Werachat Boonrasi	Lumpinee Stadium	Bangkok, Thailand	Decision	5	3:00
Legend: Win Loss Draw/No contest Notes
