= Vachirarattanawong =

Vachirarattanawong is a surname. People associated with the surname include:

- Virat Vachirarattanawong
- Nuttadaj Vachirarattanawong
