= Pangtor Por.Lakboon =

Thai Muay Thai fighter

- Born: Parinya Khamlum; May 21, 1998 (age 28); Lamphun, Thailand
- Other names: Pangtor Tor.Siriwat (ปังตอ ต.ศิริวัฒน์); Chokplerngrit P.K.Saenchaimuaythaigym (โชคเพลิงฤทธิ์ พี.เค.แสนชัย); Chokpanlan Por.Lakboon (โชคพันล้าน ภ.หลักบุญ); Chokploengrit
- Nickname: The Butcher
- Height: 167 cm (5 ft 6 in)
- Division: Flyweight; Super Flyweight; Bantamweight
- Style: Muay Thai (Muay Khao)
- Stance: Southpaw
- Fighting out of: Bangkok, Thailand
- Team: P.K.Saenchai Muaythai Gym

Parinya Khamlum (born May 21, 1998), known professionally as Pangtor Por.Lakboon (Thai: ปังตอ ภ.หลักบุญ) is a Thai Muay Thai fighter. He is a three-time Rajadamnern Stadium champion across two divisions and the current Rajadamnern Stadium Bantamweight Champion.

== Career ==
On February 18, 2018, Pangtor faced Phetsommai Sor.Sommai at Rangsit Stadium, he lost the fight by decision. They rematched six months later on August 8 with the vacant Rajadamnern Stadium 112 lbs at stake. He once again was defeated by decision.

On APril 25, 2019, Pangtor defeated Mohawk Tded99 by decision at the Rajadamnern Stadium for the Sor.Sommai promotion. The next month on May 31, 2019, Pangtor faced Den Sor.PhetUdon at the Lumpinee Stadium for the Muay Thai Pantamit promotion. He won the fight by decision.

On August 15, 2020, Pangor defeated Phetsomjit Jitmuangnon by decision at Omnoi Stadium.

On November 17, 2020, Pangtor took his revenge on Phetsommai Sor.Sommai who had previously defeated him twice. He won their third fight by decision in Nakhon Ratchasima province for the Sor.Sommai promotion.

On April 24, 2021, Pangtor challenged Jomhod Eminentair for his Channel 7 Stadium 115 lbs title. He won the fight by decision. Following this success Pangtor was ranked as the #1 muay thai fighter in the world in the 115 lbs division by the WMO and #3 by the WBC Muay Thai.

On November 11, 2021, Pangtor faced Petchsila Wor.Auracha with both fighters having won nine of their last ten fights. Petchsila won via fourth-round knockout with an elbow strike. They reamtched a month alter on December 24 with the vacant True4 115 lbs belt and a one million abht side-bet at stake. Petchsila won once again by decision.

On January 26, 2023, Pangtor faced top fighter Kumandoi PetchyindeeAcademy at Rajadamnern Stadium. He lost the bout by decision.

On March 23, 2023, Pangtor defeated Phetnamchok Sor.Jor.Tongprachin via third-round knockout with knees to take the vacant True4U 115 lbs title. After this victory Pangor was ranked #2 muay thai fighter in the world at 115 lbs by Combat Press.

On May 15, 2023, Pangtor faced JJ Or.Pimonsri for the vacant Rajadamnern Stadium 118 lbs title. He won the fight by decision.

== Titles and accomplishments ==
=== Muay Thai ===
- Siam Omnoi Stadium
  - 2018 Omnoi Stadium Super Flyweight (115 lbs) Champion
- Channel 7 Boxing Stadium
  - 2021 Channel 7 Stadium Super Flyweight (115 lbs) Champion
- Petchyindee True4U
  - 2023 True4U Super Flyweight (115 lbs) Champion
- Rajadamnern Stadium
  - 2023 Rajadamnern Stadium Bantamweight (118 lbs) Champion
  - 2025 Rajadamnern Stadium Super Flyweight (115 lbs) Champion
  - 2026 interim Rajadamnern Stadium Bantamweight (118 lbs) Champion
  - 2026 Rajadamnern Stadium Bantamweight (118 lbs) Champion

=== Amateur boxing ===
- 2024 Thailand National Championship Bantamweight (gold)

== Fight record ==
Muay Thai Record
Date	Result	Opponent	Event	Location	Method	Round	Time
2026-08-29	Win	(Thailand) Jaroensuk BoonlannaMuaythai	Rajadamnern World Series, Rajadamnern Stadium	Bangkok, Thailand	Decision (Unanimous)	5	3:00
Wins the Rajadamnern Stadium Bantamweight (118 lbs) title.
2026-07-04	Win	(Thailand) Saotho Or.Atchariya	Rajadamnern World Series	Bangkok, Thailand	KO (Body punches)	2	2:43
Wins the interim Rajadamnern Stadium Bantamweight (118 lbs) title.
2026-05-14	Win	(Thailand) Sadaothong Nuiseemoommuang	Petchyindee, Rajadamnern Stadium	Bangkok, Thailand	Decision	5	3:00
2026-03-10	Win	(Thailand) JJ Or.Pimonsri	Muaymansananmuang, M Arena	Phuket, Thailand	KO (Body punches)	2	2:59
2026-01-22	Win	(Thailand) Saotho Or.Atchariya	Petchyindee, Rajadamnern Stadium	Bangkok, Thailand	KO (Knee to the body)	3	
2025-11-22	Loss	(Thailand) Petchdet Muayded789	Rajadamnern World Series	Bangkok, Thailand	Decision (Majority)	5	3:00
Loses the Rajadamnern Stadium Super Flyweight (115 lbs) title.
2025-08-16	Win	(Thailand) Jomhod Sitluangpeenamfon	Rajadamnern World Series	Bangkok, Thailand	KO (Elbow)	4	1:00
Wins the vacant Rajadamnern Stadium Super Flyweight (115 lbs) title.
2025-07-05	Win	(Thailand) Malaithong Nuiseemoommuang	Rajadamnern World Series	Bangkok, Thailand	KO (Body punches)	2	2:09
2025-04-05	Loss	(Thailand) Petchdet Muayded789	Rajadamnern World Series	Bangkok, Thailand	Decision (Unanimous)	3	3:00
2025-02-20	Loss	(Thailand) Petchdet Muayded789	Petchyindee, Rajadamnern Stadium	Bangkok, Thailand	Decision	5	3:00
2024-10-10	Win	(Thailand) Petchdet Muayded789	Petchyindee, Rajadamnern Stadium	Bangkok, Thailand	Decision	5	3:00
2024-09-12	Win	(Thailand) Jaroensuk BoonlannaMuaythai	PRYDE TV + Petchyindee, Rajadamnern Stadium	Bangkok, Thailand	Decision	5	3:00
2024-08-15	Win	(Thailand) CaptainTeam AdsanPatong	PRYDE TV + Petchyindee, Rajadamnern Stadium	Bangkok, Thailand	Decision	5	3:00
2024-07-14	Win	(Japan) Issei Ishii	Rajadamnern World Series Japan	Chiba, Japan	Decision (Unanimous)	3	3:00
2024-05-23	Loss	(Thailand) Petchdet Muayded789	PRYDE TV + Petchyindee, Rajadamnern Stadium	Bangkok, Thailand	Decision	5	3:00
2024-04-04	Loss	(Thailand) Detchpet Petchyindee Academy	Petchyindee, Rajadamnern Stadium	Bangkok, Thailand	Decision	5	3:00
2024-01-20	Loss	(Thailand) Kumandoi PetchyindeeAcademy	Rajadamnern World Series	Bangkok, Thailand	Decision (Unanimous)	5	3:00
For the vacant Rajadamnern Stadium Bantamweight (118 lbs) title.
2023-10-28	Win	(Japan) Issei Ishii	Rajadamnern World Series	Bangkok, Thailand	Decision (Unanimous)	3	3:00
2023-08-09	Loss	(Thailand) Khunsueklek Boomdeksian	Rajadamnern Ruamjai Puan Faen Muay, Rajadamnern Stadium	Bangkok, Thailand	Decision	5	3:00
2023-07-08	Win	(Thailand) Kiewthong Nuiseemoommuang	Rajadamnern World Series	Bangkok, Thailand	Decision (Unanimous)	3	3:00
2023-05-18	Win	(Thailand) JJ Or.Pimonsri	Petchyindee, Rajadamnern Stadium	Bangkok, Thailand	Decision	5	3:00
Wins the vacant Rajadamnern Stadium Bantamweight (118 lbs) title.
2023-03-24	Win	(Thailand) Phetnamchok Sor.Jor.Tongprachin	Muaymanwansuk, Rangsit Stadium	Rangsit, Thailand	KO (Knee to the body)	3	
Wins the vacant True4U Super Flyweight (115 lbs) title.
2023-01-26	Loss	(Thailand) Kumandoi PetchyindeeAcademy	Petchyindee, Rajadamnern Stadium	Bangkok, Thailand	Decision	5	3:00
2022-12-18	Win	(Thailand) Chusab Sor.Salacheep	Kiatpetch, Rajadamnern Stadium	Bangkok, Thailand	Decision	5	3:00
2022-10-29	Win	(Thailand) Den Sor.PhetUdon	Lumpinee Muay Thai TKO, World Siam Stadium	Bangkok, Thailand	Decision	5	3:00
2022-09-24	Win	(Thailand) Pon Parunchai	Lumpinee Muay Thai TKO, Tawanna Bangkapi	Bangkok, Thailand	Decision	5	3:00
2022-08-20	Win	(Thailand) Mahasamut Moopingaroijunbei	Lumpinee Muay Thai TKO, Tawanna Bangkapi	Bangkok, Thailand	KO (Left straight)	4	
2022-05-29	Win	(Thailand) Chusab Sor.Salacheep	Kiatpetch, Rajadamnern Stadium	Bangkok, Thailand	Decision	5	3:00
2022-03-27	Loss	(Thailand) Phetsommai Sor.Sommai	Chang MuayThai Kiatpetch Amarin Super Fight, Rajadamnern Stadium	Bangkok, Thailand	Decision	5	3:00
2022-02-12	Loss	(Thailand) Yodsila Chor.Hapayak	Suek Jao Muay Thai, Omnoi Stadium	Samut Prakan, Thailand	Decision	5	3:00
2021-12-24	Loss	(Thailand) Petchsila Wor.Auracha	Petchyindee True4U Muaymanwansuk, Rangsit Stadium	Rangsit, Thailand	Decision	5	3:00
For the vacant True4U Super Flyweight (115 lbs) title and a 1 million baht side-bet.
2021-11-11	Loss	(Thailand) Petchsila Wor.Auracha	Petchyindee + Muay Thai Moradok Kon Thai	Buriram Province, Thailand	KO (left elbow)	4	
2021-04-24	Win	(Thailand) Jomhod Eminentair	Channel 7 Boxing Stadium	Bangkok, Thailand	Decision (Unanimous)	5	3:00
Wins Channel 7 Boxing Stadium Super Flyweight (115 lbs) title.
2021-03-17	Win	(Thailand) Phetsommai Sor.Sommai	Sor.Thanapon, Rajadamnern Stadium	Bangkok, Thailand	Decision	5	3:00
2020-12-18	Win	(Thailand) Aitthipon Singmawynn	Singmawynn	Thailand	Decision	5	3:00
2020-11-17	Win	(Thailand) Phetsommai Sor.Sommai	Sor.Sommai, CentralPlaza Nakhon Ratchasima	Nakhon Ratchasima, Thailand	Decision	5	3:00
2020-08-15	Win	(Thailand) Phetsomjit Jitmuangnon	SuekJaoMuayThai, Siam Omnoi Stadium	Samut Sakhon, Thailand	Decision	5	3:00
2020-03-12	Loss	(Thailand) Yodphot Nor.Anuwatgym	Sor.Sommai, Rajadamnern Stadium	Bangkok, Thailand	TKO (Doctor stop/cut)	4	
2019-12-23	Win	(Thailand) Den Sor.PhetUdon	Chef Boontham, Rajadamnern Stadium	Bangkok, Thailand	Decision	5	3:00
2019-05-31	Win	(Thailand) Den Sor.PhetUdon	Muay Thai Pantamit, Lumpinee Stadium	Bangkok, Thailand	Decision	5	3:00
2019-04-25	Win	(Thailand) Mohawk Tded99	Sor.Sommai, Rajadamnern Stadium	Bangkok, Thailand	Decision	5	3:00
2019-02-27	Win	(Thailand) DeeTee Sitjenkaew	Petchaopraya, Rajadamnern Stadium	Bangkok, Thailand	Decision	5	3:00
2018-12-11	Loss	(Thailand) Wanchainoi Sitsarawatseur	PKsaenchai, Lumpinee Stadium	Bangkok, Thailand	Decision	5	3:00
For a 1.5 million baht side-bet.
2018-11-12	Win	(Thailand) Priewpak SorJorVichitpaedriew	Sor.Sommai, Rajadamnern Stadium	Bangkok, Thailand	Decision	5	3:00
2018-09-18	Win	(Thailand) Mohawk Tded99	Muay Thai Pantamit, Lumpinee Stadium	Bangkok, Thailand	Decision	5	3:00
2018-08-08	Loss	(Thailand) Phetsommai Sor.Sommai	Rajadamnern Stadium	Bangkok, Thailand	TKO (Referee Stoppage)	4	
For the vacant Rajadamnern Stadium Flyweight (112 lbs) title.
2018-06-02	Win	(Thailand) Phetnarin Jitmuangnon	Omnoi Stadium	Bangkok, Thailand	Decision	5	3:00
Wins the vacant Omnoi Stadium Super Flyweight (115 lbs) title.
2018-04-04	Draw	(Thailand) Diesellek Wor.Wanchai	Tor.Chaiwat, Rajadamnern Stadium	Bangkok, Thailand	Decision	5	3:00
2018-02-18	Loss	(Thailand) Phetsommai Sor.Sommai	Rangsit Stadium	Pathum Thani, Thailand	Decision	5	3:00
For the Channel 5 Flyweight (112 lbs) title.
2017-12-17	Loss	(Thailand) Phetnarin Jitmuangnon	Rangsit Stadium	Pathum Thani, Thailand	Decision	5	3:00
2017-09-28	Win	(Thailand) Cherry Duangchaipon	Petchwittaya, Rajadamnern Stadium	Bangkok, Thailand	Decision	5	3:00
2017-09-04	Loss	(Thailand) Kochasit Thasaeyasat	Wanmeechai, Rajadamnern Stadium	Bangkok, Thailand	Decision	5	3:00
2017-08-03	Win	(Thailand) Offsite Sor.Wichitpaedriew	Jitmuangnon, Rajadamnern Stadium	Bangkok, Thailand	Decision	5	3:00
2017-06-01	Win	(Thailand) Pataksiam SinbiMuaythai	Tor.Chaiwat, Rajadamnern Stadium	Bangkok, Thailand	KO	4	
2017-02-27	Loss	(Thailand) Chaiyo PetchyindeeAcademy	Petchyindee, Rajadamnern Stadium	Bangkok, Thailand	Decision	5	3:00
2017-01-31	Win	(Thailand) Khonkon Kiatphonthip	Phetsuphan, Lumpinee Stadium	Bangkok, Thailand	Decision	5	3:00
2017-01-08	Win	(Thailand) Prakaitong Nitisamui Kiatphonthip	MuayDeeWithitai, Rangsit Stadium	Pathum Thani, Thailand	Decision	5	3:00
2016-12-18	Win	(Thailand) Phetmuang Nuisimumuang	MuayDeeWithitai, Rangsit Stadium	Pathum Thani, Thailand	Decision	5	3:00
2016-09-28	Win	(Thailand) Raktukhon Mor.RachabatUbon	Jitmuangnon, Rajadamnern Stadium	Pathum Thani, Thailand	Decision	5	3:00
2016-08-30	NC	(Thailand) Phetek Por.Chalad	Phetmuangnon, Lumpinee Stadium	Bangkok, Thailand	Ref.stop (Pangtor dismissed)	4	
2016-06-21	Loss	(Thailand) Phetek Por.Chalad	Phetkiatpetch, Lumpinee Stadium	Bangkok, Thailand	Decision	5	3:00
Legend: Win Loss Draw/No contest Notes
