= Kumandoi Petchyindee Academy =

Thai Muay Thai fighter

- Born: Namchai Dilokpraphuek; February 22, 1994 (age 32); Chiang Mai province, Thailand
- Other names: Kumandoi CP Freshmart; Kumandoi Sor.Jitpakdee (กุมารดอย ส.จิตรภักดี); Kumandoi Talingnam; Kumandoi Petcharoenvit (กุมารดอย เพชรเจริญวิทย์)
- Nickname: Fighter of Three Lands (นักชก 3 แผ่นดิน)
- Height: 164 cm (5 ft 5 in)
- Division: Flyweight; Super Flyweight; Bantamweight; Super Bantamweight
- Style: Muay Thai (Muay Mat)
- Stance: Orthodox
- Fighting out of: Bangkok, Thailand

Professional boxing record
- Total: 11
- Wins: 11
- By knockout: 5
- Losses: 0

Kickboxing record
- Total: 86
- Wins: 62
- Losses: 19
- By knockout: 4
- Draws: 5

Other information
- Boxing record from BoxRec

Namchai Dilokpraphuek (born February 22, 1994), known professionally as Kumandoi Petchyindee Academy (Thai: กุมารดอย เพชรยินดีอะคาเดมี), is a Thai professional Muay Thai fighter and boxer. He is a former Rajadamnern Stadium Super Flyweight Champion and Rajadamnern Stadium Bantamweight Champion.

As of October 2024, he is ranked #4 and #7 at Bantamweight according to the WMO and Combat Press respectively.

== Muay thai career ==
Kumandoi was booked to face Yothin FA Group for the vacant 118 lbs True4u Muaymumwansuek title at the Rangsit Stadium on December 23, 2016. He lost the fight by decision.

Kumandoi was scheduled to fight Petchrung Sor.Jor.Vichitpaedriw for the Blue Arena 118 lbs title at the Blue Arena on January 7, 2018. He lost the fight by decision.

Kumandoi challenged the reigning Rajadamnern Stadium 115 lbs champion Phetsuphan Por.Daorungruang on March 5, 2018. He lost the fight by decision.

Kumandoi captured his second professional title, the WBC Muay Thai World 122 lbs belt, on December 13, 2018, with a decision victory against Kumangoen Jitmuangnon.

During the year 2019 Kumandoi was undefeated at Rajadamnern Stadium in six fights. He was voted runner-up for the stadium Fighter of the Year award, losing it to Saotho Sitchefboontham.

Kumandoi made his kickboxing debut against Tenshin Nasukawa at Rizin 26 – Saitama on December 31, 2020. He lost the fight by unanimous decision.

Kumandoi was scheduled to face the Thailand Sports Authority Fighter of the Year runner-up Petchsila Wor.Auracha on March 10, 2022, at the Rajadamnern Stadium, for both the True4u and Rajadamnern Stadium 115 lbs titles. He won the fight by decision.

Kumandoi faced the former two-weight True4u champion Kaito Fukuda at Suk Wanchai MuayThai Super Fight on April 24, 2022 for the inaugural IMSA World Super Bantamweight title. He lost the fight by unanimous decision after being knocked down in the first round.

== Titles and accomplishments ==
=== Muay Thai ===
- Omnoi Stadium
  - 2014 Omnoi Stadium Flyweight (112 lbs) Champion
- World Boxing Council Muaythai
  - 2018 WBC Muay Thai World Super Bantamweight (122 lbs) Champion
- Rajadamnern Stadium
  - 2022 Rajadamnern Stadium Super Flyweight (115 lbs) Champion
  - 2024 Rajadamnern Stadium Bantamweight (118 lbs) Champion
- Petchyindee True4U
  - 2022 True4U Super Flyweight (115 lbs) Champion

=== Kickboxing ===
- RISE
  - 2023 RISE 54 kg World Series Tournament Runner-up

== Professional boxing record ==
12 fights	12 wins	0 losses
By knockout	6	0
By decision	6	0

No.	Result	Record	Opponent	Type	Round, time	Date	Location	Notes
12	Win	12–0	Chenghao Luo	UD	10	5 Aug 2026	Chonburi Provincial Ground, Chonburi, Thailand	Retained WBC Asia Super Flyweight title
11	Win	11–0	Akira Hoshuyama	TKO	5 (10)	6 May 2026	Chonburi Provincial Ground, Chonburi, Thailand	Retained WBC Asia Super Flyweight title
10	Win	10–0	Ruben Dadivas	UD	10	1 Apr 2026	Rangsit International Stadium, Rangsit, Thailand	Won WBC Asia Super Flyweight title
9	Win	9–0	Akbar Moradi	TKO	4 (6)	25 Feb 2026	Rangsit International Stadium, Rangsit, Thailand	
8	Win	8–0	Assada Rakmit	TKO	2	28 Jan 2026	Rangsit International Stadium, Rangsit, Thailand	
7	Win	7–0	Reymark Alicaba	UD	10	29 Oct 2025	Nakhon Sawan Municipality Ground, Nakhon Sawan, Thailand	Won WBC Asia Continental Super Flyweight title
6	Win	6–0	Edward Heno	TKO	5	24 Sep 2025	Rangsit International Stadium, Rangsit, Thailand	Retains ABF bantamweight title
5	Win	5–0	Reymark Alicaba	UD	10	27 Aug 2025	Rangsit International Stadium, Rangsit, Thailand	Won vacant ABF bantamweight title
4	Win	4–0	Mehran Sadiqi	TKO	5 (10)	25 Oct 2023	Rangsit International Stadium, Rangsit, Thailand	Won vacant ABF super-flyweight title
3	Win	3–0	Josiah Lumunya	UD	10	21 Dec 2022	Rangsit International Stadium, Rangsit, Thailand	Won vacant ABF super-bantamweight title
2	Win	2–0	Phutthichai Katikachoksakun	UD	6	24 May 2022	Rangsit International Stadium, Rangsit, Thailand	
1	Win	1–0	Liempetch Sithkhruake Gym	TKO	5 (6)	14 Dec 2021	Saphan Hin, Phuket, Thailand	

== Muay Thai and Kickboxing record ==
Muay Thai Record
Date	Result	Opponent	Event	Location	Method	Round	Time
2026-11-12	Loss	(Thailand) Phusing Klongsuanpluresort	Petchyindee, Rajadamnern Stadium	Bangkok, Thailand	Decision	5	3:00
For the vacant PRYDE TV Bantamweight (118 lbs) title.
2026-10-08	Win	(Thailand) Malaithong Nuisimummueng	Petchyindee, Rajadamnern Stadium	Bangkok, Thailand	KO (right hook)	2	
2026-09-10	Loss	(Thailand) Malaithong Nuisimummueng	Petchyindee, Rajadamnern Stadium	Bangkok, Thailand	Decision	5	3:00
2025-06-28	Loss	(Thailand) Jaroensuk BoonlannaMuaythai	Rajadamnern World Series	Bangkok, Thailand	Decision (Unanimous)	5	3:00
2025-03-29	Loss	(Japan) Ryujin Nasukawa	RISE ELDORADO 2025	Tokyo, Japan	TKO (3 Knockdowns)	2	2:39
2025-02-11	Win	(Thailand) Teerapong DabthitBangRak	Petchyindee, Watwangnamyen	Mahasarakham, Thailand	KO (Spinning backfist)	1	
2024-12-26	Win	(Thailand) Jaroensuk SorJor.TongPrachin	Suek CPF Muaymansananlok + Petchyindee, Rajadamnern Stadium	Bangkok, Thailand	Decision (Unanimous)	5	3:00
2024-11-23	Win	(Thailand) Jomhod Sitluangpeenamfon	Rajdamnern World Series, Rajadamnern Stadium	Bangkok, Thailand	Decision (Unanimous)	3	3:00
2024-10-10	Win	(Thailand) Waewwaw Wor.Klinpathum	Petchyindee, Rajadamnern Stadium	Bangkok, Thailand	Decision	5	3:00
2024-08-23	Loss	(Thailand) Petchsila Wor.Auracha	Konkraeng Muay Thai Muang Chakangraw + Muaymanwansuk, Kamphaengphet Stadium	Kamphaeng Phet province, Thailand	Decision	5	3:00
2024-07-04	Loss	(Thailand) Wanchainoi Sitsarawatseur	Petchyindee + Kiatpetch, Rajadamnern Stadium	Bangkok, Thailand	Decision	5	3:00
2024-04-06	Loss	(Thailand) Khunsueklek Boomdeksian	Rajadamnern World Series	Bangkok, Thailand	Decision (Unanimous)	5	3:00
Loses the Rajadamnern Stadium Bantamweight (118 lbs) title.
2024-01-20	Win	(Thailand) Pangtor Por.Lakboon	Rajadamnern World Series	Bangkok, Thailand	Decision (Unanimous)	5	3:00
Wins the vacant Rajadamnern Stadium Bantamweight (118 lbs) title.
2023-12-16	Loss	(Japan) Toki Tamaru	RISE World Series 2023 - Final Round	Tokyo, Japan	Decision (Unanimous)	3	3:00
For the 2023 RISE -54kg World Series title.
2023-08-26	Win	(Japan) Shiro	RISE World Series 2023 - 2nd Round	Tokyo, Japan	Decision (Unanimous)	3	3:00
2023-07-02	Win	(Belgium) Mohamed Kloua	RISE World Series 2023 - 1st Round	Osaka, Japan	Decision (Unanimous)	3	3:00
2023-05-12	Win	(Thailand) Oleylek Sor.Kaenjai	Muay Thai Lumpinee Pitaktam	Songkhla province, Thailand	Decision	5	3:00
2023-04-11	Win	(Thailand) Paeyim Sor.Boonmeerit	Muaymansananmuang Mahasarakham	Maha Sarakham province, Thailand	KO (Left hook)	3	2:00
2023-02-21	Win	(Thailand) Saotho Or.Atchariya	Muaymansananmuang	Bangkok, Thailand	Decision	5	3:00
2023-01-26	Win	(Thailand) Pangtor Por.Lakboon	Petchyindee, Rajadamnern Stadium	Bangkok, Thailand	Decision	5	3:00
2022-11-12	Win	(Thailand) PetchAnuwat Nor.AnuwatGym	Muay Thai Vithee Tin Thai + Petchyindee Sanjorn	Chiang Rai province, Thailand	Decision	5	3:00
2022-10-22	Win	(Thailand) Phetsommai Sor.Sommai	Ruamponkon Meepuen	Samut Sakhon province, Thailand	KO (Left Hook)	1	
2022-09-08	Loss	(Thailand) Petchsila Wor.Auracha	Petchyindee, Rajadamnern Stadium	Bangkok, Thailand	Decision (Unanimous)	5	3:00
For the vacant WMO Super Bantamweight (122 lbs) World title.
2022-07-05	Loss	(Thailand) Saoek Or.Atchariya	Muaymansananmuang, Rangsit Stadium	Bangkok, Thailand	Decision (Majority)	5	3:00
For the True4U Bantamweight (118 lbs) title.
2022-04-24	Loss	(Japan) Kaito Wor.Wanchai	Suk Wanchai MuayThai Super Fight	Nagoya, Japan	Decision (Unanimous)	5	3:00
For the inaugural IMSA World Super Bantamweight (122 lbs) title.
2022-03-10	Win	(Thailand) Petchsila Wor.Auracha	Petchyindee, Rajadamnern Stadium	Bangkok, Thailand	Decision	5	3:00
Wins the True4U and vacant Rajadamnern Stadium Super Flyweight (115 lbs) titles.
2022-01-21	Win	(Thailand) Puenkon Tor.Surat	Petchyindee, Rangsit Stadium	Rangsit, Thailand	Decision	5	3:00
2021-11-05	Loss	(Thailand) Saoek Or.Atchariya	Muaymanwansuk	Buriram Province, Thailand	Decision	5	3:00
2021-10-14	Win	(Thailand) Diesellek PetchyindeeAcadmy	Petchyindee + Muay Thai Moradok Kon Thai	Buriram Province, Thailand	Decision	5	3:00
2021-04-09	Win	(Thailand) Petchtawee Sor.Pongamon	Suk Pitaktam, Lumpinee Stadium	Bangkok, Thailand	Decision	5	3:00
2021-03-15	Draw	(Thailand) Saoek Sitchefboontham	Chef Boontham, Rangsit Stadium	Rangsit, Thailand	Decision	5	3:00
2020-12-31	Loss	(Japan) Tenshin Nasukawa	Rizin 26 – Saitama	Saitama, Japan	Decision (Unanimous)	3	3:00
2020-11-07	Loss	(Thailand) Saoek Sitchefboontham	SAT HERO SERIES, World Siam Stadium	Bangkok, Thailand	TKO (Doctor Stoppage)	4	
2020-10-08	Win	(Thailand) Petchsuntri Jitmuangnon	Jitmuangnon, Rajadamnern Stadium	Bangkok, Thailand	Decision	5	3:00
2020-09-01	Loss	(Thailand) Saoek Sitchefboontham	Chef Boontham, Thanakorn Stadium	Nakhon Pathom Province, Thailand	Decision	5	3:00
2020-08-04	Win	(Thailand) Saotho Sitchefboontham	Chef Boontham, Thanakorn Stadium	Nakhon Pathom Province, Thailand	Decision	5	3:00
2020-03-12	Win	(Thailand) Saotho Sitchefboontham	Sor.Sommai, Rajadamnern Stadium	Bangkok, Thailand	Decision	5	3:00
2019-12-12	Win	(Thailand) Puenkon Tor.Surat	Onesongchai, Rajadamnern Stadium	Bangkok, Thailand	Decision	5	3:00
2019-10-14	Win	(Thailand) Diesellek Petchyindee Academy	Wanmeechai, Rajadamnern Stadium	Bangkok, Thailand	Decision	5	3:00
2019-08-29	Win	(Thailand) Puenkon Tor.Surat	Onesongchai, Rajadamnern Stadium	Bangkok, Thailand	Decision	5	3:00
2019-07-22	Win	(Thailand) Hercules Phetsimean	Petchwittaya, Rajadamnern Stadium	Bangkok, Thailand	Decision	5	3:00
2019-06-06	Win	(Thailand) Phetsuphan Por.Daorungruang	Onesongchai, Rajadamnern Stadium	Bangkok, Thailand	KO (Head Kick)	2	
2019-03-31	Win	(Thailand) Pornpitak SorTor.Tanomsribangpu	Muay Dee Vithithai, Blue Arena	Samut Prakan, Thailand	KO	4	
2019-02-28	Win	(Thailand) Kongmuangtrang Kaewsamrit	Onesongchai, Rajadamnern Stadium	Bangkok, Thailand	Decision	5	3:00
2019-01-24	Loss	(Thailand) Puenkon Tor.Surat	Onesongchai, Rajadamnern Stadium	Bangkok, Thailand	Decision	5	3:00
2018-12-13	Win	(Thailand) Kumangoen Jitmuangnon	Jitmuangnon, Rajadamnern Stadium	Bangkok, Thailand	Decision (Unanimous)	5	3:00
Wins the vacant WBC Muay Thai World Super Bantamweight (122 lbs) title.
2018-11-21	Win	(Thailand) Konkhon Kiatphontip	Onesongchai, Rajadamnern Stadium	Bangkok, Thailand	KO	4	
2018-09-24	Loss	(Thailand) Sanpetch Sor.Salacheep	Onesongchai, Rajadamnern Stadium	Bangkok, Thailand	Decision	5	3:00
2018-08-22	Draw	(Thailand) Sanpetch Sor.Salacheep	Onesongchai, Rajadamnern Stadium	Bangkok, Thailand	Decision	5	3:00
2018-07-26	Win	(Thailand) Roichuerng Singmawin	Onesongchai, Rajadamnern Stadium	Bangkok, Thailand	Decision	5	3:00
2018-06-06	Loss	(Thailand) Phetsuphan Por.Daorungruang	Onesongchai, Rajadamnern Stadium	Bangkok, Thailand	Decision	5	3:00
2018-04-02	Win	(Thailand) Phetsuphan Por.Daorungruang	Onesongchai, Rajadamnern Stadium	Bangkok, Thailand	Decision	5	3:00
2018-03-05	Loss	(Thailand) Phetsuphan Por.Daorungruang	Onesongchai, Rajadamnern Stadium	Bangkok, Thailand	Decision	5	3:00
For the Rajadamnern Stadium Super Flyweight (115 lbs) title.
2018-02-01	Win	(Thailand) Kwandom Petchseemuen	Onesongchai, Rajadamnern Stadium	Bangkok, Thailand	Decision	5	3:00
2018-01-07	Loss	(Thailand) Petchrung Sor.Jor.Vichitpaedriw	Muay Dee Vithithai, Blue Arena	Samut Prakan, Thailand	Decision	5	3:00
For the Blue Arena Bantamweight (118 lbs) title.
2017-12-15	Win	(Thailand) Chaimongkhol Por.Aowtalaybangsaray	Lumpinee Stadium	Bangkok, Thailand	Decision	5	3:00
2017-11-02	Loss	(Thailand) Kompatak SinbiMuayThai	Onesongchai, Rajadamnern Stadium	Bangkok, Thailand	KO (High kick)	3	
2017-07-13	Loss	(Thailand) Puenkon Tor.Surat	Onesongchai, Rajadamnern Stadium	Bangkok, Thailand	KO	3	
2017-06-07	Win	(Thailand) Gingsanglek Tor.Laksong	Onesongchai, Rajadamnern Stadium	Bangkok, Thailand	Decision	5	3:00
2017-05-03	Loss	(Thailand) Puenkon Tor.Surat	Petchwittaya, Rajadamnern Stadium	Bangkok, Thailand	Decision	5	3:00
2017-03-30	Win	(Thailand) Phetchatchai Showraiaoi	Rajadamnern Stadium	Bangkok, Thailand	Decision	5	3:00
2017-02-08	Loss	(Thailand) Phetchatchai Showraiaoi	Rajadamnern Stadium	Bangkok, Thailand	Decision	5	3:00
2017-01-15	Loss	(Thailand) Ronachai Tor.Ramintra	Rangsit Stadium	Rangsit, Thailand	Decision	5	3:00
2016-12-23	Loss	(Thailand) Yothin FA Group	Rangsit Stadium	Rangsit, Thailand	Decision	5	3:00
For the 118 lbs True4u Muaymumwansuek title.
2016-11-30	Loss	(Thailand) Puenkon Tor.Surat	Rajadamnern Stadium	Bangkok, Thailand	Decision	5	3:00
2016-09-23	Win	(Thailand) Methee Sor.Jor.Toipadriew		Thailand	Decision	5	3:00
2016-08-30	Draw	(Thailand) Sprinter Pangkongpap	Lumpinee Stadium	Bangkok, Thailand	Decision	5	3:00
2016-08-05	Win	(Thailand) Thanuphet WitsanuKonLaKan	Lumpinee Stadium	Bangkok, Thailand	Decision	5	3:00
2016-07-08	Win	(Thailand) Fahmai Sor.Sommai	Lumpinee Stadium	Bangkok, Thailand	Decision	5	3:00
2016-05-26	Loss	(Thailand) Pichitchai P.K.Saenchai	Rajadamnern Stadium	Bangkok, Thailand	Decision	5	3:00
2016-04-06	Win	(Thailand) Kengkla Por.Pekko	Rajadamnern Stadium	Bangkok, Thailand	Decision	5	3:00
2016-03-16	Win	(Thailand) Morakot Phetsimuen	Rajadamnern Stadium	Bangkok, Thailand	KO (Punches)	5	
2016-02-24	Win	(Thailand) Phetchatchai Showraiaoi		Bangkok, Thailand	Decision	5	3:00
2015-11-21	Win	(Thailand) Sangdow Petchsimuen	Omnoi Stadium	Bangkok, Thailand	Decision	5	3:00
2015-10-26	Win	(Thailand) Fahmongkol Tembangsai	Rajadamnern Stadium	Bangkok, Thailand	KO	3	
2015-10-03	Win	(Thailand) Phetchatchai Showraiaoi	Montri Studio	Bangkok, Thailand	Decision	5	3:00
2015-08-10	Loss	(Thailand) Sangdow Petchsimuen	Rajadamnern Stadium	Bangkok, Thailand	Decision	5	3:00
2015-07-12	Win	(Thailand) Rungubon Maa Daeng	Rajadamnern Stadium	Bangkok, Thailand	Decision	5	3:00
2015-06-04	Loss	(Thailand) Pichitchai PK. Saenchaimuaythai	Rajadamnern Stadium	Bangkok, Thailand	KO (Left hook)	2	
2015-03-20	Win	(Thailand) Nichao Suvitgym	Lumpinee Stadium	Bangkok, Thailand	KO	5	
2015-01-19	Win	(Thailand) Oley Tor.Laksong	Rajadamnern Stadium	Bangkok, Thailand	Decision	5	3:00
2014-12-01	Loss	(Thailand) Chaimongkol Banmikiew	Rajadamnern Stadium	Bangkok, Thailand	Decision	5	3:00
2014-10-23	Win	(Thailand) Mongkolchai Sujeebameekiaw	Rajadamnern Stadium	Bangkok, Thailand	Decision	5	3:00
2014-09-04	Win	(Thailand) Yodman Huarongnakaeng	Rajadamnern Stadium	Bangkok, Thailand	KO	3	
2014-08-14	Loss	(Thailand) Phetmuangchon Por.Suantong	Rajadamnern Stadium	Bangkok, Thailand	Decision	5	3:00
For the Rajadamnern Stadium Light Flyweight (108 lbs) title.
2014-06-07	Win	(Thailand) Oley Sitniwat	Omnoi Stadium	Samut Sakhon, Thailand	Decision	5	3:00
Wins the vacant Omnoi Stadium Flyweight (112 lbs) title.
2014-04-10	Win	(Thailand) Thanayke Lukkhaokwang	Rajadamnern Stadium	Bangkok, Thailand	Decision	5	3:00
2013-12-10	Win	(Thailand) Nadet Sitphuphantu	Lumpinee Stadium	Bangkok, Thailand	Decision	5	3:00
2013-08-10	Loss	(Thailand) Boekban Lukmuangphet	Omnoi Stadium	Samut Sakhon, Thailand	Decision	5	3:00
2013-06-03	Loss	(Thailand) Phetmuangchon Por.Suantong	Rajadamnern Stadium	Bangkok, Thailand	Decision	5	3:00
2013-05-02	Loss	(Thailand) Pichitchai Or.Bor.Tor.Kampee	Rajadamnern Stadium	Bangkok, Thailand	Decision	5	3:00
2013-02-21	Loss	(Thailand) Sanchai Tor.Laksong	Rajadamnern Stadium	Bangkok, Thailand	Decision	5	3:00
For the Rajadamnern Stadium Mini Flyweight (105 lbs) title.
2012-12-17	Win	(Thailand) Phichitchai Or.Bor.Tor.Kampi	Onesongchai, Rajadamnern Stadium	Bangkok, Thailand	Decision	5	3:00
2012-10-29	Win	(Thailand) Numthesaban T.S.N.Motor	Onesongchai, Rajadamnern Stadium	Bangkok, Thailand	Decision	5	3:00
2012-09-17	Win	(Thailand) Acharsuek Dechchawalit	Onesongchai, Rajadamnern Stadium	Bangkok, Thailand	KO	4	
2012-08-20	Win	(Thailand) Oley Sitniwat	Onesongchai, Rajadamnern Stadium	Bangkok, Thailand	Decision	5	3:00
2012-07-19	Win	(Thailand) Oley Sitniwat	Onesongchai, Rajadamnern Stadium	Bangkok, Thailand	Decision	5	3:00
Legend: Win Loss Draw/No contest Notes
