= Petchdet Wor.Sangprapai =

Thai Muay Thai fighter (born 2001)

Petchdet
- Born: Wongsaphat Khunpradit; May 20, 2001 (age 25); Surat Thani province, Thailand
- Other names: Phetdet PetchyindeeAcademy (เพชรเดช เพชรยินดีอะคาเดมี่); Petchdej Muayded789 (เพชรเดช มวยเด็ด789); Petchdet Sakwichian (เพชรเดช ศักดิ์วิเชียร); Petchdech FighterMuayThai (เพชรเดช ไฟเตอร์มวยไทย)
- Height: 164 cm (5 ft 5 in)
- Weight: 53 kg (117 lb; 8.3 st)
- Stance: Orthodox
- Fighting out of: Bangkok, Thailand
- Team: Petchyindee Academy

Other information
- Notable relatives: Detchpet Wor.Sangprapai (twin brother)

Wongsaphat Khunpradit (Thai: วงศพัทธ์ ขุนประดิษฐ์) known professionally as Petchdet Wor.Sangprapai (Thai: เพชรเดช ว.สังข์ประไพ) is a Thai Muay Thai fighter.

== Career ==
On August 29, 2018, Petchdet travelled to Japan to face Ryuya Okuwaki at Suk Wan Kingthong "Go to Raja". He won the fight by unanimous decision.

On June 1, 2019, Petchdet rematched Ryuya Okuwaki for the vacant WBC Muay Thai World 105 lbs title. He won the fight by unanimous decision.

Petchdet was scheduled to face Petchsila Wor.Auracha on January 24, 2020, at the Lumpinee Stadium for the Petchpiya promotion. He lost the fight by decision.

On February 28, 2020 Petchdet faced Nonghanlek MTM Academy at the Rangsit Stadium for Muaymanwansuk and Petchpiya co promotion event. He won the fight by decision.

Petchdet was scheduled to defend his True4U Flyweight title against Nuathoranee Jitmuangnon on August 9, 2022, at the Rangsit Stadium for the Muaymansananmuang promotion. He won the fight by technical knockout in the fourth round.

As of May 2025, Petchdet was ranked the #2 Nak Muay in the world in the 112lbs division by the WMO.

On September 29, 2022, Petchdet faced Paeyim Sor.Boonmerit as a defense of his Rajadamnern Stadium Flyweight (112 lbs) title on a Petchyindee promoted event. He lost the fight by split decision.

On November 17, 2023, Petchdet faced Captainteam Adsanpatong at Rangsit Stadium for the Muaymanwansuk promotion. He won the fight by decision.

Petchdet faced Pangtor Por.Lakboon for the fourth time on April 5, 2025, at Rajadamnern World Series. he won the fight by uanimous decision after scoring a knockdown with punches.

== Titles and accomplishments ==
- Rajadamnern Stadium
  - 2022 Rajadamnern Stadium Flyweight (112 lbs) Champion
  - 2023 Rajadamnern Stadium Super Flyweight (115 lbs) Champion
  - 2025 Rajadamnern Stadium Super Flyweight (115 lbs) Champion
    - Three successful title defenses
- True4U Petchyindee
  - 2022 True4U Flyweight (112 lbs) Champion
    - Two successful title defenses
- World Boxing Council Muay Thai
  - 2019 WBC Muay Thai World Minimumweight (105 lbs) Champion

== Fight record ==
Muay Thai record
| Date | Result | Opponent | Event | Location | Method | Round | Time |
|---|---|---|---|---|---|---|---|
| 2026-11-28 | | (France) Nahyan Mohammed | Rajadamnern World Series | Bangkok, Thailand | | | |
Defending the Rajadamnern Stadium Super Flyweight (115 lbs) title.
| 2026-10-10 | Draw | Jigsaw SitThailand | Rajadamnern World Series - Knocktober Fest | Bangkok, Thailand | Decision (majority) | 5 | 3:00 |
Defends the Rajadamnern Stadium Super Flyweight (115 lbs) title.
| 2026-08-01 | Win | (Thailand) Phettechin BangsaenFightClub | Rajadamnern World Series, Rajadamnern Stadium | Bangkok, Thailand | KO (Left hook to the body) | 1 | 2:53 |
Defends the Rajadamnern Stadium Super Flyweight (115 lbs) title.
| 2026-06-06 | Win | (Iran) Amirhossein Zolfi | Rajadamnern World Series, Rajadamnern Stadium | Bangkok, Thailand | TKO (Knees to the body) | 2 | 1:22 |
| 2026-01-17 | Win | (Thailand) Fourwin Sitjaroensap | Rajadamnern World Series, Rajadamnern Stadium | Bangkok, Thailand | KO (Knees) | 3 | 2:55 |
Defends the Rajadamnern Stadium Super Flyweight (115 lbs) title.
| 2025-11-22 | Win | (Thailand) Pangtor Por.Lakboon | Rajadamnern World Series | Bangkok, Thailand | Decision (Majority) | 5 | 3:00 |
Wins the Rajadamnern Stadium Super Flyweight (115 lbs) title.
| 2025-08-23 | Win | (Thailand) Phusingha KlongsuanpluResort | Rajadamnern World Series | Bangkok, Thailand | Decision (Unanimous) | 3 | 3:00 |
| 2025-05-15 | Loss | (Thailand) Jaroensuk PathongGym | Petchyindee, Rajadamnern Stadium | Bangkok, Thailand | KO (Elbow) | 3 | 2:20 |
For the PRYDE TV 118 lbs title.
| 2025-04-05 | Win | (Thailand) Pangtor Por.Lakboon | Rajadamnern World Series | Bangkok, Thailand | Decision (Unanimous) | 3 | 3:00 |
| 2025-02-20 | Win | (Thailand) Pangtor Por.Lakboon | PRYDE TV + Petchyindee, Rajadamnern Stadium | Bangkok, Thailand | Decision | 5 | 3:00 |
| 2024-12-12 | Win | (Thailand) Captainteam Adsanpatong | Petchyindee, Rajadamnern Stadium | Bangkok, Thailand | Decision | 5 | 3:00 |
| 2024-10-10 | Loss | (Thailand) Pangtor Por.Lakboon | Petchyindee, Rajadamnern Stadium | Bangkok, Thailand | Decision | 5 | 3:00 |
| 2024-08-29 | Win | (Thailand) Songpayak J.P.Power | Petchyindee, Rajadamnern Stadium | Bangkok, Thailand | Decision | 5 | 3:00 |
| 2024-07-04 | Loss | (Thailand) Yokkiri T.N.Muaythai | PRYDE TV + Petchyindee, Rajadamnern Stadium | Bangkok, Thailand | Decision | 5 | 3:00 |
| 2024-05-23 | Win | (Thailand) Pangtor Por.Lakboon | PRYDE TV + Petchyindee, Rajadamnern Stadium | Bangkok, Thailand | Decision | 5 | 3:00 |
| 2024-04-04 | Win | (Thailand) JJ Or.Pimonsri | Petchyindee, Rajadamnern Stadium | Bangkok, Thailand | KO | 3 | |
| 2023-12-29 | Win | (Thailand) Teeyai Tded99 | Muay Thai Motherland + Muaymanwansuk | Songkhla, Thailand | Decision | 5 | 3:00 |
| 2023-11-17 | Win | (Thailand) Captainteam Adsanpatong | Muaymanwansuk, Rangsit Stadium | Pathum Thani, Thailand | Decision | 5 | 3:00 |
| 2023-08-10 | Win | (Thailand) Phetnanuwat Nor.AnuwatGym | Petchyindee, Rajadamnern Stadium | Bangkok, Thailand | Decision | 5 | 3:00 |
| 2023-04-06 | Loss | (Thailand) JJ Or.Pimonsri | Petchyindee, Rajadamnern Stadium | Bangkok, Thailand | KO (Left body kick) | 1 | |
| 2023-01-05 | Win | (Thailand) Phetnanuwat Nor.AnuwatGym | Petchyindee, Rajadamnern Stadium | Bangkok, Thailand | Decision (Unanimous) | 5 | 3:00 |
Wins the vacant Rajadamnern Stadium Super Flyweight (115 lbs) title.
| 2022-11-18 | Win | (Thailand) Petchnumchai SorJor.Tongprachin | Muaymanwansuk, Rajadamnern Stadium | Bangkok, Thailand | Decision | 5 | 3:00 |
| 2022-09-29 | Loss | (Thailand) Paeyim Sor.Boonmerit | Petchyindee, Rajadamnern Stadium | Bangkok, Thailand | Decision (Split) | 5 | 3:00 |
Loses the Rajadamnern Stadium Flyweight (112 lbs) title.
| 2022-08-09 | Win | (Thailand) Nuathoranee Jitmuangnon | Muaymansananmuang, Rangsit Stadium | Pathum Thani, Thailand | TKO (Referee stoppage) | 4 | |
Defends the True4U Flyweight (112 lbs) title.
| 2022-06-02 | Win | (Thailand) Singpetch Dejsingtai | Petchyindee, Rajadamnern Stadium | Bangkok, Thailand | Decision | 5 | 3:00 |
Defends the True4U Flyweight (112 lbs) title.
| 2022-03-24 | Win | (Thailand) Dinnuathong Muadpong191 | Petchyindee, Rajadamnern Stadium | Bangkok, Thailand | Decision | 5 | 3:00 |
Wins the vacant True4U and Rajadamnern Stadium Flyweight (112 lbs) titles.
| 2022-02-03 | Win | (Thailand) Petchchaisang Petchcharoenwit | Petchyindee, Rangsit Stadium | Pathum Thani, Thailand | Decision | 5 | 3:00 |
| 2021-12-16 | Win | (Thailand) Kritsanachai Rongsamak | Petchyindee, Rajadamnern Stadium | Bangkok, Thailand | Decision | 5 | 3:00 |
| 2021-10-21 | Loss | (Thailand) Sirichai Mor RajabhatMuban | Petchyindee, Rajadamnern Stadium | Bangkok, Thailand | KO (Knees) | 3 | |
| 2021-04-02 | Win | (Thailand) Petchsarit Korsukhothai | Muaymanwansuk, Rajadamnern Stadium | Bangkok, Thailand | KO | 3 | |
| 2021-03-11 | Win | (Thailand) Malaingoen SomwangGaiyang | Petchyindee, Rajadamnern Stadium | Bangkok, Thailand | Decision | 5 | 3:00 |
| 2020-11-27 | Win | (Thailand) Nobita ChinoMuaythai | Muaymanwansuk, Rangsit Stadium | Pathum Thani, Thailand | Decision | 5 | 3:00 |
| 2020-10-02 | Win | (Thailand) Samingdet Nayokpodkabinburi | Muaymanwansuk, Rangsit Stadium | Pathum Thani, Thailand | Decision | 5 | 3:00 |
| 2020-07-31 | Win | (Thailand) Addthewada Tor.Surat | Muaymanwansuk, Rangsit Stadium | Pathum Thani, Thailand | Decision | 5 | 3:00 |
| 2020-02-28 | Win | (Thailand) Nonghanlek MTM Academy | Muaymanwansuk + Petchpiya, Rangsit Stadium | Pathum Thani, Thailand | Decision | 5 | 3:00 |
| 2020-01-24 | Loss | (Thailand) Petchsila Wor.Auracha | Petchpiya + Sirilak Muay Thai, Lumpinee Stadium | Bangkok, Thailand | Decision | 5 | 3:00 |
| 2019-12-25 | Win | (Thailand) Paithong Sor.Sarinya | Wan Kingthong | Bangkok, Thailand | KO | 2 | |
| 2019-10-03 | Win | (Thailand) Phanomkorn SrisawadGym | Petchyindee, Rajadamnern Stadium | Bangkok, Thailand | Decision | 5 | 3:00 |
| 2019-08-27 | Loss | (Thailand) Kongburapha Thiptamai | Khunsuk Trakunyang, Lumpinee Stadium | Bangkok, Thailand | KO | 3 | |
| 2019-06-01 | Win | (Japan) Ryuya Okuwaki | BOM -The Battle Of Muay Thai- season II vol.2 | Yokohama, Japan | Decision (Unanimous) | 5 | 3:00 |
Wins the vacant WBC Muay Thai World 105 lbs title
| 2019-04-10 | Loss | (Thailand) BoyUbon AunSukhumvit | Wanmeechai, Rajadamnern Stadium | Bangkok, Thailand | Decision | 5 | 3:00 |
| 2019-01-18 | Loss | (Thailand) Peerapat Muayded789 | Wanchaichana, Lumpinee Stadium | Bangkok, Thailand | Decision | 5 | 3:00 |
| 2018-10-29 | Loss | (Thailand) Kongburapha Thiptamai | Petchyindee, Rajadamnern Stadium | Bangkok, Thailand | Decision | 5 | 3:00 |
| 2018-10-05 | Win | (Thailand) Phet Parunchai | Muaymanwasuk | Thailand | Decision | 5 | 3:00 |
| 2018-08-29 | Win | (Japan) Ryuya Okuwaki | Suk Wan Kingthong Muay Thai Super Fight | Tokyo, Japan | Decision | 5 | 3:00 |
| 2018-07-20 | Win | (Thailand) Chaichana Por.WisetGym | Muaymanwasuk, Rangsit Stadium | Pathum Thani, Thailand | Decision | 5 | 3:00 |
| 2018-06-07 | Loss | (Thailand) Kongburapha Thiptamai | Petchyindee, Rajadamnern Stadium | Bangkok, Thailand | KO | 3 | |
| 2018-04-30 | Win | (Thailand) Buakhaolek Lukkhlongtan | Petchyindee, Rajadamnern Stadium | Bangkok, Thailand | Decision | 5 | 3:00 |
| 2018-02-15 | Win | (Thailand) Peerapat Muayded789 | Wanmeechai, Rajadamnern Stadium | Bangkok, Thailand | KO | 4 | |
| 2018-01-03 | Win | (Thailand) Davinci LuckyBantong | Wanmeechai, Rajadamnern Stadium | Bangkok, Thailand | Decision | 5 | 3:00 |
| 2017-12-11 | Win | (Thailand) Krungthep Sor.Chokmeechai | Wanmeechai, Rajadamnern Stadium | Bangkok, Thailand | KO | 3 | |
| 2017-11-09 | Win | (Thailand) Phalangpop Por.Muangphet | Petchyindee, Rajadamnern Stadium | Bangkok, Thailand | Decision | 5 | 3:00 |
| 2017-09-04 | Win | (Thailand) Yodphupha OrBorTor.Nonthong | Wanmeechai, Rajadamnern Stadium | Bangkok, Thailand | Decision | 5 | 3:00 |
| 2017-07-12 | Loss | (Thailand) Petchjongrak Wor.Sangprapai | Wanmeechai, Rajadamnern Stadium | Bangkok, Thailand | Decision | 5 | 3:00 |
| 2017-06-21 | Win | (Thailand) Luktong Wor.Petchchonchan | Petchyindee, Rajadamnern Stadium | Bangkok, Thailand | Decision | 5 | 3:00 |
| 2017-05-11 | Win | (Thailand) Mangkornyuk TN MuayThai | Wanmeechai, Rajadamnern Stadium | Bangkok, Thailand | Decision | 5 | 3:00 |
| 2017-04-19 | Loss | (Thailand) Petchjongrak Wor.Sangprapai | Wanmeechai, Rajadamnern Stadium | Bangkok, Thailand | Decision | 5 | 3:00 |
| 2017-02-27 | Loss | (Thailand) KhaenIsan Kiatchankiew | Petchyindee, Rajadamnern Stadium | Bangkok, Thailand | Decision | 5 | 3:00 |
| 2017-01-25 | Win | (Thailand) Nuaphet Jenwitkorsang | Wanmeechai, Rajadamnern Stadium | Bangkok, Thailand | Decision | 5 | 3:00 |
| 2016-11-21 | Win | (Thailand) Misaplek Moopingaroijungbey | Wanmeechai, Rajadamnern Stadium | Bangkok, Thailand | Decision | 5 | 3:00 |
| 2016-09-12 | Loss | (Thailand) Petchjongrak Wor.Sangprapai | Wanmeechai | Thailand | Decision | 5 | 3:00 |
| 2016-08-01 | Win | (Thailand) Buakhaolek Lukkhlongtan | Petchwiset, Rajadamnern Stadium | Bangkok, Thailand | Decision | 5 | 3:00 |
| 2016-07-06 | Loss | (Thailand) Misaplek Moopingaroijungbey | Wanmeechai, Rajadamnern Stadium | Bangkok, Thailand | Decision | 5 | 3:00 |
| 2016-05-18 | Loss | (Thailand) Petchthailand Moopingaroijung | Wanmeechai, Rajadamnern Stadium | Bangkok, Thailand | Decision | 5 | 3:00 |
Legend: Win Loss Draw/No contest Notes
