= Phetsuphan Por.Daorungruang =

Thai Muay Thai fighter

- Born: Chalongchai Minindi; 1992 (age 33–34); Song Phi Nong district, Suphan Buri province, Thailand
- Other names: Petchsuphan Songpon.KNC (ทรงพล เค.เอ็น.ซี.); PetchSuphan Por.Prajansi; Petchsuphan Luknongpantao
- Height: 164 cm (5 ft 5 in)
- Weight: 52 kg (115 lb; 8.2 st)
- Fighting out of: Suphan Buri province, Thailand
- Team: Por Daorungruang

Phetsuphan Por.Daorungruang (Thai: เพชรสุพรรณ ป.ดาวรุ่งเรือง) is a Thai Muay Thai fighter.

== Titles and accomplishments ==
- Rajadamnern Stadium
  - 2017 Rajadamnern Stadium 115 lbs Champion
    - Five successful title defenses
- Onesongchai
  - 2025 S1 Super Flyweight (115 lbs) World Champion
    - One successful title defense
- Muaydee VitheeThai
  - 2026 Muaydee VitheeThai Bantamweight (118 lbs) Champion
- International Federation of Muaythai Associations
  - 2021 IFMA World Championships -51 kg (gold)
  - 2024 IFMA World Championships -51 kg (silver)
  - 2025 IFMA World Championships -51 kg (silver)
- Southeast Asian Games
  - 2025 SEA Games Muaythai -51 kg (bronze)

== Fight record ==
Muay Thai Record
Date	Result	Opponent	Event	Location	Method	Round	Time
2026-08-14	Loss	(Thailand) Bakjo Sitkhunma	ONE The Inner Circle 26, Lumpinee Stadium	Bangkok, Thailand	Decision (Unanimous)	3	3:00
2026-06-21	Win	(Thailand) Nuatoranee Pudprachachuen	Muaydee VitheeThai, Jitmuangnon Stadium	Nonthaburi province, Thailand	KO	5	
Wins the Muaydee VitheeThai Bantamweight (118 lbs) title.
2026-05-24	Win	(Thailand) Petchthongkao PacharaGym	Muaydee VitheeThai, Jitmuangnon Stadium	Nonthaburi province, Thailand	Decision	5	3:00
2026-04-25	Win	(Thailand) Bakjo Sitkhunma	Onesongchai, Sanam 100 Rai opposite Wat Phra Sri Arn	Ratchaburi province, Thailand	Decision	5	3:00
Defends the S-1 Super Flyweight (115 lbs) title.
2026-03-06	Loss	(Thailand) Tandiao Por.Prawit	Jitmuangnon, Jitmuangnon Stadium	Nonthaburi province, Thailand	Decision	5	3:00
2026-01-16	Win	(Thailand) Nueapathapee Putthiprachachuen	Jitmuangnon, Jitmuangnon Stadium	Nonthaburi province, Thailand	KO	4	
2025-10-11	Loss	(Thailand) Petchsaenchai Jitmuangnon	Jitmuangnon, Jitmuangnon Stadium	Nonthaburi province, Thailand	Decision	5	3:00
For the vacant Jitmuangnon Super Flyweight (115 lbs) title.
2025-08-23	Loss	(Thailand) Phetkriengkrai Jitmuangnon	Jitmuangnon, Jitmuangnon Stadium	Nonthaburi province, Thailand	Decision	5	3:00
2025-07-26	Win	(Thailand) Petchsaenchai Jitmuangnon	Jitmuangnon, Jitmuangnon Stadium	Nonthaburi province, Thailand	Decision	5	3:00
2025-06-25	Win	(Thailand) Anchan J-PowerRoofChiangMai	Onesongchai, Jitmuangnon Stadium	Nonthaburi province, Thailand	Decision	5	3:00
Wins the vacant S-1 Super Flyweight (115 lbs) title.
2025-02-22	Win	(Thailand) Falan Por.Petchkaikaew	Jitmuangnon, Jitmuangnon Stadium	Nonthaburi province, Thailand	Decision	5	3:00
2025-01-20	Win	(Thailand) Petchpasak Sor.Salacheep	Muay Thai Pantamit	Thailand	Decision	5	3:00
2024-12-21	Loss	(Thailand) Kachasit ThaSaeYasat	Jitmuangnon, Jitmuangnon Stadium	Nonthaburi province, Thailand	Decision	5	3:00
2024-11-23	Loss	(Thailand) Srimalai Phetcharoenwit	Jitmuangnon, Siam Omnoi Stadium	Samut Sakhon, Thailand	Decision	5	3:00
2024-09-11	Win	(Thailand) PetchEk Kiatjamroon	Palangmai, Rajadamnern Stadium	Bangkok, Thailand	Decision	5	3:00
2024-08-11	Win	(Thailand) Anchan J-PowerRoofChiang Mai	Muay Thai Vithee Thai, Jitmuangnon Stadium	Nonthaburi province, Thailand	TKO	4	
2024-06-30	Win	(Thailand) Chatpichit SorJor.Toipaedriew	Muay Thai Vithee Thai, Jitmuangnon Stadium	Nonthaburi province, Thailand	Decision	5	3:00
2024-04-27	Loss	(Thailand) Dechaphanu Sor.Pongamorn	Jitmuangnon Stadium	Nonthaburi province, Thailand	Decision	5	3:00
2023-11-28	Loss	(Thailand) Rungwittaya Singhnawawut	Muaymunsananmuang, Rangsit Stadium	Pathum Thani, Thailand	KO	3	
2023-09-19	Win	(Thailand) Khunsuk PetchyindeeAcademy	Muaymunsananmuang, Rangsit Stadium	Pathum Thani, Thailand	Decision	5	3:00
2023-04-18	Loss	(Thailand) Khunsiam Wor.Sangprapai	Muaymunsananmuang, Rangsit Stadium	Pathum Thani, Thailand	KO	3	
2023-02-24	Loss	(Thailand) Mangkornlek Peinakhon	Muaymunwansuk, Rangsit Stadium	Pathum Thani, Thailand	Decision	5	3:00
2023-01-07	Loss	(Thailand) Kraduklek Kor.Klumkliaew	Muayded Sangweindeud, Or.Tor.Gor.3 Stadium	Nonthaburi, Thailand	KO	2	
2022-11-12	Loss	(Thailand) Petchseeta KobwasaduphantPhuket	Muay Thai Vithee Thai + Petchyindee Sanjorn	Chiang Rai, Thailand	Decision	5	3:00
2022-09-27	Loss	(Thailand) Padetsuek SorJor.TongPrachin	Onesongchai	Phetchabun province, Thailand	Decision	5	3:00
For the vacant S-1 Bantamweight title.
2022-08-20	Loss	(Thailand) YodUdon Or.UdUdon	Jitmuangnon Superfight, Or.Tor.Gor3 Stadium	Nonthaburi province, Thailand	Decision	5	3:00
2022-07-24	Win	(Thailand) Nompraew Tor.RatchatanGym	Muaydee Vitheethai + Jitmuangnon, Or.Tor.Gor.3 Stadium	Nonthaburi, Thailand	Decision	5	3:00
2022-05-01	Loss	(Thailand) Songchainoi Kiatsongrit	SuekMahachon Onesongchai	Kamphaeng Phet, Thailand	Decision	5	3:00
For the vacant S-1 Super Flyweight title.
2022-02-27	Win	(Thailand) Sunday Chaiyaigym	Muaydee Vitheethai + Jitmuangnon, Or.Tor.Gor.3 Stadium	Nonthaburi, Thailand	Decision	5	3:00
2022-01-09	Loss	(Thailand) Nuathoranee Jitmuangnon	Muaydee Vitheethai + Jitmuangnon, Or.Tor.Gor3 Stadium	Nonthaburi province, Thailand	Decision	5	3:00
For the vacant Jitmuangnon Stadium Flyweight title.
2021-09-25	Win	(Thailand) Den Sor.PhetUdon	Lumpinee GoSport, Lumpinee Stadium	Bangkok, Thailand	Decision	5	3:00
2021-04-05	Loss	(Thailand) Oleylek Sor.Kaenjai	Chef Boontham, Rangsit Stadium	Rangsit, Thailand	Decision	5	3:00
2020-10-10	Loss	(Thailand) Phetsomjit Jitmuangnon	Jitmuangnon + Sor.KafeMuayThai, Or.Tor.Gor 3 Stadium	Nonthaburi, Thailand	Decision	5	3:00
2020-09-12	Loss	(Thailand) Phetsomjit Jitmuangnon	Yodmuay Onesongchai, Thanakorn Stadium	Nakhon Pathom, Thailand	Decision	5	3:00
2020-08-11	Loss	(Thailand) Phetsommai Sor.Sommai	Chef Boontham, Thanakorn Stadium	Nakhon Pathom Province, Thailand	Decision	5	3:00
2020-01-30	Loss	(Thailand) Kongchai Chanaidonmuang	Rajadamnern Stadium	Bangkok, Thailand	Decision	5	3:00
Lost the Rajadamnern Stadium 115 lbs title.
2019-12-19	Win	(Thailand) Phetsomjit Jitmuangnon	Rajadamnern Stadium	Bangkok, Thailand	Decision	5	3:00
Defends the Rajadamnern Stadium 115 lbs title.
2019-11-25	Win	(Thailand) Raktemroi 13coinstower	Rajadamnern Stadium	Bangkok, Thailand	Decision	5	3:00
2019-10-17	Loss	(Thailand) Puenkon Tor.Surat	Rajadamnern Stadium	Bangkok, Thailand	Decision	5	3:00
2019-09-15	Win	(Thailand) Priewpak SorJor.Vichitmuangpadriew	Blue Arena	Samut Prakan, Thailand	Decision	5	3:00
2019-06-06	Loss	(Thailand) Kumandoi Petcharoenvit	Rajadamnern Stadium	Bangkok, Thailand	KO (Head Kick)	2	
2019-03-28	Win	(Thailand) Phetsommai Sor.Sommai	Rajadamnern Stadium	Bangkok, Thailand	Decision	5	3:00
2019-02-11	Win	(Thailand) Wanmawin Pumpanmuang	Rajadamnern Stadium	Bangkok, Thailand	Decision	5	3:00
Defends the Rajadamnern Stadium 115 lbs title.
2018-12-27	Win	(Thailand) Raktemroi SorJor.Vichitmuangpadriew	Rajadamnern Stadium	Bangkok, Thailand	Decision	5	3:00
2018-12-06	Win	(Thailand) Puenkon Tor.Surat	Rajadamnern Stadium	Bangkok, Thailand	Decision	5	3:00
2018-11-01	Win	(Thailand) Raktemroi SorJor.Vichitmuangpadriew	Rajadamnern Stadium	Bangkok, Thailand	Decision	5	3:00
2018-09-20	Win	(Thailand) Kongmuangtrang Kaewsamrit	Rajadamnern Stadium	Bangkok, Thailand	Decision	5	3:00
Defends the Rajadamnern Stadium 115 lbs title.
2018-08-30	Loss	(Thailand) Konkorn Kiatphontip	Rajadamnern Stadium	Bangkok, Thailand	Decision	5	3:00
2018-08-06	Win	(Thailand) Priewpak SorJor.Vichitpaedriw	Rajadamnern Stadium	Bangkok, Thailand	Decision	5	3:00
2018-07-05	Loss	(Thailand) Rungnarai Kiatmuu9	Rajadamnern Stadium	Bangkok, Thailand	Decision	5	3:00
2018-06-06	Win	(Thailand) Kumandoi Petcharoenvit	Rajadamnern Stadium	Bangkok, Thailand	Decision	5	3:00
2018-05-03	Win	(Thailand) Konkorn Kiatphontip	Rajadamnern Stadium	Bangkok, Thailand	Decision	5	3:00
2018-04-02	Loss	(Thailand) Kumandoi Petcharoenvit	Rajadamnern Stadium	Bangkok, Thailand	Decision	5	3:00
2018-03-05	Win	(Thailand) Kumandoi Petcharoenvit	Rajadamnern Stadium	Bangkok, Thailand	Decision (Unanimous)	5	3:00
Defends the Rajadamnern Stadium 115 lbs title.
2018-01-24	Win	(Thailand) Fahmongkhol Taembangsai	Rajadamnern Stadium	Bangkok, Thailand	KO	4	
Defends the Rajadamnern Stadium 115 lbs title.
2017-11-28	Win	(Thailand) Nong Rose Barnjaroensuk	Rajadamnern Stadium	Bangkok, Thailand	Decision	5	3:00
2017-11-02	Win	(Thailand) Nong Rose Barnjaroensuk	Rajadamnern Stadium	Bangkok, Thailand	Decision	5	3:00
Wins the vacant Rajadamnern Stadium 115 lbs title.
2017-09-09	Win	(Thailand) Daoroht Jitmuangnon	Omnoi Stadium	Samut Sakhon, Thailand	Decision	5	3:00
2017-07-24	Loss	(Thailand) Sanpetch Numsaenggorsang	Rajadamnern Stadium	Bangkok, Thailand	Decision	5	3:00
2017-06-15	Win	(Thailand) Wittayalek Moosapanmai	Rajadamnern Stadium	Bangkok, Thailand	Decision	5	3:00
2017-04-30	Loss	(Thailand) Ngapayak Or.Bor.Tor.Nonetong	Rangsit Stadium	Rangsit, Thailand	Decision	5	3:00
2017-03-25	Loss	(Thailand) Phetmuangchon Por.Suantong	Montri Studio	Rangsit, Thailand	KO	3	
2017-01-30	Win	(Thailand) Petchsamret OrBorTor.Nongyangtoy	Rajadamnern Stadium	Bangkok, Thailand	KO	3	
2017-01-07	Loss	(Thailand) Denmechai Tedsabanbansong	Montri Studio	Rangsit, Thailand	Decision	5	3:00
2016-11-30	Loss	(Thailand) Gingsanglek Tor.Laksong	Rajadamnern Stadium	Bangkok, Thailand	TKO (Su mai dai)	4	
2016-06-22	Loss	(Thailand) Phetpangan Mor.Ratanabandit	Rajadamnern Stadium	Bangkok, Thailand	Decision	5	3:00
2016-05-03	Win	(Japan) Kaito Wor.Wanchai	Suk Daurung Yutahatti	Suphan Buri Province, Thailand	Decision	5	3:00
2016-03-31	Loss	(Thailand) Phetmuangchon Por.Suantong	Rajadamnern Stadium	Bangkok, Thailand	Decision	5	3:00
2016-02-24	Win	(Thailand) Sayanlek Sayangym	Montri Studio	Bangkok, Thailand	Decision	5	3:00
2015-12-16	Win	(Thailand) Tito Hoywanpotchana	Rajadamnern Stadium	Bangkok, Thailand	Decision	5	3:00
2015-11-21	Win	(Thailand) Senthanong Tor.Silachai	Montri Studio	Bangkok, Thailand	Decision	5	3:00
2015-10-24	Loss	(Thailand) Saenpayak Por.Jaroenphet	Montri Studio	Bangkok, Thailand	Decision	5	3:00
2015-07-29	Loss	(Thailand) Sayanlek Sayangym	Rajadamnern Stadium	Bangkok, Thailand	KO	3	
2015-06-24	Win	(Thailand) Senthanong Tor.Silachai	Rajadamnern Stadium	Bangkok, Thailand	Decision	5	3:00
2015-05-27	Win	(Thailand) Chok Phor.Pat	Rajadamnern Stadium	Bangkok, Thailand	KO	3	
2015-04-27	Loss	(Thailand) Chok Phor.Pat	Rajadamnern Stadium	Bangkok, Thailand	Decision	5	3:00
2015-03-19	Loss	(Thailand) Ngapayak Or.Bor.Tor.Nonetong	Rajadamnern Stadium	Bangkok, Thailand	Decision	5	3:00
2015-02-09	Win	(Thailand) Senthanong Tor.Silachai	Rajadamnern Stadium	Bangkok, Thailand	Decision	5	3:00
2014-12-31	Loss	(Thailand) Phetmuangchon Por.Suantong	Rajadamnern Stadium	Bangkok, Thailand	Decision	5	3:00
2014-10-23	Win	(Thailand) Sueayai Chor.Haphayak	Rajadamnern Stadium	Bangkok, Thailand	KO	3	
Legend: Win Loss Draw/No contest Notes

Muay Thai Record
Date	Result	Opponent	Event	Location	Method	Round	Time
2025-12-16	Loss	(Philippines) LJ Rafael Yasay	SEA Games 2025, Semifinals	Bangkok, Thailand	Decision (29:28)	3	3:00
Wins 2025 SEA Games Muay Thai -51kg Bronze Medal.
2025-12-14	Win	(Vietnam) Dang Huynh Hai	SEA Games 2025, Quarterfinals	Bangkok, Thailand	TKO	2	
2025-05-31	Loss	(Turkey) Cihan Dogu	IFMA World Championships 2025, Final	Kemer, Turkey	Decision (29:28)	3	3:00
Wins 2025 IFMA World Championships -51kg Silver Medal.
2025-05-30	Win	(Russia) Alim Khasbulatov	IFMA World Championships 2025, Semifinals	Kemer, Turkey	Decision (29:28)	3	3:00
2025-05-27	Win	(Philippines) LJ Rafael Yasay	IFMA World Championships 2025, Quarterfinals	Kemer, Turkey	Decision (29:28)	3	3:00
2024-06-09	Loss	(Russia) Ovsep Aslanyan	IFMA World Championships 2024, Final	Patras, Greece	Decision (29:28)	3	3:00
Wins 2024 IFMA World Championships -51kg Silver Medal.
2024-06-06	Win	(United Arab Emirates) Mohamed Touizi	IFMA World Championships 2024, Semifinals	Patras, Greece	Decision (29:28)	3	3:00
2024-06-05	Win	(Kazakhstan) Shamil Kurbanov	IFMA World Championships 2024, Quarterfinals	Patras, Greece	TKO	2	
2021-12-11	Win	(Turkey) Sheikh Samil Kalhan	IFMA World Championships 2021, Final	Bangkok, Thailand	Decision	3	3:00
Wins 2021 IFMA World Championships -51kg Gold Medal.
2021-12-10	Win	(Russia) Ovsep Aslanyan	IFMA World Championships 2021, Semi Final	Bangkok, Thailand	Decision	3	3:00
2021-12-09	Win	(India) Pynnehbor Mylliemngap	IFMA World Championships 2021, Quarter Final	Bangkok, Thailand	TKO		
Legend: Win Loss Draw/No contest Notes
