= Phetsommai Sor.Sommai =

Thai Muay Thai fighter

- Born: Chiraphong Paejumpoo; December 19, 1997 (age 28); Lamphun, Thailand
- Other names: Yokpetch Thanasaktransport
- Nationality: Thai
- Height: 162 cm (5 ft 4 in)
- Weight: 53 kg (117 lb; 8.3 st)
- Style: Muay Fimeu
- Stance: Orthodox
- Fighting out of: Bangkok, Thailand
- Team: Sor.Sommai

Phetsommai Sor.Sommai (Thai: เพชรสมหมาย ส.สมหมาย) is a Thai Muay Thai fighter.

== Biography and career ==
Phetsommai was introduced to Muay Thai at 8 years old by his father. After only 20 days of training he started his career as Yokpetch Thanasaktransport and won his first nine fights. At 17 years old he moved to Bangkok to join the Sor.Sommai gym and changed his ring name to Phetsommai.

In 2018 Phetsommai became a prominent figure in the stadiums as he stayed undefeated for 9 fights over the course of a year and won the Channel 5 and Rajadamnern Stadium 112 lbs belts. He was on the short list for the "Fighter of the Year" award.

On August 9, 2019 Phetsommai went up in weight for a superfight of stadium champions against Lumpinee 115 lbs champion Rungnarai Kiatmuu9, Phetsommai suffered a knockdown in the third round and lost by decision.

In 2023, Phetsommai opened a coffee shop in Thoen District, Lampang province.

== Titles and accomplishments ==
- Rajadamnern Stadium
  - 2018 Rajadamnern Stadium 112 lbs Champion (one successful defense)
- Siam Omnoi Stadium
  - 2019 Omnoi Stadium 115 lbs Champion
  - 2022 Omnoi Stadium 118 lbs Champion
- Professional Boxing Association of Thailand (PAT)
  - 2021 Thailand (PAT) 118 lbs Champion
- Channel 5
  - 2018 Channel 5 112 lbs Champion

== Fight record ==
Muay Thai Record
Date	Result	Opponent	Event	Location	Method	Round	Time
2026-05-02	Win	(Uzbekistan) Daler Sobirov	Rajadamnern World Series	Bangkok, Thailand	KO (Left hook)	1	1:54
2025-11-15	Loss	(Thailand) Surasak KruDamGym	Rajadamnern World Series	Bangkok, Thailand	Decision (Unanimous)	3	3:00
2024-04-09	Win	(Thailand) Thanachart Sitnayokpansak	Wat San Pa Lan Temple	Tak province, Thailand	Decision	5	3:00
2023-03-31	Loss	(Thailand) Oleylek Chor.Hapayak	ONE Friday Fights 11, Lumpinee Stadium	Bangkok, Thailand	Decision (Split)	3	3:00
2023-02-14	Loss	(Thailand) Chalamdam Nayokathasala	Muaymansananmuang Uthai	Uthai Thani province, Thailand	Decision	5	3:00
2023-01-23	Loss	(Thailand) Yodsila Chor.Hapayak	Muay Thai Pantamit, Thupatemi Stadium	Pathum Thani, Thailand	Decision	5	3:00
2022-12-10	Win	(Thailand) Jakdao Petchkiatpetch	Suekjao Muaythai, Omnoi Stadium	Samut Sakhon, Thailand	Decision	5	3:00
2022-10-22	Loss	(Thailand) Kumandoi PetchyindeeAcademy	Ruamponkon Meepuen	Samut Sakhon province, Thailand	KO (Left Hook)	1	
2022-06-20	Win	(Thailand) Petchsila Wor.Auracha	U-Muay RuamJaiKonRakMuayThai + Palangmai, Rajadamnern Stadium	Bangkok, Thailand	Decision	5	3:00
2022-04-28	Win	(Thailand) Ittipon Singmawynn	Suekjao Muaythai, Omnoi Stadium	Samut Sakhon, Thailand	Decision	5	3:00
Wins the vacant Omnoi Stadium 118 lbs title.
2022-03-27	Win	(Thailand) Chokpanlan Por.Lakboon	Chang MuayThai Kiatpetch Amarin Super Fight, Rajadamnern Stadium	Bangkok, Thailand	Decision	5	3:00
2021-11-27	Win	(Thailand) Ittipon Singmawynn	Suekjao Muaythai, Omnoi Stadium	Samut Sakhon, Thailand	Decision	5	3:00
Wins the vacant Thailand 118 lbs title.
2021-03-17	Loss	(Thailand) Chokpanlan Por.Lakboon	Sor.Thanapon, Rajadamnern Stadium	Bangkok, Thailand	Decision	5	3:00
2020-12-10	Loss	(Thailand) Jomhod Eminentair	Rajadamnern Stadium	Bangkok, Thailand	Decision	5	3:00
2020-11-17	Loss	(Thailand) Chokpanlan Por.Lakboon	Sor.Sommai, CentralPlaza Nakhon Ratchasima	Nakhon Ratchasima, Thailand	Decision	5	3:00
2020-10-09	Loss	(Thailand) Puenkon Tor.Surat	True4U Muaymanwansuk, Rangsit Stadium	Rangsit, Thailand	Decision	5	3:00
2020-09-15	Win	(Thailand) Chanalert Meenayothin	Chef Boontham Birthday, Omnoi Stadium	Samut Sakhon, Thailand	Decision	5	3:00
2020-08-11	Win	(Thailand) Phetsuphan Por.Daorungruang	Chef Boontham, Thanakorn Stadium	Nakhon Pathom Province, Thailand	Decision	5	3:00
2020-07-11	Loss	(Thailand) Phetsomjit Jitmuangnon	SuekJaoMuayThai Omnoi Stadium	Samut Sakhon, Thailand	Decision	5	3:00
2020-02-28	Win	(Thailand) Phetsomjit Jitmuangnon	Ruamponkonchon Pratan Super Fight	Pathum Thani, Thailand	Decision	5	3:00
2020-01-31	Loss	(Thailand) Rungnarai Kiatmuu9	Phuket Super Fight Real Muay Thai	Mueang Phuket District, Thailand	Decision	5	3:00
2019-12-26	Loss	(Thailand) Satanmuanglek PetchyindeeAcademy	Rajadamnern Stadium	Bangkok, Thailand	KO (Elbow)	3	
2019-11-25	Loss	(Thailand) Phetsomjit Jitmuangnon	Rajadamnern Stadium	Bangkok, Thailand	Decision (Unanimous)	5	3:00
Lost the Rajadamnern Stadium 112 lbs title.
2019-10-12	Win	(Thailand) Phetsomjit Jitmuangnon	Omnoi Stadium	Samut Sakhon, Thailand	Decision (Unanimous)	5	3:00
Wins the vacant Omnoi Stadium 115 lbs title.
2019-08-09	Loss	(Thailand) Rungnarai Kiatmuu9	Lumpinee Stadium	Bangkok, Thailand	Decision (Unanimous)	5	3:00
For the Lumpinee Stadium 115 lbs title.
2019-07-04	Win	(Thailand) Den Sor.Phet-Udon	Rajadamnern Stadium	Bangkok, Thailand	Decision	5	3:00
Defended the Rajadamnern Stadium 112 lbs title.
2019-05-24	Win	(Thailand) Phetparin Sitnumnoi	Rajadamnern Stadium	Bangkok, Thailand	KO (Left High Kick)	2	
2019-03-28	Loss	(Thailand) Phetsuphan Por.Daorungruang	Rajadamnern Stadium	Bangkok, Thailand	Decision	5	3:00
2019-02-14	Win	(Thailand) Raktemroi Sor.Jor.Vichitpadriew	Rajadamnern Stadium	Bangkok, Thailand	Decision	5	3:00
2019-01-08	Win	(Thailand) Raktemroi Sor.Jor.Vichitpadriew	Sor.Sommai RuamJaiMutitaKruAriyaChat	Chiang Rai, Thailand	KO	4	
2018-11-13	Draw	(Thailand) Kompetch Sitsarawatsuer	Lumpinee Stadium	Bangkok, Thailand	Decision	5	3:00
2018-10-15	Win	(Thailand) Priewpak SorJor.Vichitpadriew	Rajadamnern Stadium	Bangkok, Thailand	Decision	5	3:00
2018-09-07	Win	(Thailand) Kompetch Sitsarawatsuer	Lumpinee Stadium	Bangkok, Thailand	Decision	5	3:00
2018-08-08	Win	(Thailand) Chokploengrit Por.Lakboon	Rajadamnern Stadium	Bangkok, Thailand	TKO (Referee Stoppage)	4	
Won the vacant Rajadamnern Stadium 112 lbs title.
2018-04-23	Win	(Thailand) Phetvichit Sor.Jor.Vichitpadriew	Rajadamnern Stadium	Bangkok, Thailand	Decision	5	3:00
2018-03-26	Win	(Thailand) Rit Jitmuangnon	Rajadamnern Stadium	Bangkok, Thailand	Decision	5	3:00
2018-02-18	Win	(Thailand) Pangtor Por.Lakboon	Rangsit Stadium	Pathum Thani, Thailand	Decision	5	3:00
Won the Channel 5 112 lbs title.
2018-01-29	Win	(Thailand) Deuan Kor.Kampanath	Rajadamnern Stadium	Bangkok, Thailand	Decision	5	3:00
2017-11-28	Loss	(Thailand) Den Sor.Phet-Udon		Thailand	Decision	5	3:00
2017-09-27	Loss	(Thailand) KoKo Paeminburi	Lumpinee Stadium	Bangkok, Thailand	Decision	5	3:00
2017-08-08	Win	(Thailand) KoKo Paeminburi	Lumpinee Stadium	Bangkok, Thailand	Decision	5	3:00
2017-06-19	Win	(Thailand) Supernai Teeded99	Lumpinee Stadium	Bangkok, Thailand	KO	3	
2017-04-10	Loss	(Thailand) Chatploy Sor.Poonsawat	Rajadamnern Stadium	Bangkok, Thailand	KO	3	
2017-03-09	Win	(Thailand) Supernai Teeded99	Rajadamnern Stadium	Bangkok, Thailand	Decision	5	3:00
2017-01-11	Win	(Thailand) Ritichai Sor.Kitichai	Rajadamnern Stadium	Bangkok, Thailand	KO	3	
2016-12-08	Win	(Thailand) BinLaden ChiangKhong	Rajadamnern Stadium	Bangkok, Thailand	Decision	5	3:00
2016-10-12	Loss	(Thailand) Kwangphet Muayhunumbangkadi	Rajadamnern Stadium	Bangkok, Thailand	Decision	5	3:00
2016-06-13	Loss	(Thailand) Phettamaew Sor.Sattra	Rajadamnern Stadium	Bangkok, Thailand	Decision	5	3:00
2015-12-03	Win	(Thailand) Phetniyom F.A.Group	Rajadamnern Stadium	Bangkok, Thailand	Decision	5	3:00
2015-08-13	Loss	(Thailand) Saoek Chaiwat	Rajadamnern Stadium	Bangkok, Thailand	Decision	5	3:00
2015-07-17	Win	(Thailand) Toto Tor.Thawat	Lumpinee Stadium	Bangkok, Thailand	KO	3	
2015-06-15	Win	(Thailand) Chokvittaya Pumpanmuang	Rajadamnern Stadium	Bangkok, Thailand	Decision	5	3:00
2014-12-28	Loss	(Thailand) Narongdej A.Wanchet	Rajadamnern Stadium	Bangkok, Thailand	Decision	5	3:00
2014-12-04	Loss	(Thailand) Chatploy Sor.Poonsawat	Rajadamnern Stadium	Bangkok, Thailand	Decision	5	3:00
2014-09-08	Win	(Thailand) Rungpetch JSP	Rajadamnern Stadium	Bangkok, Thailand	KO	4	
Legend: Win Loss Draw/No contest Notes
