= Nuttadaj Vachirarattanawong =

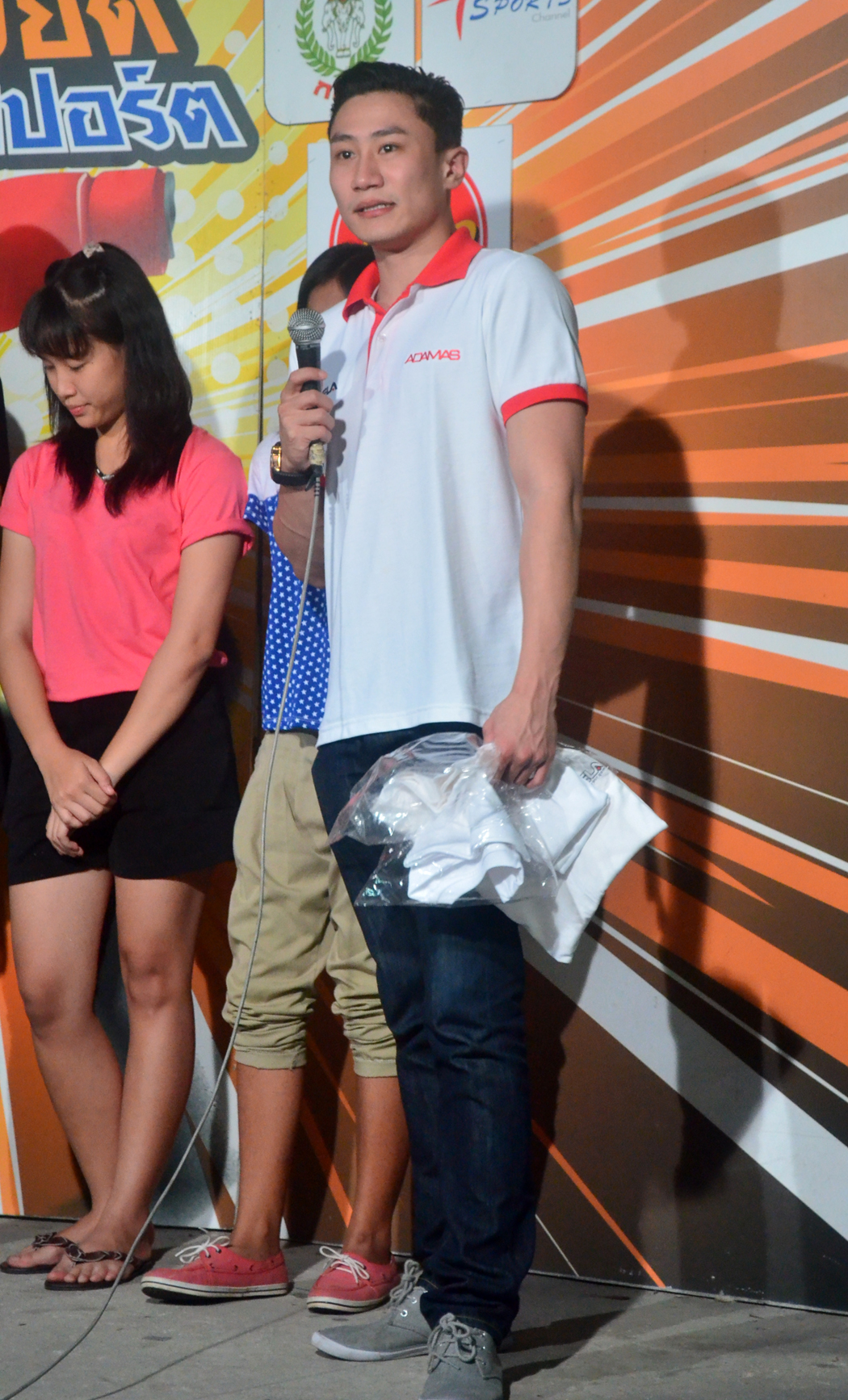
Nattadet Wachirarattanawong

Nuttadaj Vachirarattanawong (Thai: ณัฐเดช วชิรรัตนวงศ์, born on 9 October 1987), nicknamed Boat, is a Thai Muay Thai and boxing promoter. He is the owner of both Petchyindee Academy and Petchyindee Promotions.

== Biography ==
He is Virat Vachirarattanawong's first child and he has a younger sister. He graduated from Saint Gabriel's College and Assumption University.

In 2021, Vachirarattanawong was involved in the controversy surrounding Lethwei fighter Dave Leduc's social media post where he stated that Muay Thai was "softened version of Burmese Boxing" criticized Muay Thai fighter Buakaw Banchamek and said that the claims surrounding the Nai Khanom Tom folklore story were false and that he was simply a prisoner in ancient Burma during the Burmese–Siamese War. The post sparked considerable backlash from the Muaythai and combat sports community. It became known that Vachirarattanawong urged the Myanmar Traditional Lethwei Federation to reprimand Leduc, after the federation published a letter stating that Muaythai promoters made a complaint about Leduc. According to the MTLF, Leduc had "committed personal attacks" on Buakaw Banchamek and Muaythai history potentially tarnishing the relationship between Myanmar and Thailand.

== Muay Thai presenter ==
- SUK MUAY MANS WAN SUK
- SUK PETCH YIN DEE
- SUK YOD MUAY THAI TOR BOR BOR 5
