= Rangsit Stadium =

Mauy Thai stadium and promotor

- สนามมวยนานาชาติเวทีมวยรังสิต
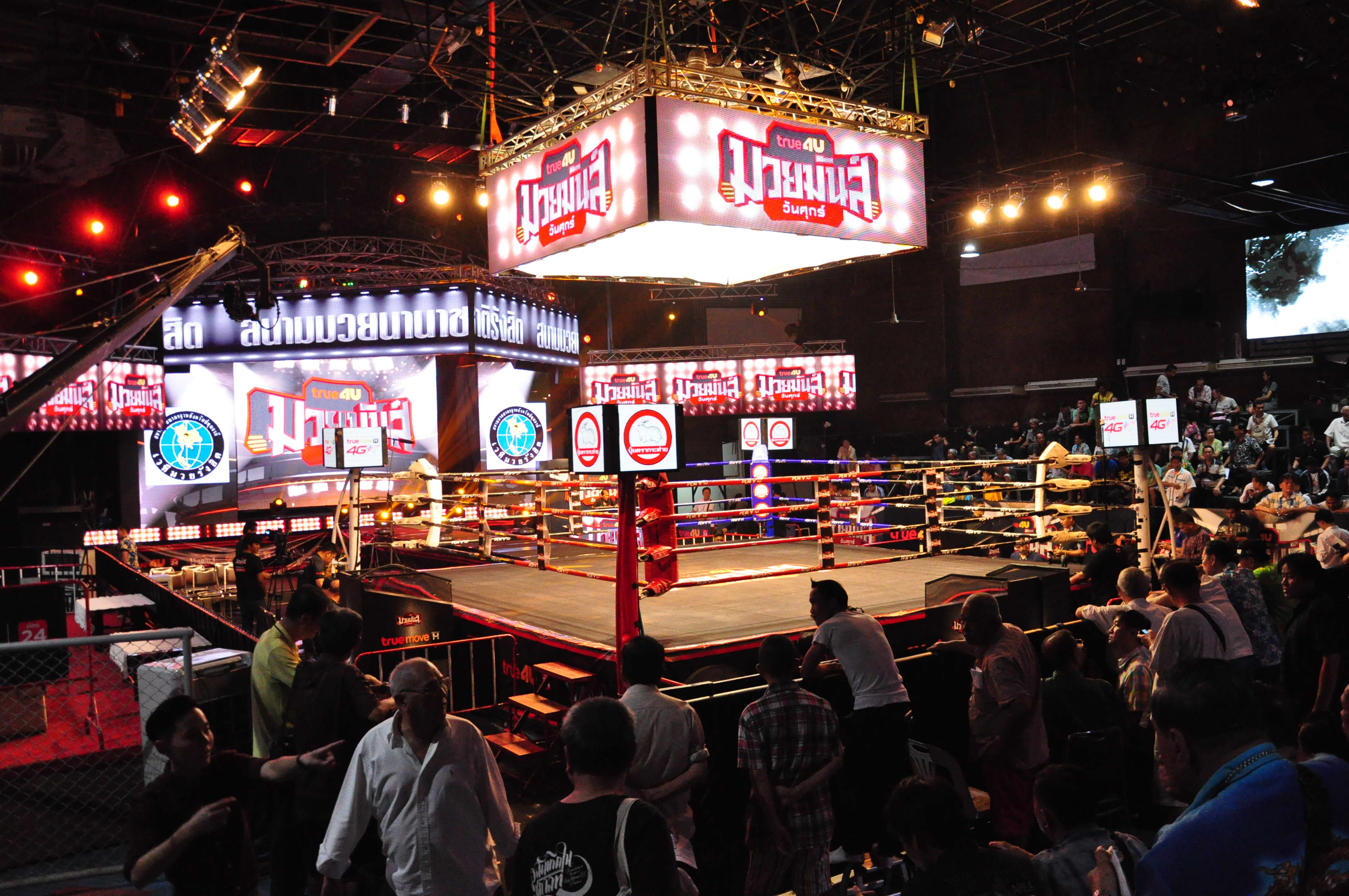
- Interactive map of Rangsit Stadium
- Address: Rangsit; Thailand
- Location: 323 Phahonyothin Rd, Tambon Prachathipat, Thanyaburi District, Pathum Thani 12130
- Coordinates: 13°58′45.2″N 100°37′01.5″E
- Owner: Nuttadaj Vachirarattanawong
- Operator: Petchyindee Academy
- Seating type: Chair
- Type: Muay Thai stadium and promotor
- Event: Martial arts
- Field size: TV Broadcasts
- Field shape: Square
- Parking: Available

Construction
- Years active: 1962-present
- Main contractor: True Sport

Rangsit Stadium (Thai: สนามมวยนานาชาติเวทีมวยรังสิต) is a stadium, organizer, TV Show and live broadcaster of Muay Thai events in Rangsit. The struggles of the Rangsit Stadium are approved by WMC (World Boxing Council Muaythai) ranking. Rangsit Stadium also hosts IFMA events.

== History ==
Rangsit Stadium has been established by Prasit U-rairat since 1962. He was the governor of Patomtsani. his goals were to promote Muay Thai around Pathumthani province but Muay Thai was not accepted by the people at that time, so the stadium was closed until and he look for a new owner through auction.

In 1962, Amuay Kesbumrung, who was very interested in owning the stadium, won the auction with an initial budget of about 20,000 THB and make Rangsit Stadium near Klong Rangsit was built. In 1966, the stadium moved to the Sack Factory with a budget of about 160,000 THB. Rangsit Stadium operated for three years from 1966 to 1969 and then moved to another location.

In 1970, Rangsit Stadium reopened with a 10-year contract. The stadium hosted and organized professional Muay Thai fights that had produced many of Muay Thai's most popular and great fighters for a decade. By 2010, more than 80,000 professional fights had taken place at Rangsit Stadium.

In 2010, with renovations, the stadium became a new Muay Thai stadium with sound system, lighting system, LED display, air conditioning, underground toilets with LCD TV and air conditioning.

== Live broadcasts ==
From 2018, the Rangsit Stadium events will be broadcast live on True Sport. The events of this stadium are temporarily suspended due to the epidemic of COVID-19.

== Events list ==
- MUAYTHAI LIVE ON TGN Channel (2011)
- MUAYTHAI TRUE VISIONS (2012-2013)
- MUAYTHAI TGN (2012)
- MUAYDEE VITHITHAI (2014-2015)
- True4U Fight Night (2016-2017)
- MuayDee WithiThai (2016-2017)
- MuayThai Channel 5 (2016-2017)
- MuayThai Channel 5 (2018–present)
- True4U Fight Night (2018–present)
- Youth MuayThai fight (No TV Live) (2018–present)

== See also ==
- List of sport venues in Bangkok
- True Sport
