= Wanchainoi Sitsarawatseur =

Thai Muay Thai fighter

- Born: Wanchai Chaingama; November 3, 2001 (age 24); Sakon Nakhon, Thailand
- Other names: Wanchainoi P.K.Saenchaimuaythaigym; Wanchainoi Rabiangfoodnakhopanom; Wanchainoi Sitnayokgaipaedriw; Wanchainoi SorTor.Hiewbangsaen; Wanchainoi Singplapaknoi; Wanchainoi PanthongGym
- Height: 165 cm (5 ft 5 in)
- Division: Light Flyweight; Flyweight; Bantamweight
- Style: Muay Thai
- Stance: Southpaw
- Fighting out of: Samut Prakan, Thailand
- Team: Sitsarawatseur Gym

Kickboxing record
- Total: 79
- Wins: 62
- Losses: 17

Wanchai Chaingama (Thai: ???; born November 3, 2001), known professionally as Wanchainoi Sitsarawatseur (Thai: วันชัยน้อย ศิษย์สารวัตรเสือ) is a Thai Muay Thai fighter and musician. He is a former Lumpinee Stadium Light Flyweight Champion, Thailand Flyweight Champion, and Channel 7 Stadium Bantamweight Champion.

As of October 2024, he is ranked #3 at Bantamweight according to both the WMO and Combat Press.

== Titles and accomplishments ==
- Channel 7 Stadium
  - 2024 Channel 7 Stadium Bantamweight (118 lbs) Champion
- Professional Boxing Association of Thailand (PAT)
  - 2018 Thailand Flyweight (112 lbs) Champion
- Lumpinee Stadium
  - 2018 Lumpinee Stadium Light Flyweight (108 lbs) Champion
  - 2018 Lumpinee Stadium Rising Star of the Year
- Thailand Regional titles
  - 2013 Nakhon Phanom 27 kg Champion
  - 2014 Isaan 29 kg Champion
  - 2015 Isaan 32 kg Champion

Awards

- 2018 Golden Glove Muay Thai Fighter of the Year

== Fight record ==
Muay Thai Record
Date	Result	Opponent	Event	Location	Method	Round	Time
2026-08-14	Loss	(Laos) Petnamkhong Sor.Maneekhot	ONE: The Inner Circle 26, Lumpinee Stadium	Bangkok, Thailand	Decision (unanimous)	3	3:00
2026-06-26	Win	(Thailand) Dokmaipa Santiubon	ONE Friday Fights 160, Lumpinee Stadium	Bangkok, Thailand	KO (Punches)	1	0:54
2026-02-20	Win	(Myanmar) Hlaing Htet Aung	ONE Friday Fights 143, Lumpinee Stadium	Bangkok, Thailand	TKO (Body punch and knee)	3	2:03
2025-10-10	Win	(Thailand) Koko Mor.Ratanabundit	ONE Friday Fights 128, Lumpinee Stadium	Bangkok, Thailand	Decision (Unanimous)	3	3:00
2025-07-13	Loss	(Thailand) Petchsiam Jor.Pattreya	Channel 7 Stadium	Bangkok, Thailand	Decision	5	3:00
2025-04-13	Loss	(Thailand) Chalamdam Nayokathasala	Muay Thai 7see, Channel 7 Stadium	Bangkok, Thailand	Decision	5	3:00
Loses the Channel 7 Stadium Bantamweight (118 lbs) title.
2024-12-21	Loss	(Thailand) Khunsueklek Boomdeksian	Rajadamnern World Series, Rajadamnern Stadium	Bangkok, Thailand	Decision (Unanimous)	5	3:00
For the Rajadamnern Stadium Bantamweight (118 lbs) title.
2024-11-17	Win	(Thailand) Den Sitnayoktaweeptapong	Muay Thai 7see, Channel 7 Stadium	Bangkok, Thailand	Decision	5	3:00
2024-07-04	Win	(Thailand) Kumandoi Petchyindee Academy	Petchyindee + Kiatpetch, Rajadamnern Stadium	Bangkok, Thailand	Decision	5	3:00
2024-05-05	Win	(Thailand) Yokiree T.N.Muaythai	Muay Thai 7see, Channel 7 Stadium	Bangkok, Thailand	Decision	5	3:00
Wins the vacant Channel 7 Stadium Bantamweight (118 lbs) title.
2023-11-26	Win	(Thailand) JJ Or.Pimonsri	Muay Thai 7see, Channel 7 Stadium	Bangkok, Thailand	KO (Elbow)	4	
2023-10-01	Win	(Thailand) Amnatdet Sitnayokmote	Muay Thai 7see, Channel 7 Stadium	Bangkok, Thailand	Decision	5	3:00
2023-07-23	Draw	(Thailand) Amnatdet Sitnayokmote	Muay Thai 7see, Channel 7 Stadium	Bangkok, Thailand	Decision	5	3:00
2019-12-10	Loss	(Thailand) Petchphailin SorJor.TongPrachin	PK Saenchai + SorJor.TongPrachin, Lumpinee Stadium	Bangkok, Thailand	Decision	5	3:00
2019-11-05	Win	(Thailand) Samuenthep Por Petchsiri	Kiatpetch, Lumpinee Stadium	Bangkok, Thailand	KO	3	
2019-09-06	Win	(Thailand) Chusap Sor.Salacheep	Kiatpetch, Lumpinee Stadium	Bangkok, Thailand	KO	4	
2019-05-28	Loss	(Thailand) Seeui Singmawin	PK Saenchai + SorJor.TongPrachin, Lumpinee Stadium	Bangkok, Thailand	Decision	5	3:00
2019-03-26	Loss	(Thailand) Seeui Singmawin	Parunchai Birthday + Kiatpetch Super Fight	Thung Song District, Thailand	Decision	5	3:00
2019-03-03	Loss	(Thailand) PetchAmnat Sawansangmanja	Channel 7 Boxing Stadium	Bangkok, Thailand	Decision	5	3:00
2019-01-29	Win	(Thailand) Numtrangnoi Singpomprab	Kiatpetch, Lumpinee Stadium	Bangkok, Thailand	Decision	5	3:00
2018-12-11	Win	(Thailand) Chokploengrit Por.Lakboon	PKsaenchai, Lumpinee Stadium	Bangkok, Thailand	Decision	5	3:00
Wins the 1.5 million baht side-bet.
2018-11-09	Win	(Thailand) Robocop RadGoldGym	Petchkiatpetch, Lumpinee Stadium	Bangkok, Thailand	Decision	5	3:00
2018-10-19	Win	(Thailand) Patakpetch SinbiMuayThai	Petchkiatpetch, Lumpinee Stadium	Bangkok, Thailand	Decision	5	3:00
2018-09-07	Win	(Thailand) Seeui Singmawin	Kiatpetch, Lumpinee Stadium	Bangkok, Thailand	Decision	5	3:00
Wins Thailand Flyweight (112 lbs) title.
2018-06-29	Win	(Thailand) Nengern PKsaenchaimuaythaigym	PKsaenchai, Lumpinee Stadium	Bangkok, Thailand	Decision	5	3:00
2018-06-05	Win	(Thailand) Saenchainoi Thanaimichel	Kruekrai, Lumpinee Stadium	Bangkok, Thailand	Decision	5	3:00
Wins Lumpinee Stadium Light Flyweight (108 lbs) title.
2018-05-01	Win	(Thailand) Petchrungruang Odtuekdaeng	Kiatpetch, Lumpinee Stadium	Bangkok, Thailand	Decision	5	3:00
2018-03-28	Win	(Thailand) Hongkhao Erawan	WanParunchai + Poonseua Sanjorn	Nakhon Si Thammarat, Thailand	Decision	5	3:00
2018-03-04	Loss	(Thailand) Petchrungruang Odtuekdaeng	Channel 7 Boxing Stadium	Bangkok, Thailand	Decision	5	3:00
2018-01-20	Win	(Thailand) Grandprixnoi Sitnayokanong	Kiatpetch, Lumpinee Stadium	Bangkok, Thailand	Decision	5	3:00
2017-12-03	Loss	(Thailand) Taenchai SantiUbon	Muay7see, Channel 7 Boxing Stadium	Bangkok, Thailand	Decision	5	3:00
2017-11-02	Win	(Thailand) Tongpoon Sitpanuntchueng		Thailand	Decision	5	3:00
2017-09-16	Win	(Thailand) Kaoponglek Huarongnamkeng	Lumpine TKO, Lumpinee Stadium	Bangkok, Thailand	KO	3	
2017-08-08	Loss	(Thailand) Grandprixnoi Sitnayokanong	Eminent Air, Lumpinee Stadium	Bangkok, Thailand	Decision	5	3:00
2017-06-30	Loss	(Thailand) Taenchai SantiUbon	Kiatpetch, Lumpinee Stadium	Bangkok, Thailand	Decision	5	3:00
2017-06-06	Win	(Thailand) Faahkamram Petchpayatai	Petchkiatpetch, Lumpinee Stadium	Bangkok, Thailand	Decision	5	3:00
2017-05-09	Loss	(Thailand) Petchpanran BigMgym	Trakoonyang, Lumpinee Stadium	Bangkok, Thailand	Decision	5	3:00
2017-03-28	Win	(Thailand) Kowpong Por.Petchmanee	PK.Saenchai, Lumpinee Stadium	Bangkok, Thailand	Decision	5	3:00
2017-02-21	Win	(Thailand) Faahkamram Petchpayatai	Kiatpetch+Sitnumnoi, Lumpinee Stadium	Bangkok, Thailand	Decision	5	3:00
2017-01-15	Loss	(Thailand) Tapaokaew Singmawynn	Channel 7 Boxing Stadium	Bangkok, Thailand	Decision	5	3:00
2016-12-09	Loss	(Thailand) Kradooklek Kor.Klomkleaw	Lumpinee Stadium	Bangkok, Thailand	Decision	5	3:00
2016-11-15	Win	(Thailand) Saenchainoi Thanaimichel	Lumpinee Stadium	Bangkok, Thailand	Decision	5	3:00
2016-10-09	Loss	(Thailand) Saksit Kiatmoo9	Channel 7 Boxing Stadium	Bangkok, Thailand	Decision	5	3:00
2016-08-02	Win	(Thailand) Palangpup Phor.Muangphet	Lumpinee Stadium	Bangkok, Thailand	Decision	5	3:00
2016-06-28	Win	(Thailand) Saenchainoi Thanaimichel	Lumpinee Stadium	Bangkok, Thailand	Decision	5	3:00
2016-05-10	Win	(Thailand) Off Side Huarongnamkeng	Lumpinee Stadium	Bangkok, Thailand	Decision	5	3:00
2016-03-10	Loss	(Thailand) DT Lookbanmai	Rajadamnern Stadium	Bangkok, Thailand	Decision	5	3:00
2016-02-14	Win	(Thailand) DT Lookbanmai	Rangsit Stadium	Thailand	Decision	5	3:00
2016-01-03	Loss	(Thailand) Ninmangkon Or.SbayThae	Channel 7 Boxing Stadium	Bangkok, Thailand	Decision	5	3:00
2015-12-04	Loss	(Thailand) Komphetlek Adisorn	Lumpinee Stadium	Bangkok, Thailand	Decision	5	3:00
2016-10-13	Win	(Thailand) Yokkeeree T.N. Muaythai Gym	Lumpinee Stadium	Bangkok, Thailand	Decision	5	3:00
2015-09-14	Win	(Thailand) Phitakchai Sor.Kitichai	Rajadamnern Stadium	Bangkok, Thailand	Decision	5	3:00
2015-07-21	Win	(Thailand) Phitakchai Sor.Kitichai	Lumpinee Stadium	Bangkok, Thailand	Decision	5	3:00
2015-06-19	Loss	(Thailand) Phitakchai Sor.Kitichai	Lumpinee Stadium	Bangkok, Thailand	Decision	5	3:00
2015-05-10	Loss	(Thailand) Tai Parunchai	Jitmuangnon Stadium	Thailand	Decision	5	3:00
2016-02-16	Loss	(Thailand) Theppratan Phetsitong	Rajadamnern Stadium	Bangkok, Thailand	Decision	5	3:00
2015-11-24	Win	(Thailand) Tongsiam Lukmahata	Rajadamnern Stadium	Bangkok, Thailand	Decision	5	3:00
2014-08-15	Win	(Thailand) Petchthailand Moopingaroijung		Maha Sarakham, Thailand	Decision	5	3:00
Legend: Win Loss Draw/No contest Notes
