= Khunsueklek Boomdeksian =

Thai professional Muay Thai fighter

- Born: Tichakorn Sripromma; June 7, 2005 (age 21); Nong Kung Si, Khon Kaen, Thailand
- Native name: ทิชากร ศรีพรมมา
- Other names: Khunsuklek UFABoomdeksien (ขุนศึกเล็ก ยูฟ่าบูมเด็กเซียน)
- Height: 1.68 m (5 ft 6 in)
- Division: Light Flyweight; Flyweight; Super Flyweight; Bantamweight; Super Bantamweight
- Reach: 1.62 m (64 in)
- Style: Muay Thai (Muay Femur)
- Stance: Orthodox
- Fighting out of: Bangkok, Thailand
- Team: Boomdeksien; Sor.Sangthai
- Trainer: Kriengkrai Wansuep
- Years active: c. 2014–present

Professional boxing record
- Total: 1
- Losses: 1
- By knockout: 1

Kickboxing record
- Total: 99
- Wins: 87
- Losses: 9
- By knockout: 1
- Draws: 3

Other information
- Notable relatives: Khunsueknoi Boomdeksian (twin brother)
- Boxing record from BoxRec

Tichakorn Sripromma (Thai: ทิชากร ศรีพรมมา; born June 6, 2005), known professionally as Khunsueklek Boomdeksian (Thai: ขุนศึกเล็ก บูมเด็กเซียน) is a Thai professional Muay Thai fighter. He is a former two-time Rajadamnern Stadium Bantamweight Champion and the 2024 Sports Writers Association of Thailand Fighter of the Year.

As of November 2024, he is No. 6 in Combat Press' men's pound-for-pound rankings for Muay Thai.

== Career ==
Khunsueklek started training in Muay Thai at the age of nine alongside his twin brother Khunsuknoy. After about twenty fights the brothers were brought to the Boomdeksien camp.

On February 10, 2019, Khunsueklek defeated Kalong Tor. Kutnamsai by decision in the Khon Kaen province. This marked the beginning of an extended undefeated streak lasting multiple years at the beginning of his Bangkok career.

On September 3, 2022, Khunsueklek defeated Dejpichai NavyAndaman by decision to capture the Omnoi Stadium 118 lbs title.

On December 24, 2022, Khunsueklek challenged Dinnuathong Muadphong191 for his Thailand 115 lbs title at an exceptional event co promoted by the Boxing Association of Thailand, the IFMA, the Sports Authority of Thailand and the National Sports Development Fund Office. He won the fight by decision.

On January 20, 2023, Khunsueklek participated in the inaugural ONE Friday Fights event where he faced Petchbanrai Singmawynn. He won the fight by unanimous decision. Following this victory he was ranked No. 1 at 112 lbs by the WMO.

For his results during the year 2022 Khunsueklek was elected Rising Fighter of the Year by the Sports Writers Association of Thailand.

Khunsueklek was matched with Koko Sor. Sommai at ONE Friday Fights 6 on February 24, 2023. He won the fight by split decision. As of April 2023, he was ranked as the second best 115 lbs muay thai fighter in the world by the WMO.

Khunsueklek rematched Koko at ONE Friday Fights 14 on April 28, 2023. He won the fight by unanimous decision, pushing his undefeated streak to 36 fights in a row. Following this success he was ranked as the best 115 lbs muay thai fighter in the world by Combat Press.

Despite his success in ONE Championship Khunsueklek's camp estimated that his style was not best suited for ONE and that he should aim to go back to five rounds stadium fights. As of May 2023, he was ranked as a top ten pound-for-pound fighter by the WMO.

Khunsueklek challenged Kumandoi Petchyindee Academy for the Rajadamnern Stadium Bantamweight (118 lbs) title on April 6, 2024. He won the fight by unanimous decision.

Khunsueklek made his first Rajadamnern Stadium Bantamweight (118 lbs) title defense against Petchsiam Jor.Pattreya on May 11, 2024. He won the fight by a third-round knockout. Aside from retaining the belt, he was awarded 1 million baht in prize money.

Khunsueklek made his second Rajadamnern Stadium Bantamweight (118 lbs) title defense against Ryuki Matsuda on July 14, 2024. He lost the fight by an upset second-round knockout with a right cross. He had a six-year unbeaten record in Muay Thai from 2019 to July 2024 with 41 wins and 1 draw. The pair fought a rematch on September 21, 2024. Khunsueklek won the fight by unanimous decision and was once again awarded 1 million baht in prize money.

Khunsueklek made the first defense of his second title reign against Kevin Martinez on November 16, 2024. He won the title by unanimous decision. Former Lumpinee Stadium champion Wanchainoi Sitsarawatseur called for a fight with Khunsueklek following this victory and the bout was scheduled to take place a month later, on December 21, 2024. Khunsueklek retained the title by unanimous decision and was awarded 750,000 baht in prize money.

Khunsueklek faced Leandro Douglas on March 22, 2025. He won the fight by unanimous decision.

Khunsueklek successfully defended his Rajadamnern Stadium Bantamweight title for the third time on May 24, 2025, when he knocked out Nuapayak Wor.Sangprapai with elbows in the third round on Rajadamnern World Series.

Khunsueklek vacated the Rajadamnern Stadium Bantamweight title after failing to make weight for a title defense on July 11, 2025.

== Titles and accomplishments ==
- Siam Omnoi Stadium
  - 2022 Omnoi Stadium Bantamweight (118 lbs) Champion
- Professional Boxing Association of Thailand (PAT)
  - 2022 Thailand Super Flyweight (115 lbs) Champion
  - 2023 Thailand Bantamweight (118 lbs) Champion
    - One successful title defense
- Rajadamnern Stadium
  - 2024 Rajadamnern Stadium Bantamweight (118 lbs) Champion
    - One successful title defense
  - 2024 Rajadamnern Stadium Bantamweight (118 lbs) Champion
    - Three successful title defenses
  - 2024 Rajadamnern Stadium Fighter of the Year

Awards

- 2022 Sports Writers Association of Thailand Young Fighter of the Year
- 2024 Sports Authority of Thailand Fighter of the Year
- 2024 Sports Writers Association of Thailand Fighter of the Year

== Muay Thai record ==
Muay Thai Record
87 Wins, 7 Losses, 3 Draws
Date	Result	Opponent	Event	Location	Method	Round	Time
2026-12-19		(Thailand) Tapnar YuttakarnMuayThai	Rajadamnern World Series, Rajadamnern Stadium	Bangkok, Thailand			
For the vacant Rajadamnern Stadium Super Bantamweight (122 lbs) title.
2026-10-17	Win	(Thailand) Petchsamarn Sor.Samarngarment	Rajadamnern World Series	Bangkok, Thailand	Decision (Unanimous)	3	3:00
2026-08-15	Win	(Iran) Peyman Zolfaghari	Rajadamnern World Series	Bangkok, Thailand	Decision (Unanimous)	3	3:00
2025-09-27	Win	(Thailand) Seeoui Singmawin	Rajadamnern World Series	Bangkok, Thailand	Decision (Unanimous)	3	3:00
2025-08-16	Win	(Thailand) Yokmorakot Wor.Sangprapai	Rajadamnern World Series	Bangkok, Thailand	Decision (Unanimous)	3	3:00
2025-05-24	Win	(Thailand) Nuapayak Wor.Sangprapai	Rajadamnern World Series, Rajadamnern Stadium	Bangkok, Thailand	KO (Elbows)	3	2:00
Defends the Rajadamnern Stadium Bantamweight (118 lbs) title.
2025-03-22	Win	(Brazil) Leandro Douglas	Rajadamnern World Series, Rajadamnern Stadium	Bangkok, Thailand	Decision (Unanimous)	3	3:00
2024-12-21	Win	(Thailand) Wanchainoi Sitsarawatseur	Rajadamnern World Series, Rajadamnern Stadium	Bangkok, Thailand	Decision (Unanimous)	5	3:00
Defends the Rajadamnern Stadium Bantamweight (118 lbs) title.
2024-11-16	Win	(Spain) Kevin Martinez	Rajadamnern World Series, Rajadamnern Stadium	Bangkok, Thailand	Decision (Unanimous)	5	3:00
Defends the Rajadamnern Stadium Bantamweight (118 lbs) title.
2024-09-21	Win	(Japan) Ryuki Matsuda	Rajadamnern World Series, Rajadamnern Stadium	Bangkok, Thailand	Decision (Unanimous)	5	3:00
Wins the Rajadamnern Stadium Bantamweight (118 lbs) title.
2024-07-14	Loss	(Japan) Ryuki Matsuda	Rajadamnern World Series Japan	Chiba, Japan	KO (Right cross)	2	2:41
Loses the Rajadamnern Stadium Bantamweight (118 lbs) title.
2024-05-11	Win	(Thailand) Petchsiam Jor.Pattreya	Rajadamnern World Series	Bangkok, Thailand	KO (Left high kick)	3	0:32
Defends the Rajadamnern Stadium Bantamweight (118 lbs) title.
2024-04-06	Win	(Thailand) Kumandoi Petchyindee Academy	Rajadamnern World Series	Bangkok, Thailand	Decision (Unanimous)	5	5:00
Wins the Rajadamnern Stadium Bantamweight (118 lbs) title.
2024-01-29	Win	(Thailand) Paeyim Sor.Boonmeerit	Muay Thai Pantamit, Thupatemi Stadium	Pathum Thani province, Thailand	Decision	5	5:00
Defends the Thailand Bantamweight (118 lbs) title.
2023-09-11	Win	(Thailand) Han Petchkiatpetch	Sor.Sommai Birthday, Thupatemi Stadium	Pathum Thani province, Thailand	KO (Elbow)	2	1:25
Wins the vacant Thailand Bantamweight (118 lbs) title.
2023-08-09	Win	(Thailand) Pangtor Por.Lakboon	Rajadamnern Ruamjai Puan Faen Muay, Rajadamnern Stadium	Bangkok, Thailand	Decision	5	3:00
2023-04-28	Win	(Thailand) Koko Sor.Sommai	ONE Friday Fights 14, Lumpinee Stadium	Bangkok, Thailand	Decision (Unanimous)	3	3:00
2023-02-24	Win	(Thailand) Koko Sor.Sommai	ONE Friday Fights 6, Lumpinee Stadium	Bangkok, Thailand	Decision (Split)	3	3:00
2023-01-20	Win	(Thailand) Petchbanrai Singmawynn	ONE Friday Fights 1, Lumpinee Stadium	Bangkok, Thailand	Decision (Unanimous)	3	5:00
2022-12-24	Win	(Thailand) Dinnuathong Muadphong191	Mathupum Muay Thai	Ratchaburi province, Thailand	Decision	5	5:00
Wins the Thailand Super Flyweight (115 lbs) title.
2022-11-21	Win	(Thailand) Ployrungpetch RambutaBangKapi	Muay Thai Panthamit, Thupatemi Stadium	Pathum Thani, Thailand	KO (Right elbow)	3	1:23
2022-10-22	Win	(Thailand) Nuathoranee Jitmuangnon	Suek Ruamponkon Meephuen	Samut Sakhon, Thailand	KO (Left elbow)	3	
2022-09-03	Win	(Thailand) Dejpichai NavyAndaman	Suek Jao Muay Thai, Omnoi Stadium	Samut Sakhon, Thailand	Decision	5	5:00
Wins the Omnoi Stadium Bantamweight (118 lbs) title.
2022-07-18	Win	(Thailand) Yakpanlan NuisimumMuang	Muay Thai Panthamit, Thupatemi Stadium	Pathum Thani, Thailand	Decision	5	3:00
2022-06-22	Win	(Thailand) Seksit Chor. KaewWiset	Muay Thai Panthamit	Chiang Mai, Thailand	Decision	5	3:00
2022-05-28	Win	(Thailand) Chen Jitmuangnon	Jitmuangnon, Or.Tor. Gor3 Stadium	Nonthaburi province, Thailand	Decision	5	3:00
2022-03-11	Win	(Thailand) Phetnipol Sak Chor. RorBor	Phittaktham	Songkhla province, Thailand	Decision	5	3:00
2022-01-15	Win	(Thailand) Kaoklai Sor. Wangsuea	Suek Jao Muay Thai, Omnoi Stadium	Samut Sakhon, Thailand	KO (Low kick)	1	
2021-12-27	Win	(Thailand) Chalamdam Wor. Auracha	Pumpanmuang + Sialamdeksian	Chonburi province, Thailand	KO	2	
2021-09-25	Win	(Thailand) Phettongkam Tor. Morsri	Suek Jao Muay Thai, Omnoi Stadium	Samut Sakhon, Thailand	Decision	5	3:00
2021-03-17	Win	(Thailand) Venum Lakkibantheung	Sor. Thanapol, Rajadamnern Stadium	Bangkok, Thailand	KO	4	
2021-	Win	(Thailand) Petchaisaeng Phetcharoenwit		Maha Sarakham province, Thailand	KO	3	
2020-10-30	Win	(Thailand) Phayaphueng UngUbon	Rangsit Stadium	Pathum Thani, Thailand	Decision	5	3:00
2020-07-22	Win	(Thailand) Petchpanrit ThongmeldaMall	Rajadamnern Stadium	Bangkok, Thailand	KO	3	
2020-	Win	(Thailand) Jamessak Phetsomnuek		Khon Kaen province, Thailand	KO	2	
2020-02-01	Win	(Thailand) Petchsiam Jor.Pattreya		Nakhon Ratchasima province, Thailand	Decision	5	3:00
2020-01-20	Win	(Thailand) Phetbankhok Detpetchthong		Roi Et province, Thailand	Decision	5	3:00
2019-12-26	Win	(Thailand) Lukchangkru Tombuakhao		Roi Et province, Thailand	Decision	5	3:00
2019-11-	Win	Kaptantim Sit Thailand		Udon Thani province, Thailand	Decision	5	3:00
2019-10-19	Win	(Thailand) Charoenphet Sor. Pratumchai		Loei province, Thailand	KO	2	
2019-10-09	Win	(Thailand) Satangthong Petchnongbua		Nakhon Ratchasima province, Thailand	Decision	5	3:00
2019-10-01	Win	(Thailand) Khaosainoi TambonMorsi	Suranaree Camp Boxing Stadium	Nakhon Ratchasima province, Thailand	KO	4	
2019-09-09	Draw	(Thailand) Satangthong Petchnongbua		Roi Et province, Thailand	Decision	5	3:00
2019-08-10	Win	(Thailand) Nongbiew Sitpa-O		Khon Kaen province, Thailand	Decision	5	3:00
2019-07-	Win	(Thailand) Nuapayak SamyodResort		Nakhon Ratchasima province, Thailand	Decision	5	3:00
2019-06-01	Win	(Thailand) Samersing Lukchaopholuangwang		Roi Et province, Thailand	Decision	5	3:00
2019-05-24	Win	(Thailand) Petchsiam Jor.Pattreya		Maha Sarakham province, Thailand	Decision	5	3:00
2019-04-	Win	(Thailand) Petchphanom Lookchaoporkumphanat		Udon Thani province, Thailand	Decision	5	3:00
2019-04-02	Win	(Thailand) Lukkrao Phetsomsak		Nakhon Ratchasima province, Thailand	Decision	5	3:00
2019-03-14	Win	(Thailand) Petchphanom Lookchaoporkumphanat		Nong Bua Lamphu province, Thailand	Decision	5	3:00
2019-02-22	Win	(Thailand) Nuasaenchai Sor. Khamsawan		Maha Sarakham province, Thailand	Decision	5	3:00
2019-02-10	Win	(Thailand) Kalong Tor. Kutnamsai		Khon Kaen province, Thailand	Decision	5	3:00
2018	Loss	(Thailand) Peck PTT.Thongtawee		Thailand	Decision	5	2:00
Legend: Win Loss Draw/No contest Notes

== Boxing record ==
1 fight	0 wins	1 loss
By knockout	0	1

No.	Result	Record	Opponent	Type	Round, time	Date	Location	Notes
1	Loss	0–1	Suriya Kraimanee	KO	1 (6)	2 Oct 2021	Khao Kradong Stadium, Buriram, Thailand	
