= Ryuki Matsuda =

Japanese kickboxer (born 2005)

- Born: 松田 龍聖; December 19, 2005 (age 20); Kyoto, Japan
- Height: 165 cm (5 ft 5 in)
- Division: Bantamweight
- Style: Kickboxing; Karate
- Stance: Orthodox
- Fighting out of: Kyoto, Japan
- Team: Ohara Dojo
- Years active: 2021 - present

Kickboxing record
- Total: 19
- Wins: 15
- By knockout: 5
- Losses: 3
- Draws: 1

Ryuki Matsuda (Japanese: 松田 龍聖, Matsuda Ryuki; born December 19, 2005) is a Japanese kickboxer. He is a former Rajadamnern Stadium Bantamweight Champion.

As of October 2024, he is the #6 ranked -53 kg kickboxer in the world by Beyond Kick.

== Career ==
=== Early career ===
Matsuda made his professional debut at NJKF 2021 west 3rd on August 8, 2021, where he defeated Atsuya Manabe by unanimous decision. On December 5, 2021, Matsuda scored his first professional knockout when he landed a flying knee in the second round against Takanori Nakajima at NJKF West Kyoto Wild West.

Matsuda stopped Shota Haneda in the first round of their fight at HOOST CUP NAGOYA 11 after scoring three knockdowns on July 10, 2022.

On March 27, 2022, Matsuda defeated Yamato Nakajima by unanimous decision at HOOST CUP KINGS KYOTO 9 〜REVERSAL〜.

On October 16, 2022, Matsuda faced King Takeshi at HOOST CUP KINGS KYOTO 10. He won the fight by unanimous decision. On December 18, 2022, Matsuda knocked out former Thailand champion Thanadet Tor.Pran49 with a right cross in the second round at HOOST CUP KINGS NAGOYA 12.

=== HOOST CUP champion ===
Matsuda challenged Koudai for his HOOST CUP -53 kg title at HOOST CUP KINGS KYOTO 11 on March 5, 2023. He won the fight by unanimous decision, with two scorecards of 50–46 and one scorecard of 50–47. Matsuda scored a knock down with a left hook in the fourth round. He broke his right hand during the fight.

Matsuda faced Koki Yamada in a non-title bout at HOOST CUP KINGS KYOTO 12 on October 29, 2023. He won the fight by unanimous decision, with scores of 30–29, 30–29 and 30–28.

Matsuda faced Ritikrai Kaewsamrit at HOOST CUP KINGS NAGOYA 14 on December 10, 2023. He won the fight by a first-round knockout.

Matsuda faced Issei Ishii at a Rajadamnern World Series Japan on April 14, 2024.

Matsuda challenged Khunsueklek Boomdeksian for the Rajadamnern Stadium Bantamweight (118 lbs) title at a Rajadamnern World Series Japan on July 14, 2024. He won the fight by a second-round knockout with a right cross.

Matsuda faced Kohtao Petsomnuk at Rajadamnern World Series Japan on December 1, 2024.

On May 11, 2025, Matsuda defeated Sheng Yizhuo by unanimous decision after scoring a knockdown in the second round at BOM x Space One Japan.

== Titles and accomplishments ==
=== Professional ===
- HOOST CUP
  - 2023 Hoost Cup Super Flyweight (-53 kg) Champion
- Rajadamnern Stadium
  - 2024 Rajadamnern Stadium Bantamweight (118 lbs) Champion

=== Amateur ===
- All Japan Jr. Kick
  - 2014 All Japan Jr Kick -25 kg Champion
- All Japan Glove Karate Federation
  - 3x All Japan Glove Karate Elementary School Champion (2015, 2016, 2017)
  - 2020 All Japan Glove Karate Middle School Middleweight Runner-up
- DEEP KICK
  - 2016 NEXT LEVEL Kansai TOP RUN -30 kg Champion
  - 2020 NEXT LEVEL Kansai TOP RUN -55 kg Champion
  - 2021 NEXT LEVEL All Japan Junior -55 kg Champion
- Green Boy Fight
  - 2016 Green Boy Fight Super Bantamweight Champion
  - 2016 Green Boy Fight Super Featherweight Champion
  - 2019 Green Boy Fight -45 kg Champion
- WBC Muaythai
  - 2017 All Japan WBC Muay Thai Jr League Elementary School -34 kg Champion
- Kyoken Jr. Kick
  - 2017 Kyoken Junior Kick -35 kg Champion
- Peter Aerts Spirit
  - 2018 All Japan Peter Aerts Spirit U-12 -43 kg Champion & Event MVP
- International Sport Karate Association
  - 2019 ISKA All Japan Kickboxing Middle School -55 kg Champion & Event MVP

Awards

- eFight.jp
  - Fighter of the Month (July 2024)

== Fight record ==
Muay Thai & Kickboxing record
15 Wins (5 (T)KO's), 3 Losses, 1 Draw, 0 No Contest
Date	Result	Opponent	Event	Location	Method	Round	Time
2026-10-25	Win	(Japan) Kazuki Miburo	GOAT Kickboxing Fes. 3	Tokyo, Japan	Decision (Unanimous)	3	3:00
2026-03-06	Loss	(Thailand) Singdam Kafaefocus	ONE Friday Fights 145, Lumpinee Stadium	Bangkok, Thailand	Decision (Unanimous)	3	3:00
2025-10-24	Loss	(Thailand) Petchsiam Jor.Pattreya	ONE Friday Fights 130, Lumpinee Stadium	Bangkok, Thailand	Decision (Unanimous)	3	3:00
2025-05-11	Win	(China) Sheng Yizhuo	BOM x Space One Japan	Tokyo, Japan	Decision (Unanimous)	3	3:00
2024-12-01	Win	(Thailand) Kohtao Petsomnuk	Rajadamnern World Series Japan	Yokohama, Japan	Decision (Unanimous)	3	3:00
2024-09-21	Loss	(Thailand) Khunsueklek Boomdeksian	Rajadamnern World Series, Rajadamnern Stadium	Bangkok, Thailand	Decision (Unanimous)	5	3:00
Loses the Rajadamnern Stadium Bantamweight (118 lbs) title.
2024-07-14	Win	(Thailand) Khunsueklek Boomdeksian	Rajadamnern World Series Japan	Chiba, Japan	KO (Right cross)	2	2:41
Wins the Rajadamnern Stadium Bantamweight (118 lbs) title.
2024-04-14	Draw	(Japan) Issei Ishii	Rajadamnern World Series Japan	Chiba, Japan	Decision (Unanimous)	3	3:00
2023-12-10	Win	(Thailand) Ritikrai Kaewsamrit	HOOST CUP KINGS NAGOYA 14	Nagoya, Japan	KO (Body punches)	1	1:07
2023-10-29	Win	(Japan) Koki Yamada	HOOST CUP KINGS KYOTO 12	Kyoto, Japan	Decision (Unanimous)	3	3:00
2023-07-23	Win	(Thailand) Niroj Sor.Boonmeerit	HOOST CUP KINGS NAGOYA 13	Nagoya, Japan	Decision (Unanimous)	3	3:00
2023-03-05	Win	(Japan) Koudai	HOOST CUP KINGS KYOTO 11	Kyoto, Japan	Decision (Unanimous)	5	3:00
Wins the HOOST CUP -53kg title.
2022-12-18	Win	(Thailand) Thanadet Tor.Pran49	HOOST CUP KINGS NAGOYA 12	Nagoya, Japan	KO (Right cross)	2	
2022-10-16	Win	(Japan) KING Takeshi	HOOST CUP KINGS KYOTO 10	Kyoto, Japan	Decision (Unanimous)	3	3:00
2022-07-10	Win	(Japan) Shota Haneda	HOOST CUP KINGS NAGOYA 11	Nagoya, Japan	TKO (3 Knockdowns)	1	1:58
2022-03-27	Win	(Japan) Yamato Nakajima	HOOST CUP KINGS KYOTO 9 〜REVERSAL〜	Kyoto, Japan	Decision (Unanimous)	3	3:00
2021-12-05	Win	(Japan) Takanori Nakajima	NJKF West Kyoto Wild West	Kyoto, Japan	TKO (Flying knee)	2	1:17
2021-10-17	Win	(Japan) Ryoto	HOOST CUP KINGS KYOTO 8	Kyoto, Japan	Decision (Unanimous)	3	3:00
2021-08-08	Win	(Japan) Atsuya Manabe	NJKF 2021 west 3rd	Osaka, Japan	Decision (Unanimous)	3	3:00
Legend: Win Loss Draw/No contest Notes

=== Amateur record ===
Amateur Kickboxing record
Date	Result	Opponent	Event	Location	Method	Round	Time
2021-03-07	Win	(Japan) Yasuhito Fujimoto	HOOST CUP KINGS KYOTO 7	Kyoto, Japan	Decision (unanimous)	3	3:00
2021-02-21	Win	(Japan) Taishi Shimizu	NJKF 2021 west 1st	Osaka, Japan	Decision (unanimous)	3	1:30
Wins NEXT LEVEL All Japan Junior -55kg title.
2020-11-22	Win	(Japan) Toki Harada	NJKF 2020 west 4th	Osaka, Japan	Decision (unanimous)	3	1:30
Wins TOP RUN -55kg title.
2020-10-18	Win	(Japan) Wataru Okamoto	HOOST CUP KINGS OSAKA 5	Osaka, Japan	Decision (unanimous)	2	2:00
2020-10-18	Win	(Japan) Fumito Nakada	NEXT LEVEL Kansai 67	Osaka, Japan	Decision (unanimous)	2	1:30
2020-07-19	Win	(Japan) Naruto Matsumoto	NEXT LEVEL Kansai 65	Osaka, Japan	Decision (unanimous)	2	1:30
2020-03-01	Win	(Japan) Riku Otsu	HOOST CUP KINGS KYOTO 6	Kyoto, Japan	Decision (unanimous)	3	2:00
2020-02-09	Win	(Japan) Ryomu Endo	K-GATE 25	Japan	Decision	2	2:00
2019-12-01	Win	(Japan) Renon Hoya	1st ISKA All Japan Open Amateur Kickboxing Championship, Final	Yokohama, Japan	Decision	3	2:00
Wins ISKA All Japan Middle School -55kg title.
2019-12-01	Win	(Japan) Ryuto Ota	1st ISKA All Japan Open Amateur Kickboxing Championship, Semi Final	Yokohama, Japan			
2019-10-06	Win	(Japan)	Suk Wanchai Muay Thai Super Fight	Nagoya, Japan	Decision		
2019-09-29	Win	(Japan) Koki Kimura	HOOST CUP Challenge 9 - All Japan Amateur Kickboxing	Nagoya, Japan	Decision	2	2:00
2019-08-15	Loss	(Thailand) Piewpong Kiatsongrit	Warriors Rising	Thailand			
2019-07-14	Win	(Japan) Ibuki Yamauchi	K's Cup	Tokyo, Japan	Decision	2	2:00
2019-06-01	Win	(Japan)	NKB Amateur	Japan	Decision		
2019-03-24	Win	(Japan) Yuto Yamane	Green Boy Fight	Japan	Decision	2	1:30
Wins Green Boy Fight -45kg title.
2019-03-03	Win	(Japan) Tesshin Terasaka	HOOST CUP KINGS Kyoto 5	Kyoto, Japan	Decision	2	2:00
2018-12-09	Win	(Japan) Koki	BRAVE 6	Tokyo, Japan	Decision	2	2:00
2018-12-02	Win	(Japan) Kaito Matsumoto	2018 All Japan Peter Aerts Spirit Championship, Final	Tokyo, Japan	Decision (unanimous)		
Wins All Japan Peter Aerts Spirit U-12 -43kg title.
2018-12-02	Win	(Japan) Toguchi	2018 All Japan Peter Aerts Spirit Championship, Semi Final	Tokyo, Japan	Decision (unanimous)		
2018-10-05	Win	(Thailand)		Thailand	KO		
2018-09-23	Win	(Japan) Hayato Kai	Muay Lok Challenge 2018	Tokyo, Japan	Decision	3	2:00
2018-07-15	Win	(Japan) Kyosuke Yokoyama	Peter Aerts Spirit Kansai Selection, Final	Osaka, Japan	TKO		
2018-07-15	Win	(Japan) Yamazaki	Peter Aerts Spirit Kansai Selection, Semi Final	Osaka, Japan	Decision (unanimous)		
2018-05-13	Loss	(Japan) Shimon Yoshinari	1st WMC Japan Amateur, -40 kg Tournament Final	Tokyo, Japan	Decision	2	2:00
For the WMC Japan Amateur -40kg title.
2018-04-29	Win	(Japan) Erai Takahashi	NEXT LEVEL Kansai 46	Sakai, Japan	Decision (unanimous)	2	2:00
2018-04-29	Win	(Japan) Manaka Shimizu	NEXT LEVEL Kansai 46	Sakai, Japan	TKO	1	
2018-03-21	Win	(Japan) Rinnosuke Shimizu	NEXT LEVEL Kansai 45	Osaka, Japan	Decision (majority)	2	2:00
2018-02-12	Loss	(Japan) Hiroto Hayashi	NEXT LEVEL Kansai 44	Osaka, Japan	Decision (unanimous)	2	2:00
2017-12-23	Win	(Japan) Toki Terada	NEXT LEVEL Kansai 43	Sakai, Japan	TKO	2	1:50
2017-11-23	Win	(Japan) Haji Yoshida	Kyoken Junior Kick	Osaka, Japan			
Wins Kyoken Junior Kick -35kg title.
2017-09-24	Loss	(Japan) Hiroto Hayashi	NEXT LEVEL Kansai 41	Sakai, Japan	Decision (split)	2	2:00
2017-08-20	Win	(Japan) Ryuichi Yoshida	K-GATE 18	Japan	Decision	2	2:00
2017-08-07	Win	(Japan) Takara Sozaki	WBC Muay Thai Jr League, Final	Tokyo, Japan	Decision (split)	2	1:30
Wins WBC Muay Thai Jr League U-15 -34kg title.
2017-08-07	Win	(Japan) Aiki Ooshika	WBC Muay Thai Jr League, Semi Final	Tokyo, Japan	Decision	2	1:30
2017-07-30	Win	(Japan) Taku Kitano	NEXT LEVEL Kansai 40	Sakai, Japan	Decision (unanimous)	2	2:00
2017-07-09	Win	(Japan) Momu Tsukamoto	NEXT LEVEL Chushikoku 25	Okayama, Japan	Decision (unanimous)	2	2:00
2017-06-10	Loss	(Japan) Naruto Matsumoto	Green Boy Fight Belt Tournament, Semi Final	Kyoto, Japan	Decision	2	1:30
2017-05-28	Loss	(Japan) Toki Harada	NEXT LEVEL Kansai 39	Sakai, Japan	Decision (split)	2	2:00
2017-05-21	Loss	(Japan) Sento Ito	MuayThai Super Fight Suk Wan Kingtong West Japan Tournament, Semi Final	Kyoto, Japan	Decision		
2017-04-30	Win	(Japan) Akito Kinoshita	NEXT LEVEL Kansai 38	Osaka, Japan	Decision (unanimous)	2	2:00
2017-04-20	Win	(Japan) Momo Shimizu	Dream Stage IX	Japan	Decision		
2017-03-26		(Japan) Takumi Yoshimura	MFC DREAM FIGHT Vol.2 - FIGHT FOR DREAM	Osaka, Japan			
2017-03-19	Draw	(Japan) Taishi Fukunaga	NEXT LEVEL Kansai 37	Sakai, Japan	Decision (unanimous)	2	2:00
2017-02-26	Win	(Japan) Ryuto Nishida	Green Boy Super Fight 12	Kameoka, Japan	KO	1	0:45
2017-01-29	Win	(Japan) Saion Ota	NEXT LEVEL Kansai 36	Sakai, Japan	Decision (unanimous)	2	2:00
2017-01-15	Win	(Japan) Yamato Inoue	K-GATE 17	Japan	Decision	2	2:00
2016-12-23	Win	(Japan) Toki Harada	NEXT LEVEL Kansai 35	Osaka, Japan	Decision (unanimous)	2	2:00
2016-11-03	Win	(Japan) Teru Sugiura	DEEP☆KICK 31	Osaka, Japan	Decision (unanimous)	3	2:00
Wins TOP RUN -30kg title.
2016-09-22	Win	(Japan) Taisei Nakano	NEXT LEVEL Kansai 33 - Next Challenger Tournament, Final	Sakai, Japan	Decision (majority)	2	2:00
2016-09-22	Win	(Japan) Takara Sozaki	NEXT LEVEL Kansai 33 - Next Challenger Tournament, Semi Final	Sakai, Japan	Decision (unanimous)	2	2:00
2016-09-18	Draw	(Japan) Takeyama	K-GATE 16	Japan	Decision	2	2:00
2016-09-18	Win	(Japan) Mitsui	K-GATE 16	Japan	Decision	2	2:00
2016-08-21	Draw	(Japan) Sento Ito	NEXT LEVEL Kansai 32	Sakai, Japan	Decision	2	2:00
2016-07-10	Win	(Japan)	Green Boy Fight Belt Tournament, Final	Kyoto, Japan	Decision		
Wins Green Boy Fight Featherweight title.
2016-07-10	Win	(Japan) Kinoshita	Green Boy Fight Belt Tournament, Semi Final	Kyoto, Japan			
2016-07-03	Loss	(Japan) Ryuta Suekuni	NEXT LEVEL Kansai 31	Sakai, Japan	Decision (split)	2	2:00
2016-06-19	Win	(Japan)	MuayThai Super Fight Suk Wan Kingtong	Kyoto, Japan	KO		
2016-05-29	Win	(Japan) Seita Yoshioka	NEXT LEVEL Kansai 30	Osaka, Japan	Decision (unanimous)	2	2:00
2016-04-29	Win	(Japan) Kirari Fujino	NEXT LEVEL Kansai 29	Sakai, Japan	Decision (unanimous)	2	2:00
2016-03-21	Win	(Japan)	Green Boy Fight Belt Tournament, Final	Kyoto, Japan	Decision	2	1:30
Wins Green Boy Fight Super Bantamweight title.
2016-03-20	Win	(Japan) Taki Sekimoto	NEXT LEVEL Kansai 28	Sakai, Japan	Decision (unanimous)	2	2:00
2016-03-13	Loss	(Japan) Yosuke Uchida	Muay Thai Super Fight Suk Wan Kingtong - Real Champion Tournament Final	Tokyo, Japan	Decision		
For the Real Champion Tournament -30kg title.
2016-03-13	Win	(Japan)	Muay Thai Super Fight Suk Wan Kingtong - Real Champion Tournament Semi Final	Tokyo, Japan	KO		
2016-03-06	Win	(Japan) Hiroto Yamazaki	K-GATE 15	Japan	Decision	2	2:00
2016-01-31	Loss	(Japan) Kanta Kimura	NEXT LEVEL Kansai 27	Sakai, Japan	Decision (unanimous)	2	2:00
2015-12-27	Win	(Japan) Toki Harada	NEXT LEVEL Kansai 26	Sakai, Japan	Decision (unanimous)	2	2:00
2015-11-22	Win	(Japan) Ai Takao	Kyoken Junior Kick 17	Osaka, Japan	Decision	2	2:00
2015-11-15	Win	(Japan) Sena Ohno	NEXT LEVEL Kansai 25	Sakai, Japan	TKO	2	
2015-09-08	Win	(Japan) Toranosuke Nanba	K-GATE 10	Japan	Decision	2	1:30
2015-06-14	Win	(Japan) Masaya Toyokawa	NEXT LEVEL Kansai 23	Sakai, Japan	Decision (split)	2	2:00
2015-05-19	Loss	(Japan) Teru Sugiura	K-GATE 9	Japan	Decision	2	1:30
2015-04-26	Win	(Japan) Sho Tsukamoto	NEXT LEVEL Kansai 22	Sakai, Japan	Decision (split)	2	2:00
2015-03-21	Win	(Japan) Fuwa Okamoto	NEXT LEVEL Kansai 21	Sakai, Japan	Decision (majority)	2	2:00
2015-02-08	Win	(Japan) Sento Ito	NEXT LEVEL Kansai 20	Sakai, Japan	Decision (split)	2	2:00
2014-03-30	Win	(Japan) Momu Tsukamoto	2014 All Japan Jr Kick, Final	Japan	Decision	2	2:00
Wins All Japan Jr Kick -25kg title.
Legend: Win Loss Draw/No contest Notes

== See also ==
- List of male kickboxers
