= Chalamdam Nayokathasala =

Thai Muay Thai fighter

- Born: 2004 (age 21–22); Nakhon Si Thammarat province, Thailand
- Other names: Kasikorn NayokAthasala (กสิกร นายกเอท่าศาลา)
- Height: 166 cm (5 ft 5 in)
- Division: Super Bantamweight
- Style: Muay Thai (Muay Femur)
- Stance: Orthodox
- Fighting out of: Tha Sala district, Thailand
- Team: Sor Chokmeechai
- Trainer: Rochad Thepwarin

Chalamdam Nayokathasala (Thai: ฉลามดำ นายกเอท่าศาลา) is a Thai Muay Thai fighter. He is a former Rajadamnern Stadium Bantamweight Champion and Channel 7 Stadium Bantamweight Champion.

== Career ==
Chalamdam started his fighting career under the name Kasikorn. On September 27, 2020, he challenged for the Channel 7 Stadium 105 lbs title against Yodbuangam Diamond98. He lost the fight by unanimous decision which led his camp owner to publicly criticize the judging.

In 2021 Chalamdam took part in the 21st annual Tiger Cement Tournament. Chalamdam reached the final of the tournament on June 5, 2022, where he defeated Wutikorn Suanathankhiri by unanimous decision to take home the 600,000 baht cash prize.

On September 18, 2022, Chalamdam faced Patakphet VK.KhaoYai for the vacant Channel 7 118 lbs title. Chalamdam won the fight by unanimous decision. The judges decision was met with a backlash from various observers including Chalamdam's opponent gym headman who took the decision to not send his fighters to compete on the Channel 7 Stadium promotion anymore.

Chalamdam faced Phetsommai Sor.Sommai on February 14, 2023, in the Uthai Thani province. He won the fight by decision, taking his winning streak to twelve in a row. Following this success Chalamdam became the #1 ranked 118 lbs Muay Thai fighter in the world according to both the WBC Muay Thai and the WMO. On March 30 it was revealed that Chalamdam was among the three fighters shortlisted for the 2022 Sports Writers Association of Thailand Fighter of the Year award.

Chalamdam faced Singdam Kafefocus on May 28, 2023, for the vacant Rajadamnern Stadium 122 lbs title. He won the fight by technical knockout in the fourth round. Following this success he was ranked as a top ten pound-for-pound fighter by the WMO.

== Titles and accomplishments ==
- Rajadamnern Stadium
  - 2023 Rajadamnern Stadium Super Bantamweight (122 lbs) Champion
- Channel 7 Boxing Stadium
  - 2021 Channel 7 Stadium Fighter of the Year
  - 2022 Tiger Cement Tournament Winner
  - 2022 Channel 7 Stadium Bantamweight (118 lbs) Champion
  - 2025 Channel 7 Stadium Bantamweight (118 lbs) Champion

Awards

- 2022 Sports Writers Association of Thailand Fighter of the Year

== Fight record ==
Muay Thai Record
Date	Result	Opponent	Event	Location	Method	Round	Time
2026-11-22		(Thailand) Kongtoranee Por.Kraipetch	TorNamThai Kiatpetch TKO + Deer Kiatpetch Birthday, Rajadamnern Stadium	Bangkok, Thailand			
2025-10-30	Loss	(Japan) Ryujin Nasukawa	Kickboxing Fes. GOAT	Tokyo, Japan	KO (Spinning back kick to the body)	1	1:38
2025-08-30	Loss	(Thailand) Jaroensuk BoonlannaMuaythai	Rajadamnern World Series, Rajadamnern Stadium	Bangkok, Thailand	KO (Left cross)	1	1:04
For the vacant Rajadamnern Stadium Bantamweight (118 lbs) title.
2025-05-24	Win	(Denmark) Jaspar Landal	Rajadamnern World Series, Rajadamnern Stadium	Bangkok, Thailand	Decision (Unanimous)	3	3:00
2025-04-13	Win	(Thailand) Wanchainoi Sitsarawatseur	Muay Thai 7see, Channel 7 Stadium	Bangkok, Thailand	Decision	5	3:00
Wins the Channel 7 Stadium Bantamweight (118 lbs) title.
2024-12-29	Win	(Thailand) Yokkiri TN.MuayThaiGym	MuayThai 7 Si, Channel 7 Muay Thai	Bangkok, Thailand	Decision	5	3:00
2024-10-27	Win	(Thailand) Petchsaensuk ChotBangSaen	MuayThai 7 Si, Channel 7 Muay Thai	Bangkok, Thailand	Decision	5	3:00
2024-09-22	Loss	(Thailand) Kohtao Petchsomnuk	MuayThai 7 Si, Channel 7 Stadium	Bangkok, Thailand	Decision	5	3:00
2024-03-31	Loss	(Thailand) Petchsiam Jor.Pattreya	MuayThai 7 Si, Channel 7 Stadium	Bangkok, Thailand	Decision	5	3:00
2024-02-25	Win	(Thailand) Petchsangwan Sor.SamarnGarment	MuayThai 7 Si, Channel 7 Muay Thai	Bangkok, Thailand	Decision	5	3:00
2023-12-08	Loss	(Thailand) Maisangkam Sor.Yingcharoenkanchang	ONE Friday Fights 44, Lumpinee Stadium	Bangkok, Thailand	KO (Left hook to the body)	1	2:54
2023-10-28	Loss	(Thailand) Petchsiam Jor.Pattreya	Muay Thai Vithee TinThai + Kiatpetch	Buriram Province, Thailand	Decision	5	3:00
2023-08-06	Lost	(Thailand) Han Petchkiatpetch	MuayThai 7 Si, Channel 7 Stadium	Bangkok, Thailand	Decision (unanimous)	5	3:00
Loses the Channel 7 Stadium Bantamweight (118 lbs) title.
2023-05-28	Win	(Thailand) Singdam Kafaefocus	TorNamThai Kiatpetch TKO, Rajadamnern Stadium	Bangkok, Thailand	TKO (Body kick)	4	1:48
Wins the vacant Rajadamnern Stadium Super Bantamweight (122 lbs) title.
2023-02-14	Win	(Thailand) Phetsommai Sor.Sommai	Muaymansananmuang Uthai	Uthai Thani province, Thailand	Decision	5	3:00
2022-12-10	Win	(Thailand) Wanwin LukjaoPorRongtom	SAT Samui Super Fight, Phetchbuncha Stadium	Ko Samui, Thailand	KO (High kick)	2	
2022-10-22	Win	(Thailand) Petchnamchok SorJor.Tongprachin	SAT + Kiatpetch Samui Super Fight, Phetchbuncha Stadium	Ko Samui, Thailand	KO (Middle kick)	3	1:53
2022-09-18	Win	(Thailand) Patakphet VK.Khaoyai	MuayThai 7 Si, Channel 7 Stadium	Bangkok, Thailand	Decision (Unanimous)	5	3:00
Wins the vacant Channel 7 Stadium Bantamweight (118 lbs) title.
2022-06-05	Win	(Thailand) Wuttikorn Suanathankhiri	MuayThai 7 Si, Channel 7 Stadium - Tiger Cement Tournament Final	Bangkok, Thailand	Decision (Unanimous)	5	3:00
Wins the 21st Tiger Cement Tournament title.
2022-05-01	Win	(Thailand) Pumjaithai Pakornponsurin	MuayThai 7 Si, Channel 7 Stadium - Tiger Cement Tournament Semi Final	Bangkok, Thailand	Decision	5	3:00
2022-02-20	Win	(Thailand) Petchsangwan Sor.Samarngarment	MuayThai 7 Si, Channel 7 Stadium - Tiger Cement Tournament	Bangkok, Thailand	Decision	5	3:00
2022-01-16	Win	(Thailand) Petchnamchai Sor.Jor.Tongprachin	MuayThai 7 Si, Channel 7 Stadium - Tiger Cement Tournament	Bangkok, Thailand	Decision	5	3:00
2021-11-21	Win	(Thailand) Petchsangwan Sor.Samarngarment	MuayThai 7 Si, Channel 7 Stadium - Tiger Cement Tournament	Bangkok, Thailand	Decision	5	3:00
2021-10-24	Win	(Thailand) Suakim Kor.Rungthanakiat	MuayThai 7 Si, Channel 7 Stadium - Tiger Cement Tournament	Bangkok, Thailand	Decision	5	3:00
2021-04-25	Win	(Thailand) Arnmuaydej Sitnayokmot	MuayThai 7 Si, Channel 7 Stadium	Bangkok, Thailand	TKO (Elbows)	4	
2021-03-20	Win	(Thailand) Petchnamchai Sor.Jor.Tongprachin	Muay Thai Lumpinee SuperFight, Lumpinee Stadium	Bangkok, Thailand	Decision	5	3:00
2020-12-13	Loss	(Thailand) Sudlor OdTukdaeng	MuayThai 7 Si, Channel 7 Stadium	Bangkok, Thailand	Decision	5	3:00
2020-09-27	Loss	(Thailand) Yodbuangam Diamond98	MuayThai 7 Si, Channel 7 Stadium	Bangkok, Thailand	Decision	5	3:00
For the Channel 7 Stadium Mini Flyweight (105 lbs) title.
2020-02-04	Loss	(Thailand) Pumjaithai Pakornphonsurin	Kiatpetch, Lumpinee Stadium	Bangkok, Thailand	Decision	5	3:00
2019-12-14	Win	(Thailand) Sudlor Od Tukdaeng	Muay Thai Lumpinee SuperFight, Lumpinee Stadium	Bangkok, Thailand	Decision	5	3:00
2019-10-25	Win	(Thailand) Khomphet Phiboonlai	P.K.Saenchai, Lumpinee Stadium	Bangkok, Thailand	Decision	5	3:00
2019-09-20	Win	(Thailand) Phetnamchok Phetchengchai	P.K.Saenchai, Lumpinee Stadium	Bangkok, Thailand	KO	3	
2019-07-30	Win	(Thailand) Phetsangsaeng Phetcharoenwit	P.K.Saenchai, Lumpinee Stadium	Bangkok, Thailand	Decision	5	3:00
2019-05-19	Win	(Thailand) Phetsangsaeng Phetcharoenwit	OrTorGor.3 Stadium	Nonthaburi province, Thailand	Decision	5	3:00
Wins 100,000 baht side-bet.
Legend: Win Loss Draw/No contest Notes
