= Parnthep V.K.Khaoyai =

Thai professional Muay Thai fighter

- Born: Panthep Yomkaewkerd; October 5, 2001 (age 25); Krabi, Thailand
- Other names: Samuenthep Por.Petchsiri (เสมือนเทพ ป.เพชรศิริ); Panthep Sitnumnoi; Panthep Ekmuangnon
- Height: 175 cm (5 ft 9 in)
- Division: Mini Flyweight; Flyweight; Super Bantamweight
- Style: Muay Thai (Muay Femur)
- Stance: Orthodox
- Fighting out of: Phuket, Thailand
- Team: Sitnumnoi (Singpatong)

Panthep Yomkaewkerd (born October 5, 2001), known professionally as Parnthep V.K.Khaoyai (Thai: ปานเทพ วีเคเขาใหญ่), is a Thai professional Muay Thai fighter. He is a former three-division Lumpinee Stadium champion and a Channel 7 Stadium champion.

== Titles and accomplishments ==
- Lumpinee Stadium
  - 2018 Lumpinee Stadium Mini Flyweight (105 lbs) Champion
  - 2019 Lumpinee Stadium Flyweight (112 lbs) Champion
  - 2019 Lumpinee Stadium Rising Star Award
  - 2023 Lumpinee Stadium Super Bantamweight (122 lbs) Champion
- Channel 7 Stadium
  - 2022 Channel 7 Stadium Super Bantamweight (122 lbs) Champion

== Fight record ==
Muay Thai Record
Date	Result	Opponent	Event	Location	Method	Round	Time
2025-09-21	Win	(Thailand) Mahasamut RongpaesamnakbokChonburi	TorNamThai Kiatpetch TKO, Rajadamnern Stadium	Bangkok, Thailand	KO	3	
2025-05-17	Loss	(Thailand) Petchsiam Jor.Pattreya	Matuphum: Mother Land of Muay Thai	Chum Phuang district, Thailand	Decision	5	3:00
2025-04-06	Win	(Thailand) Petchsansaeb Sor.Jaruwan	Channel 7 Stadium	Bangkok, Thailand	Decision	5	3:00
2025-01-19	Win	(Thailand) Chatploy Por.Homklin	Channel 7 Stadium	Bangkok, Thailand	DQ (kick to a downed opponent)	2	
2024-10-06	Draw	(Thailand) Ratchadet TN.MuayThaiGym	Channel 7 Stadium	Bangkok, Thailand	Decision	5	3:00
2024-08-12	Win	(Thailand) Plaipayak Sor.Sommai	Muaydee VitheeThai, Thupatemi Stadium	Pathum Thani, Thailand	KO	3	
2024-05-18	Loss	(Thailand) Petchsamarn Sor.Samarngarment	Rajadamnern World Series	Bangkok, Thailand	Decision (Unanimous)	5	3:00
For the vacant Rajadamnern Stadium Super Bantamweight (122 lbs) title.
2024-03-15	Loss	(Thailand) Phumjaithai Mor.Tor.1	ONE Friday Fights 55	Bangkok, Thailand	TKO (Body punches)	3	0:16
2024-02-11	Win	(Thailand) Attachai KelaSport	Channel 7 Muay Thai, Channel 7 Stadium	Bangkok, Thailand	Decision	5	3:00
2023-12-24	Draw	(Thailand) Lukkwan Sujibamigiew	Muaydee VitheeThai + Jitmuangnon, OrTorGor.3 Stadium	Nonthaburi province, Thailand	Decision	5	3:00
2023-11-05	Win	(Thailand) Chatploy Sor.Poonsawat	Muaydee VitheeThai + Jitmuangnon, OrTorGor.3 Stadium	Nonthaburi province, Thailand	Decision	5	3:00
2023-09-15	Win	(Thailand) Chalamkhao PK Saenchai	ONE Friday Fights 33, Lumpinee Stadium	Bangkok, Thailand	Decision (Unanimous)	3	3:00
2023-08-04	Loss	(Scotland) Stephen Irvine	ONE Friday Fights 27, Lumpinee Stadium	Bangkok, Thailand	TKO (3 knockdowns/Punches)	2	1:27
2023-06-16	Win	(Thailand) Yodkumarn Maxjandee	ONE Friday Fights 21, Lumpinee Stadium	Bangkok, Thailand	Decision (Unanimous)	3	3:00
2023-05-20	Win	(Thailand) Petchnangam Kiatphanthamit	LWC Super Champ, Lumpinee Stadium	Bangkok, Thailand	Decision	5	3:00
Wins the vacant Lumpinee Stadium Super Bantamweight (122 lbs) title.
2023-04-08	Win	(Thailand) Lukkwan Sujibamigiew	LWC Super Champ, Lumpinee Stadium	Bangkok, Thailand	Decision	3	3:00
2023-01-28	Win	(Cambodia) Long Unchoeut	LWC Super Champ, Lumpinee Stadium	Bangkok, Thailand	KO	4	
2023-01-07	Loss	(Thailand) Petchsamarn Sor.Samarngarment	Chang MuayThai Kiatpetch Amarin Super Fight, World Siam Stadium	Bangkok, Thailand	Decision	5	3:00
2022-11-26	Win	(Thailand) Panpetch Liemthanawat	TorNamThai Kiatpetch TKO, World Siam Stadium	Bangkok, Thailand	KO (Elbow)	4	
2022-08-27	Win	(Thailand) Comeback TK.Yuttana	Kiatpetch TKO, World Siam Stadium	Bangkok, Thailand	TKO	4	
2022-07-11	Loss	(Thailand) Surachai Sor.Sommai	New Power Muaythai, Dhupatemiya Stadium	Songkhla province, Thailand	Decision	5	3:00
2022-05-08	Win	(Thailand) Petchsamarn Sor.Samarngarment	Channel 7 Stadium	Bangkok, Thailand	Decision	5	3:00
Wins the Channel 7 Stadium Super Bantamweight (122 lbs) title.
2022-04-03	Win	(Thailand) Petchsaensaeb SorJor.TongPrachin	Chang Muaythai Kiatpetch Amarin, Rajadamnern Stadium	Bangkok, Thailand	Decision	5	3:00
2022-02-20	Win	(Thailand) Petchmaeprik Fordpayakdannuea	Chang Muaythai Kiatpetch Amarin, Rajadamnern Stadium	Bangkok, Thailand	KO	4	
2021-11-20	Loss	(Thailand) Superlek Jitmuangnon	Omnoi Stadium	Samut Sakhon, Thailand	Decision	5	3:00
For the Omnoi Stadium and Thailand Super Bantamweight (122 lbs) titles.
2021-03-26	Win	(Thailand) Parnpetch Sor.Jor.Lekmuangnon	Suk Kiatpetch Super Fight, Lumpinee Stadium	Bangkok, Thailand	Decision	5	3:00
2020-12-18	Draw	(Thailand) Kiew Parunchai	Suk Singmawin	Songkhla, Thailand	Decision	5	3:00
2020-10-21	Win	(Thailand) Mohawk Tded99	Petchwittaya, Rajadamnern Stadium	Bangkok, Thailand	KO	2	
2020-08-14	Loss	(Thailand) Phetanuwat Nor.Anuwatgym	Muaymanwansuk, Rangsit Stadium	Rangsit, Thailand	Decision	5	3:00
2020-01-14	Win	(Thailand) Yod Parunchai	Petchkiatpetch, Lumpinee Stadium	Bangkok, Thailand	Decision	5	3:00
Defends the Lumpinee Stadium Flyweight (112 lbs) title.
2019-12-18	Win	(Thailand) Petchzeeta GobWasaduPanPhuketMuayThai	Singmawin, Rajadamnern Stadium	Bangkok, Thailand	Decision	5	3:00
2019-11-05	Loss	(Thailand) Wanchainoi Sitsarawatseur	Kiatpetch, Lumpinee Stadium	Bangkok, Thailand	KO	3	
2019-09-24	Win	(Thailand) Nuapetch KelaSport	Petchnumnoi + Prestige Fight, Lumpinee Stadium	Bangkok, Thailand	KO (Knee to the Body)	4	
Wins the Lumpinee Stadium Flyweight (112 lbs) title.
2019-07-23	Draw	(Thailand) Petchrungruang Odtuekdaeng	Muay Thai 1T, Lumpinee Stadium	Bangkok, Thailand	Decision	5	3:00
2019-06-11	Win	(Thailand) Petchmuangpan Bamrungsit	Sangmorakot, Lumpinee Stadium	Bangkok, Thailand	KO	3	
2019-04-30	Loss	(Thailand) Petchrungruang Odtuekdaeng	Petchnumnoi + Prestige Fight, Lumpinee Stadium	Bangkok, Thailand	Decision	5	3:00
2019-03-22	Loss	(Thailand) Petchanuwat Nor.AnuwatGym	Muaymanwansuk + Petchnumnoi, Lumpinee Stadium	Bangkok, Thailand	KO	3	
2019-01-22	Win	(Thailand) Petchrungruang Odtuekdaeng	PK.Saenchai, Lumpinee Stadium	Bangkok, Thailand	Decision	5	3:00
2018-12-25	Win	(Thailand) Petchrungruang Odtuekdaeng	Petchnumnoi, Lumpinee Stadium	Bangkok, Thailand	Decision	5	3:00
2018-11-30	Win	(Thailand) Ittipon Singmawin	Petchnumnoi, Lumpinee Stadium	Bangkok, Thailand	Decision	5	3:00
Wins the vacant Lumpinee Stadium Mini Flyweight (105 lbs) title.
2018-10-25	Loss	(Thailand) Petchanuwat Nor.AnuwatGym	Petchyindee, Rajadamnern Stadium	Bangkok, Thailand	Decision	5	3:00
2018-09-25	Win	(Thailand) Chaiyo Petchyindee	Petchnumnoi, Lumpinee Stadium	Bangkok, Thailand	Decision	5	3:00
2018-08-28	Win	(Thailand) Malaithong Chor.Ruangam	Petchnumnoi + Street Fight, Lumpinee Stadium	Bangkok, Thailand	Decision	5	3:00
2018-06-05	Loss	(Thailand) Hercules Phetsimean	Lumpinee champion Kruekrai, Lumpinee Stadium	Bangkok, Thailand	Decision	5	3:00
For the vacant Lumpinee Stadium Mini Flyweight (105 lbs) title.
2018-05-02	Loss	(Thailand) Hercules Phetsimean	Petchwittaya, Rajadamnern Stadium	Bangkok, Thailand	Decision	5	3:00
2018-03-27	Win	(Thailand) Chalaamkow Tor.Morsi	Kiatpetch, Lumpinee Stadium	Bangkok, Thailand	Decision	5	3:00
2017-12-26	Win	(Thailand) Kompayak Sor.Jor.Vichitpaedriw	Petchnumnoi, Lumpinee Stadium	Bangkok, Thailand	KO	3	
2017-11-10	Win	(Thailand) Tabtimthong SorJor.Lekmuangnon	Petchnumnoi, Lumpinee Stadium	Bangkok, Thailand	Decision	5	3:00
2017-09-08	Win	(Thailand) Petchbanrai Singmawin	Kiatpetch + OneParunchai, Lumpinee Stadium	Bangkok, Thailand	Decision	5	3:00
2017-07-20	Win	(Thailand) Petchbanrai Singmawin	Lumpinee Stadium	Bangkok, Thailand	Decision	5	3:00
2017-05-16	Win	(Thailand) PhetAek FighterMuayThai	Lumpinee Stadium	Bangkok, Thailand	Decision	5	3:00
2017-03-31	Draw	(Thailand) Petchbanrai Singmawin	Lumpinee Stadium	Bangkok, Thailand	Decision	5	3:00
2017-03-07	Win	(Thailand) Yodsing Singmawin	Lumpinee Stadium	Bangkok, Thailand	Decision	5	3:00
2017-02-12	Win	(Thailand) Phetrung Sor.Jor.Lekmuangnon	Jitmuangnon Stadium	Bangkok, Thailand	Decision	5	3:00
Legend: Win Loss Draw/No contest Notes
