= Petchsiam Jor.Pattreya =

Thai Muay Thai fighter

Petchsiam
- Born: Sitthichai Somphoom; August 25, 2004 (age 22); Kap Choeng, Surin, Thailand
- Other names: Petchsiam Jor.PatreeyaKilaSiamSurin (เพชรสยาม จ.ภัทจรียากีฬาสยามสุรินทร์); PetchSiam NamduemT2A.WaterUbon
- Height: 170 cm (5 ft 7 in)
- Division: Light Flyweight; Bantamweight; Super Bantamweight
- Stance: Southpaw
- Fighting out of: Surin, Thailand
- Team: Chor.Patthriya

Kickboxing record
- Total: 98
- Wins: 78
- Losses: 19
- Draws: 1

Sitthichai Somphoom (born August 25, 2004), known professionally as Petchsiam Jor.Pattreya (Thai: เพชรสยาม จ.ภัทรีย, is a Thai Muay Thai fighter. He is a former Rajadamnern Stadium Light Flyweight Champion and Rajadamnern Stadium Super Bantamweight Champion.

As of October 2024, he is ranked #5 in the WMO's Super Bantamweight rankings.

== Career ==
Petchsiam won his first major title on February 7, 2022, when he defeated Petchmawin Singmawynn by decision to capture the Rajadamnern Stadium light flyweight title. He later vacated the title in order to move up in weight.

On September 24, 2023, Petchsiam defeated Detchpet Muayded789 by decision at the Channel 7 Stadium.

In December 2023 Petchsiam was announced as part of a shortlist of 3 fighters nominated for the 2023 Sports Authority of Thailand Fighter of the Year award.

As of March 2024 he was ranked as one of the 10 best pound-for-pound muay thai fighters in the world by the WMO.

Following his knockout loss against Khunsueklek Boomdeksian in May 2024, Petchsiam's Rajadamnern Stadium Super Bantamweight title was stripped from him. Petchsamarn Sor.Samarngarment and Parnthep V.K.Khaoyai's interim title fight planned for the month after was promoted to a fight for the regular Rajadamnern Stadium Super Bantamweight title.

== Titles and accomplishments ==
- Rajadamnern Stadium
  - 2022 Rajadamnern Stadium Light Flyweight (108 lbs) Champion
  - 2024 Rajadamnern Stadium Super Bantamweight (122 lbs) Champion
- Channel 7 Stadium
  - 2026 Channel 7 Stadium Super Bantamweight (122 lbs) Champion
    - One successful title defense

== Fight record ==
Muay Thai Record
78 Wins, 19 Losses, 1 Draw
Date	Result	Opponent	Event	Location	Method	Round	Time
2026-09-11	Win	(China) Wang Zhongxian	ONE The Inner Circle 31, Lumpinee Stadium	Bangkok, Thailand	Decision (unanimous)	3	3:00
2026-07-10	Win	(Azerbaijan) Nihad Taghizade	ONE Friday Fights 161, Lumpinee Stadium	Bangkok, Thailand	TKO (middle kicks)	1	1:53
2026-04-26	Win	(Thailand) Poye Wor.Santai	Channel 7 Stadium	Bangkok, Thailand	Decision	5	3:00
Defends the Channel 7 Stadium Super Bantamweight (122 lbs) title.
2026-02-28	Win	(Thailand) Kompetch Sitsarawatsuer	Muay Thai Witee Tin Thai	Buriram province, Thailand	Decision	5	3:00
2026-01-11	Win	(Thailand) Rittidet Lukjaoporongtom	Channel 7 Stadium	Bangkok, Thailand	Decision	5	3:00
Wins the vacant Channel 7 Stadium Super Bantamweight (122 lbs) title.
2025-10-24	Win	(Japan) Ryuki Matsuda	ONE Friday Fights 130, Lumpinee Stadium	Bangkok, Thailand	Decision (unanimous)	3	3:00
2025-09-26	Win	(Thailand) Peemai Erawan	Top Fairy Gym, Thupatemi Stadium	Pathum Thani, Thailand	Decision	5	3:00
2025-08-31	Draw	(Thailand) Poye Wor.Santai	Channel 7 Stadium	Bangkok, Thailand	Decision	5	3:00
2025-07-13	Win	(Thailand) Wanchainoi SorTor.HiewBangSaen	Channel 7 Stadium	Bangkok, Thailand	Decision	5	3:00
2025-05-17	Win	(Thailand) Parnthep V.K.Khaoyai	Matuphum: Mother Land of Muay Thai	Chum Phuang district, Thailand	Decision	5	3:00
2025-04-20	Win	(Thailand) Songpayak Boomdeksian	Channel 7 Stadium	Bangkok, Thailand	Decision	5	3:00
2025-03-01	Win	(Thailand) Petchsangwan Sor.SamarnGarment	Muay Thai Withi Tin Thai	Buriram province, Thailand	Decision	5	3:00
2025-01-12	Loss	(Thailand) Singdam Kafaefocus	Channel 7 Stadium	Bangkok, Thailand	Decision	5	3:00
2024-12-08	Win	(Thailand) Teeded ChangNakhonsi	Channel 7 Stadium	Bangkok, Thailand	Decision	5	3:00
2024-10-26	Loss	(Thailand) Den SitNayaktaweebtapong	Muay Thai Vithee TinThai + Kiatpetch, Chang International Circuit	Buriram province, Thailand	Decision	5	3:00
2024-08-12	Loss	(Thailand) Petchsangwan Sor.SamarnGarment	Channel 7 Stadium	Bangkok, Thailand	KO (knees)	3	
2024-07-04	Loss	(Thailand) Petchsila Wor.Auracha	Petchyindee + Kiatpetch, Rajadamnern Stadium	Bangkok, Thailand	Decision	5	3:00
2024-05-11	Loss	(Thailand) Khunsueklek Boomdeksian	Rajadamnern World Series	Bangkok, Thailand	KO (left high kick)	3	0:32
For the Rajadamnern Stadium Bantamweight (118 lbs) title. Stripped of his 122 lbs title for losing by knockout.
2024-03-31	Win	(Thailand) Chalamdam Nayokathasala	Channel 7 Stadium	Bangkok, Thailand	Decision	5	3:00
2024-02-17	Win	(Thailand) Wuttikorn Suannamtankiri	Rajadamnern World Series, Rajadamnern Stadium	Bangkok, Thailand	TKO (referee stoppage)	4	
Wins the vacant Rajadamnern Stadium Super Bantamweight (122 lbs) title.
2023-12-13	Win	(Thailand) PetchNongNuey NokKhao-GorMor.11	Chang Muay Thai Kiatpetch Tesaban Muang Cha-am Sanjorn	Phetchaburi province, Thailand	Decision	5	3:00
2023-10-28	Win	(Thailand) Chalamdam Nayokathasala	Muay Thai Vithee TinThai + Kiatpetch	Buriram Province, Thailand	Decision	5	3:00
2023-09-24	Win	(Thailand) Detchpet Muayded789	Channel 7 Stadium	Bangkok, Thailand	Decision	5	3:00
2023-08-05	Win	(Thailand) Kongpop Wor.Suksan	Ruamponkon Samui, Phetchbuncha Stadium	Ko Samui, Thailand	Decision	5	3:00
2023-06-11	Win	(Thailand) Sudlor Aod Tuk Daeng	TorNamThai Kiatpetch TKO, Rajadamnern Stadium	Bangkok, Thailand	TKO	4	
2023-05-14	Win	(Thailand) Wanwiset Sor.Dechapan	TorNamThai Kiatpetch TKO, Rajadamnern Stadium	Bangkok, Thailand	TKO (elbows)	2	1:09
2023-04-16	Win	(Thailand) Maisangkham Sor.YingcharoenKarnchang	TorNamThai Kiatpetch TKO, Rajadamnern Stadium	Bangkok, Thailand	Decision	5	3:00
2023-02-26	Win	(Thailand) Wuttikorn Suannamtankiri	Kiatpetch, Channel 7 Stadium	Bangkok, Thailand	Decision	5	3:00
2023-02-11	Loss	(Brazil) Dionata Sor.Dechapan	Ruamponkon Samui, Phetchbuncha Stadium	Ko Samui, Thailand	Decision	5	3:00
2023-01-22	Win	(Thailand) Yokkiri Sor.Petchamrat	Kiatpetch, Channel 7 Stadium	Bangkok, Thailand	Decision	5	3:00
2023-01-01	Win	(Thailand) Tahaneak Nayokatasala	Kiatpetch, Channel 7 Stadium	Bangkok, Thailand	Decision	5	3:00
2022-11-19	Loss	(Thailand) Wuttikorn Suannamtankiri	Lumpini Muay Thai TKO, Lumpinee Stadium	Bangkok, Thailand	Decision	5	3:00
2022-10-16	Loss	(Thailand) Phayakjiew KeelaSport	Chang Muay Thai Kiatpetch, Rajadamnern Stadium	Bangkok, Thailand	KO (Knee to the body)	3	
2022-09-19	Win	(Thailand) Lomchoi Sor.Therapat	Palangmai, Thupatemi Stadium	Pathum Thani, Thailand	KO	4	
2022-08-21	Win	(Thailand) Samersing Lukchaoporluangwang	Chang Muay Thai Kiatpetch, Rajadamnern Stadium	Bangkok, Thailand	KO (Knee to the body)	4	
2022-07-17	Loss	(Thailand) Phetnamchai Sor.Jor.TongPrachin	Chang Muay Thai Kiatpetch, Rajadamnern Stadium	Bangkok, Thailand	KO (Kick to the groin)	2	
2022-06-19	Win	(Thailand) Domthong Lukjaoporongtom	Channel 7 Stadium	Bangkok, Thailand	Decision	5	3:00
2022-05-08	Win	(Thailand) Domthong Lukjaoporongtom	Kiatpetch, Rajadamnern Stadium	Bangkok, Thailand	Decision	5	3:00
2022-03-06	Loss	(Thailand) Phetmalai Petcharoenwit	Kiatpetch, Rajadamnern Stadium	Bangkok, Thailand	TKO (Referee stoppage)	4	
2022-02-07	Win	(Thailand) Petchmawin Singmawynn	Rajadamnern World Series, Rajadamnern Stadium	Bangkok, Thailand	Decision	5	3:00
Wins the Rajadamnern Stadium Light Flyweight (108 lbs) title.
2021-12-20	Loss	(Thailand) Sudlor Aod TukDaeng	Singmawynn, Rajadamnern Stadium	Bangkok, Thailand	KO (Knee to the head)	3	
2021-11-20	Loss	(Thailand) Phetsongsang Petchyindee Academy	Kiatpetch, Lumpinee Stadium	Bangkok, Thailand	Decision	5	3:00
2021-10-24	Win	(Thailand) Phetsongsang Petchyindee Academy	Phetkiatpetch, Phetchbuncha Samui Stadium	Ko Samui, Thailand	Decision	5	3:00
2021-10-09	Win	(Thailand) Nong-O Chor.Rueangram	Phetkiatpetch, Phetchbuncha Samui Stadium	Ko Samui, Thailand	Decision	5	3:00
2021-04-03	Win	(Thailand) Putti Nanumnee	Kiatpetch, Lumpinee Stadium	Bangkok, Thailand	Decision	5	3:00
2021-02-21	Win	(Thailand) Saiphet KongthaniMuayThai	Chang Muay Thai Kiatpetch, Or.Tor.Gor 3 Stadium	Nonthaburi, Thailand	Decision	5	3:00
2020-02-01	Loss	(Thailand) Khunsueklek Boomdeksian		Nakhon Ratchasima province, Thailand	Decision	5	3:00
2019-05-24	Loss	(Thailand) Khunsueklek Boomdeksian		Maha Sarakham province, Thailand	Decision	5	3:00
Legend: Win Loss Draw/No contest Notes

== See also ==
- Rajadamnern Stadium
