= Mathieu Ferland =

Canadian video game producer

- Born: January 26, 1974 (age 52); Montreal, Quebec, Canada
- Occupation: Video game producer
- Employer: Ubisoft Montreal

Mathieu Ferland (born January 26, 1974) is a Canadian video game producer best known for producing the Tom Clancy's Splinter Cell series for Ubisoft Montreal. IGN has named him the 75th greatest game creator of all time .

== Notable games ==
- Tom Clancy's Splinter Cell (2002)
- Tom Clancy's Splinter Cell: Pandora Tomorrow (2004)
- Tom Clancy's Splinter Cell: Chaos Theory (2005)
- Assassin's Creed (2007)
- Tom Clancy's Splinter Cell: Double Agent (2006)
- Tom Clancy's Splinter Cell: Conviction 2010
