= Tom Clancy's Splinter Cell: Double Agent =

2006 video game

- North American box art
- Developers: Ubisoft Milan (Xbox 360, PC and PlayStation 3); Ubisoft Shanghai (Xbox 360, PC and PlayStation 3); Ubisoft Montreal (Xbox, GameCube, PlayStation 2 and Wii) (Note: Gameloft developed a mobile version)
- Publisher: Ubisoft
- Designers: Chris Smith; David Laquerre; Thomas Simon
- Composers: Michael McCann; Cris Velasco; Sascha Dikiciyan
- Series: Tom Clancy's Splinter Cell
- Engine: Unreal Engine 2.5
- Platforms: Xbox 360; GameCube; PlayStation 2; Xbox; Windows; Wii; PlayStation 3; Mobile phone
- Release: October 19, 2006: Mobile September 2006 Xbox 360; NA: October 19, 2006; PAL: October 20, 2006 GameCube, PlayStation 2, Xbox; NA: October 24, 2006; AU: October 26, 2006; EU: October 27, 2006 Microsoft Windows; NA: November 7, 2006; PAL: November 10, 2006 Wii; NA: November 28, 2006; AU: December 7, 2006; EU: December 8, 2006 PlayStation 3; NA: March 27, 2007; PAL: March 30, 2007
- Genres: Action-adventure, stealth
- Modes: Single-player, multiplayer

Tom Clancy's Splinter Cell: Double Agent is a 2006 action-adventure stealth game co-developed by Ubisoft Milan and Ubisoft Shanghai, and published by Ubisoft. The Splinter Cell series, endorsed by American author Tom Clancy, follows Sam Fisher, an agent employed by a black-ops division of the National Security Agency (NSA), dubbed Third Echelon. The game was released for GameCube, PlayStation 2, Xbox and Xbox 360 in October 2006. The Wii and Windows versions were released in November 2006. A PlayStation 3 version was released in March 2007.

There are two separate versions of Double Agent. The first version was made by Ubisoft Montreal (Splinter Cell and Splinter Cell: Chaos Theory) and was released for GameCube, PlayStation 2, Wii, and Xbox. The second version was made by Ubisoft Milan and Ubisoft Shanghai, developers of Splinter Cell: Pandora Tomorrow, and was released for PlayStation 3, Windows and Xbox 360. The Ubisoft Milan & Shanghai version features a completely custom engine while the Ubisoft Montreal version is built on the technology of earlier Splinter Cell games. The games share the same general plot but feature different storylines, plot twists and levels. They do however, share the same background music, a few cutscenes and all voice actors. Another separate version for mobile phones was developed by Gameloft.

Splinter Cell: Double Agent received positive reviews from critics for most platforms. A sequel, titled Conviction, released in 2010.

== Plot ==
The two main versions of the game feature different plot lines. They share many of the same locations, but with completely different level designs and in a different order.

Before the events of Splinter Cell: Essentials, Sam Fisher must deal with the recent loss of his daughter to a drunk driving crash. But he has little time to mourn, as he soon has to go on an undercover assignment which requires him to pose as a criminal in order to infiltrate a terrorist group based in the United States. This new mission forces Fisher into a new and very dangerous gray area, where the line between right and wrong is blurred even beyond what Fisher is used to, and thousands of innocent lives are in the balance.

=== Microsoft Windows, PlayStation 3, and Xbox 360 version ===
In September 2007, Sam Fisher and rookie field agent John Hodge are being flown to Iceland to investigate suspicious activities at a geothermal plant, which is also Hodges' training mission. After he averts a missile strike by terrorists during which Hodge is killed, he is met by Colonel Irving Lambert aboard the V-22 Osprey, who bears bad news: Sarah Fisher, Fisher's only child, has died after being hit by a drunk driver. Overcome with grief, he is pulled out of active service.

Lambert offers him a job as a nonofficial cover operative, hoping that it will help him refocus. The NSA stages multiple bank robberies and killings to set up Fisher to infiltrate a domestic terror organization known as John Brown's Army (JBA). He is planned by the CIA to be sent to Ellsworth Prison in Kansas where he is placed in the same cell block as Jamie Washington, a JBA member, and begins digging a tunnel for escape. By February 2008, Fisher helps Washington escape, and is welcomed into the JBA.

At their compound, Emile Dufraisne, the leader of the JBA, gives Fisher the order to shoot Cole Yeager, the pilot of the helicopter used to escape the prison, affecting Fisher's standing between the JBA and NSA. He is then sent on a mission to take over a Russian oil tanker in the Sea of Okhotsk, while receiving radio contact from Enrica Villablanca, the JBA's weapons expert. Fisher needs to take over the tanker so that JBA ally Massoud Ibn-Yussif can use it to deliver one of Emile's bombs.

As soon as Fisher is finished, he is quickly flown to the Jin Mao Hotel in Shanghai. CIA operative Hisham Hamza, who has infiltrated Yussif's organization, orders him to record a meeting between Emile and a Pakistani nuclear scientist, Dr. Aswat. During the meeting, Aswat sells Emile several kilograms of red mercury, an explosive material that can detonate with the force of a thermonuclear bomb. With Third Echelon on high alert, Fisher is told to collect a sample from the safe in the meeting room. While he does this, Carson Moss, the JBA's head of security, radios in and orders him to steal notes from Aswat's hotel room. The NSA then orders Aswat's assassination.

With both the red mercury and Dr. Aswat's notes, the JBA constructs a bomb which they wish to test. Emile sends Fisher to Cozumel to blow up a cruise ship. The success of the bomb is determined by the player and is therefore the first of the three major events. Fisher can choose to either let the bomb detonate, maintaining his cover with the JBA, prevent the explosion by jamming the signal, or framing Enrica by using her disarm code, if the player acquires it from her office during the third JBA HQ mission. Jamming the signal makes player lose JBA trust, while framing Enrica maintains both NSA and JBA trust. In both of these cases, non-detonation causes Dufraisne to kill Enrica in a fit of anger.

Emile then goes to a meeting in Kinshasa with Yussif and Alejandro Takfir, another ally of the JBA. Fisher bugs the meeting and finds out that the three terrorist leaders each have Red Mercury bombs. They plan to destroy Mexico City, Los Angeles and New York City. During the meeting, Hisham's cover is blown.

Emile orders Fisher to kill Hisham, who has fled to the Congolese presidential palace in a war-torn Kinshasa. Fisher takes up a position from the top of a radio tower with a sniper rifle. Fisher may shoot Hisham, or spare and extract him.

When Fisher returns to the headquarters, he is ordered to shoot Lambert, who was captured sneaking around the complex. The player can decide to either shoot Lambert or Washington. Shooting Lambert will maintain the JBA's trust, while shooting Washington will send the JBA into high alert and reveal Fisher as a traitor. Enrica, if she is still alive, discovers Fisher's NOC status, but allows him to pass into the labs underneath the HQ, even giving him his equipment if he does not have it already. When Fisher arrives at the labs, he manages to kill Emile (and Washington if he did not kill him earlier) and disarms the bomb. A SWAT team then storms the compound, crashing in through the ceiling. This version of Double Agent is canon to the series' storyline.

==== Multiple endings ====
The ending depends upon completion of the following objectives: saving the cruise ship, Hisham and Lambert.

- If Fisher fails all three, or fails two with the NSA standing below 33%, he initially surrenders to the SWAT team, but immediately escapes using a smoke grenade.
- If Fisher fails two with the NSA standing above 33%, or completes two or three with the NSA standing below 33%, he is captured, charged with murder and conspiracy to commit terrorism, and pleads "not guilty". After the trial, however, Fisher breaks out of prison and is on the run.
- If Fisher completes two or three objectives with the NSA standing above 33%, he evades capture and escapes the compound by incapacitating a SWAT officer and donning his stolen uniform. In the unlocked bonus level, he boards a stolen Coast Guard vessel that Carson Moss is using to deliver the last bomb. Fisher kills Moss, disarms the bomb and escapes seconds before Third Echelon destroys the vessel. This ending is the only one that finishes with "To be continued..."

Canonically, Fisher saves the cruise ship, saves Hisham and shoots Lambert to maintain his cover.

=== Xbox, PlayStation 2, GameCube and Wii version ===
In January 2008, Sam and CIA agent Hisham Hamza are being flown to Iceland to investigate suspicious activities at a geothermal plant. However, the mission is aborted, with Irving Lambert activating a two-man Splinter Cell team to destroy the plant. Sam is met by Lambert aboard the Osprey to deliver bad news. Sarah Fisher, Sam's only child, has died after being hit by a drunk driver. Overcome with grief, he is unable to concentrate on his work and is pulled out of active service.

Lambert offers Sam a job as a non-official cover operative, hoping that infiltrating John Brown's Army (JBA) will help Sam refocus. Acting in multiple staged bank robberies and killings, Fisher becomes an infamous criminal and is incarcerated in Ellsworth Prison, Kansas, where he befriends cellmate Jamie Washington, a JBA member. With indirect assistance from a Splinter Cell team, Fisher helps Washington escape, and is welcomed into the JBA.

At their compound in New Orleans, Sam finds an e-mail written by JBA member Cole Yeager describing his intentions to take over JBA. If he chooses to send this information to the NSA, they briefly extract Yeager for interrogation; the information can also be sent to JBA, in which case Yeager is killed by the terrorists. Sam is then sent to hijack a train in Grand Central Station, carrying a large sum of money, gold and jewelry. Because Lambert pretends to be an arms dealer for the JBA, Sam has access to his NSA equipment and is easily briefed.

After the JBA constructs a bomb using red mercury, Emile sends Fisher to Cozumel, Mexico to test it by blowing up a cruise ship. If the player chooses to sabotage the bomb detonation, Sam and Enrica are severely beaten. If the detonator is left operative, the bomb will go off with many victims. Unlike the other version, this decision does not affect the ending of the game.

Sam is then sent on a mission to take over a Russian oil tanker in the Sea of Okhotsk. Two computers on the tanker have an e-mail to Emile from an anonymous sender who intends to blow Lambert's cover as an arms dealer. Emile then goes to a meeting in Kinshasa with Alejandro Takfir and Massoud Ibn-Yussif, allies of the JBA, to buy more red mercury. He orders Fisher to kill Hisham and, depending on the player's actions, Sam will be reprimanded by Emile or Lambert. Fisher uncovers information that sets up a mission for a Splinter Cell team to sabotage a chemical bunker owned by Takfir. An e-mail on Massoud's computer reveals that there is a mole inside the NSA.

When Fisher returns to the headquarters, he discovers that Lambert has been taken hostage, and the terrorists are about to send off the Red Mercury. Sam must alter server information to confirm or deny Lambert's NSA ties; the choice either causes Lambert's death, or costs Sam significant JBA trust (respectively). Additionally, players can choose to disarm two of the red mercury bombs prior to their transportation, allowing Sam to prevent their detonation, or send signals to Emile's men to use an alternate route in order to prevent the bombs from being defused.

Regardless of player choices, the JBA discovers Sam is a spy during their final operation in New York. Assistant Director Williams authorizes the Fifth Freedom and orders Sam to kill all the top-ranking members of the JBA, while another Splinter Cell team disarms various Red Mercury bombs headed for Los Angeles by tanker. Enrica, unable to kill Fisher, assists Sam. Sam kills Emile and disables the last bomb on the rooftop. Enrica comes looking for Sam, but is shot and killed by a Splinter Cell agent. Enraged, Sam ambushes and kills the agent, leaving as he removes his cochlear implant using his knife. He accuses Williams of murdering Enrica and vows revenge; Williams says that they will find him first.

During the credits, a breaking news report is shown: any bombs Sam did not sabotage are detonated, killing thousands; however, any deactivated bombs are reported as being discovered. Additionally, if the Nashville bomb explodes, it is noted that the President has been killed during a visit, and he is succeeded by his vice president.

== Multiplayer ==
=== Microsoft Windows, PlayStation 3 and Xbox 360 version ===
Upon joining the game, the player selects one of two sides: the Spies of Third Echelon or the Mercenaries of Upsilon Force. The choice of side affects the player's mission objectives, equipment, and overall play style.

- Third Echelon Spies. The Echelon Spies are extremely fast and agile, much more so than the Mercenaries. The Spies have a variety of almost superhuman acrobatic maneuvers that allow them to navigate the map and infiltrate areas that their opponents cannot reach on foot. The mission objective of the spies is to retrieve two encrypted files from four terminals scattered around the map. The spies use their wrist computer to hack the terminal. The closer the spy is to the terminal, the faster it can be hacked. All progress made whilst hacking any terminal is cumulative for that particular spy until he is killed, when the information will be lost. To win the game, the spy team must retrieve 2 files and return them to their starting point. The spy team can also win by killing all of the Upsilon Force members, but this method is risky and not advised, unless highly skilled in doing so. The whole mission takes place in less than 20 minutes, otherwise Upsilon wins the match.
- Mercenaries of Upsilon Force. The Mercenaries of Upsilon Force are heavily armed with a variety of ways to neutralize intruders. They have a melee attack that knocks their opponents to the ground and temporarily stuns them. They have the ability to sprint for a limited period of time, reducing their turning and aiming accuracy. Mercenaries can also sprint into a spy, knocking them down and stunning them temporarily. They can rappel down certain surfaces, allowing them to move to lower floors quickly. The mission objective of the Mercenaries is to defend the four terminals from attack by the Spies. The Mercenaries win when they kill all of the Spies or when the timer runs out before the Spies can successfully return two files. Mercenaries receive an audio and visual alert whenever a terminal is being hacked and also can see which Spy is currently hacking and how much of the file has been retrieved.

=== PlayStation 2 and Xbox version ===
The Xbox and PlayStation 2 versions have a Spy vs. Upsilon mode, with players able to play as Echelon Spies or the Upsilon agents, and also has a co-op mode intertwined with the single player portion of the game.

In line with other original Xbox games, online multiplayer support for Double Agent was terminated on April 15, 2010. Despite this, there are revival servers such as Insignia which has restored online functionality to the game.

There are 6 Game Modes in these Spy vs. Spy matches: Team Hack, Deathmatch, Team Deathmatch, Key Run, Sam Vs. All, and Countdown. Team Hack has players trying to retrieve data by hacking into enemies' computers and securing their own computers, similar to "Capture the Flag". Deathmatch and Team Deathmatches pit players against each other. Key Run is similar to Team Hack, except retrieving a Key to hack into the other team's computer is the main item to capture. Sam Vs. All is reminiscent to Metal Gear Solid 3: Subsistence's Sneaking Mission game mode, in which one player who is Sam Fisher must play as a lone wolf and hack into computers defended by an Upsilon spy team. However, the key difference is that Fisher lacks the equipment from the single-player mode, and is nearly identical to normal spies. Countdown is similar to Deathmatch, except players must outlast each other by getting more kills to extend their time limit.

==== Co-op ====
Like Chaos Theory, cooperative missions are available that tie in directly to the storyline. They have the spies provide covert support for Fisher, either helping him with his objectives or acting on intelligence he has gathered. The first mission takes place in Iceland shortly after Sam is pulled out. The spies are sent in to complete Fisher's mission by blowing up the plant. Next, the spies go to Ellsworth Prison to start a riot, providing a distraction to allow Fisher and Jamie Washington to escape. Thanks to intelligence provided by Fisher, the spies are able to sabotage the chemical bunker in Kinshasa owned by Tafkir and Massoud, as well as getting valuable intel. The last mission happens in conjunction with Fisher taking down the JBA. The Splinter Cell duo, under the command of Assistant Director Williams, sabotages multiple Red Mercury bombs on a cargo ship heading for Los Angeles.

== Soundtrack ==
Michael McCann (under the alias Behavior) was lead composer for the game's soundtrack. For the Ubisoft Shanghai version, McCann composed all music, except the Main Theme, which was composed by veterans Cris Velasco and Sascha Dikiciyan. McCann released the majority of the body of music composed for the game via his website for free. For the Generation Six version, McCann handled all music except the cinematics, which were composed by Velasco and Dikiciyan.

== Reception ==
Reception

Aggregate scores
Aggregator	Score
GameRankings	(Xbox) 89.31% (X360) 85.12% (PS2) 84.40% (PC) 81.32% (PS3) 78.94% (GC) 64% (Wii) 61.36%
Metacritic	(Xbox) 89/100 (X360) 85/100 (PS2) 84/100 (PC) 80/100 (PS3) 78/100 (GC) 64/100 (Wii) 61/100

Review scores
Publication	Score
Edge	8/10
Electronic Gaming Monthly	8.33/10
Eurogamer	(X360) 9/10 (PS3) 8/10
Game Informer	9/10
GamePro	(X360) 4.25/5 (Wii) 3/5
GameRevolution	B+
GameSpot	8.5/10 (PS2) 8.2/10 (PC & PS3) 8/10 (Wii) 6.2/10 (GC) 6.1/10
GameSpy	(Xbox) 4.5/5; 4/5 (PC & GC) 2.5/5
GameTrailers	8.9/10
GameZone	(X360) 9.2/10 (PC) 8.1/10
IGN	9/10 (PS2) 8.7/10 (Mobile & PS3) 7.9/10 (Wii) 5.5/10
Nintendo Power	(Wii) 6/10 (GC) 4.5/10
Official Xbox Magazine (US)	9/10
PC Gamer (US)	68%
The Sydney Morning Herald	5/5
USA Today	9/10

Reception of the game ranged from positive to mixed. GameRankings and Metacritic gave it a score of 89.31% and 89 out of 100 for the Xbox version; 85.12% and 85 out of 100 for the Xbox 360 version; 84.40% and 84 out of 100 for the PlayStation 2 version; 81.32% and 80 out of 100 for the PC version; 78.94% and 78 out of 100 for the PlayStation 3 version; 64% and 64 out of 100 for the GameCube version; and 61.36% and 61 out of 100 for the Wii version.

The Sydney Morning Herald gave the X360 version all five stars and said it "could be a contender for game of the year." The Times gave it a very favorable review and called it "sweaty-palmed fun, teaming the adult joys of a well-paced thriller with the childish delight of playing hide-and-seek in the dark." USA Today gave the game nine stars out of ten and said, "Regardless whether he's the hero or villain, Sam Fisher is impressive, and should have fans yearning for another sequel."

Hyper's Dylan Burns commended the game for its great looks, "moral ramifications [and] branching objectives". However, he criticised it for the "same old trial and error gameplay, it's over too quickly".

In 2016, PC Gamer listed the PC version of Double Agent as one of the worst PC ports.

=== Awards and nominations ===
- Received IGN's award for Best Xbox Action Game of 2006
- Received IGN's award for "Best Original Score of 2006" for the Xbox 360
- Nominated by the Academy of Interactive Arts & Sciences for "Action/Adventure Game of the Year", "Outstanding Achievement in Character Performance - Male" (Michael Ironside as Sam Fisher), "Outstanding Achievement in Sound Design", and "Outstanding Achievement in Original Music Composition" at the 10th Annual Interactive Achievement Awards
- Won TeamXbox's "Best Action Game" and "Game of the Year" for the Xbox version
- Won GameSpy's "Game of the Year" and "Best Action Game" for the Xbox version
- Won Official Xbox Magazine's Action-Adventure Game of the Year - February 2007
- Won Official Xbox Magazine's Co-op Game of the Year - February 2007
