= Splinter Cell: Deathwatch =

Animated television series

- Also known as: Tom Clancy's Splinter Cell: Deathwatch
- Genre: Action; Spy fiction; Adult animation
- Created by: Derek Kolstad
- Based on: Tom Clancy's Splinter Cell by Ubisoft
- Directed by: Guillaume Dousse
- Voices of: Liev Schreiber; Kirby
- Music by: Danny Bensi & Saunder Jurriaans; Chase Deso
- Countries of origin: France; Denmark; United States
- Original language: English
- No. of seasons: 1
- No. of episodes: 8

Production
- Executive producers: Derek Kolstad; Gérard Guillemot; Hélène Juguet; Hugo Revon
- Producers: Gérard Guillemot; Hélène Juguet; Hugo Revon
- Editor: Thomas Belair
- Running time: 20–27 minutes
- Production companies: Tradecraft; Sun Creature Studio; FOST Studio; Ubisoft Film & Television; Netflix Animation Studios

Original release
- Network: Netflix
- Release: October 14, 2025 – present

Splinter Cell: Deathwatch is an adult animated espionage action television series created by Derek Kolstad, based on the Tom Clancy's Splinter Cell video game franchise by Ubisoft. The series stars Liev Schreiber as the voice of Sam Fisher alongside Kirby as Zinnia McKenna. It is directed by Sun Creature Studio co-founder Guillaume Dousse and produced by Ubisoft Film & Television while animation services are provided by FOST Studio.

The series premiered on October 14, 2025, on Netflix. A day after the premiere, the series was renewed for a second season.

== Voice cast and characters ==
=== Main ===
- Liev Schreiber as Sam Fisher, a retired field agent who initially served as a Splinter Cell operative for the Third Echelon sub-division of the NSA. He eventually became the spymaster and commander of the covert Fourth Echelon counter-terrorism unit, (Note: As depicted in Tom Clancy's Splinter Cell: Blacklist (2013)) which answers directly to the President of the United States. Fisher was previously voiced by Michael Ironside and Eric Johnson in the video games
- Kirby as Zinnia McKenna, a Splinter Cell field operative of Fourth Echelon

=== Supporting ===
- Janet Varney as Anna Grímsdóttir, the former chief technical analyst of Third Echelon and the former technical operations officer of Fourth Echelon who became its commander following Fisher's retirement. Grímsdóttir was previously voiced by Claudia Besso, Adriana Anderson, and Kate Drummond in the video games
- Helen Hong as Jo Ahn, the technical operations officer of Fourth Echelon
- Joel Oulette as Thunder, a skilled Canadian hacker whom Grímsdóttir recruits to join Fourth Echelon
- Kari Wahlgren as Diana Shetland, the CEO of Displace International, a former private military company that is involved in clean energy production
- Aleks Le as Charlie Shetland, Diana's half-brother
- Kiff VandenHeuvel as Douglas Shetland, Diana and Charlie's father, and a former close friend of Fisher who he served alongside in the Navy SEALs. Shetland founded Displace International after he was dishonorably discharged and was killed by Fisher after attempting to instigate a world war. (Note: As depicted in Tom Clancy's Splinter Cell: Chaos Theory (2005)) Shetland was previously voiced by Marcel Jeannin in the video games
- Bella Dayne as Freya Niemeyer, the second-in-command of Karimi's unit
  - Dayne also voices Milena, one of Diana's employees
- Navid Negahban as Reza "Gunther" Karimi, the leader of a mercenary unit working for Diana
- JB Blanc as Thomas, Diana's personal assistant

== Episodes ==
No.	Title	Written by	Original release date
1	"Up from the Grave"	Derek Kolstad	October 14, 2025
2	"Dinner First, Talk Later"	David Daitch & Katie J. Stone	October 14, 2025
3	"Welcome to the 4th Echelon"	David Daitch & Katie J. Stone	October 14, 2025
4	"Scars of Bagram"	David Daitch & Katie J. Stone	October 14, 2025
5	"Simple as That"	Naomi Davis and Matias Wulff	October 14, 2025
6	"The Man Is the Mission"	Naomi Davis and Matias Wulff	October 14, 2025
7	"Chaos Theory: Part 1"	Derek Kolstad	October 14, 2025
8	"Chaos Theory: Part 2"	Derek Kolstad	October 14, 2025

== Production ==
In July 2020, it was revealed that Ubisoft Film & Television was developing an animated adaptation of the Tom Clancy's Splinter Cell video game franchise for Netflix. Derek Kolstad was hired to serve as the lead writer for the series, which was initially reported to have received a two-season order but Kolstad later stated that only the first season had been green-lit and that it would take a few years before the series was released. Kolstad imagined the series with an older Sam Fisher, and he wrote the story such that the history behind the games was canon for the show. He also maintained the clandestine feel from the games by utilizing long periods of silence before sudden bursts of action.

In August 2024, Michael Ironside, who had previously voiced Sam Fisher in the video games, stated that he was too old to portray the character for television and that Liev Schreiber had taken over the role for the series. This was confirmed the following month, when Netflix released a first look of the series and announced Schrieber's casting. Animation was provided by the Danish/French Sun Creature Studio and the French studio Fost. Guillaume Dousse began working on the series at Sun Creature as a creative director, and as development progressed, his responsibilities grew to director of some episodes and then the whole first season. The scale of the production was too large for Sun Creature, so most production animation was done at Fost, where Dousse worked with co-director Félicien Colmet-Daâge to lead that aspect.

On October 15, 2025, Netflix renewed the series for a second season.

== Release ==
The series premiered on Netflix on October 14, 2025.

== Reception ==
On the review aggregator website Rotten Tomatoes, the series holds an approval rating of 86%, based on 14 reviews. Metacritic, which uses a weighted average, assigned a score of 70 out of 100, based on 4 critics, indicating "generally favorable" reviews.

The series was nominated for "Best Adaptation" at The Game Awards 2025.
