= Tom Clancy's Splinter Cell =

Stealth video game series

- Genres: Action-adventure; Stealth
- Developers: Ubisoft Montreal; Ubisoft Milan; Ubisoft Shanghai; Ubisoft Toronto; Gameloft; Red Storm Entertainment
- Publishers: Ubisoft; Microsoft Game Studios; Gameloft; Aspyr Media
- Platforms: Xbox; Windows; PlayStation 2; GameCube; Game Boy Advance; Mobile phone; N-Gage; OS X; Nintendo DS; PlayStation Portable; Xbox 360; Wii; PlayStation 3; iOS; Nintendo 3DS; Android; Windows Phone; Wii U
- First release: Splinter Cell; November 18, 2002
- Latest release: Splinter Cell: Blacklist; August 20, 2013

Tom Clancy's Splinter Cell is a series of action-adventure games, the first of which was released in 2002, and their tie-in novels that were endorsed by Tom Clancy. The series follows Sam Fisher, a highly trained agent of a fictional black-ops sub-division within the NSA, dubbed "Third Echelon", as he overcomes his adversaries. The games emphasize light and darkness as gameplay elements.

There have been six main games in the series: Splinter Cell (2002), Pandora Tomorrow (2004), Chaos Theory (2005), Double Agent (2006), Conviction (2010) and Blacklist (2013). Additionally, Essentials, a PlayStation Portable exclusive, was released in 2006 and Classic Trilogy HD, a remastered compilation of the first three games, was released for the PlayStation 3 in 2011. A remake of the first game is in development. Nine tie-in novels have been released. An eight-episode audio drama, Splinter Cell: Firewall, debuted in December 2022 and an animated series, Splinter Cell: Deathwatch, premiered on Netflix in October 2025.

The series has been positively received, and was once considered to be one of Ubisoft's flagship franchises. The series had sold 19 million units by 2008 and 32 million by 2016.

== Games ==
Release timeline
2002	Splinter Cell
2003
2004	Pandora Tomorrow
2005	Chaos Theory
2006	Essentials
2006	Double Agent
2007–2009
2010	Conviction
2011	Classic Trilogy HD
2012
2013	Blacklist
TBA	Splinter Cell: Remake

=== Tom Clancy's Splinter Cell (2002) ===
Tom Clancy's Splinter Cell was developed over a period of two years and developed by Ubisoft Montreal with original publishing by Microsoft Game Studios for the Xbox as an exclusive title. Later in 2003, Ubisoft ported the game to Microsoft Windows, Mac, PlayStation 2, GameCube, and Game Boy Advance. Inspired by the Metal Gear series, it uses an Unreal Engine 2 that was modified to allow light-and-dark based gameplay.

=== Tom Clancy's Splinter Cell: Pandora Tomorrow (2004) ===
Pandora Tomorrow was developed by Ubisoft Shanghai and Ubisoft Milan and introduced multiplayer gameplay to the series. In single-player mode, the game AI adapts to adjust to the player's skill level. Unlike other games in the series, which generally lean towards information-based threats, the plot of Pandora Tomorrow focuses on biological warfare, in which an Indonesian terrorist group threatens to infect people with the smallpox virus. Fisher is also given new abilities like SWAT turns and whistling to attract enemies' attention. It also introduced a revolutionary new online mode called spies versus mercenaries, in which one team would play from a third person perspective on the spy team, and the more guns-blazing first-person perspective of the mercenaries.

=== Tom Clancy's Splinter Cell: Chaos Theory (2005) ===
Ubisoft Montreal and Ubisoft Milan were again responsible for the third game in the series, Chaos Theory. It adds a cooperative multiplayer mode. Originally announced to be released in Fall 2004, its initial releases were made at the end of March 2005. The Unreal Engine was heavily modified, this time from version 2.5. The game includes a number of new features, including adding a combat knife to the player's inventory. Maps are also more open with multiple ways of achieving the end goal.

=== Tom Clancy's Splinter Cell: Essentials (2006) ===
Essentials extends the Splinter Cell series to the PlayStation Portable. Through a series of flashback missions, the player learns more about Fisher's backstory. The game was less positively received critically than previous installments, with criticism aimed at the control mechanics and the multiplayer mode.

=== Tom Clancy's Splinter Cell: Double Agent (2006) ===
For the series' fourth installment, Double Agent, two separate versions were created, one for generation six consoles and the Wii, and the other for Xbox 360, Microsoft Windows, and PlayStation 3. Double Agent features a "trust system" that presents the player with moral dilemmas. It is the first game in the series with a hub-like area, where Sam can explore and do objectives between missions. This is also the only game in the series to have different endings based on player decisions, but only one ending is considered canon.

=== Tom Clancy's Splinter Cell: Conviction (2010) ===
Conviction was officially announced on May 23, 2007, when Ubisoft released a trailer for the game. The game was due for release on November 16, 2007. However, the game missed its initial launch date, and on May 19, 2008, it was reported that Conviction was "officially on hold" and that the game had been taken "back to the drawing board". Ubisoft announced that the game had been pushed back to the 2009–10 fiscal year. At E3 2009, the developers confirmed that the "new" Conviction had been in development since early 2008, commenting that "the gameplay has evolved a lot" and "the visual direction is simply much better". The game's release date was pushed back several times. On March 18, 2010, the demo was released for Xbox 360. Ubisoft wanted to make the fifth game more accessible, so Conviction was designed around the new core elements "Mark and Execute" and "Last Known Position", while stealth elements present in the previous games were omitted, such as the ability to whistle, lock pick, and hide bodies. Conviction uses a cover system and adds simple interrogation sequences to the series.

=== Tom Clancy's Splinter Cell: Classic Trilogy HD (2011) ===
In September 2011, a remastered compilation package was released for the PlayStation 3 that included the first three games in the series. The remastered versions are based on the PC ports of the originals. The compilation received "mixed or average" reviews on Metacritic.

=== Tom Clancy's Splinter Cell: Blacklist (2013) ===
Blacklist is the sixth installment in the series, developed by Ubisoft Toronto and was released on August 20, 2013. Blacklist boasts new features combining gameplay from Chaos Theory and Conviction. Series veteran Michael Ironside was replaced in his role as Sam Fisher by actor Eric Johnson. In the game, Fisher has been appointed as the commander of the new "Fourth Echelon", a clandestine unit that answers solely to the President of the United States. He has denied any existence of the agency and Fourth Echelon is working to stop a new terror plot, known as the 'Blacklist'. Fourth Echelon also has the secondary objective of stopping all operations in which Third Echelon is still running. Features returning include a moving "Mark and Execute", Fisher's signature goggles and a new knife, the Karambit, and the ability to perform "abduction" stealth melee takedowns.

=== Future ===
At E3 2017 regarding Splinter Cell, Ubisoft CEO Yves Guillemot stated: "I can't say much about that. But, for sure, all the Clancy games are taken care of. It's just we have quite a lot on our plate at the moment...All the Clancy games are really coming along, so we are not forgetting Splinter Cell."

In May 2019, Julian Gerighty, Ubisoft Creative Director, announced on his social media page that a Splinter Cell game was in development. In his statement, he said he had been working on the game with Ubisoft Montreal creative director, Roman Campos-Oriola, and executive producer Dan Hay. However, Ubisoft later disputed this.

On 16 September 2020, it was announced at Facebook Connect that a virtual reality version of the series is coming exclusively to the Oculus VR platform. It was set to be developed by Red Storm Entertainment. On July 21, 2022, the game was cancelled.

In December 2021, Ubisoft revealed that they are developing a remake of the first game. In October 2022, David Grivel, the director of the game, left Ubisoft, and returned in December 2025 after a short tenure working on other titles.

== Novels ==
=== Tom Clancy's Splinter Cell (2004) ===
Splinter Cell is the first installment of a series of novels based on the video game series. It was written by Raymond Benson under the pseudonym David Michaels. The plot follows Sam Fisher as he investigates a terrorist group called "The Shadows" and a related arms-dealing organization named "The Shop". Members of "The Shop" use inside information to attempt to kill "Third Echelon" members, including Fisher. Shortly after its publication in December 2004, it spent three weeks on the New York Times list of bestsellers. It also made it to the list of Wall Street Journal mass-market paperback bestsellers.

=== Tom Clancy's Splinter Cell: Operation Barracuda (2005) ===
In Operation Barracuda, which was released on November 1, 2005, Raymond Benson (again as David Michaels) continues the story of the first Splinter Cell novel. The book was also featured on the New York Times bestseller list.

=== Tom Clancy's Splinter Cell: Checkmate (2006) ===
For Checkmate, Grant Blackwood took over as author behind the David Michaels pseudonym, Benson having declared that he was "finished with Splinter Cell". Unlike the first two books, Checkmate is not written from the first person perspective of Fisher, nor does Checkmate continue the running subplots that were established in the previous book. This novel was released on November 7, 2006.

The book begins with a ship by the name of Trego sailing towards the American East Coast. Sam Fisher is called in from a training mission to disable the ship. After Fisher stops the ship from irradiating the American West Coast with nuclear waste, he is informed that a town by the name of Slipstone has been attacked with a radiological weapon and over 5,000 people are dead. These events lead Fisher to Ukraine, Iran, Dubai, and Ashgabat, Turkmenistan.

=== Tom Clancy's Splinter Cell: Fallout (2007) ===
On November 6, 2007, Fallout, was published, Blackwood's second Splinter Cell novel and the fourth in the series. Like the previous novel, it was written by Grant Blackwood, under the pseudonym David Michaels. The story follows Sam Fisher as he combats Islamic fundamentalists who have taken over the government of Kyrgyzstan.

=== Tom Clancy's Splinter Cell: Conviction (2009) ===
Conviction is the tie-in novel to the game with the same name. It was published on November 3, 2009, and was written by Peter Telep under the name David Michaels. It was published by Berkley Books, under Penguin Group. The book follows Sam Fisher after the killing of Lambert. Fisher is on the run and has "gone rogue," as he is believed to be a treasonous agent. He is chased by a team of rookie Splinter Cells led by Ben Hansen.

=== Tom Clancy's Splinter Cell: Endgame (2009) ===
Endgame, published on December 1, 2009, is the counterpart to the Conviction novel. The plot runs parallel to the Conviction novel, but from the point of view of Fisher's antagonists. The story is told from the perspective of Ben Hansen and the rest of the team pursuing Fisher.

=== Tom Clancy's Splinter Cell Blacklist: Aftermath (2013) ===
Published in October 2013, this tie-in novel takes place after the events of the video game Tom Clancy's Splinter Cell: Blacklist. It involves Fisher and Fourth Echelon finding and rescuing a Russian billionaire who disobeyed orders from the Kremlin to release a computer virus against the United States. Aftermath is written by Peter Telep and the first in the series to be authored without the use of the David Michaels pseudonym.

=== Tom Clancy's Splinter Cell: Firewall (2022) ===
Firewall was released on March 1 for Kindle and on March 15 for paperback. It was written by James Swallow and features Sam Fisher's daughter, Sarah, working alongside her father. The plot involves Fisher dealing with a cyberwarfare technology known as "Gordian Sword" which is capable of defeating any firewall and will be auctioned to the highest bidder regardless of their motives for using it. Fisher must stop the technology being used or sold before it falls into the hands of terrorists, criminals, or rogue states. The book won the Scribe Award for Best Original Novel.

=== Tom Clancy's Splinter Cell: Dragonfire (2023) ===
Dragonfire was released on January 24 for Kindle and on the same day for paperback. It was written by James Swallow and it features Sam Fisher's daughter, Sarah, working alongside her father and Isaac Briggs. The plot involves Fisher working behind enemy lines in North Korea while his daughter searches for him all the while trying to expose the sinister scheme of the conspirators known as The Dragons.

== Common elements ==
=== Plot and themes ===
The first game explains that "Splinter Cell" refers to an elite recon-type unit of single covert operatives (such as Sam Fisher) who are supported in the field by a high-tech remote team.

In the first three games (Splinter Cell, Pandora Tomorrow, Chaos Theory), terrorists are planning attacks, usually by use of information warfare, which Fisher, an operative for Third Echelon, a secret branch of the NSA, must prevent. The missions range from gathering intelligence to capturing and/or eliminating terrorists.

In the fourth game, Double Agent, Fisher assumes the identity of a wanted criminal in order to infiltrate a terrorist ring.

The fifth game, Conviction, begins immediately after Double Agent. Having abandoned Third Echelon, Fisher discovers that the death of his daughter Sarah had not been an accident (as had been purported at the beginning of Double Agent), leading him to strike out on his own in search of those responsible, until his investigation uncovers a conspiracy within his old agency.

In the sixth and most recent game, Blacklist, Third Echelon has been disbanded by the President of the United States. A new outfit, Fourth Echelon, is formed by the President and placed under the command of Fisher with the mission of stopping the 'Blacklist' attacks and the Engineers, the organization behind them. Blacklist deals with the morality of war and how far Fisher and his team go in order to prevent these plots against America.

=== Characters ===
The characters of the games, as well as the organization Third Echelon, were created by J. T. Petty. The main recurring ones are:

- Sam Fisher is the main protagonist of the series.
- Irving Lambert, director of Third Echelon, serves as the player's guide by leading Fisher through the games' missions, until he is killed by Sam in Double Agent.
- Anna "Grim" Grímsdóttir is portrayed as an official Third Echelon hacker and analyst, who helps Fisher when technical obstacles need to be overcome. In Conviction she takes over the role of guide from the deceased Lambert; her character also becomes the source of dramatic tension in the story. In Blacklist, she is the technical operations officer and butts heads with Sam over morality, ethics, and Fourth Echelon's operating parameters.
- Sarah Fisher, Sam's daughter and sole family member. She was presumed to be killed in Double Agent, but Conviction revealed her murder to be a deception.

=== Gameplay ===
The stealth element of the game allows Fisher to hide in the shadows and become almost invisible. Guards may be assassinated by unsuppressed or silenced weapons, gadgets, or hand-to-hand combat. However, the encouraged way to progress through the first three games is to remain hidden, select non-obvious routes, and utilize diversions to pass guards. The first game in the series only features a single-player mode. Pandora Tomorrow introduces a two-on-two multiplayer mode. Chaos Theory further develops that mode and introduces a cooperative mode. Cooperative mode plays similarly to the single-player mode, but adds situations that can only be overcome as a team. The cooperative storylines in Chaos Theory and the sixth generation version of Double Agent parallel those of Fisher's actions in the single-player modes, letting players act on information he obtained or provide support in the field.

In Double Agent, Fisher may now receive conflicting objectives from his superiors and the terrorists. For example, the terrorists may order him to bomb a ship while the NSA requires him to prevent the bombing. This creates a delicate balancing act between gaining the trust of the terrorists and fulfilling the mission assignments. Fisher must not expose himself as a double agent (e.g., let himself be seen with an NSA gadget); otherwise, he will lose instantly.

Conviction utilises a much faster and more violent form of stealth action gameplay than previous games in the series. It retains the cooperative multiplayer mode of the two preceding games. The weapons that Sam Fisher uses are based more accurately on real-world firearms. Each weapon may receive up to three upgrades, which manifest as a silencer, gun sight, upgraded ammo, or laser attachment. After completing a hand-to-hand kill, the player is provided with a bonus that allows the player to mark two to four targets (depending on the weapon selected), such as enemies or objects, and dispatch them all swiftly in a slow-motion sequence. Interactive interrogation cutscenes where Fisher beats up a target for information do not require the player to do anything other than press [Interrogate]. If the player is near an interactive object, such as a television or table, Fisher may use that to alter the standard animation.

Blacklist consolidates the playstyle of all previous games in a point-based system. The player gains points toward one of the three available styles: The Ghost style requires absolute stealth and no enemy deaths. The Panther style favors stealthy killing. The Assault style demands loud firefights and high-explosive grenades. Points earned toward each style can be spent on weapons and equipment suitable for that style. The game retains the execution system from its predecessor, but allows the player to mark up to three targets, regardless of the weapon.

== Development and history ==
=== Origin ===
Although the series features his name, Tom Clancy had little to no involvement in the development of any of the installments. According to series producer Mathieu Ferland, the original game was developed so that Ubisoft's Montreal studio could demonstrate its full potential. After Tom Clancy's Rainbow Six and Tom Clancy's Ghost Recon, "special ops was the natural next step" for Clancy-endorsed games.

=== Graphics and technology ===
The first game in the series modified the Unreal Engine to allow the light-and-dark-based gameplay style. The other games continued this, using updated versions of the engine.

By the release of the latest game – Blacklist – the engine had been upgraded to the LEAD engine, a heavily modified version of the Unreal Engine 2.5. The game had active shadows on all consoles not simply as a graphical function – as in most games – but as a gameplay enhancer for the sake of the game's stealth features. This meant that more coding for the game was required and overall, required a powerful desktop computer in order to get the best clarity and performance.

== Reception ==
Aggregate review scores
Game	Metacritic
Splinter Cell	(GBA) 77/100 (GC) 89/100 (PC) 91/100 (PS2) 89/100 (Xbox) 93/100
Pandora Tomorrow	(GBA) 68/100 (GC) 78/100 (PC) 87/100 (PS2) 87/100 (Xbox) 93/100
Chaos Theory	(3DS) 53/100 (GC) 81/100 (NDS) 50/100 (PC) 92/100 (PS2) 87/100 (Xbox) 94/100
Essentials	(PSP) 58/100
Double Agent	(GC) 64/100 (PC) 80/100 (PS2) 84/100 (PS3) 78/100 (Wii) 61/100 (Xbox) 89/100 (X360) 85/100
Conviction	(PC) 83/100 (X360) 85/100
Classic Trilogy HD	(PS3) 67/100
Blacklist	(PC) 82/100 (PS3) 84/100 (WIIU) 75/100 (X360) 82/100

By the end of 2004, sales of the Splinter Cell series totaled 9.6 million units. By October 2005, the series' global sales had surpassed 12.5 million units. By May 2008, the series had sold 19 million units. As of 2016, over 32 million units have been sold.

== Other media ==
=== Radio drama ===
A radio drama for BBC Radio 4 Limelight called Tom Clancy's Splinter Cell: Firewall was released 2 December 2022 and was adapted by Sebastian Baczkiewicz and Paul Cornell from the novel of the same name by James Swallow. It is an eight part series that follows the plot of the novel of the same name. It was recorded with binaural audio which is ideal for a headphone listening experience. The main voice actors include Andonis Anthony as Sam Fisher (replacing Michael Ironside as the traditional voice actor for the character), as well as Will Poulter, Daisy Head, Rosalie Craig, Sacha Dhawan, and Nikesh Patel. Other actors include Mihai Arsene, Olga Fedori, Rina Mahoney, Roger Ringrose, Riad Richie, David Hounslow, Tijan Sarr, Tom Kiteley, Joe Belham, Ali Gadema, Lloyd Thomas, and Charis Jardim-Hinds. The series won the Scribe Award for Best Audio Drama.

=== Animated series ===
In late July 2020, streaming service Netflix announced that an anime series adaptation was in the works from Ubisoft Film & Television. John Wick writer Derek Kolstad served as executive producer on the series, while the animation was created by Sun Creature Studio and Fost. The series premiered on Netflix on October 14, 2025. A second season is in production.

=== Film adaptation ===
An earlier film adaptation was developed by Paramount Pictures beginning in 2004. In December of that year, Paramount acquired the film rights to Tom Clancy's Splinter Cell, with Peter Berg attached to direct and co-write the screenplay alongside J. T. Petty, a writer of the video games, and John J. McLaughlin. The film was intended to follow government agent Sam Fisher as he infiltrated an international terrorist organization, while also introducing a new character to the franchise.

Shortly after the announcement, Thomas Jane was reported as a leading candidate to portray Fisher. Berg also considered Mark Wahlberg, Kurt Russell, and Eric Bana for the role, although he stated that he had not contacted any of the actors because the project was still in its early stages. Berg also planned to meet with Tom Clancy and then-Central Intelligence Agency director Porter Goss as part of his research for the film.

By August 2005, DreamWorks Pictures was in negotiations to acquire the film rights from Paramount. Berg had left the project, while Daniel Pyne was hired to write a new screenplay. The earlier version had reportedly been written by Berg, Petty, and McLaughlin. Michael Ovitz, who represented Tom Clancy, remained attached as a producer, while Yves Guillemot, the chief executive of Ubisoft, was attached as an executive producer.

In January 2006, Splinter Cell novelist Raymond Benson stated that, to his knowledge, Pyne's screenplay was completely original and was not based on any of the video games or his Splinter Cell novels. He said that the film's only major connection to the existing versions of the franchise would be the character of Sam Fisher. By this point, the project was in development at DreamWorks, with Berg no longer attached to direct.

In 2011, Ubisoft announced that Tom Clancy's Splinter Cell, Tom Clancy's Ghost Recon, and Assassin's Creed were all planned to receive film adaptations. The company officially stated, "We want to keep ownership, retain control over the film content, and we're open to work with studios on the development of our projects, and eventually collaborate on the pre-casting, pre-budget and script." The following year, it was reported that Warner Bros. Pictures and Paramount Pictures were the front-runners bidding to make a Splinter Cell film. By November, it was announced that British actor Tom Hardy was cast as Sam Fisher, while Eric Warren Singer was hired as screenwriter. By 2013, Ubisoft announced that the film would be made by New Regency, with Basil Iwanyk signed on as producer through his production company, Thunder Road Films.

In March 2014, Doug Liman joined the production as director, with Jean-Julien Baronnet and David Bartis attached as producers. Later that month, Sheldon Turner was brought into the production team, to write a new draft of the script. Hardy told Collider in an interview that the studio was hoping to start filming that August. By June that year, Liman stated that both he and Hardy were working on the film's script, which would focus on a young Sam Fisher, in his prime as opposed to the portrayal of a seasoned spy in the video games. In October of the same year, Iwanyk stated that filming would start in early 2015.

In April 2015, Liman stepped down as director, with reports stating that the studio were talking with Joseph Kahn as his replacement. By July, Ubisoft hired Frank John Hughes to rewrite the film's script. In January 2017, Iwanyk confirmed that the script had been completed and sent to Hardy to read over. The producer explained that the film was intended to have its own style within the action movie genre, and that the production team was aiming to make an "edgy" PG-13 rated film. However, on November 15, 2024, it was announced that the film has been cancelled, citing issues getting the script and budget up to the standard they desired. on December 2, 2025 Insider account @MyTimeToShineHello posted on X (Formerly Twitter), "A Splinter Cell live action project is back in development!" The post did not include details about the format, studio, or production timeline.
