= Tom Clancy's Splinter Cell: Essentials =

2006 video game

- Developer: Ubisoft Montreal
- Publisher: Ubisoft
- Producer: Jean-François Mailloux
- Designer: Fabrice Cuny
- Programmer: Michel Salvado
- Artist: Cristelle Khatiri
- Writer: Michael Brooks Lee
- Composers: Guy Dubuc; Marc Lessard
- Series: Tom Clancy's Splinter Cell
- Engine: Unreal Engine 2
- Platform: PlayStation Portable
- Release: NA: March 21, 2006; AU: April 6, 2006; EU: April 7, 2006
- Genres: Action-adventure, stealth
- Modes: Single-player, multiplayer

Tom Clancy's Splinter Cell: Essentials is a 2006 action-adventure stealth game developed by Ubisoft Montreal and published by Ubisoft. It is part of the Splinter Cell series and was released for the PlayStation Portable handheld system on March 21, 2006. It is the fourth entry in the series and runs on the Unreal Engine 2.

== Development ==
Ubisoft Montreal had been in development of Splinter Cell: Essentials from at least 2005, with Ubisoft Montreal officially announcing the game on January 12, 2006. Once announced, Ubisoft Montreal provided additional details regarding the gameplay, story and more as it was scheduled for spring of 2006. Following the announcement, previews of the game were shown to journalists as more info regarding specific missions and returning features from the classic Splinter Cell series were included in the game. It was revealed that Ubisoft Montreal utilized the Unreal Engine 2 for Essentials, but toned down to run properly on the PlayStation Portable.

== Plot ==
In January 2009, Sam Fisher, a former NSA agent-turned-fugitive, sneaks into a Washington, D.C. cemetery where his daughter, Sarah, who has been recently killed by a drunk driver, is buried. Fisher is arrested at this grave site, taken into custody and interrogated at the NSA's headquarters in Fort Meade, Maryland. During this time, Fisher recalls past events, that are then played as missions.

The first flashback mission is set in Colombia back in 1992. Fisher is at this time a member of the Navy SEALs and his commanding officer, Douglas Shetland, has been captured by FARC guerrillas. Going against the direct order of the commanding officer, he performs a solo rescue mission of the commander. The second flashback sees Sam back at the GFO Oil Rig during the Georgian Information Crisis.

In the end, Fisher admits that he had killed his Third Echelon handler, Colonel Irving Lambert. In the final mission, Fisher steals the evidence and escapes from the NSA headquarters where he was being held.

== Reception ==
Reception

Aggregate scores
Aggregator	Score
GameRankings	58.22%
Metacritic	58/100

Review scores
Publication	Score
GameSpot	5.8/10
IGN	6.3/10

Critical reaction to Splinter Cell: Essentials was mixed. GameRankings gave it a score of 58.22%, while Metacritic gave it 58 out of 100.

Juan Castro of IGN gave the game a score of 6.3 out of 10, saying: "It feels rushed, even slightly broken during certain parts. Beyond this, the game plays as though it doesn't belong on the PSP. It yearns for a second analog stick and an extra pair of buttons, for instance. Not only that, it suffers quite a bit in the performance department—you'll rarely see the game running smoothly. Making matters worse is that Essentials doesn't look all that spectacular. This from a series that always pushes the boundaries of current technology."

Greg Mueller of GameSpot gave Essentials a score of 5.8 out of 10, saying: "Splinter Cell: Essentials sounds like a fine idea. Take some missions from previous games, mix them up a little, add some entirely new missions, and fit it all onto the PSP. Unfortunately, due to some bad controls, oppressively dark levels, and a worthless multiplayer mode, the result is a game that is more frustrating than it is rewarding."
