= Tom Clancy's Splinter Cell: Blacklist =

2013 video game

- Developer: Ubisoft Toronto
- Publisher: Ubisoft
- Directors: Maxime Béland; Patrick Redding
- Producers: Alexandre Parizeau; Andrew Wilson
- Designers: Laurent Malville; Nitai Bessette
- Artists: Scott Lee; Joshua Cook; Patrick Ingoldsby
- Writers: Richard Dansky; Matt MacLennan
- Composers: Mike Zarin; Tony Hajjar
- Series: Tom Clancy's Splinter Cell
- Platforms: PlayStation 3; Wii U; Windows; Xbox 360
- Release: NA: August 20, 2013; AU: August 22, 2013; EU: August 23, 2013
- Genres: Action-adventure, stealth
- Modes: Single-player, multiplayer

Tom Clancy's Splinter Cell: Blacklist is a 2013 action-adventure stealth game developed by Ubisoft Toronto and published for Playstation 3, Xbox 360, Wii U and Microsoft Windows by Ubisoft.

Additionally, the game can be purchased from the Xbox digital store and played on Xbox One and Xbox Series consoles through the Xbox backwards compatibility program.

The game is the sequel to Splinter Cell: Conviction and the seventh installment of the Splinter Cell series. Players control Sam Fisher, a highly trained operative working for the Fourth Echelon, in a mission to stop the Engineers, a group of terrorists which is trying to coerce the United States into recalling all of its troops stationed abroad. The gameplay is similar to its predecessors, with players tasked with completing objectives and defeating enemies. Blacklist marks the return of the asymmetrical multiplayer mode Spies vs. Mercs, which was introduced in Pandora Tomorrow.

Blacklist is the first title developed by Ubisoft Toronto, a studio founded by Ubisoft in 2009. The game was directed by Maxime Béland, who had worked on Conviction. The game endeavors to combine elements of its predecessors, including the action focus of Conviction and the stealth focus of the older games. To prepare for this game, Béland studied reviews and feature lists of the latter. Eric Johnson provides the voice and motion capture for Sam Fisher, replacing Michael Ironside, who did so for the previous games. The later-announced Wii U version was developed by Ubisoft Shanghai, which also developed the game's multiplayer.

Announced at E3 2012, Blacklist was released for PlayStation 3, Wii U, Windows, and Xbox 360 in August 2013. The game received generally positive reviews from critics when it was released, with praise for its level design, story, gameplay, combat, soundtrack, and multiplayer mode. However, criticism was directed at its graphics, lack of challenge, and ending. Further criticism was also directed from some fans towards Johnson's casting as Fisher. The game underperformed commercially, selling two million units within three months of its release.

== Gameplay ==
Screenshot of Fisher evading enemies by hanging from a building ledge

In Blacklist, players assume control of series protagonist Sam Fisher as he seeks to stop a terrorist group called the Engineers. The gameplay emphasizes stealth, and utilizes the third-person perspective. During the game, players can rotate its camera, run, crouch, and leap over obstacles. Since Blacklist intended to continue the "aggressive stealth" of Conviction while retaining the traditional stealth features of the older games, it combines action and stealth, and allows players to use different approaches and methods to complete objectives and defeat enemies. Players can complete levels without being noticed by any enemy by methods such as taking cover or scaling ledges. If the player chooses to kill enemies, other enemies are alerted when they see their companions' dead bodies. To avoid this, players can hide corpses. Fisher can also create a strategically advantageous dark environment by destroying nearby lights, and is equipped with customizable night-vision and sonar goggles to detect enemies in darkness and see through walls. He also has the Tri-Rotor, a compact surveillance drone which can spy on enemies, create distractions, give electric shocks, and self-destruct to kill enemies.

Players can play a more aggressive run-and-gun game by using gadgets and weapons to eliminate enemies. They can interact with environmental objects, such as ledges and zip-lines, to navigate levels. Conviction's mark-and-execute system returns in Blacklist, with refinements and additions to allow players to mark several targets. When they attack, they can kill all marked targets instantly. Improvements made the system work more fluidly. A variety of enemies (including soldiers and dogs) are encountered in the game, following the protagonist and alerting their companions. Players have the option to kill them, leave them untouched, or incapacitate them, and the game classifies their choices in one of three categories: Ghost (non-lethal, non-aggressive stealth), Panther (lethal, aggressive stealth), and Assault (loud, direct combat). Although the game has interrogation sequences involving questioning (or torturing) targets, it does not feature Conviction's interactive torture scenes. Players can still decide whether to spare their targets or kill them after interrogation,

The Paladin is the game's hub. Between missions, players can interact with crew members on the ship and view the game's objectives. Crew members also offer the protagonist side missions to complete. Before a mission Fisher can deploy the strategic mission interface, allowing players to see enemy positions and plan attacks and routes. Players can also use the interface to access multiplayer modes and missions. When players kill (or avoid) targets and complete objectives, experience points named "Ghost Points" and money are awarded to buy (or improve) weapons, and upgrade the Paladin airship and Sam's suit and equipment; the upgrades improve efficiency in completing missions. Experience gained depends on the difficulty level and how the game is played; the greater the stealth, the greater the reward. According to Ubisoft Toronto, the system, known as "universal economy", was intended to satisfy players; every action has a corresponding reward.

Blacklist has platform-specific features, including voice integration with Xbox 360's Kinect peripheral which allows players to distract enemies before attacking them or to call in an air strike. In the Wii U version, the GamePad's touchscreen is an interface, accessing gadgets and other features from the protagonist's arm-mounted computer (OPSAT), and incorporating screen and motion controls to highlight enemies with thermal vision when using Killing in Motion. The Wii U version was not shipped with the game's cooperative mode.

=== Multiplayer ===
The "Spies vs. Mercs" competitive mode introduced in Pandora Tomorrow again appears in Blacklist. An asymmetrical multiplayer mode, it pits two teams (with different gadgets, playing as spies or mercenaries) against each other. Spies, in third-person perspective, are equipped with smoke grenades and flashbangs and are tasked with hacking computer stations heavily guarded by mercenaries. Spies have more versatile movements as they can also climb onto rooftops, hide inside air vents and scale ledges. Mercenaries, in first person, can access lethal and longer-range weapons despite being unable to stealth-kill enemies or move very fast. The mode has two varieties: Classic, supporting teams of 2v2, and Blacklist, supporting 4v4 action. This mode features a progressive leveling system, allowing players to customise and upgrade the two character classes.

Blacklist also has a co-operative multiplayer mode, where each mission can be accessed by talking with the crew of the Paladin. Crew members offer a variety of missions and requirements for completing them, and players play as Fisher or his colleague Briggs; both have the same abilities. The mark-and-execute system works slightly differently in the cooperative mode, with enemies wearing helmets require both players to mark them before they can be killed. The cooperative mode has a total of 14 missions, with split-screen play supported. In addition to co-op and Spies vs. Mercs, Blacklist has other multiplayer modes including Uplink control, Team Deathmatch, and Extraction.

The game's multiplayer functionality was set to be shut down on September 1, 2022. The date was later delayed to October 1, 2022.

== Synopsis ==
=== Characters ===
Blacklist again features Sam Fisher (Eric Johnson), a former Third Echelon Splinter Cell agent who is now the spymaster and commander of the newly created Fourth Echelon. The game also sees the return of Fisher's old ally, Anna "Grim" Grímsdóttir (Kate Drummond), and new characters such as Isaac Briggs (Dwain Murphy) and Charlie Cole (David Reale). Several supporting characters from Conviction reappear, including Victor Coste (Howard Siegel), Patricia Caldwell (Mimi Kuzyk), and Andriy Kobin (Elias Toufexis), as well as Sarah Fisher (Victoria Sanchez), whose voice is heard in phone calls.

=== Plot ===
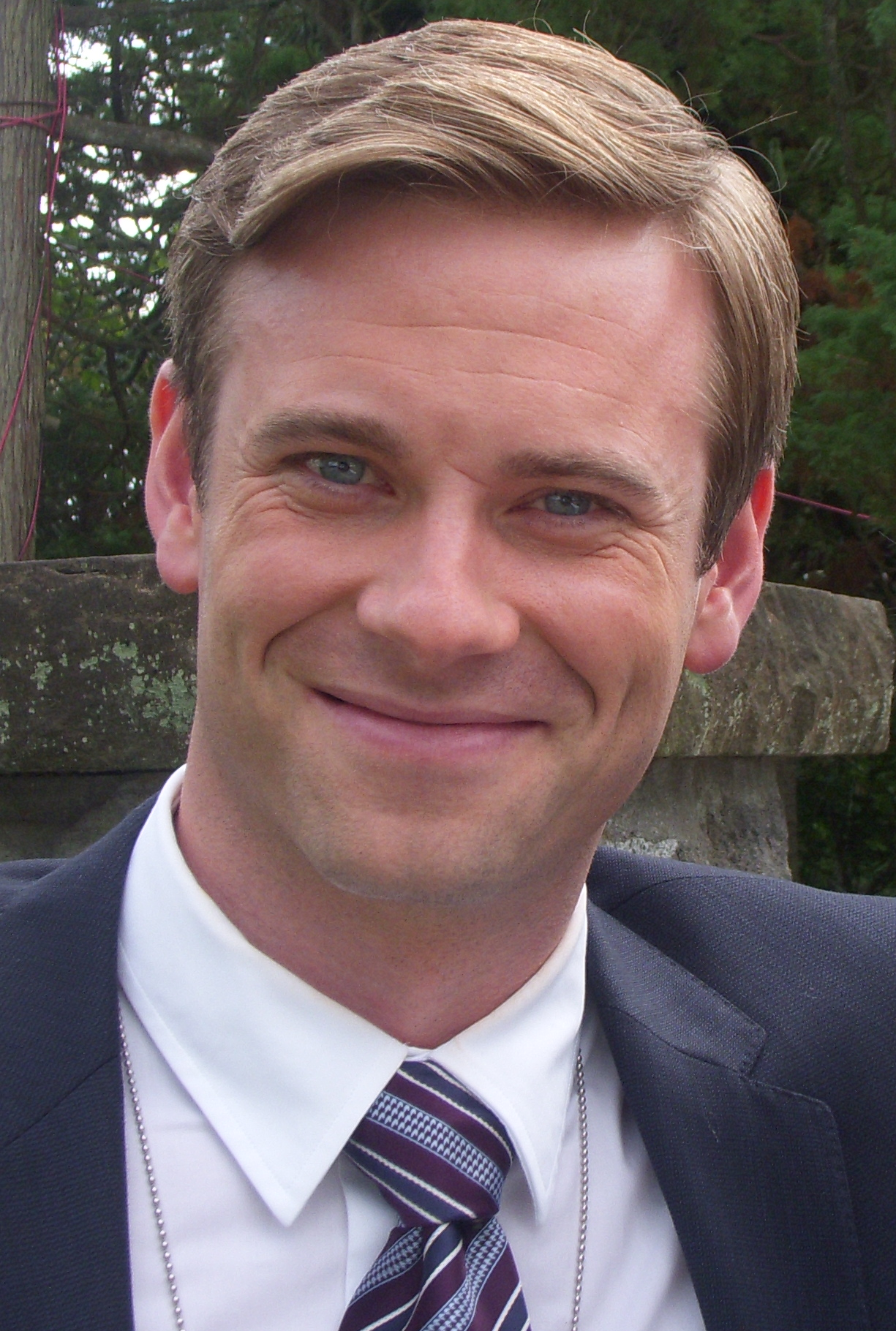
Eric Johnson replaced series veteran Michael Ironside and provided voice and motion capture for Sam Fisher.

Two years after Third Echelon is dissolved, Sam Fisher takes up work as a mercenary contractor with his friend Victor Coste. While working at Andersen Air Force Base in Guam, a highly organized force assaults the installation, destroying the base and killing hundreds of American servicemembers, including the base's commander. Coste is heavily injured in the attack. A faction known as the "Engineers" publicly declares their responsibility for the operation, announcing it will launch a "Blacklist" of attacks on the United States until it recalls its troops deployed abroad. In response, U.S. President Caldwell puts Sam in charge of "Fourth Echelon", a new top secret black-ops unit which operates out of a command and control aircraft known as the Paladin. The units members include tech specialist Charlie Cole, CIA operative Isaac Briggs, and analyst Anna Grímsdóttir.

Fourth Echelon traces the weapons used in the Guam attack to arms supplier Andriy Kobin, a former target of Sam's in Benghazi. Through him, the group traces his buyers to Iraq, whereupon Sam learns that the Engineers' leader is Majid Sadiq (Carlo Rota), a former MI6 agent who defected after he was involved in an American drone strike. Deducing that the Engineers are targeting Chicago, Sam breaks into the site of the operation and prevents a biological attack on the city's water systems.

Intel from Kobin connects the Engineers to mercenary broker Reza Nouri (Sam Kalilieh), whom Sam extracts from his estate in Paraguay before a team of Iranian Qods Force commandos can kill him. In London, Sam finds that the mercenaries Nouri hired out to the Engineers have been preparing VX nerve gas for their next attack. Sam also finds more evidence linking the Engineers to Qods Force, which is subsequently released to the public, causing anger in the US that brings America and Iran to the brink of war. Sam seeks to verify the Iranian connection by infiltrating the Qods Force headquarters in the former embassy of the United States in Tehran, where he finds intel exonerating Iran. Afterwards, Fourth Echelon successfully stops the next Blacklist operation, a chemical attack using the Philadelphia metro network.

After Nouri is captured by the CIA, Sam and Briggs infiltrate Guantanamo Bay detention camp, where they learn that Nouri has been providing false information to reignite American hostility towards Iran. Through interrogation and torture of Nouri, he reveals that Sadiq sought to distract the US government from an imminent assault on the Gulf Coast's fuel infrastructure. The Engineers use a modified Stuxnet virus to infect energy infrastructure and the Paladin, which disables fire systems and nearly crashes the plane. They have also captured the Sabine Pass LNG terminal. With the help of Navy SEALs, Sam successfully saves the terminal, preventing a chain reaction that would have ignited more facilities.

Fourth Echelon finds out that the Blacklist attacks were aimed at coercing the US president to start continuity-of-government procedures – Sadiq's real goal was to steal all of the government and military's key files after they are transferred to a secure bunker under the Denver International Airport, as part of COG procedures. Against the president's orders, Fourth Echelon breaks into the bunker after Sadiq's sleeper agents occupied it and took the Secretary of Defense hostage. The Engineers torture the Secretary into giving the files to Sadiq, but Briggs, exercising his "Fifth Freedom" (all means are acceptable), kills him before he could do so. Briggs is captured along with the remaining hostages. As Sadiq moves to escape using the Paladin, Sam, disguised as a hostage, helps Delta Force snipers kill Sadiq's men, before injuring Sadiq in a fight. Sadiq claims that his death will lead the United States into war with the nations secretly backing the Engineers, while his trial will lead to the America's secrets being leaked. Sam opts to use his "Fifth Freedom" to confine him. Caldwell publicly covers up Sadiq's imprisonment by falsely announcing his death. In a post-credits scene, while Fourth Echelon continues its work, a recovered Coste joins Sam, as they prepare to interrogate Sadiq.

=== Co-op missions ===
Intertwining with the main plot, the co-op missions begin with Sam and Briggs infiltrating a smuggling operation in Kashmir, after hearing rumors of a nuclear device being moved. Sam and Briggs discover intel connecting the smugglers to the Russian intelligence organization Voron, who are using the Blacklist attacks as distraction for their own activities. Following the lead, they find out that Voron is trying to frame India for an operation by acquiring its nukes. Sam and Briggs infiltrate a missile base in Bangalore, where they find that Voron agents have eliminated the base personnel and are removing warheads from a ballistic missile. After neutralizing the Russian agents, Sam and Briggs slip away as the remaining Voron soldiers are eliminated by Indian quick reaction forces.

Fourth Echelon traces the operation to a Voron station chief named Viktor Cherski, who had access to Third Echelon intel. Sam and Briggs infiltrate a Voron station in Chittagong, where they corner Cherski in his ops center. There, they breach into Cherski's panic room and restrain him. During interrogation Fourth Echelon extracts intel on a Russian facility in Koltsovo, but Cherski is killed in an ensuing struggle.

Acting on this intel, Sam and Briggs infiltrate the facility at Koltsovo, which is hidden underneath an abandoned Soviet-era hospital in the naukograd. They break into a cleanroom said to contain an OPSAT computer with Third Echelon intel. Instead, they find that the facility contains a man in a medically induced coma, who is Voron's real source. Rescuing the man, Sam and Briggs narrowly escape the base as it self-destructs and extract the patient to the Paladin. Grim identifies the man as former Voron agent Mikhail "Kestrel" Loskov (co-protagonist of the co-op campaign in Conviction). Kobin confirms his identity, noting that they have a "history". Kobin asks if Kestrel's gunshot wound has put him into a coma or paralyzed him. Sam observes that no one had told Kobin how Kestrel had been incapacitated.

Aside from co-op missions given by Briggs, other members of Fourth Echelon also give missions that can be completed either in co-op or alone. Grim provides infiltration and stealth missions targeting the Engineers' communications network, while Charlie gives missions in which Sam must hold out against waves of enemies to extract intelligence from dead drops. Kobin gives elimination missions in which Sam takes down groups of arms dealers.

== Development ==
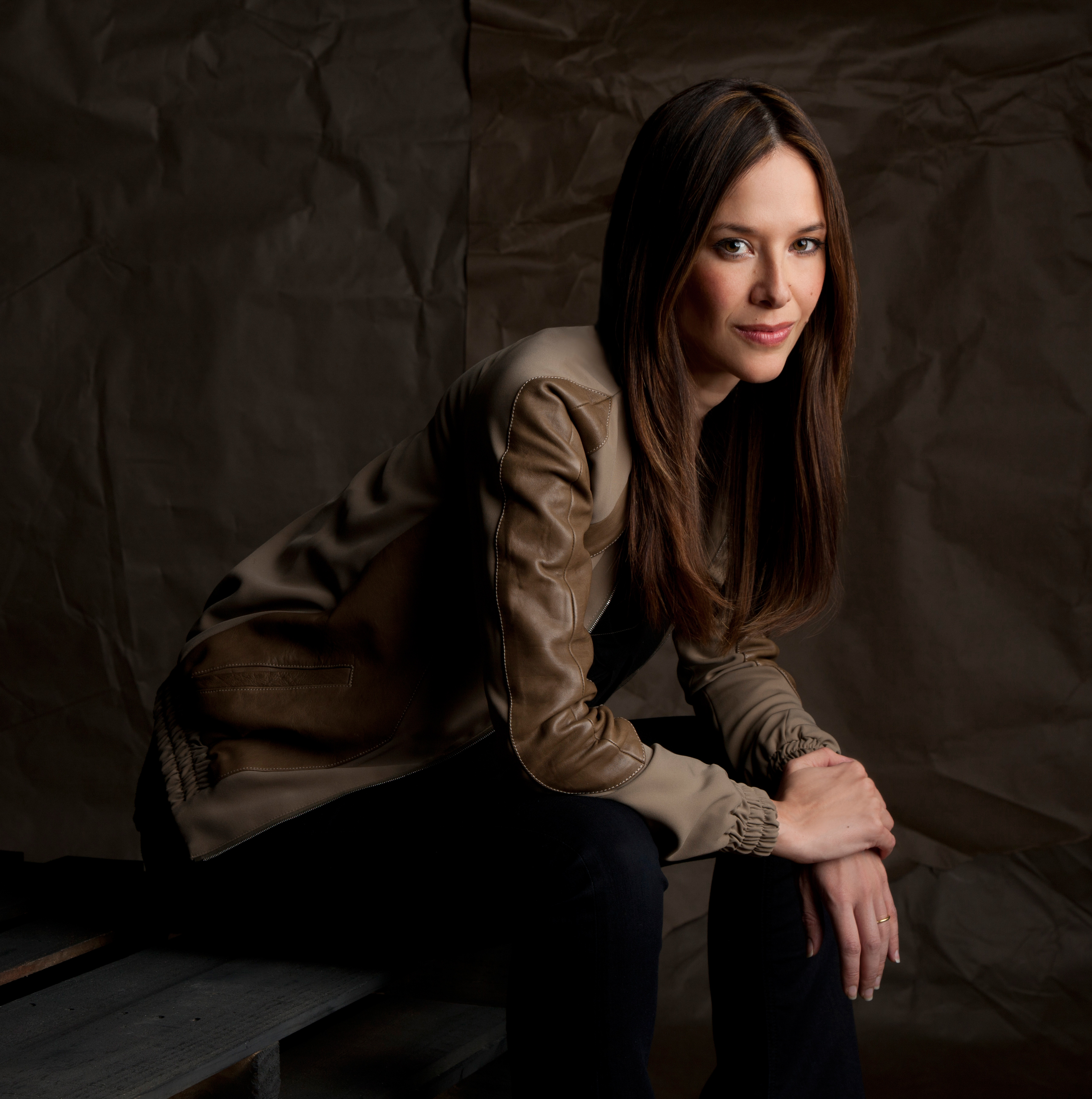
Ubisoft Toronto founder Jade Raymond is the executive producer of Blacklist.

Ubisoft Montreal's success inspired the company to continue its Canadian expansion, and a new studio, Ubisoft Toronto, was announced on July 6, 2009. Headed by Jade Raymond, the studio focuses on the creation of triple-A video games and intellectual property. It worked on a new installment of the Splinter Cell series, which was in parallel development with an unnamed project, and the Toronto team was made up of Ubisoft Montreal's core Conviction team. Maxime Béland, who had worked on Conviction, was the game's creative director, and in November 2010 Raymond confirmed that her studio was developing Splinter Cell 6. Ubisoft Toronto was the game's lead developer, with assistance from Ubisoft Montreal. Ubisoft Shanghai developed the game's co-operative multiplayer mode. The Toronto studio focused on the game's Windows, PlayStation 3 and Xbox 360 versions, with the Wii U version developed by Ubisoft Shanghai.

In 2010, the series' fifth installment, Conviction, was released. Although it received generally positive reviews, it was criticized by series fans for lacking some features. Béland considered Conviction a "stepping stone" for him when he prepared for the development of Blacklist. The development team studied Conviction's reviews and feature lists, deciding to discard its "black-and-white" stealth approach, and also deciding to bring back the Spies vs. Mercs mode introduced in Pandora Tomorrow. Béland called the mode's return "the easiest decision of [his] life", since the team considered its absence Conviction's greatest misstep. Ubisoft sent questionnaires through Uplay to thousands of players to collect feedback on Conviction's new features. When players called Conviction's campaign weak and short, the team added a stronger storyline and greater character depth by introducing the Fourth Echelon and Fisher as a leader (a series first). To encourage repeat play the team introduced the aircraft hub and the strategic mission interface, a player menu.

According to Ubisoft Toronto founder Jade Raymond, the series had become too grueling and complicated for modern gamers, and its popularity had suffered relative to Ubisoft flagship franchises such as Assassin's Creed and Far Cry. The Toronto studio hoped to introduce the franchise to a broader audience, while remaining tactical and hardcore for long-term series fans. It introduced a perfectionist mode, significantly increasing the game's difficulty by removing some of Fisher's abilities. The team also introduced accessible, action-oriented gameplay segments which would suit new players, crafting open-ended levels which could be reached with different approaches to broaden the variety of play. The developers re-worked the controls to increase gameplay fluidity, allowing players to automatically leap over objects and traverse a simplified environment.

During Blacklist's development, its team faced a variety of challenges. The first was to create stealth which was satisfying and fun for players. According to the team, players gain satisfaction from stealth with freedom and choices which allow them to develop a plan. Players must experiment, with each decision having consequences. Game director Patrick Redding compared it to the development of an ecosystem; the team designed a dynamic artificial intelligence which would react differently to players' actions, making levels feel alive and adding randomness. Encouraging the "panther" style of play (aggressive stealth), the team incorporated elements from the original Tom Clancy's Splinter Cell (where one mistake would abort a mission) and Conviction (where stealth seamlessly becomes combat). This approach, the team thought, could help players to feel like elite, silent predators.

Series veteran Michael Ironside did not reprise his role as the voice of Sam Fisher. His part was played by Eric Johnson, who also performed the motion capture. In a Blacklist developer diary, Ironside said that he was passing the torch to another actor. According to Ubisoft executives the change was made to take advantage of new performance-capture technology to enrich the game experience, and Ironside assisted Johnson with the role. Elias Toufexis, voice and performance-capture actor for Andriy Kobin in Conviction, said that he would return for the new game.

Unlike Conviction, the game would have no interactive torture sequences. Instead, players could choose whether to kill or incapacitate a target after interrogation. The system was not complex, and it was hoped that players would choose based on instinct. According to Béland, every player choice is gray and there are no right or wrong choices. However, the game demo has an interactive torture scene in which players can decide how deeply a knife penetrates a person's shoulder. After a mixed-to-negative response, Ubisoft removed the scene from its final product.

=== Marketing ===
Splinter Cell: Blacklist was introduced at E3 2012's Microsoft press conference on June 4, 2012, for Microsoft Windows, PlayStation 3, and Xbox 360. In February 2013, a Wii U version was rumored to be in development, and Ubisoft confirmed the report two months later. Originally scheduled for release in early 2013, the game was pushed back to August on January 16, 2013. On August 3, 2013, Ubisoft confirmed that the game had been declared gold, indicating that it was being prepared for duplication and release. Splinter Cell: Blacklist was released in North America on August 20 and in Europe three days later for Microsoft Windows, PlayStation 3, Wii U, and Xbox 360.

The Paladin Collector's Edition, a limited edition of the game, has a remote-controlled plane, the graphic novel Splinter Cell Echoes, a Billionaire's Yacht co-op map, an Upper Echelon pack with a Dead Coast map, gold sonar goggles, and a limited-edition poster. Splinter Cell: Blacklist - Spider Bot, a 2D puzzle game tie-in, was released for Android and iOS platforms on June 10, 2013 and is available on Google Play and the App Store respectively. Homeland, downloadable content for the game, was released on September 26, 2013. It added a crossbow, several new costumes, and two new missions which can be completed alone or with another player.

== Reception ==
=== Pre-release ===
Although Joystiq's Mike Schramm praised Blacklist's early screenshots and videos for removing Conviction's monochromatic visuals, its new voice actor was not received well by most of fans. Ubisoft responded with a statement that Michael Ironside was not returning as Fisher because an actor "physically capable" of a motion-capture performance was needed, and Eric Johnson was hired for the role.

=== Critical reception ===
Reception

Aggregate score
Aggregator	Score
Metacritic	(PS3) 84/100 (X360) 82/100 (PC) 82/100 (WIIU) 75/100

Review scores
Publication	Score
Eurogamer	8/10
Game Informer	9/10
GameTrailers	8.7/10
IGN	9.2/10
Joystiq	5/5
VideoGamer.com	8/10

Tom Clancy's Splinter Cell: Blacklist received "generally favorable" reviews from critics, according to review aggregator website Metacritic.

The game's design was praised by most reviewers. Ryan McCaffrey of IGN praised the gameplay's variety and player options, which he thought made Blacklist the best installment in the series since Chaos Theory. According to McCaffrey, the game was a satisfying stealth experience and an excellent, capable shooter (increasing its replay value). He noted that several segments forced players to use the Mark and Execute feature, frustrating players who favored stealth over action. Ben Reeves of Game Informer praised the return and refinement of Mark and Execute, which he found satisfying, and praised the game's intense, varied mission design. Tom Bramwell of Eurogamer disliked the game's direction, particularly its action elements (which he compared to 2012's Hitman: Absolution).

Blacklist's campaign was also generally praised. According to IGN's Ryan McCaffrey, the game's story is superior to those of its predecessors: well-balanced and believable. He criticized Sam Fisher's new voice actor, who he thought failed to replicate Ironside's charm. Ben Reeves praised the story's plot twists and sympathetic characters. On the Joystiq blog, Xav De Matos liked the game's narrative urgency and engaging plot twists but criticized its rushed ending. Simon Miller of VideoGamer.com called the game forgettable and boring, with Fisher's new voice actor failing to bring personality to the character. Eurogamer's Bramwell also criticized the game's lack of character development.

Its multiplayer features were praised; according to McCaffrey, the co-operative multiplayer mode had enough content for a separate game. Although he appreciated Spies vs. Mercs' faster pace, he found the mode less innovative than its predecessor. Reeves partially agreed, describing the revived Spies vs. Mercs mode as refreshing, intense, and bloody. De Matos wrote that it was one of the best multiplayer modes he had ever experienced, and the Blacklist version had evolved and modernized while remaining creative. Daniel Bloodworth of GameTrailers praised the game's satisfying co-op design, which tasks players to plan and coordinate strategy.

Blacklist's graphics and lack of difficulty were criticized. McCaffrey found the visuals unimpressive and most character models to be ugly; he also noted technical problems, such as screen-tearing and frame rate issues. Bloodworth criticized the game's invisible wall and unresponsive controls in certain segments, although he thought those minor issues did not drag down its overall experience. McCaffrey noted that even when the game is played in perfectionist mode, it is less challenging than its predecessors. He thought Blacklist gave players too many rewards, making its universal-economy system a useless feature. Bloodworth was puzzled by the game's unlock system, which he said hindered its credibility.

=== Sales ===
Ubisoft hoped that Splinter Cell: Blacklist would sell at least five million units. In the United Kingdom, the game debuted at number two on the UK retail chart in its first week of release, behind Saints Row IV. In the United States, It was August's fourth best-selling game. On October 16, 2013, Ubisoft announced that Blacklist had failed to meet sales expectations, and on November 13, it was announced that the game had sold two million units.
