= Splinter Cell: Firewall =

Audio drama adaptation of Splinter Cell

Splinter Cell: Firewall is a scripted fiction podcast based in the same world as the Tom Clancy's Splinter Cell video games.

== Background ==
Written by Sebastian Baczkiewicz and Paul Cornell, the eight episode BBC Radio 4 spy thriller audio drama debuted on December 2, 2022, releasing 30-minute episodes weekly. Adapted from James Swallow's spinoff novel and recorded in binaural audio, the series follows NSA's fourth echelon agent Sam Fisher as he recruits and trains new operatives while confronting a thought-to-be-dead enemy

== Cast and characters ==
- Andonis Anthony as Sam Fisher
- Daisy Head as Sarah Fisher
- Nikesh Patel
- Rosalie Craig
- Sacha Dhawan
- Will Poulter

== Reception ==
Jeremy Peel wrote in PC Gamer that the show is a faithful adaptation, however, he expressed disappointment that the show was all that was released after so long since a Splinter Cell game was created. David Smith expressed similar frustrations in Kotaku saying that "Ubisoft turned Splinter Cell into a damn radio play before it made a new game" but admitted that similar franchises have had some success in the medium such as Wolverine: The Long Night. The show won best Audio Drama at the 2023 Scribe Awards.
