= Tom Clancy's Splinter Cell (video game) =

2002 video game

- Developer: Ubi Soft Montreal (Note: Ubi Soft Shanghai developed the PlayStation 2 and GameCube ports, and Gameloft developed the adaptation for Game Boy Advance, mobile, and N-Gage. i5works developed the Mac OS X port.)
- Publishers: Ubi Soft; Aspyr Media (Mac)
- Producers: Mathieu Ferland; Reid Schneider
- Designers: Nathan Wolff; Clint Hocking
- Programmer: Antoine Dodens
- Artist: Hugo Dallaire
- Writers: J.T. Petty; Clint Hocking
- Composer: Michael Richard Plowman
- Series: Tom Clancy's Splinter Cell
- Engine: Unreal Engine 2
- Platforms: Xbox; Windows; PlayStation 2; GameCube; Game Boy Advance; Mobile; N-Gage; Mac OS X; PlayStation 3
- Release: November 18, 2002: Xbox; NA: November 18, 2002; EU: November 29, 2002 Windows; NA: February 18, 2003; EU: February 28, 2003 Mobile; WW: March 3, 2003 PlayStation 2; EU: March 28, 2003; NA: April 8, 2003 GameCube; NA: April 8, 2003; EU: June 6, 2003 Game Boy Advance; NA: April 24, 2003; EU: June 6, 2003 N-Gage; EU: December 5, 2003; NA: December 10, 2003 Mac OS X; NA: September 29, 2004 PlayStation 3; EU/AU: September 16, 2011; NA: September 27, 2011
- Genres: Action-adventure, stealth
- Mode: Single-player

Tom Clancy's Splinter Cell is a 2002 action-adventure stealth game developed by Ubi Soft Montreal and published by Ubi Soft. It is the first game in the Splinter Cell series. Endorsed by author Tom Clancy, it follows the activities of NSA black ops agent Sam Fisher (voiced by Michael Ironside). The game was inspired by both the Metal Gear series and games created by Looking Glass Studios, and was built using Unreal Engine 2.

Originally released as an Xbox exclusive in 2002, the game was later ported to Windows, PlayStation 2, GameCube and Mac OS X in 2003. A side-scrolling adaptation developed by Gameloft was also released in 2003 for Game Boy Advance, mobile phones and N-Gage (the latter with the subtitle Team Stealth Action). A remastered high definition version was released on PlayStation 3 in September 2011, and an Xbox version was made available for Xbox One via backward compatibility in June 2019.

Splinter Cell received critical acclaim on release and is considered one of the best video games ever made. The success of the game led to multiple sequels, starting with Pandora Tomorrow in 2004, and a series of novels written under the pseudonym David Michaels. A remake of the game is currently in development by Ubisoft Toronto.

== Gameplay ==
Sam Fisher is rappelling to access the computer during his mission in Georgia.

The primary focus and hallmark of Splinter Cell's gameplay is stealth, with strong emphasis on light and darkness. The player is encouraged to move through the shadows for concealment whenever possible. The game displays a "light meter" that reflects how visible the player character is to enemies, and night vision and thermal vision goggles to help the player navigate in darkness or smoke/fog, respectively. The light meter functions even when it is difficult to gauge how much light is in the environment (for example, if night vision or infrared vision goggles are being used), and it is possible to destroy lights, thus reducing the chances of exposure significantly. Certain cameras can also be shot out and destroyed, although armored security cameras are bulletproof.

Splinter Cell strongly encourages the use of stealth over brute force. Although Sam Fisher is sometimes armed, he carries limited ammunition and is not frequently provided with access to additional bullets. The player begins most missions with a limited supply of less-than-lethal weapons in addition to Fisher's firearms, a suppressed FN Five-Seven pistol that is provided for some mission, as well as a similarly silenced FN F2000 assault rifle which is only available for a number of missions, which includes a telescopic sight and a launcher for some of the less-lethal devices such as ring airfoil projectiles, "sticky shockers" and CS gas grenades. The weapon can even fire a camera that sticks onto surfaces, allowing Fisher to covertly perform surveillance from a safe area.

Flexibility of movement is a focus point of Splinter Cell. Fisher can sneak up on enemies from behind to grab them; allowing interrogation, quiet incapacitation, or use as a human shield. Acrobatic and physically adept, Fisher has a variety of maneuvers including the ability to mantle onto and climb along ledges, hang from pipes and perform a "split jump" in narrow spaces to mantle up a steep wall.

== Plot ==
In August 2004, former U.S. Navy SEAL officer Sam Fisher joins the National Security Agency, as part of its newly formed division "Third Echelon", headed by his old friend Irving Lambert. Two months later, aided by technical expert Anna "Grim" Grimsdóttír and field runner Vernon Wilkes Jr., he is sent to Georgia to investigate the disappearance of two CIA officers. One had been installed into the new government of Georgian president Kombayn Nikoladze, who seized power in a bloodless coup d'état following the assassination of his predecessor; the other was sent in to find the first after her disappearance. Fisher discovers both were murdered on Nikoladze's orders by former Spetsnaz member Vyacheslav Grinko, after discovering that Georgia is secretly waging an ethnic cleansing campaign across Azerbaijan with Georgian commandos. After this is exposed to the international community, NATO launches action in Azerbaijan, prompting Nikoladze to go underground.

Third Echelon soon discovers a data exchange is taking place between a Caspian oil rig and the Georgian presidential palace. Fisher intercepts this, discovering information about an item called "The Ark", as well as evidence that there is a mole in the CIA. Shortly after this, North America is hit by a massive cyberwarfare attack directed at military targets, to which Nikoladze claims responsibility before declaring war on the United States and its allies. Investigating the leak, Fisher infiltrates the CIA headquarters and discovers a staff member backed-up data to an unsecured laptop. He captures the employee, who explains that the laptop was later exploited by a Virginian-based network owned by Kalinatek, Inc, a tech company controlled by the Georgians. After Grim's efforts to access their servers spooks them, Fisher is sent in to recover an encryption key from a technician in the building, before Georgian-hired mafiosos attempt to liquidate all the incriminating evidence. While extracting Fisher, Wilkes is mortally wounded and dies soon afterwards.

With the encryption key, the NSA discover that Nikoladze has been using a network of unconventional relays to communicate with Georgian military cells. Tracing the full relay network back to the Chinese embassy in Yangon, Myanmar, Fisher is sent in discreetly to investigate. He finds that Nikoladze is working alongside Chinese general Kong Feirong, supplying him with nuclear waste in exchange for arms and munitions. Fearful this could lead China and the United States into war, Fisher moves to rescue captured U.S. soldiers at an abattoir before they can be executed live in a web broadcast, in the process encountering high-ranking Chinese diplomats, who reveal Feirong acts against the best interests of China. Grinko, who is at the abattoir, attempts to kill Fisher, but meets his demise in Fisher's attempt to protect the hostages. Returning to the Chinese embassy, Fisher moves in to capture Feirong for information on Nikoladze's location and to expose his rogue activities to the Chinese government. After being prevented from committing suicide in a drunken stupor, Feirong is threatened at gunpoint to access his computer, with its data revealing that Nikoladze had fled back to Georgia in order to activate "The Ark". Feirong subsequently dies from an alcohol overdose.

Infiltrating the Georgian presidential palace where Nikoladze is, alongside the newly installed Georgian president Varlam Cristavi, Fisher attempts to recover the key to the Ark, which he learns is in fact a nuclear suitcase bomb that has been placed somewhere in the United States. Fisher corners Nikoladze, who bargains to give the Ark key in exchange for safe passage out of Georgia. After Cristavi's forces arrive and escort Nikoladze to safety, Lambert rescues Fisher from execution by causing a power blackout, diverting attention from Fisher. Discovering that Nikoladze is offering the Ark's location for protection, Fisher assassinates him on Lambert's orders. The National Guard eventually locates the bomb in an apartment complex in Maryland, and secretly recovers it after evacuating the building under the pretense of dealing with a gas leak. Despite a war being averted, Nikoladze's death sparks international backlash due to the suspicious circumstances surrounding it. While watching the U.S. president giving a speech on the end of the crisis, Fisher receives a secure phone call from Lambert for another assignment.

== Development ==
Ubisoft began development of Tom Clancy's Splinter Cell in 2001, after acquiring the Tom Clancy license in 2000. Meanwhile, the game's story was being written as early as 1999, the game originally started development as a sci-fi, James Bond type game called The Drift, which Ubisoft intended to be "a Metal Gear Solid 2 killer". The game's producer Mathieu Ferland said "Metal Gear Solid was a huge inspiration for Splinter Cell." The game's designer and writer Clint Hocking also said Splinter Cell "owes its existence to" the Metal Gear series, while noting he was also influenced by System Shock, Thief and Deus Ex. The screenplay was written with input from Michael Ironside, who was paid CA$250,000 (equivalent to $410,500 in 2025) for his voiceover work and suggested edits to the story.

Because the development team was aiming for a Teen ESRB rating, the team tried to minimize the level of violence. The soundtrack for the game was composed by English composer Michael Richard Plowman.

=== Version differences ===
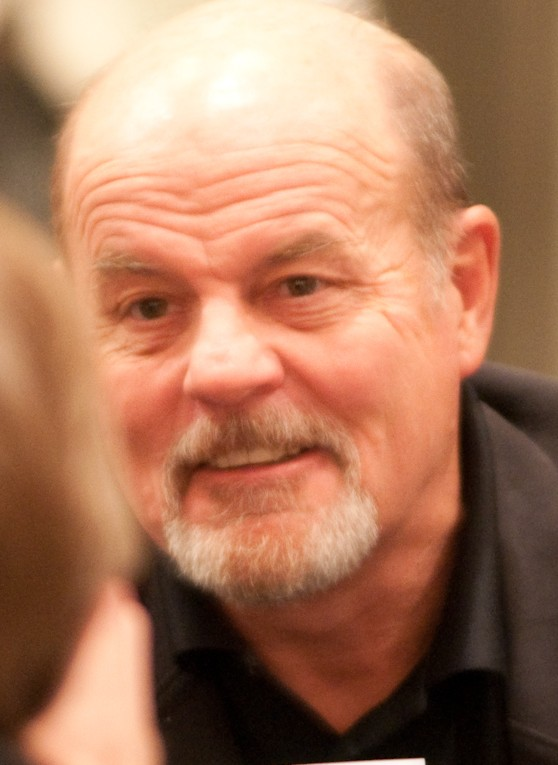
Michael Ironside in 2009.

The PC version of Tom Clancy's Splinter Cell is fairly closely based on the original Xbox version. Both were made by Ubisoft Montreal. The GameCube and PlayStation 2 versions, released later, were developed by Ubisoft Shanghai and are similar to each other, but have many small changes over the originals with the result that they are generally easier. Some doors are moved around, guards are less likely to notice gunshots, etc.

Each version of the game has some exclusive features. The Xbox and Windows versions have three new downloadable missions which involve a Russian nuclear sub. The PlayStation 2 version includes an exclusive level between Kalinatek and the Chinese Embassy which takes place in a nuclear power plant in the Kola Peninsula, new cinematics, a new intro cinematic with original music by the Prague Orchestra and many behind-the-scenes interviews and documentaries both about the new intro and the game itself. The GameCube version includes the same cinematics, uses the Game Boy Advance link cable to give players a real-time overhead map, a new sticky-bomb weapon and progressive scan (480p) support. Additionally, both the GameCube and PlayStation 2 versions include new binoculars items. The Windows versions also includes support for the EAX 3.0 ADVANCED HD 3D positional audio technology by Creative Labs, which available in the EMU10K2 processor-based Soundcard such as the Sound Blaster Audigy and Audigy 2 series.

A PlayStation 3 version of the game was released in September 2011 as part of the Splinter Cell Trilogy in Sony's Classics HD series. It is a port of the PC version, but does not include the downloadable bonus missions that the Xbox and PC versions had. This version features trophy support.

== Reception ==
Reception

Aggregate scores
Aggregator	Score
GameRankings	92.49% (Xbox); 90.50% (Mobile); 90.16% (PC); 88.07% (PS2); 86.82% (GC); 77.28% (GBA); 72.43% (N-Gage)
Metacritic	93/100 (Xbox); 91/100 (PC); 89/100 (PS2); 89/100 (GC); 77/100 (GBA); 74/100 (N-Gage)

Review scores
Publication	Score
Edge	7/10
Electronic Gaming Monthly	9.5/10, 8/10, 8.5/10 (Xbox); 9/10 (GC); 8.83/10 (PS2); 6/10 (GBA)
Eurogamer	9/10; 8/10 (GC); 7/10 (GBA & N-Gage)
Game Informer	8.75/10 (Xbox); 8.5/10; 8/10 (N-Gage)
GamePro	5/5; 4/5 (GC, GBA & N-Gage)
GameRevolution	A−
GameSpot	9.1/10 (Mobile); 8.7/10 (PC); 8.6/10 (Xbox); 8.4/10; 7/10 (GBA & N-Gage)
GameSpy	5/5 (Xbox); 4.5/5; 4/5 (GBA)
GameZone	9.8/10 (PS2); 9.7/10 (Xbox); 9.5/10; 8.6/10 (N-Gage); 8.5/10 (GBA)
IGN	9.6/10 (Xbox); 9.4/10 (PC); 9.1/10; 9/10 (Mobile); 8/10 (GBA); 7/10 (N-Gage)
Nintendo Power	4.1/5 (GC); 3.8/5 (GBA)
Official U.S. PlayStation Magazine	4.5/5
Official Xbox Magazine (US)	9.6/10
PC Gamer (US)	91%
The Cincinnati Enquirer	4/4
Entertainment Weekly	A

Tom Clancy's Splinter Cell received positive reviews upon the game's release. GameSpot's Greg Kasavin said that Splinter Cell has "hands down the best lighting effects seen in any game to date." GameSpot later named Splinter Cell the second-best Xbox game of November 2002, behind MechAssault. IGN likewise praised the game for its graphics and lighting, while also praising how it evolved Metal Gear Solid's third-person stealth-action gameplay. Both praised the game's audio, noting that Michael Ironside as Sam Fisher's voice suited the role perfectly. Scott Alan Marriott of AllGame gave the Xbox version four-and-a-half stars out of five and called it "one of the few games to elicit a feeling of suspense without resorting to shock techniques found in survival horror titles like Resident Evil."

Criticism of the game was also present. Greg Kasavin said that Splinter Cell is "sometimes reduced to frustrating bouts of trial and error." In addition, Kasavin criticized the game's cutscenes, saying that they are not up to par with the rest of the game's graphics.

Non video-game publications also gave the game favorable reviews. Entertainment Weekly gave the Xbox version an A and called it "wickedly ingenious". The Village Voice gave the PlayStation 2 version eight out of ten and said, "If this game were any more realistic, you'd have to hold in your farts." The Cincinnati Enquirer gave the Game Boy Advance version all four stars and said that "While it lacks 3-D graphics and an impressive use of lighting and shadows found in its predecessors, the stealthy action game still captures the thrill of modern espionage."

=== Sales ===
Tom Clancy's Splinter Cell was a commercial success. Pre-orders reached 1.1 million units and the game sold 480,000 copies worldwide by the end of 2002, after three weeks on sale. France accounted for 60,000 units in the initial three weeks. By early January 2003, sales in North America had surpassed 1 million units, while Europe accounted for 600,000 units. By March 31, 2003, its sales had risen to 3.6 million copies. Splinter Cell sold 4.5 million copies by June and 5 million by the end of September, and its sales reached 6 million units by the end of March 2004. By July 2006, the Xbox version of Splinter Cell had sold 2.4 million copies and earned $62 million in the United States alone. Next Generation ranked it as the 10th highest-selling game launched for the PlayStation 2, Xbox or GameCube between January 2000 and July 2006 in that country. It remained the best-selling Splinter Cell game in the United States by July 2006.

The game's PlayStation 2 and Xbox versions each received a "Platinum" sales award from the Entertainment and Leisure Software Publishers Association (ELSPA), given to titles that sell at least 300,000 copies in the United Kingdom. Splinter Cell's computer version received a "Silver" sales award from ELSPA, indicating sales of at least 100,000 copies in the United Kingdom.

=== Awards ===
- E3 2002 Game Critics Awards: "Best Action/Adventure Game"
- 3rd Annual Game Developers Choice Awards: "Excellence in Writing"
- 6th Annual Interactive Achievement Awards: "Console Game of the Year", "Outstanding Achievement in Gameplay Engineering"
- IGN Best of 2002: "Xbox Game of the Year", "Xbox Best Graphics"
- 2003 Spike Video Game Awards: "Best Handheld Game"

Splinter Cell was a runner-up for Computer Games Magazine's list of the 10 best games of 2003. It won GameSpot's 2002 "Best Graphics (Technical)" and "Best Action Adventure Game" awards among Xbox games, and was nominated in the "Best Sound", "Best Graphics (Artistic)" and overall "Game of the Year on Xbox" categories.

=== Nominations ===
- 3rd Annual Game Developers Choice Awards: "Game of the Year", "Original Game Character of the Year", "Excellence in Game Design", "Excellence in Level Design", "Excellence in Programming"
- 6th Annual Interactive Achievement Awards: "Console Action/Adventure Game of the Year", "Outstanding Innovation in Console Gaming", "Outstanding Achievement in Sound Design", "Outstanding Achievement in Visual Engineering"
- 7th Annual Interactive Achievement Awards: "Outstanding Achievement in Character Performance - Male" (Michael Ironside as Sam Fisher)
- IGN Best of 2002: "Overall Game of the Year"

== Remake ==
On December 15, 2021, Ubisoft announced that a remake of the game is under development at Ubisoft Toronto using Snowdrop, the game engine behind Tom Clancy's The Division and Avatar: Frontiers of Pandora.
