= Tom Clancy's Splinter Cell: Conviction =

2010 video game

- Developer: Ubisoft Montreal
- Publishers: Ubisoft; Microsoft Game Studios (Note: Microsoft has published and distributed the physical and digital versions in certain countries of the PAL region and Japan.)
- Director: Maxime Béland
- Producer: Alexandre Parizeau
- Designer: Steven Masters
- Artists: Sidonie Weber; The Chinh Ngo; Vincent Jean
- Writers: Richard Dansky; Mike Lee
- Composers: Kaveh Cohen; Michael Nielsen; Amon Tobin
- Series: Tom Clancy's Splinter Cell
- Engine: Unreal Engine 2
- Platforms: Xbox 360; Windows; iOS; Cloud (OnLive); Android; Mac OS X; Windows Phone; Bada; Java ME
- Release: April 13, 2010: Xbox 360; NA: April 13, 2010; AU: April 15, 2010; EU: April 16, 2010 Windows; NA: April 27, 2010; AU: April 29, 2010; EU: April 30, 2010 iOS; WW: May 27, 2010; WW: July 29, 2010 (HD) OnLive; WW: October 25, 2010 Android; WW: December 23, 2010 Mac OS X; WW: February 17, 2011 (Online); WW: March 28, 2011 (Steam) Windows Phone; WW: February 22, 2012
- Genres: Action-adventure, stealth
- Modes: Single-player, multiplayer

Tom Clancy's Splinter Cell: Conviction is a 2010 action-adventure stealth game developed by Ubisoft Montreal and co-published by Microsoft Game Studios and Ubisoft. The game is a sequel to Splinter Cell: Double Agent and part of the Splinter Cell series. Key members of the Tom Clancy's Rainbow Six: Vegas team, such as creative director Maxime Béland worked on the game. It released for Windows and Xbox 360 in April 2010. Gameloft released a handheld version for Apple's iOS in May/July 2010. There are also versions available for Android, Windows Phone, and Bada, as well as a side-scrolling 2D version for mobile phones.

Additionally, the game can be purchased from the Xbox digital store and played on Xbox One and Xbox Series consoles through the Xbox backwards compatibility program.

Splinter Cell: Conviction received positive reviews from critics. They praised its gameplay, art direction, and narrative, although there was criticism on the short length of the campaign, and departure from the stealth genre compared to previous titles. The game had sold 1.9 million units by July 2010. A sequel, titled Blacklist, released in 2013.

== Gameplay ==
The Mark and Execute gameplay in use. Here, Sam Fisher guns down burglars in the tutorial flashback.

Splinter Cell: Conviction introduces a number of new gameplay features to the Splinter Cell series, one of which is the "Mark & Execute" feature, which allows the player to mark specific targets, such as enemies or objects, and shoot them in rapid succession without manually targeting each one. The player can choose to prioritize these targets, so that, for example, he can distract one guard by shooting out a light in his vicinity and then take out another guard. Another new feature is the "Last Known Position", which occurs when the player breaks the line of sight of an alerted guard. This creates a visual silhouette where the guard thinks Sam is, allowing the player to flank his enemies.

Other new features include the ability to interrogate characters in real-time, and use objects in the surrounding environment against them. Mission objectives and key plot points are projected onto walls within the in-game world, in order to keep the player immersed in the gameplay. Several other features, such as blending into crowds, improvising gadgets, and interaction with the environment, were announced, and according to creative director Maxime Béland would have given the game "a lot of Bourne Identity influence," but were scrapped after the development team decided that going in this direction would be taking too much of a risk.

Some of the features that were present in the last four games in the series do not appear in this game. Sam's hybrid night/heat vision goggles and his multipurpose SC-20K assault rifle, which were the mainstay of the last four games, no longer appear. They have instead been replaced by Sonar Goggles (which can see enemies through walls and facilitate Mark and Exeute) and the SC3000, a standalone assault rifle with no unique properties. His light sensor is also absent, although the change in the screen saturation into grayscale now shows whether Sam is hidden from view. Sam can no longer move or hide dead bodies, nor can he knock enemies unconscious, as all equipment that helped doing the latter are absent. Lock picking and hacking minigames are also not included in the game. Sam has been equipped with pistols with unlimited ammo and suppressors, which helps him terminate enemies stealthily. While other options such as battle rifles, shotguns, and submachine guns, are available to use, pistols are classified as primary weapons.

One of Ubisoft's stated goals for Conviction was to make the game more accessible. According to Béland, Chaos Theory is "very hardcore", which turned off many players and disconnected people from the fantasy of being Sam Fisher. Béland contrasted the earlier games in the series with works containing James Bond or Jason Bourne, who "run fast, they don't make noise, they kill one, two, three or four guys super quickly", and he stated that Conviction delivers a similarly dynamic experience with more of an emphasis on action than previous Splinter Cell games.

=== Multiplayer ===
The multiplayer mode in Splinter Cell: Conviction involves both split screen, System Link (Xbox 360), and online co-op, plus a "Deniable Ops" mode, involving four modes that pit players against AI enemies in game modes such as "Hunter" (where the player must kill a set number of enemies), "Infiltration" (where the player must kill a set number of enemies without being seen), "Last Stand" (where the player must protect a bomb as enemies try to disarm it), and "Face-Off" (a competitive version of "Hunter"). "Face-Off" is the game's only competitive multiplayer mode, as it features the ability to kill the opposing player. "Hunter", "Infiltration", and "Last Stand" can be played in single-player modes and do not always have to be played with a human partner. The game does not contain the "Spies Vs Mercenaries" mode featured in the previous games of the series.

According to co-op game director Patrick Redding, the stealth in Conviction is designed around new core elements like "Mark & Execute" and "Last Known Position".

== Plot ==
The game's story is divided into two portions. The main portion is the game's single-player campaign, which puts the player in control of Sam Fisher three years after the events of Splinter Cell: Double Agent. The "Prologue" portion of the game, meanwhile, is accessed through the multiplayer co-op mode, which puts two players in control of agents Archer and Kestrel 10 days before the campaign starts.

=== Prologue ===
Split screen mode of the co-op campaign. Archer (left) and Kestrel take armed guards by surprise.

Third Echelon agent "Archer" and his Russian partner, Voron agent "Kestrel" are deployed to Nevsky Prospekt in Saint Petersburg, Russia to halt rogue elements of the Russian military from selling advanced warheads on the black market. Intelligence from criminal Andriy Kobin points to drug and human trafficker Valentin Lesovsky as the broker for the sale, and Archer and Kestrel are tasked with terminating Lesovsky and his associate, Boris Sychev, as well as gaining Lesovsky's contact list.

Having completed their mission, Archer and Kestrel are then deployed to the Russian embassy in Baku, Azerbaijan to gather intelligence on an arms deal conducted by former Russian GRU Colonel Leonid Bykhov. They observe the deal and witness Bhykov betray his associate, Tagizade, ordering his men to kill him. Archer and Kestrel prevent the destruction of the weapons crates, learning that the weapons Bhykov was going to sell were Block II JDAM missile guidance kits. They interrogate Bhykov, learning that he is working with Major General Kerzakov, who is in the Yastreb Complex, an underground fortress situated underneath Moscow's Red Square.

They infiltrate the complex and learn the location of the EMP warheads. They render the JDAM kits inoperable by using their portable EMP devices, and download data from multiple servers to trace the EMP devices to the Mozdok Proving Grounds. Sneaking aboard a supply truck, they infiltrate the Proving Grounds and secure the EMP devices with the help of Kobin. During their extraction, Third Echelon director Tom Reed contacts Archer and orders him to kill Kestrel; concurrently, Kestrel reads Archer's OPSAT device, forcing him to act in self-defense. Whilst either player can die, the canon ending has Kestrel fatally shooting Archer; overcome with grief and unaware of Kobin's presence, Kestrel is shot in the head.

=== Main campaign ===
Private military company Black Arrow interrogates Sam Fisher’s former Navy SEAL squadmate Victor Coste, who begins to recount the events of the last few days.

After quitting Third Echelon, Fisher heads to Valletta, Malta, to investigate rumors that the hit-and-run death of his daughter, Sarah, might not have been an accident. Suddenly, Anna "Grim" Grímsdóttir, Sam's former colleague, contacts him and warns him of an imminent attack by a group of hitmen. Sam neutralizes them and goes after their contractor, Kobin, who was the true culprit behind Sarah's death. He infiltrates Kobin's mansion, kills his guards, and begins to interrogate him, but a Third Echelon Splinter Cell team subdues him before he can extract anything useful.

Grim and Black Arrow bring Sam to Price Airfield in Virginia, where they are to interrogate him. However, Grim releases Sam, revealing that she is working undercover for U.S. President Patricia Caldwell, investigating suspicious circumstances concerning Director Reed, Black Arrow, and the stolen Russian EMP technology. She reveals that Sarah is still alive and helps Sam escape the airfield.

Sam then contacts and arranges to meet with Coste at the Washington Monument to receive some equipment. He also learns that Lucius Galliard, CEO of Black Arrow, has tasked them to provide security for White Box Technologies, his recently purchased R&D company specializing in EMP technology. Sam infiltrates White Box Technologies and witnesses Black Arrow mercenaries purging scientists that are no longer needed. He hacks a high-security White Box computer and retrieves strategic data about an operation involving EMPs for Grim's analysts to study. He escapes the facility after fighting through more Black Arrow mercenaries, triggering an EMP to cover his tracks. Later, President Caldwell directs him to the Lincoln Memorial to eavesdrop on Reed and Galliard. The conversation and the subsequent interrogation of Galliard reveal that a group called "Megiddo" funds and organizes the operation, which is to take place in 24 hours. However, a hitman shoots Galliard dead before running away; Sam gives chase, but a car bomb ultimately kills the assassin.

Sam then heads to Third Echelon headquarters where he receives a set of advanced sonar goggles from Grim's friend Charlie Fryman, and raids Reed's office for information. However, Sam finds Kobin there and interrogates him. Kobin reveals that Reed works for Megiddo, and is planning to activate three massive EMP devices in Washington DC and assassinate Caldwell in the ensuing chaos, allowing Vice President Calvin Samson to take over the presidency. Reed would then get a promotion in return. Kobin also reveals that it was Grim who gave him orders to fake Sarah's death. Grim confirms this by playing an audio recording of deceased former director Irving Lambert where he reveals that he discovered a mole in Third Echelon who was plotting to threaten Sarah's safety and use her as leverage against Sam. Although Lambert successfully staged Sarah's death to foil this plan, he was unable to identify the mole. Grim urges an enraged Sam to destroy the EMP device in the Michigan Avenue Reservoir, as Sarah's apartment is within its blast radius. At this time, the Third Echelon building's self-destruct protocol activates, and Sam escapes before the building explodes.

With the aid of Coste, Sam attacks the Michigan Avenue Reservoir. After fighting through the Black Arrow mercenaries defending the site, Sam marks the EMP generators for Coste to destroy from the air. Sam is then extracted by Coste and reunites with Sarah before the two remaining EMPs are activated, destroying most of the electronic defenses in the city and causing chaos. Shortly afterward, a surface-to-air missile takes down Coste's helicopter, but all three survive. While Coste takes Sarah to safety, Sam journeys through downtown Washington to make his way to the White House, which has been overrun by Black Arrow mercenaries and Third Echelon operatives. After he confronts and incapacitates the corrupt Vice President, Sam regroups with Grim.

As Grim and Sam must enter the Oval Office without alarming Reed, who may kill the President, Grim shoots Sam in the shoulder and pretends to detain him at gunpoint, allowing them to enter the Oval Office safely. Reed prepares to execute Sam and the President, revealing that Caldwell was going to shut down Third Echelon after Lambert's death. Reed then plans to frame Sam for assassinating Caldwell as supposed proof that Third Echelon is still needed. Sam and Grim then spring into action, disarming Reed and killing his escorts. Sam interrogates Reed while United States Army soldiers extract Caldwell. Reed reveals himself to be the mole Lambert was investigating. At this point, Sam or Grim executes Reed depending on the player's choice. Canonically, Grim executes Reed.

As Coste begins to wrap up his story, he states that Sam, in his last conversation, promised to protect him just as he would his brother. At that moment, the interrogators hear an alarm, followed by an explosion and gunfire in the background. They abandon the interview and leave Coste behind.

== Development ==
The existence of a sequel to Double Agent was leaked to the internet on September 21, 2006, through a 2GB rar file containing, among other media, 75 concept art images of as-yet unannounced next-generation games uploaded to Ubisoft's public FTP site. The leaked images showed gloomy images of the Washington Monument under military occupation, as well as roadside views of Washington, D.C.

Conviction was officially announced on May 23, 2007, when Ubisoft released a trailer for the game. It depicted a more rugged-looking Sam with long hair and a fully-grown beard. He had the ability to blend in with the environment, interact with tables and chairs and utilize hand-to-hand combat against enemies, making the game appear less stealth-based than previous games. The lighting and shadow effects also showed a vast improvement over Double Agent. The game was originally due for release on November 16, 2007. However, it missed its initial launch date, and on May 19, 2008, Xbox World reported that Splinter Cell: Conviction was "officially on hold," and had been taken "back to the drawing board." While Ubisoft never confirmed this, they did announce that the game had been pushed back to the 2009-2010 fiscal year.

The game resurfaced at E3 2009, with a completely new visual style and a more casual-looking Sam. The developers confirmed that the "new" Conviction had been in development since early 2008, commenting that "the gameplay has evolved a lot" and "the visual direction is simply much better." The game was given a November 2009 release date at E3, but was later pushed back to the first quarter of 2010. After initially announcing a release date of February 23, Ubisoft delayed the game again until April. On February 4, 2010, Ubisoft officially announced that the game would be released on April 13 for the Xbox 360.

Conviction supports AMD's multi-monitor-technology Eyefinity.

=== Audio ===
On July 16, 2007, it was announced that composers Kaveh Cohen and Michael Nielsen, in association with music house Groove Worx, would be composing the score to Conviction, their first score for a video game. On October 25, 2007, Soundtrack.net posted a news item from the scoring session for the game, featuring photographs of the orchestral recording of the music. On January 28, 2010, a message was posted on Amon Tobin's website, stating that he would contribute to the game.

On March 29, 2010, it was revealed in an interview that Michael Ironside considered not returning to the role as Sam Fisher as a result of not being able to add more to the character. However, he changed his mind when Ubisoft sent him a copy of the script.

== Release ==
=== Retail versions ===
Splinter Cell: Conviction is available on the Xbox 360 and Microsoft Windows platforms, as well as mobile versions for the iOS and Java ME. Ubisoft stated that it had no plans to release it on the PlayStation 3 with Max Béland, the creative director of Splinter Cell further stating; "Well, Splinter Cell was originally built on Xbox and we've had a great relationship with Microsoft. So Conviction is an exclusive for 360, it's not going to go to PS3." The PC version implemented Ubisoft's new DRM, which requires a permanent internet connection.

Conviction was released in four retail versions. In addition to the standard version, a Special Edition, a Collector's Edition, and a Limited Collector's Edition were also released.

The Special Edition, called Shadow Edition, was exclusive to Britain, specifically, Game, Gamestation and Gameplay, and featured alternate box art, a SPAS-12 silenced shotgun, early in-game access to the SC3000 and a special "Shadow Armor" playable skin. Pre-orders also included Tom Clancy's Splinter Cell: Conviction Projector Torch.

The Collector's Edition was exclusive to the United States and Canada, and featured a USB flash drive, an artbook based on the Splinter Cell series, two decal stickers, a comic book detailing the events leading up to Conviction, and two in-game items: an MP5-SD3 sub-machine gun and a Third Echelon spy suit. Due to a number of defective USB drives, Ubisoft lowered the price of the collector's edition by $10.

The Limited Collector's Edition was exclusive to European, Middle Eastern, Asian and Pacific territories. It included a high quality edition box with a Sam Fisher figurine, steel-book DVD case with the game disc, manual and game soundtrack CD (24 tracks), and a card with 5 bonus in-game content codes: for the MP-5 sub-machine gun, SC-3000 assault rifle, SMG-2 machine pistol, "Infiltration" game mode and the Shadow Armor outfit.

Some individual stores also released their own variations. GameStop pre-orders included a SPAS-12 silenced shotgun code. Best Buy pre-orders included a SC-3000 assault rifle code. Amazon.co.uk released its own Limited Edition which contained the standard version of the game, a separate DVD case called "Exclusive Pre-order Pack" and the SPAS-12 code, a 32-page comic book ("Digging in the Ashes") and a DVD detailing the making of the game. Play.com's version of the game contained the standard edition, plus Tom Clancy's Splinter Cell: Conviction carabiner torch.

In March 2010, Microsoft announced a special limited-edition black Xbox 360 Elite console for Tom Clancy's Splinter Cell: Conviction. The unit includes a 250 GB hard drive, two black wireless controllers, a black wired headset, an ethernet cable, a standard definition composite A/V cable, and a physical copy of the game in the standard version.

=== Ports ===
On May 27, 2010, a version of the game was released for the iOS. Developed and published by Gameloft, it featured very similar gameplay, with the biggest difference being a simplification of the story, omitting the entire prologue, and many individual scenes and characters from the main game. It did however feature an exclusive level not found in the original game - a speed boat level set on the Potomac River.

In June 2010, Ubisoft announced a version for the Mac OS X. It was set for release on October 19, 2010, but was delayed until February 17, 2011.

A port was released as part of the Windows Phone "Must Have Games" promotion on February 22, 2012.

=== Downloadable content ===
Splinter Cell: Conviction released weekly unlockable content every Thursday through the in-game "Extras" menu. The content included weapons, gadgets, multiplayer skins and Deniable Ops maps. Conviction also continued with Ubisoft's new Uplay downloadable rewards program. With Uplay, players earn units for completing set in-game tasks that can be used to purchase various content in Splinter Cell, or saved for content in future Ubisoft releases. On May 27, 2010, the only official DLC map pack was released, titled "The Insurgency Pack." It features four new levels for the Deniable Ops mode, and nine new Achievements worth a total of 250 Gamerscore.

=== Ghost Recon: Future Soldier multiplayer beta ===
On April 19, 2012, a closed multiplayer beta was made available to owners of Splinter Cell: Conviction on Xbox 360 for the upcoming installment in the Ghost Recon series, as well as people who preordered the game from GameStop or PlayStation Plus members.

== Soundtrack ==
=== Original soundtrack ===
Splinter Cell: Conviction - Original Soundtrack

Soundtrack album by Michael Nielsen/Kaveh Cohen
- Released: April 13, 2010
- Recorded: Groove Addicts
- Genre: Video game soundtrack
- Producer: Ubisoft Music

On April 13, 2010, Ubisoft Music in conjunction with composers Michael Nielsen and Kaveh Cohen released a 16-track Official Soundtrack to Splinter Cell: Conviction exclusively via iTunes.

With the release of the Limited Collector's Edition of Splinter Cell: Conviction, the "Original Soundtrack" CD by Michael Nielsen and Kaveh Cohen was included, featuring one track composed and produced by Amon Tobin, who had previously composed the soundtrack to Chaos Theory. No track list is incorporated onto the CD or packaging. However, on April 18, 2010, Nielson posted a track list for the CD on his Myspace page.

On April 20, 2010, a news bulletin was posted on Amon Tobin's website following the release of what is understood to be the majority of his contributions to the Splinter Cell: Conviction's score.

== Reception ==
=== Critical reception ===
Reception

Aggregate scores
Aggregator	Score			
Aggregator	General	iOS	PC	Xbox 360
GameRankings		74.14%	82.54%	86.50%
Metacritic		72/100	83/100	85/100

Review scores
Publication	Score			
Publication	General	iOS	PC	Xbox 360
1Up.com				A-
Eurogamer				7/10
Game Informer				9/10
GamePro			5/5	5/5
GameRevolution	A−			
GameSpot			6.5/10	8/10
GamesRadar+				4/5
GameTrailers				8.9/10
IGN		7.4/10	8.5/10	9.3/10
Official Xbox Magazine (UK)				8/10
Official Xbox Magazine (US)				8.5/10
PC Gamer (UK)			87/100	
PC Zone			84/100	
VideoGamer.com				9/10
X-Play				4/5

Splinter Cell: Conviction received "generally favorable" reviews from critics, according to review aggregator website Metacritic.

IGN's Alec Meer awarded it a score of 9.3 out of 10 and gave it an "Editor's Choice Award." Edge magazine's Tim Ingham awarded Conviction 8/10 in a lead review, claiming that the title is "in reach of greatness." He was particularly impressed with Sam Fisher's ability to turn any environment into "torture chambers" at the press of a button. The main points of criticism were its short length and that too much of the title is played in monochrome. GameSpot's Kevin Van Ord awarded the game a score of 8 out of 10, praising its cooperative mode and storytelling, but criticizing its short length and slimmed-down stealth elements, as well as most of the interrogation sections, stating that interrogations were a "missed opportunity" and "more predictable than provocative." GameTrailers gave it an 8.9 out of 10 praising the "top-notch voice acting" and the game as a whole, saying "Conviction is a gripping new chapter in the Splinter Cell saga." Game Informer gave the game a 9 out of 10 and GamePro gave it a 5 out of 5.

Conviction had a less welcome reception with some PC reviewers. GameSpot's Kevin Van Ord scored it 6.5/10, citing bugs, missing features, connection issues and a higher price than a typical PC game. PC Gamer UK gave a score of 87/100, but wrote "we can't recommend you buy this game with the current DRM."

During the 14th Annual Interactive Achievement Awards, the Academy of Interactive Arts & Sciences nominated Splinter Cell: Conviction for "Outstanding Achievement in Animation".

=== Sales ===
In the United States, Splinter Cell: Conviction sold 486,000 units in April 2010, making it the best-selling game of the month.

By July 2010, the game had sold 1.9 million units.
