= Sam Fisher (Splinter Cell) =

Fictional character in the videogame and novel series "Tom Clancy's Splinter Cell"

- Tom Clancy's Splinter Cell character
- Sam Fisher in Splinter Cell: Blacklist (2013)
- First appearance: Tom Clancy's Splinter Cell (2002)
- Created by: J. T. Petty
- Designed by: Martin Caya
- Voiced by: Expand: Michael Ironside (2002–10, 2018–20); Eric Johnson (2013); Jeff Teravainen (2020); Andonis Anthony (Splinter Cell: Firewall); Nigel Barber (Captain Laserhawk: A Blood Dragon Remix); Liev Schreiber (Splinter Cell: Deathwatch)

In-universe information
- Nationality: American

Sam Fisher is a fictional character and the protagonist of the Tom Clancy's Splinter Cell series of video games developed by Ubisoft. He was created by writer J. T. Petty and designed by artist Martin Caya.

Fisher was originally voiced by veteran actor Michael Ironside in the first five installments of the series. In 2013, Eric Johnson provided the voice and motion capture for the character in Tom Clancy's Splinter Cell: Blacklist. Ironside later returned to the role in 2018, participating in a crossover downloadable content update for Tom Clancy's Ghost Recon: Wildlands and again in 2020 for Tom Clancy's Ghost Recon: Breakpoint. Fisher was also added as a playable character in Tom Clancy's Rainbow Six Siege, voiced by Jeff Teravainen, appears as a supporting character in Captain Laserhawk: A Blood Dragon Remix, voiced by Nigel Barber, and serves as the protagonist of Splinter Cell: Deathwatch, voiced by Liev Schreiber.

== Concept and creation ==
Sam Fisher was created for the video game Tom Clancy's Splinter Cell. He initially worked for the National Security Agency in the organization's "Third Echelon" program. His design was created by lead character artist Martin Caya. Initially, Caya professed that he was trying to come up with a design that would "look cool," examining military magazines, comics, and movies to be inspired. During a sketching session, Caya came up with the idea of a "dark silhouette hiding in the shadows, and the only thing visible would be the reflection of some lights bouncing off the lenses of some night vision goggles." This became the "visual foundation" for Sam Fisher. He noted that, while it was unrealistic for a stealth game, it looked "fucking cool." Other ideas came from members of the staff, such as making him older and make his hair greying. When writing the character, J. T. Petty wrote him to have "wry, detached humor," alongside dialogue meant to convey "the confidence of a man comfortably past his prime but none the worse for wear." In Tom Clancy's Splinter Cell: Conviction, Fisher is designed with a more "civilian" appearance. Players control Fisher using a "panther" play style, which involved letting Fisher "swiftly [going] from kill to kill" before vanishing. A big push was to allow Fisher to be more lethal. In Tom Clancy's Splinter Cell: Blacklist, he is the leader of the "Fourth Echelon", and he is designed with his goggles and wet suit. The designers made a point of ensuring players could use their preferred play style.

He was voiced by Michael Ironside in Splinter Cell as well as multiple other games in the Splinter Cell series. Fabien Noel, a member of the sound team, was responsible for directing Ironside's performance. Noel noted that Ironside became more invested in the character as time went on, becoming attached to him.

== Appearances ==
Sam Fisher originally appeared in the video game Tom Clancy's Splinter Cell. In this game, Fisher joins the National Security Agency as part of the division "Third Echelon", sent to investigate two missing Central Intelligence Agency operatives in Georgia. Fisher eventually discovered that they were both murdered under President Kombayn Nikoladze's orders, who Fisher discovered was leading an ethnic cleansing campaign in Azerbaijan, leading to NATO intervention that sent Nikoladze underground. Fisher was eventually sent to recover data, on technology called The Ark. Nikoladze declares war on the United States, and Fisher eventually discovers a network used by Nikoladze which he traced to Myanmar. He finds captured US soldiers and Chinese diplomats, and discovers that Nikoladze is working with rogue Chinese soldiers. Fisher interrogated their leader, discovering Nikoladze went back to Georgia to activate The Ark, which turns out to be a nuclear suitcase bomb placed somewhere in the United States. Fisher is about to be executed after failing to secure The Ark, but is rescued. He eventually assassinates Nikoladze, and the National Guard eventually secures the suitcase bomb.

In the sequel, Splinter Cell: Pandora Tomorrow, Fisher is sent to gather intelligence on the militia group, Darah Dan Doa, helping to retake an embassy held by the group. Their leader, Suhadi Sadono, escapes, and he later discovers that Sadono is executing a plot called "Pandora Tomorrow," where he plans to unleash biological bombs containing smallpox on the United States, having a failsafe to prevent him from being killed or captured. Fisher is sent to discover the locations of the bombs, and spies are sent to deactivate them. He is sent to take Sadono alive, a decision made due to complications caused by his assassination of Nikoladze. After securing him, one smallpox bomb was set to be detonated at an airport, but Fisher is able to have the bomb safely detonated.

Sam Fisher was added as a playable character in the video game Tom Clancy's Rainbow Six Siege.

=== In other media ===
An alternate version of Sam Fisher appears in the 2023 animated series Captain Laserhawk: A Blood Dragon Remix. This version of Fisher is depicted as an amputee who lost his legs in battle. Following the rise of the Eden megacorporation and its takeover of the United States, he becomes a revolutionary fighting against their control, while his daughter Sarah willingly joins Eden, becoming the warden of its Supermaxx prison.

== Reception ==
Sam Fisher has been generally well received since his appearance in Tom Clancy's Splinter Cell, being hailed as one of the biggest characters on Xbox and one of the console's synonyms in 2002, with praise going to the characterization used by Microsoft Game Studios and Ubisoft. In 2008, PC Zone staff felt that Fisher started as an iconic character, but the "genuine lack of imagination" let him down. Although Fisher ultimately did not make the cut, Game Informer staff considered his inclusion in their "30 characters that defined a decade" collection, with writer Bryan Vore stating that while he may seem like "a poor man's Solid Snake," his "quiet and deadly efficiency, gruff yet sarcastic demeanor, and the willingness to disobey orders he doesn't believe in" set him apart. Fellow Game Informer writer Nolan Good felt that Michael Ironside's portrayal of Sam Fisher was as iconic as Fisher himself, stating that Ironside's performance was enhanced by Fisher's "quintessential design." Writer Scott Beattie discussed how Fisher's actions were essentially terrorism, that if he did what he did while working for Al-Qaeda, it would be indistinguishable. While discussing Fisher's mindset, that regular guards are not his enemy, Beattie invoked writer Kurt Vonnegut's view on the "expendability of bit characters in American literature," talking about how players are given ethical dilemmas while controlling Fisher.
