= Eric Johnson (actor) =

Canadian actor (born 1979)

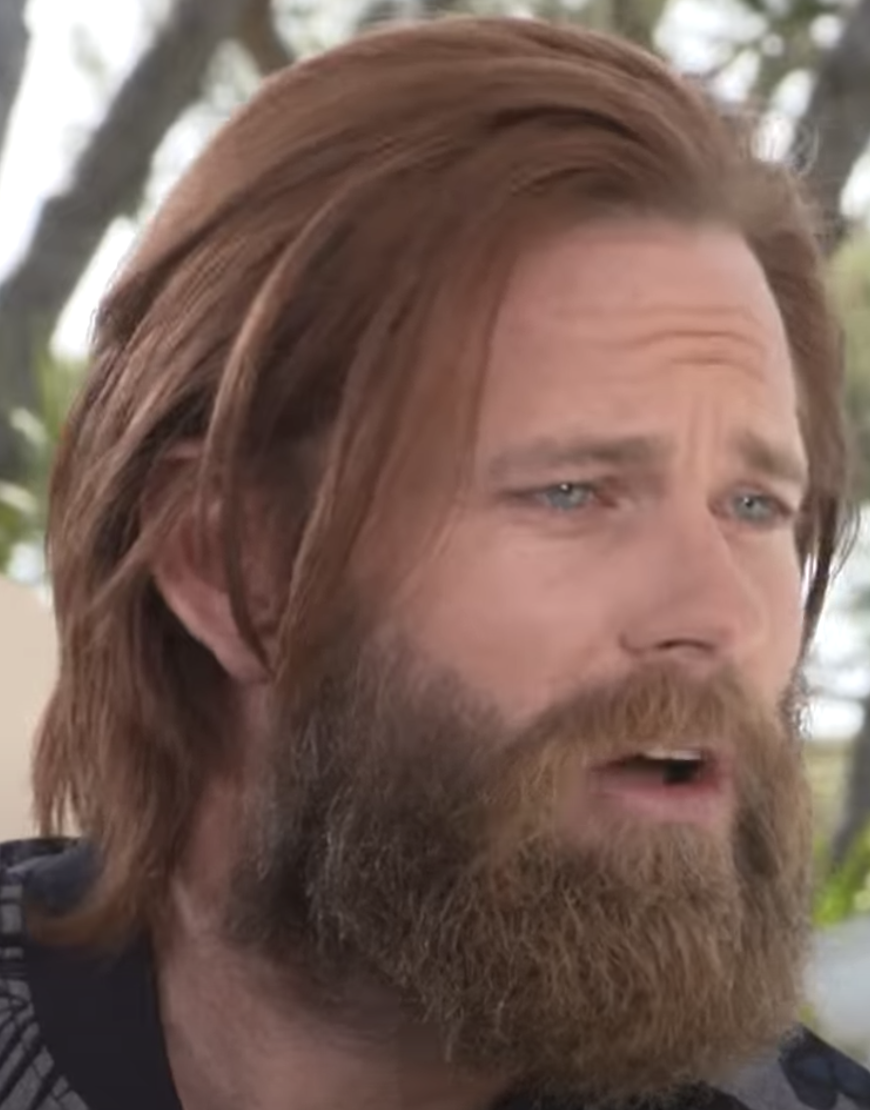
- Johnson in 2018
- Born: Eric Johann Johnson; August 7, 1979 (age 47); Edmonton, Alberta, Canada
- Occupation: Actor
- Years active: 1992–present
- Spouse: Adria Budd (m. 2004)
- Children: 1

Eric Johann Johnson (born August 7, 1979) is a Canadian actor. He is known for playing Flash Gordon on the eponymous 2007–2008 television series, Whitney Fordman on the superhero series Smallville, Detective Luke Callaghan on the police drama Rookie Blue, and Jack Hyde in the Fifty Shades film series. In 2022, he played a misogynist corrupt sheriff in the HBO Max horror series Pretty Little Liars.

== Career ==
Johnson began his career acting at the age of nine, when his parents enrolled him in Stage Polaris, a theater company in Edmonton. Johnson played the younger version of Brad Pitt's character in 1994 film Legends of the Fall. In Canada, Johnson was the lead in an award-winning film titled Scorn. His break-out role came in 2001, as football jock and Clark Kent rival Whitney Fordman in Smallville.

In 2004, Johnson played the anti-Mormon son, Joshua Steed, in The Work and the Glory and its sequels. A few years later, he played the title role in the television revival of Flash Gordon that debuted on Sci Fi in August 2007; the series was cancelled after one season. On November 27, 2010, Johnson starred as Jake Finley in the Hallmark movie, Debbie Macomber's Mrs. Miracle 2: Miracle In Manhattan. He also portrayed Luke Callahan in the Canadian police drama Rookie Blue and inmate Cal Sweeney, a bank robber, in the Fox series Alcatraz. In 2012, Johnson was cast as the voice actor and physical actor of Sam Fisher in Splinter Cell: Blacklist, replacing Michael Ironside, who voiced the character in previous installments.

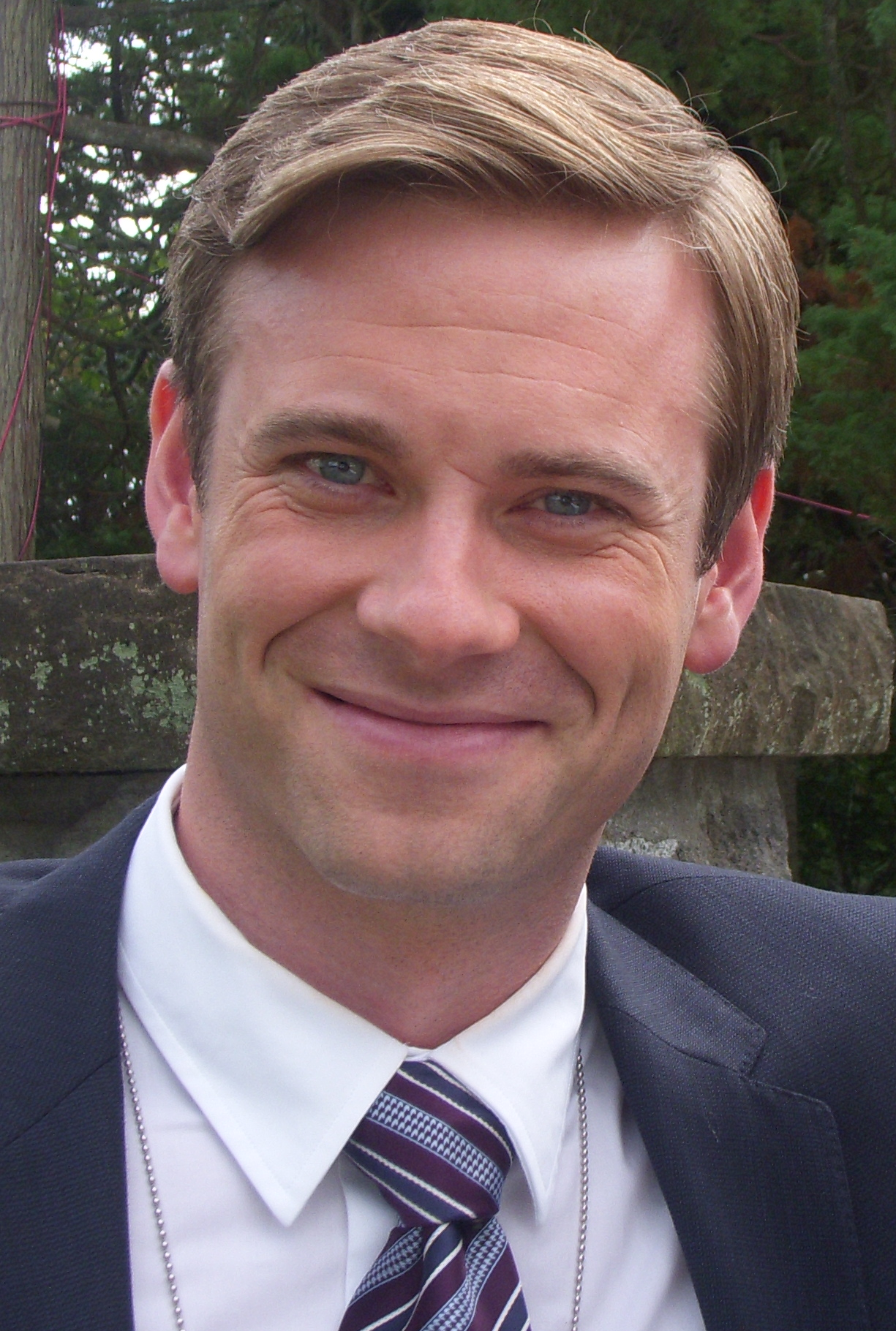
Johnson in 2011

In 2013, Johnson was cast in Cinemax's original medical drama The Knick as a racist, but talented, young medic who is Clive Owen's protege; the series was directed by Steven Soderbergh.

Johnson played villain Jack Hyde in the drama sequels Fifty Shades Darker (2017) and Fifty Shades Freed (2018).

== Personal life ==
Johnson was born in Edmonton, Alberta. His father, Fred, managed a binding corporation, and his mother, Jane, is a librarian, massage therapist, and music teacher. In 2004, Johnson married writer-producer Adria Budd, whom he met on the set of Smallville, as she was Annette O'Toole's and John Glover's personal assistant. They have a child born in 2007.

== Filmography ==
=== Film ===
Year	Title	Role	Notes
1994	Road to Saddle River	Lance	
1994	Legends of the Fall	Teen Tristan	
1998	Oklahoma City: A Survivor's Story	Jason	Television film
1998	Heart of the Sun	Jack	
1999	Question of Privilege	Joel Aldridge	
1999	Atomic Train	Danny	Television film
2000	Borderline Normal	Rocco	Television film
2000	Bear With Me	Scott Robinson	
2000	Scorn	Darren Huenemann	Television film Nominated – Gemini Award for Best Performance by an Actor in a Leading Role in a Dramatic Program or Mini-Series
2000	Children of Fortune	Andrew Bast	Television film
2001	Texas Rangers	Rollins	
2002	Bang Bang You're Dead	Mark Kenworth	Television film
2002	Beauty Shot	Chad Johnson	
2003	Stealing Sinatra	Dean Torrence	
2003	Hollywood Wives: The New Generation	Brian Richter	Television film
2004	A Friend of the Family	Darris Shaw	Television film
2004	Ginger Snaps 2: Unleashed	Tyler	
2004	A Clown's Gift	Sam the Clown	
2004	Blinded	John	
2004	Anonymous Rex	Rhys	Television film
2004	The Work and the Glory	Joshua Steed	
2005	Falcon Beach	Lane Bradshaw	Television film
2005	Marker	Roddy Dutch	Television film
2005	The Work and the Glory: American Zion	Joshua Steed	
2006	Expiration Date	Animal Control Officer #2	
2006	The Work and the Glory: A House Divided	Joshua Steed	
2006	Honeymoon with Mom	Adam	
2009	My Nanny's Secret	Drew	Television film
2010	Meteor Storm	Kyle Pember	Television film
2010	Mrs. Miracle 2: Miracle In Manhattan	Jake Finley	Television film
2013	Oh Christmas Tree!	Darren	Television film
2013	Meteor Storm	Kyle Pember	Television film
2013	Fir Crazy	Darren	Television film
2015	Flash Gordon Classic	Flash Gordon	Animated fan film
2016	Valentine Ever After	Ben	Hallmark Channel TV movie
2017	Fifty Shades Darker	Jack Hyde	
2018	Fifty Shades Freed	Jack Hyde	
2018	A Simple Favor	Davis	
2019	Disappearance at Clifton Hill	Charlie Lake	
2024	Fight Another Day	Ryan Taylor	
2025	The Players	Reinhardt	
2026	How We Stand		

=== Television ===
Year	Title	Role	Notes
1992	The Ray Bradbury Theater		Episode: "The Utterly Perfect Murder"
1999	Night Man	Alex	Episode: "Blader"
1999	Atomic Train	Danny	Two-part miniseries
2001	MythQuest	Telemachus	Episode: "The Oracle"
2001–2004	Smallville	Whitney Fordman	Main cast (season 1), special guest (seasons 2 and 4); 24 episodes
2004	The Collector	Nick	Episode: "The Yogi"
2006, 2013	Criminal Minds	Sean Hotchner	2 episodes
2006	The Dead Zone	Young Gene Purdy	Episode: "Revelations"
2007	Ghost Whisperer	Gordon Pike	Episode: "Speed Demon"
2007	The Unit	Ethan McNeal	Episode: "Games of Chance"
2007	Everest '82	Laurie Skreslet	Mini-series; 4 episodes
2007–2008	Flash Gordon	Steven "Flash" Gordon	Lead Role; 21 episodes
2010–2013	Rookie Blue	Det. Luke Callaghan	35 episodes; Main cast (Seasons 1–2); Recurring (Seasons 3–4)
2010	Supernatural	Brady	Episode: "The Devil You Know"
2012	Alcatraz	Cal Sweeney	Episode: "Cal Sweeny"
2013, 2017	Orphan Black	Chad	3 episodes
2014	Saving Hope	Dr. Jason Kalfis	3 episodes
2014–2015	The Knick	Dr. Everett Gallinger	Main cast; Satellite Award for Best Cast – Television Series (2015)
2016	Valentine Ever After	Tom	Television film (main role)
2018	Caught	Brian Hearn	Main role
2018	The Alienist	Captain Miller	Episode: Psychopathia Sexualis
2019	Hudson & Rex	Darryl Perth	Episode: Trial and Error
2020	Vikings	Erik	Main cast (Season 6); 14 episodes
2020	Condor	Tracy Crane	7 episodes
2021	American Gods	Chad Mulligan	6 episodes
2022	Pretty Little Liars	Sheriff Tom Beasley	Main cast; 8 episodes
2024	A Christmas Less Traveled	Greyson	Television film
2026	I Will Find You	Ross Sumner	

=== Video games ===
Year	Title	Role	Notes
2013	Splinter Cell: Blacklist	Sam Fisher	Voice, likeness, and motion-capture performance
2020	Assassin's Creed: Valhalla	Ivarr the Boneless	Voice
2024	Star Wars Outlaws	Jaylen Vrax	Voice
