= Tom Clancy's Splinter Cell: Pandora Tomorrow =

2004 video game

- Developers: Ubisoft Milan; Ubisoft Shanghai
- Publisher: Ubisoft (Note: Mobile version developed and published by Gameloft.)
- Producer: Domitille Doat-Le Bigot
- Designer: Denis Muffat-Meridol
- Programmer: Wu Ming Jie
- Artist: Frederic Lavignasse
- Writer: J. T. Petty
- Composers: Guy Dubuc; Jack Wall; Marc Lessart
- Series: Tom Clancy's Splinter Cell
- Engine: Unreal Engine 2
- Platforms: Xbox; Windows; Game Boy Advance; Mobile; PlayStation 2; GameCube; PlayStation 3
- Release: March 26, 2004: Game Boy Advance, Xbox; EU: March 26, 2004; NA: March 27, 2004 Windows; NA: March 27, 2004; EU: April 2, 2004 Mobile; WW: March 29, 2004 PlayStation 2; EU: June 11, 2004; NA: June 18, 2004 GameCube; NA: July 15, 2004; EU: July 30, 2004 PlayStation 3; PAL: September 16, 2011; NA: September 27, 2011
- Genres: Action-adventure, stealth
- Modes: Single-player, multiplayer

Tom Clancy's Splinter Cell: Pandora Tomorrow is a 2004 action-adventure stealth game developed and published by Ubisoft. The game is the sequel to Splinter Cell and the second game in the Splinter Cell series endorsed by writer Tom Clancy. It follows the covert activities of Sam Fisher, an agent working for a black-ops branch of the National Security Agency (NSA) called "Third Echelon". Michael Ironside returns to voice Sam Fisher, while Dennis Haysbert voices the character Irving Lambert, Fisher's boss, making this the only time he is not voiced by Don Jordan. Lalo Schifrin provides the theme music for the game.

Splinter Cell: Pandora Tomorrow received positive reviews on release, with critics calling it a strong follow-up and praising its multiplayer component, which would become a staple of the series. Online multiplayer on the original Xbox shut down in 2010, Splinter Cell: Pandora Tomorrow is now playable online again on the replacement Xbox Live servers called Insignia. A side-scrolling adaptation for Game Boy Advance and mobile phones was released to mixed reception. A remastered high definition version was released on PlayStation 3 in September 2011, and an Xbox version was made available for Xbox One via backward compatibility in June 2019. A sequel, titled Chaos Theory, was released in 2005.

== Gameplay ==
Sam Fisher, the game's protagonist, in a camouflage suit during a mission in Pandora Tomorrow

The gameplay of Pandora Tomorrow is largely unchanged from the original Splinter Cell. The game features some moderate graphical improvements, as well as minor gameplay changes such as the fact that health kits are no longer an inventory item, and the addition of a laser sight to Sam's pistol that allows the player to know exactly where the rounds will strike, even when moving around. Also, Sam can now whistle to attract enemies, open doors while carrying a body, shoot while hanging upside down, perform a "SWAT turn" to go past doorways unnoticed (move from one side of the door to other while covered), and perform a half split jump.

The PlayStation 2 and GameCube versions of Pandora Tomorrow also feature an additional single-player mission to compensate for the abridged gameplay compared to the PC and Xbox versions.

== Plot ==
In March 2006, the United States establishes a military presence in the newly-independent country of East Timor to train its military. Several anti-separatist Indonesian guerrilla militias oppose East Timor's formation, one of which is Darah Dan Doa (English: Blood and Prayer) led by Suhadi Sadono, an individual trained by the CIA to fight communism in the region, who has grown resentful of U.S. support for East Timor's independence. Following an attack on the U.S. embassy in Dili, which captures a number of U.S. military and diplomatic personnel, NSA's Third Echelon investigates the situation. Third Echelon's director Irving Lambert informs operative Sam Fisher that his old friend Douglas Shetland, a former soldier turned PMC owner, is among the hostages. Infiltrating the embassy, Fisher learns from Shetland and CIA operative Ingrid Karlthson that Sadono is working alongside an unknown individual identified as "Mortified Penguin", conducting business in Paris.

After the embassy hostages are rescued, the U.S. Army launches a military campaign against Darah Dan Doa, though Indonesia objects to its operations. Meanwhile, Fisher heads to Paris, and finds mercenaries hired by "Mortified" breaking into a cryogenic lab and stealing ND133 containers – self-contained cryogenic containers used for transporting and storing human brains. Third Echelon identifies "Mortified" as Norman Soth, a former U.S. soldier turned CIA agent, who Fisher discovers has gone rogue. Learning that Soth has made a deal with Syrian terrorists operating in Jerusalem, Third Echelon coordinates with Israel's Shin Bet agents, and learns that Soth has purchased containers of manufactured smallpox virus, intending to use them as bioweapons. Lambert discovers the bioweapons are an insurance policy for Sadono, codenamed "Pandora Tomorrow" – if he is killed or captured, the weapons will detonate on U.S. soil and expose Americans to the virus.

With this threat, Sadono appears on the front lines, forcing U.S. troops to retreat in order to avoid direct confrontation. Third Echelon learns that Sadono has to make daily calls to ensure the bioweapons are not detonated prematurely. Lambert assigns Fisher to bug the calls so that they can be traced to Soth's mercenary cells guarding the ND133, with aid from Shetland's PMC outfit, Displace International. The traced calls allow Third Echelon to inform the NSA, who send agents out to find and neutralize all but one of the ND133s, allowing the U.S. army to launch renewed operations against Darah Dan Doa guerillas. Sadono is forced to withdraw from the front lines. Not wishing for a repeat of the "Nikoladze affair" in 2004, Lambert instructs Fisher to find and capture Sadono rather than kill him outright, and hand him over to the CIA. Fisher works with Karlthson in capturing Sadono at a television station in Jakarta. The conflict ends, and diplomatic ties between the U.S. and East Timor are strengthened.

Third Echelon continues hunting for the last smallpox-armed ND133, and discovers that Soth and his mercenaries possess it, with the intention of detonating it inside Los Angeles International Airport. Lambert reveals Soth's actions were not motivated by Indonesia, but rather by a perceived betrayal by the U.S. in an incident that lost him one of his legs. Fisher infiltrates the terminal building, kills Soth and his men, and secures the ND133. Disguised as a maintenance worker, Fisher places the device near two policemen, who evacuate the airport upon spotting it, and call in the Los Angeles Police Department's bomb squad to perform a controlled explosion of the device.

== Development ==
Pandora Tomorrow was developed under the title of Shadow Strike. Much of the game itself was built upon the original engine of the first game, but with notable efforts to improve on it with newer elements, including some changes to the gameplay, and additional moves that could be used in the movement and stealth elements of the game. Compared to the Xbox version, development of additional console versions for the PlayStation 2 and GameCube were created, but gameplay had to be reconfigured towards an abridged style of gameplay. To compensate, developers established an additional mission for both versions that was not made for Xbox.

=== Windows version ===
As with the original Splinter Cell, development of the Windows version focused on being a port of the Xbox version, duplicating its user interface and gameplay. However, the Windows version was designed to run at higher resolutions than the console versions, with the "checkpoint" save system from the Xbox version being replaced with the ability to save the game at any time and the controls reworked to allow simultaneous use of a keyboard and mouse, with movement speed being controlled by the mouse wheel. None of the bonus content from the other versions was made present for Windows.

=== PlayStation 3 ===
A PlayStation 3 version of the game was released in September 2011 as part of the Splinter Cell Trilogy in Sony's Classics HD series. It is a port of the PC version, which had better graphical detail than previous console versions. It does not include multiplayer modes, but has trophy support.

=== Game Boy Advance ===
The GBA version was released on March 26, 2004, in Europe and March 27, 2004, in North America.

== Reception ==
Reception

Aggregate score
Aggregator	Score
Metacritic	(Xbox) 93/100 (PS2) 87/100 (PC) 87/100 (GC) 78/100 (GBA) 68/100

Review scores
Publication	Score
Electronic Gaming Monthly	(Xbox) 9.67/10 (PS2) 9.17/10 (GC) 7.5/10 (GBA) 4.67/10
Eurogamer	8/10
Famitsu	(Xbox) 32/40 (PS2) 30/40
Game Informer	(Xbox) 9.5/10; 8.75/10 (GBA) 8/10
GamePro	(Xbox) 5/5; 4.5/5 (GBA) 3.5/5
GameRevolution	(Xbox) A (PS2) B+ (GC) B
GameSpot	9.1/10 (Mobile) 9/10 (PS2) 8.2/10 (GBA) 6.2/10 (GC) 6.1/10
GameSpy	(Xbox) 5/5; 4/5 (GC & GBA) 3/5
GameZone	(PC) 9.7/10 (Xbox) 9.6/10 (PS2) 8.8/10 (GC) 7/10
IGN	9.5/10 (PS2) 8.2/10 (GC) 8/10 (GBA) 7/10
Nintendo Power	(GC) 4/5 (GBA) 3.9/5
Official U.S. PlayStation Magazine	5/5
Official Xbox Magazine (US)	9.5/10
PC Gamer (US)	90%
Entertainment Weekly	A
The Times	5/5

Splinter Cell: Pandora Tomorrow received "universal acclaim" from critics for the Xbox version, while the PC, PS2, and GameCube received "generally favorable" reviews, and the Game Boy Advance received "mixed or average" reviews, according to review aggregator website Metacritic. In addition, Rotten Tomatoes gave the game a score of 100% "Fresh Rating" for the Xbox version; a 95% "Fresh Rating" for the PS2 version; a 90% "Fresh Rating" for the PC version; a 55% "Rotten Rating" for the GameCube version; and a 27% "Rotten Rating" for the GBA version.

Greg Kasavin of GameSpot gave the Xbox and PC versions a score of 9.1 and said that the single-player and multiplayer portions of the game will appeal to anyone interested in high-tech stealth and subterfuge. He also said that players familiar with the first Splinter Cell should expect 10 hours or more of gameplay. Kasavin said the storyline in Pandora Tomorrow was more cohesive than the original Splinter Cell, but the gameplay often becomes pure trial and error, noting that the missions "could have benefited from feeling less rigid and scripted" but were "incredibly slick." Kasavin also praised the multiplayer mode for its innovation, complexity, and creativity. Mongoose of Game Chronicles Magazine also gave the Xbox version a 9.4 out of 10 and gave special praise to the multiplayer portion of the game. He called the game "the single best reason to get online" on Xbox Live. However, he felt that gameplay in the single-player campaign at times got increasingly linear and leaned toward scripted challenges, with "only one solution to any given problem", requiring "the use of a particular gadget or one of Sam's nimble moves."

Entertainment Weekly gave the Xbox version an A and said that it "seems less like a sequel and more like an extension of the first game, with a few nice enhancements and some more dark and dangerous environments." Playboy gave the game 100% and stated that "A new online mode allows four players to stalk one another. Take an opponent hostage and use your headset to describe all the pain you plan to inflict on him." The Times gave it all five stars and called it "a miniature masterpiece". The Village Voice gave the Xbox version a perfect ten and said, "No multiplayer title has ever bound and balanced two wholly different games this way."

=== Sales ===
By the end of March 2004, Tom Clancy's Splinter Cell: Pandora Tomorrow had sold 1.7 million copies. Its total sales reached 2.7 million units by the end of June, and rose to 2.8 million by September.

=== Awards ===
GameSpot named Pandora Tomorrow the best Xbox game of March 2004. The editors of Computer Gaming World nominated Pandora Tomorrow for their 2004 "Action Game of the Year" award, which ultimately went to The Chronicles of Riddick: Escape from Butcher Bay. During the 8th Annual Interactive Achievement Awards, the Academy of Interactive Arts & Sciences awarded Pandora Tomorrow with "Computer Action/Adventure Game of the Year", along with a nomination for "Console Action/Adventure Game of the Year".
