= Tom Clancy's Ghost Recon (disambiguation) =

Tom Clancy's Ghost Recon is a video game franchise.

Tom Clancy's Ghost Recon may also refer to:

- Tom Clancy's Ghost Recon (2001 video game), the first game in the series
- Tom Clancy's Ghost Recon (2010 video game), a Wii exclusive video game
- Tom Clancy's Ghost Recon (novel)
