= Tom Clancy's Ghost Recon: Desert Siege =

- Developer: Red Storm Entertainment
- Publisher: Ubi Soft (Note: Mac OS X version published by Aspyr)
- Series: Tom Clancy's Ghost Recon
- Platform: Microsoft Windows
- Release: NA: March 26, 2002; EU: March 29, 2002
- Genre: Tactical shooter
- Mode: Single-player

Tom Clancy's Ghost Recon: Desert Siege is a 2002 expansion pack for Tom Clancy's Ghost Recon developed by Red Storm Entertainment and published by Ubi Soft for Microsoft Windows. It is also an unlockable campaign in the PlayStation 2 version of Ghost Recon. Set in the Horn of Africa one year after the events of the base game, Desert Siege follows the "Ghosts", an elite special forces unit of the United States Army, as they intervene in a war between Ethiopia and Eritrea.

== Plot ==
In 2009, relations between Eritrea and Ethiopia rapidly deteriorate into war after Colonel Tesfaye Wolde of the Ethiopian National Defense Force, who had conducted illegal arms trades with Russian ultranationalists to finance their war the previous year, overthrows the Ethiopian government in a coup d'état and launches an irredentist invasion of Eritrea. With the international community's attention drawn after the conflict threatens shipping lanes in the Red Sea, and the Eritrean government making international pleas for assistance, the United States mobilizes the Ghosts to liberate Eritrea.

After deploying to Eritrea, the Ghosts destroy an Ethiopian occupation camp near a beach, retake control of an Ethiopian-controlled Eritrean oil refinery, capture an Ethiopian-held train depot, and protect a humanitarian aid convoy, before managing to force the Ethiopians out of Eritrea and capture one of Wolde's high-ranking lieutenants. Enraged by the failures of his plans, a defiant Wolde orders one final invasion of Eritrea by personally leading a tank column across the border, but the Ghosts intercept and kill him. With Wolde dead and his remaining forces in disarray, the Ethiopian military surrenders, the legitimate government of Ethiopia is restored, and Eritrea is liberated.

== Reception ==
Reception

Aggregate scores
Aggregator	Score
GameRankings	83.17%
Metacritic	82/100

Review scores
Publication	Score
AllGame	4.5/5
Eurogamer	9/10
GameSpot	8/10
GameSpy	80%
GameZone	8.5/10
IGN	8.6/10
PC Gamer (US)	90%
PC Zone	89%

Tom Clancy's Ghost Recon: Desert Siege was met with positive reception upon release; GameRankings gave it a score of 83.17%, while Metacritic gave it 82 out of 100.
