= Dominant Species =

Dominant species may mean:

- Dominant species (ecology), one of a small number of species which dominate in an ecological community
- Dominant Species (novel) by Michael E. Marks
- Dominant Species (board game)
- Dominant Species (video game)
- Dominant Species (album), an album by New Zealand singer King Kapisi
