= Tom Clancy's Ghost Recon 2: Summit Strike =

2005 video game

- Developer: Red Storm Entertainment
- Publisher: Ubisoft
- Designers: Christian Allen; Jeff McGann
- Series: Tom Clancy's Ghost Recon
- Engine: Red Storm engine
- Platform: Xbox
- Release: NA: August 2, 2005; AU: August 25, 2005; UK: August 26, 2005
- Genre: Tactical shooter
- Modes: Single-player, multiplayer

Tom Clancy's Ghost Recon 2: Summit Strike is a 2005 expansion pack for Tom Clancy's Ghost Recon 2, developed by Red Storm Entertainment and published by Ubisoft for the Xbox. Set in Kazakhstan one year after the events of the Xbox version's campaign, Summit Strike follows the "Ghosts", an elite special forces unit of the United States Army, as they combat a powerful terrorist organization taking advantage of internal destabilization. It includes new multiplayer modes, such as "Heli Hunt", and features increased difficulty compared to the base game.

== Plot ==
In 2012, Asad Rahil, a Pakistani arms dealer and terrorist who sells smuggled materiel from corrupt Kazakh military contacts, leads a raid on a chemical weapon disposal facility in Kyrgyzstan and uses gas shells against an intervening militia, killing over 500 people. When the Kazakh President and the Security Council of Kazakhstan uncover Rahil's scheme, he masterminds a bomb attack in Almaty that assassinates the President and the entire Security Council, causing the Kazakh government and military to splinter into warring factions. United Nations peacekeepers deploy to Kazakhstan and Kyrgyzstan, and the UN requests that the United States deploy the Ghosts to assist stabilization efforts and bring Rahil to justice.

The Ghosts, led by Captain Mitchell, deploy to the region to assist Gregoriy Koslov, a Kazakh military specialist investigating corruption for the UN. After defeating Rahil's forces in raids on their positions and rescuing Koslov's men from captivity, Rahil attempts to capture Astana to seize power in Kazakhstan, and the Ghosts support Kazakh loyalists and UN peacekeepers as they fight for control over the city. Though Rahil's army briefly captures Astana and inflicts numerous setbacks against Kazakh and UN forces, they and the Ghosts eventually liberate the city and expel Rahil and his men into the Kazakh countryside.

The Ghosts work with UN peacekeepers to take back a satellite launch facility from Rahil's army, but learn Koslov has disobeyed orders and broken off from the UN contingent to pursue Rahil personally. The Ghosts are tasked with catching up to Koslov and, after preventing Rahil's forces from stealing uranium from an old Soviet nuclear storage facility, learn Koslov and his unit have been killed. The UN eventually tracks down Rahil to a canyon fortress, and the Ghosts assault the stronghold and kill Rahil when he tries to escape. Three months later, Kazakhstan has successfully restabilized and celebrates their first elections since the conflict, while Mitchell and the Ghosts leave Kazakhstan after visiting Koslov's grave.

== Reception ==
Reception

Aggregate scores
| Aggregator | Score |
|---|---|
| GameRankings | 83.49% |
| Metacritic | 84/100 |

Review scores
| Publication | Score |
|---|---|
| Eurogamer | 8/10 |
| Game Informer | 8/10 |
| GameSpot | 8.2/10 |
| GameSpy | 4.5/5 |
| GameTrailers | 9/10 |
| GameZone | 8.9/10 |
| IGN | 8.5/10 |
| Official Xbox Magazine (US) | 9/10 |
| TeamXbox | 8.6/10 |
| X-Play | 4/5 |
| Detroit Free Press | 4/4 |
| Maxim | 8/10 |

Summit Strike was met with positive reception upon release; GameRankings gave it a score of 83.49%, while Metacritic gave it 84 out of 100.
