= Politika (disambiguation) =

Politika is a Serbian newspaper.

Politika may also refer to:

== Arts, media and entertainment ==
- Politika a.d., a Serbian media corporation, owner of several media outlets
  - RTV Politika, a former Serbian TV station
- Politics (Aristotle) (Greek: Politiká), a work of political philosophy by Aristotle
- "Politika", a novel in the series Tom Clancy's Power Plays
  - Tom Clancy's Politika, a Risk-like game for the PC

== See also ==
- Polityka, a Polish newsmagazine
- Politics (disambiguation)
- Policy (disambiguation)
