= Tom Clancy's Ghost Recon Wildlands =

2017 video game

- Developers: Ubisoft Paris; Ubisoft Milan (Note: Additional work by Ubisoft Bucharest, Ubisoft Reflections, Ubisoft Montpellier, Ubisoft Annecy and Ubisoft Belgrade)
- Publisher: Ubisoft
- Director: Eric Couzian
- Producer: Jean-François Capizzi
- Designers: Elie Benhamou; Dominic Butler
- Programmers: Vincent Delassus; Lionel Bouchet; Yvan Laval
- Artists: Vincent Delassus; Benoit Martinez
- Writers: Sam Strachman; Don Winslow; Shane Salerno
- Composer: Alain Johannes
- Series: Tom Clancy's Ghost Recon
- Engine: AnvilNext 2.0
- Platforms: Microsoft Windows; PlayStation 4 Xbox One; Stadia
- Release: March 7, 2017; Stadia; November 19, 2020
- Genre: Tactical shooter
- Modes: Single-player, multiplayer

Tom Clancy's Ghost Recon Wildlands is a third-person tactical shooter video game developed by Ubisoft Paris and Ubisoft Milan, and published by Ubisoft. It was released worldwide on March 7, 2017, for Microsoft Windows, PlayStation 4, and Xbox One as the tenth installment in the Tom Clancy's Ghost Recon franchise and is the first game in the Ghost Recon series to feature an open world environment.

The game moves away from the futuristic setting introduced in Tom Clancy's Ghost Recon Advanced Warfighter and instead features a setting similar to the original Tom Clancy's Ghost Recon. Ubisoft described it as one of the biggest open world games that they have published, with the game world including a wide variety of environments such as mountains, forests, deserts, and salt flats.

Tom Clancy's Ghost Recon Wildlands received generally mixed to positive reviews from critics. The game sold over 10 million units by March 2020. A sequel, Tom Clancy's Ghost Recon Breakpoint, was released on October 4, 2019.

== Gameplay ==
Wildlands features a wide range of environments, including mountains and deserts, which can be explored by using a parachute.

Tom Clancy's Ghost Recon Wildlands is a tactical cover based shooter game set in an open world environment and played from a third-person perspective with an optional first-person view for gun aiming. Players control members of the Delta Company, First Battalion, 5th Special Forces Group, also known as "Ghosts", an elite special operations unit of the United States Army under the Joint Special Operations Command. It does not feature the futuristic setting used in Advanced Warfighter and Future Soldier, and instead adopts a modern-day setting, similar to the original Tom Clancy's Ghost Recon. As a result, the equipment featured in the game is based on contemporary weapons and gear commonly used by military forces around the world. It features some original equipment, such as flying drones that can be used to tag enemies and show objectives. These drones have limited use beyond reconnaissance until upgraded, unlocking several abilities that can be used for tactical benefit.

The game is the first entry in the series to feature an open world environment. Set in contemporary Bolivia, the map consists of nine different types of terrain, such as mountains, jungles, forests, deserts, salt flats, and more. It also introduces a dynamic weather system as well as a day-night cycle. Completing missions during daytime allows players to spot enemies more easily, while completing missions at night offers better concealment and easier infiltration due to some guardsmen being asleep. Players are tasked with making observations and planning out their course of action before carrying out missions. A variety of vehicles, such as dirt bikes, helicopters and dune buggies, are featured in the game. Unlike its predecessors, Wildlands features several side-missions.

Players traverse the world through a variety of methods, including driving, flying, boating, and hiking, the most appealing option often depending on the current objective. Players use varying strategies and tactics to complete missions, including utilizing stealth to clear a base without alerting enemies or launching open attacks on targets. The game features outposts that can be taken down by players. Players can grab enemies at close range with one hand for defense as human shields, while using the other hand to shoot. Players can gain experience points to level up. The playable character can be customized, and loot found on enemies' corpses can be equipped by player characters. Weapons and gear can be upgraded as well. According to the creative director of the game, the AI of the game is unscripted and has their "own motivations and agendas".

Each of the 21 provinces on the map is controlled by a buchon, who is associated with one of four divisions of the cartel's operations: Influence, Security, Production and Smuggling. Clearing missions in an area and collecting key intel unlocks missions where players can target a buchon and eliminate them by killing or capturing the target (with some exceptions). Eliminating enough buchones in an operations division allows players to target that division's underboss, and eliminating that underboss and all of the buchones in an operations division leaves the division head vulnerable. Capturing this division head cripples and destabilizes the division and makes the cartel boss more vulnerable. It features cooperative multiplayer mode, in which players can be joined by up to three other players to explore the game's world and to complete campaign missions. The game can be played solo, in which the player will be accompanied by three AI teammates, which the player can give orders to, if a player wants a more "lone wolf" playstyle they can be disabled via the settings. A competitive multiplayer mode has been released as part of a free update on October 10, 2017. It features an elimination type of game mode in a timed 4v4 match with revives. Players can level up through multiplayer gameplay which enables them to improve the different class of characters available.

== Plot ==
=== Setting ===
In July 2019 the Mexican Santa Blanca drug cartel, led by the brutal and religious El Sueño, (Note: English translation: "The Dream") has turned Bolivia into the world's largest producer of cocaine. After months of fighting, the government's elite force La Unidad has agreed a truce with the cartel, and some of its personnel secretly work for Santa Blanca. When a bomb hits the American embassy in La Paz and the cartel executes undercover DEA agent Ricardo "Ricky" Sandoval, the United States deploys a Ghost Recon fireteam: team leader Nomad, vehicle specialist Midas, hacker Holt and sniper Weaver.

=== Campaign ===
As part of Operation Kingslayer, a joint CIA, DEA and JSOC operation, the Ghosts work with CIA officer Karen Bowman, a close friend of Sandoval's, and Pac Katari's Kataris 26 rebels. They dismantle the cartel by destroying its drug production, disrupting its smuggling, cutting its political support and turning its senior figures against each other, killing or capturing El Sueño's lieutenants along the way. El Sueño tries to bribe the Ghosts into working for him, but they refuse.

Audio tapes recovered during the campaign reveal that Sandoval had become disillusioned with his mission and with his superiors' reluctance to act. A final tape, offered by El Sueño, shows that Sandoval himself carried out the embassy bombing and framed the cartel to force a US intervention. Angered but undeterred, Bowman and the Ghosts press on.

Katari then claims to have located El Sueño, but the Ghosts instead find the body of Amaru, the rebels' ideological figurehead. Katari breaks the alliance and captures Bowman, arguing that the rebels must kill El Sueño themselves so as not to look like American puppets. The Ghosts rescue Bowman and reach El Sueño's mausoleum, where he has beheaded Katari. El Sueño surrenders, but Bowman learns that he has struck a deal with the Department of Justice for immunity and witness protection in exchange for information on other cartels.

If the cartel has not been fully dismantled, Bowman executes El Sueño, believing he would otherwise become a US-backed dictator, and is arrested. In the canon ending, with the cartel destroyed, she takes him into protective custody. Bowman predicts that once his intelligence runs out, El Sueño will either be extradited or released to start the cycle again, and she and the Ghosts prepare for the next fight.

=== Post-launch content ===
==== Narco Road ====
An unnamed Ghost goes undercover in Bolivia for the CIA, posing as a mercenary to identify "El Invisible", the anonymous head of Santa Blanca's smuggling network. Aided by CIA handler Karen Bowman and Señor Sonrisa, a fisherman working as a CIA informant, the Ghost gathers clues from the smuggling gang leaders before assassinating each of them. After escaping imprisonment by El Invisible, the Ghost recovers the device he uses to run the network, but decrypting it unleashes a virus that compromises the CIA. The Ghost realises that Sonrisa is El Invisible and that he had staged the operation to attack the CIA and disappear. Two years later Sonrisa is tracked down to Arizona, where the Ghost kills him at his fishing cabin.

==== Fallen Ghosts ====
After Operation Kingslayer, the cocaine trade has collapsed and the Kataris 26 rebels have fallen into in-fighting. A rebuilt Unidad, made up of special forces from across Latin America and known as "Los Extranjeros", has taken over cocaine production. When Sonrisa's data breach exposes the CIA's agents in Bolivia, Nomad's team returns to extract them, but their helicopter is shot down. Joined by CIA officer Socrates, the Ghosts instead target Los Extranjeros' commanders and rebuild the Kataris 26. The death of their leader, Colonel Juan Ignacio Merlo, causes the group to collapse, and evidence of its crimes brings down the Bolivian government.

==== Predator ====
Investigating a series of brutal killings in the jungle, Nomad's team finds skinned corpses and a crashed alien vessel, and defeats an alien hunter, which then self-destructs. The team decides not to tell Bowman about the encounter.

==== Operation Watchman ====
Sam Fisher borrows the Ghosts to help recover sensitive intelligence from a rogue CIA officer at a Unidad base. Fisher kills the officer and erases data on Skell Technology research that could "change the future of warfare", then leaves to hunt for missing nuclear devices.

==== Operation Archangel ====
Bowman asks the Ghosts to help Rainbow Six operatives Valkyrie and Twitch find their teammate Taina "Caveira" Pereira, who has gone AWOL and has been killing Santa Blanca members. The team learns that Caveira is searching for her younger brother João ("Dengoso"), an undercover Brazilian Federal Police officer whose cover has been blown and who is being held by the cartel. The Ghosts help Caveira rescue him. When Bowman demands that Dengoso share what he knows about El Sueño, Nomad defuses the standoff by letting him leave with Rainbow.

==== Operation Silent Spade ====
Lieutenant Colonel Scott Mitchell sends the Ghosts, with new member John Kozak, to stop Russian Ultranationalists from leaving Bolivia with weapons-grade uranium mined with Santa Blanca's help. Missing uranium leads the team to a dirty bomb meant for the pro-rebel city of Barvechos. Unable to disarm it, they drive it off a cliff into a mine.

==== Operation Oracle ====
At a Unidad facility testing drones reverse-engineered from classified Skell-Tech designs, Nomad's team meets fellow Ghost Cole D. Walker. Walker blames Bowman for the deaths of his team, who were killed by the drones. The engineer who leaked the designs, Daniel Rodriguez Arellano, turns out to be a compromised CIA asset who sold out Bowman to Unidad to protect his family, and Walker executes him. After the Ghosts rescue Bowman from Unidad, she says she was Daniel's handler but did not know the full extent of his mission. Nomad persuades a distrustful Walker to trust her.

==== Last Rites ====
In 2023 the Ghosts return to Bolivia under enigmatic CIA handler Emily Price to eliminate La Llorona, leader of the violent cult Los Penitentes. They discover that La Llorona is Ines Cortes, a disavowed CIA asset whose cover inside the cartel was leaked to her husband, who murdered their children. Price joins the raid on Cortes's stronghold in the Alta Gracia mines and has the Ghosts take her alive against CIA orders. Cortes then plays a recording revealing that Price herself had authorised the leak. The Ghosts extract Cortes, who is officially declared dead, and Price leaves for Nagan.

== Development ==
=== Concept and pre-production ===
Wildlands was developed by Ubisoft Paris, which had previously made Ghost Recon: Future Soldier, with Ubisoft Annecy, Ubisoft Bucharest, Ubisoft Montpellier, Ubisoft Milan and Ubisoft Reflections as associate studios. Development began in 2012. Creative director Eric Couzian said that the original Ghost Recon already had large maps and freedom of choice, so an open world was the natural next step given newer technology. Senior producer Nouredine Abboud said the project began with a prototype team of about 30 people and grew to involve seven Ubisoft studios over five years, with about 3,000 people eventually credited. Reflections handled the vehicles, Ubisoft Shanghai contributed art, and Bucharest and Ubisoft Belgrade worked on the player-versus-player mode and post-launch content.

The game was revealed at the end of Ubisoft's E3 2015 press conference, billed as the largest open world the company had created.

=== Setting and research ===
Couzian said Bolivia was chosen through a Tom Clancy-style "what if" scenario in which Mexican cartels, already controlling drug trafficking, take over cocaine production in one of the few countries where coca is grown. In 2012 more than 30 developers spent two weeks travelling across Bolivia and consulting locals. They returned with about 15,000 photographs and 15 hours of video, and identified 11 distinct ecosystems that formed the basis of the game's biomes. The fictionalised map recreates landmarks such as Laguna Colorada, the Yungas Road, the train cemetery near Uyuni, and the silver mines of Potosí. A roadside scarecrow seen on the trip inspired some of the cartel's religious imagery. Some team members also spent time with an elite Bolivian army unit fighting drug traffickers, which Ubisoft's Tommy François said changed their understanding of how traditional coca use differs from cocaine.

=== Story and characters ===
Narrative director Sam Strachman described the premise as a near-future scenario in which the Santa Blanca cartel turns Bolivia into a narco-state. The cartel is divided into four branches that the player can attack in any order, and its "influence" branch draws on the folk religion of Santa Muerte. Two of the main writers were Mexican nationals, a journalist and a documentary filmmaker, who were not named for the safety of their families. Novelist Don Winslow and screenwriter Shane Salerno also worked on the script. A 30-minute prequel short film, Ghost Recon Wildlands: War Within the Cartel, directed by Avi Youabian and starring Tip "T.I." Harris, was released on February 16, 2017.

=== Gameplay and design ===
According to lead game designer Dominic Butler, the game was designed from the start to be played alone with three AI-controlled teammates who can be replaced at any time by human players, with no restriction keeping co-op players close together. The teammate AI, built by a small team at Ubisoft Montpellier, was meant to support the player without stealing the spotlight, and is allowed deliberate "cheats", such as guaranteed shots and teleporting, to ensure revives succeed.

=== Technology ===
The game uses a modified version of the AnvilNext engine. Ubisoft Paris built a custom terrain toolset: the base landscape was generated in World Machine, and procedural tools built in Houdini placed roads, rivers, vegetation and settlements, which artists then refined by hand. By investing in tools rather than staff, Paris never needed more than 15 level artists. The technology was presented at the 2017 Game Developers Conference. The world contains more than 800 km of roads and about five million trees. The PC version was developed with Nvidia and supports GameWorks effects, 4K and ultrawide displays, and an uncapped frame rate, features Ubisoft said were shaped by beta feedback.

=== Audio and music ===
The score was composed by Alain Johannes, who recorded it with Joey Castillo, Nick Oliveri and Norm Block, making heavy use of the charango and a cigar-box guitar. The main theme quotes a motif from Tom Salta's music for Ghost Recon Advanced Warfighter, and the audio team spent almost two weeks recording ambient sound across Bolivia. A separate album of narcocorridos, Corrido – The Sounds of Santa Blanca, was released on May 2, 2017.

=== Release and post-launch support ===
In February 2016 Ubisoft listed Wildlands among its releases for the fiscal year ending March 2017, and at E3 2016 it announced a release date of March 7, 2017. Standard, Deluxe and Gold editions were announced in May 2016. A closed beta in early February 2017 and an open beta later that month drew more than 6.8 million players, a record for Ubisoft.

Two paid expansions, Narco Road and Fallen Ghosts, were announced before launch. The free 4v4 player-versus-player mode Ghost War followed on October 10, 2017, along with free crossover content: a Predator hunt in December 2017, a 2018 mission with Michael Ironside reprising his role as Sam Fisher from Splinter Cell, and in 2019 Operation Oracle, which introduced Cole D. Walker ahead of the sequel Ghost Recon Breakpoint. By April 2018, 10 million players had played the game.

== Reception ==
Reception

Aggregate score
| Aggregator | Score |
|---|---|
| Metacritic | (PC) 69/100 (PS4) 70/100 (XONE) 76/100 |

Review scores
| Publication | Score |
|---|---|
| Destructoid | 2.5/10 |
| Electronic Gaming Monthly | 3/5 |
| Game Informer | 8.25/10 |
| GameRevolution | 4/5 |
| GameSpot | 7/10 |
| GamesRadar+ | 4.5/5 |
| GameStar | 85/100 (scored with new multi-player) |
| IGN | 7.9/10 |
| PC Gamer (US) | 67/100 |
| Push Square | 6/10 |
| The Guardian | 3/5 |
| USgamer | 4/5 |
| VideoGamer.com | 6/10 |

=== Pre-release ===
As the game was revealed at E3 2015, some critics called the announcement one of the most surprising reveals during E3. Wildlands was nominated for IGN's E3 2015 Game of the Show, Best PlayStation 4 Game, Best Xbox One Game and Best PC Game awards, and received one of GameSpot's Best of E3 2015 awards. It was also named the best co-operative and the best shooter by Game Informer in their Best of E3 2015 Awards. The beta of the game was released on Steam and lasted from February 23 to February 27, 2017. On March 1, 2017, Ubisoft revealed that Tom Clancy's Ghost Recon Wildlands' beta-phase had attracted more than 6.8 million players, making it its most successful beta to date.

=== Post-release ===
Tom Clancy's Ghost Recon Wildlands received "generally favorable" reviews for the Xbox One version of the game, while the PlayStation 4 and PC versions received "mixed or average" reviews from critics, according to review aggregator Metacritic, selling four million copies in the first six months, alone. The Guardian praised the size of the open world but noted the civilians seem not to bother much about the presence of armored men and, as the reviewer put it, "the warfare being waged around them". However The Guardian praised how the villains are written; they are "if not three- then at least two-dimensional characters". The Guardian's reviewer appreciated the multiplayer, but wrote "By comparison, solo play can feel a little soulless". Game Informer's reviewer was impressed by big and varied open world. He praised the thematic diversity of missions, however he writes that most of them boil down to clearing or infiltrating enemy bases.

Both The Guardian's and Game Informer's reviewer noted that careful plans can be disrupted by enemy patrols. The Guardian's reviewer stated that the shooting which then begins is not much in Tom Clancy's style. Game Informer's reviewer wrote: "I appreciated how this x-factor makes you think on your toes, but I came to hate how frequently they [the patrolmen] appeared out of nowhere". In conclusion, The Guardian rated the game 3 out of 5 stars and Game Informer rated it 8.25 out of 10.

EGM reviewer was critical about the controls: "Aiming feels notably stiff and imprecise, even after aggressive fiddling with the game options" and "vehicle control feels far too loose". The EGM reviewer, however, praised array of gadgets, like drone and explosives, as well as support options like mortar strikes and vehicle drop-offs. Push Square, on the other hand, described the gadgets in the game as "the most uninteresting roster imaginable with even the most exciting – a parachute and mortar bombardment – failing to raise your pulse at all". Push Square considered the game has entertaining elements, namely "a nice mix of stealth and action, a squad at your command, and enemies that'll mostly drop with a burst of bullets"; however, he felt the game does not "feel like a Ghost Recon game". He blamed the open world, which, as he admitted, has "some truly impressive environments", but results in making mission design and enemy AI worse.

GameStar praised varied scenery and sharp textures. They called the shooting "convincing" and praised multiplayer, both co-op as well as player vs player. However, they criticised writing of the story, the dialogue and characters. In the end they scored the game 85 out of 100. Destructoid reviewer wrote of missions which are very difficult to complete. USgamer reviewer partly agreed, writing about frustrating missions, but finding solutions for some missions which are "bending the rules of the game by doing something unrealistic, or that simply feels like cheating". Destructoid reviewer, even though he listed various types of missions in the game, concluded: "Every mission is practically the same, both in terms of structure and context". USGamer agreed, writing: "the deeper I've gotten into the game, the more repetition I've begun to experience in terms of its missions". Destructoid reviewer criticised the open world, even though he admits the graphics are fine: "Everything feels like a cheap movie set, rather than a detailed, lived-in world. Yes, the lighting is great and the vistas look beautiful, but none of that matters if the sandbox is little more than a stretch of land in between objective markers." Here, USGamer disagreed, writing: "Graphically stunning, absolutely massive, and packing some marvelous views and vistas, the developers at Ubisoft Paris have done an incredible job of creating a fantastic game world in which to play." USGamer reviewer was amazed by the range of weapons to choose from, including additional accessories. In the end Destructoid gave 2.5 out of 10, and USGamer gave the game 4 out of 5.

In August 2026, Ghost Recon Wildlands received a major 25th-anniversary update featuring visual and gameplay enhancements alongside Last Rites, a new six-mission story set in a darker, more oppressive Bolivia. Despite its relatively short story, the update was well received and renewed interest in the future of the Ghost Recon series. The update also added 4K/60FPS support for console users and restored the Predator DLC pack and mission, which was previously removed in December 2020 after the license had expired.

=== Controversy ===
In March 2017, the Bolivian government expressed their dissatisfaction over the game's portrayal of their country as a violent narco-state, and filed a formal complaint to the French embassy in La Paz. Bolivia's Interior Minister Carlos Romero stated that the country has the standing to take legal action. Ubisoft responded with the following statement; "Tom Clancy's Ghost Recon Wildlands is a work of fiction, similar to movies or TV shows. Like all Tom Clancy's games from Ubisoft, the game takes place in a modern universe inspired by reality, but the characters, locations and stories are all fantasies created solely for entertainment purposes. Bolivia was chosen as the background of this game based on its magnificent landscapes and rich culture. While the game's premise imagines a different reality than the one that exists in Bolivia today, we do hope that the in-game world comes close to representing the country's beautiful topography, and that players enjoy exploring the diverse and open landscapes it moved us to create."

=== Sales ===
Wildlands was the best-selling retail game in both the UK and the US in March 2017, surpassing competitors including Horizon Zero Dawn and The Legend of Zelda: Breath of the Wild. It was also one of the biggest video game launches in 2017, and it became the fastest-selling title in the Tom Clancy's franchise, behind Tom Clancy's The Division. Wildlands was revealed to be the seventh best-selling retail game in 2017 by the NPD Group. More than 15 million players have played the game since its release. In May 2020, Ubisoft revealed that Wildlands (and 10 other games published by them in the 8th console generation) had sold over 10 million units by March 2020.

=== Awards ===
The game was nominated for "Best Co-op Game" at PC Gamer's 2017 Game of the Year Awards. It won the award for "Best Cooperative Multiplayer" at Game Informer's Best of 2017 Awards, and also won the awards for "Best Setting" (Bolivia), "Best Comeback" in multiplayer, and "Best Cooperative Multiplayer" in their 2017 Shooter of the Year Awards. EGMNow ranked the game 23rd on their list of the 25 Best Games of 2017.

| Year | Award | Category | Result | Ref. |
|---|---|---|---|---|
| 2017 | Ping Awards | Best Console Game | Nominated | |
| 2017 | Ping Awards | Best Graphics | Won | |
| 2017 | Ping Awards | Best Screenplay | Nominated | |
| 2018 | 21st Annual D.I.C.E. Awards | Outstanding Achievement in Online Gameplay | Nominated | |
| 2018 | Italian Video Game Awards | People's Choice | Nominated | |

== Sequel ==
In early May 2019, Tom Clancy's Ghost Recon Breakpoint was announced during a livestream event. It serves as a sequel to 2017's Wildlands.
