= Tom Clancy's Ghost Recon Predator =

2010 video game

- European cover art
- Developer: Virtuos
- Publisher: Ubisoft
- Designer: Christian Allen
- Series: Tom Clancy's Ghost Recon
- Platform: PlayStation Portable
- Release: EU: October 1, 2010; AU: October 7, 2010; NA: November 16, 2010
- Genre: Tactical shooter
- Mode: Single-player

Tom Clancy's Ghost Recon Predator is a 2010 tactical shooter video game developed by Virtuos, published by Ubisoft for the PlayStation Portable. Set in Sri Lanka, the game follows the "Ghosts", an elite special forces unit of the United States Army, as they investigate a power struggle in the country. The game's plot is loosely based on the 1987–1989 JVP insurrection.

== Gameplay ==
In Predator, players control a squad of three Ghost special forces soldiers (from a selection of 8 possible characters from 5 different classes including scout, support gunner, marksman, shotgunner, and medic) to hunt terrorists in jungles and bases in Sri Lanka. The gameplay and user interface are heavily based on that of the Xbox 360 version of Ghost Recon Advanced Warfighter and the console versions of Ghost Recon Advanced Warfighter 2, being a third-person cover-based shooter with a focus on tactical squad orders. Unlike Ghost Recon 2 or Ghost Recon: Advanced Warfighter, the player is able to dynamically switch between control of all three of their Ghost squad mates, instead of only controlling a single main character.

== Plot ==
During political instability in Sri Lanka, American mining vessel crews off the coast are massacred by unknown assailants, prompting the United States to deploy a Ghost team led by Colonel Scott Mitchell to investigate. In Sri Lanka, the Ghosts are assisted by Mister Hisan and the Mumpuri Guard, a non-political militia formed to protect the civilian population from various armed factions that are fighting for control of the country.

The Ghosts receive intelligence from the CIA identifying one of the armed groups, the People's Action Front (also known as the Activists), as being responsible for the massacre of the American ship crews. The Ghosts take out several Activist bases and eventually assassinate their leader, "the Teacher", but they are ambushed by the Loyalists, a paramilitary faction. After being rescued by the Mumpuri Guard, the Ghosts engage in activities against the Loyalists, including rescuing Colonel Mitchell after his helicopter is shot down by them.

The Ghosts eventually learn that the CIA's informant in Sri Lanka, Dilip Khan, is a member of the Loyalists and gave the U.S. false information implicating the Teacher in the attacks on U.S. ships. The attacks were actually conducted by the Loyalists as a false flag operation to trick the U.S. into assassinating the Teacher, so that the Loyalists could absorb the Activists and gain strength in the power struggle. The Ghosts capture Khan and force him to make a confession, causing the Activists and Loyalists to split and wage war against each other. Using the fighting as cover, the Ghosts infiltrate a Loyalist headquarters to rescue the President of Sri Lanka, who has been kidnapped by them. They also discover a Loyalist propaganda broadcast that reveals the leader of the Loyalists is Sunil Ranga, the Minister of Energy.

The Ghosts infiltrate Ranga's mansion estate, where Ranga is either killed or captured, bringing an end to the hostilities. They are thanked by Mister Hisan for their actions, and remind him that they were "never here".

== Reception ==
Reception

Aggregate scores
Aggregator	Score
GameRankings	56%
Metacritic	54/100

Review scores
Publication	Score
GamesRadar+	2.5/5
IGN	6/10
PlayStation Official Magazine – UK	5/10
Play	60%

The game was met with mixed reception upon release; GameRankings gave it a score of 56%, while Metacritic gave it 54 out of 100.
