= Politik =

Politik may also refer to:

- Politics (Swedish, German, Danish, Indonesian and Haitian Creole: Politik)
  - Realpolitik, politics or diplomacy based primarily on considerations of given circumstances and factors
- JHU Politik, a Johns Hopkins University student organization
- "Politik" (song), by Coldplay, 2001
- Politik, a political news website by New Zealand journalist Richard Harman

== See also ==
- Politika (disambiguation)
