= Classic trilogy =

Classic trilogy may refer to:

- The Oresteia
- Star Wars original trilogy
- Tom Clancy's Classic Trilogy
- Tom Clancy's Splinter Cell Classic Trilogy
