= Tom Clancy's Politika =

1997 video game

- Developer: Red Storm Entertainment
- Publisher: Red Storm Entertainment
- Composer: Bill Brown
- Series: Tom Clancy's
- Platforms: Microsoft Windows, Macintosh
- Release: NA: November 5, 1997
- Genre: Strategy
- Mode: Single-player Multiplayer

Tom Clancy's Politika is a Risk-like game for the PC and Macintosh made by Red Storm Entertainment based on the Tom Clancy's Power Plays novel Politika. It was released on November 5th, 1997.

== Gameplay ==
Tom Clancy’s Politika is a turn-based strategy game for 1 to 8 players, adapting a board game format set in post‑Yeltsin Russia. Players can choose one of eight political factions, such as the KGB, Communists, Church, Military, Mafia, Nationalists, Reformers, or Separatists, each with a unique special ability (the KGB can steal a card; Mafia can extort money; Separatists earn double income in their regions). The game is played on a map of Russia divided into regions. Each region has three control slots; players place or move influence tokens and representative markers (workers, students, demonstrators) during their turn. Income is generated from controlled regions, calculated at the start of each round based on the number of occupied slots.

Each turn consists of several phases:

1. Income – Players collect money based on regional control.
2. Movement – Representatives and uprising tokens can be deployed or repositioned.
3. Conflict – Players may initiate challenges in contested regions: spend money to buy dice, roll against opponents, and apply card-based modifiers.
4. Card Purchase – Money can be spent to acquire action cards for tactical use, including attack enhancements and regional effects.

The game varies each round and initiates once everyone has taken a turn . At the end, victory points are awarded for region control and unspent funds; a tie results in a “collapse of Russia”, no winner declared. The single-player mode features basic AI, however, it is widely criticized for being too weak and predictable, making the campaign unchallenging, In other case, multiplayer, including cooperative alliances, deception, eavesdropping via private messages, bargaining, and betrayals, offers a dynamic and strategically rich environment.

== Plot ==
The year is 1999. Tom Clancy's Politika begins with the sudden, unexplained death of Russia’s president Boris Yeltsin, plunging the nation into political chaos. A devastating crop failure exacerbates the crisis, triggering widespread famine and heightening yet the threat of revolution.

In an effort to stabilize the situation, one of the members of Russia’s provisional government secretly asks the U.S. president for humanitarian aid. However, international concerns intensify when a terrorist bombing in the United States results in major casualties and the evidence appears to implicate a new Russian leadership.

Amidst growing diplomatic tensions, American billionaire Roger Gordian, the head of a global corporation, finds his business and employees endangered as he's determined to uncover the perpetrators, Gordian mobilizes his private crisis-management team.

The narrative accelerates as Gordian’s investigation leads him across the globe, from Moscow’s power corridors to New York City’s ruined streets, and even into the harsh landscapes of a Turkish desert, which it reveals a deep and transnational conspiracy.

As Gordian digs deeper, he discovers that the terrorists are planning even larger and more destructive attacks. With the stakes escalating and USA–Russia relations on the brink of collapse, Gordian must race against time to thwart the plot and clear Russia’s name, while grappling with how much he's willing to sacrifice.

== Reception ==
Reception

Review scores
Publication	Score
GameSpot	4.5
PC Gamer	40%

William R. Trotter reviewed Tom Clancy's Politika on PC Gamer and he gave 40%, stating the game is "modestly entertaining" and it is "disappointment in almost every respect."

Dean Gordon from Games Domain Review, said that the game is a "Hardly gripping stuff." and criticized the resolution. While he criticized Tom Clancy's Politika's merits as a videogame, Dean stated that Tom Clancy's Politika is a "great buy and a viable alternative" to board games like Risk and Diplomacy.
