= Force 21 (video game) =

1999 video game

- Developers: Red Storm Entertainment (PC); The Code Monkeys (GBC)
- Publisher: Red Storm Entertainment
- Platforms: Microsoft Windows, Game Boy Color
- Release: Windows: NA: August 12, 1999; EU: 1999; Game Boy Color: NA: December 22, 2000
- Genre: Real-time strategy
- Modes: Single-player, multiplayer

Force 21 is a real-time strategy game made by Red Storm Entertainment.

== Plot summary ==
The game features a storyline which has US forces fighting PRC forces in the year 2015.

== Development and release ==
Force 21 was released in 1999 for Microsoft Windows, and in December 2000 for Game Boy Color. General Franks (who later collaborated with Tom Clancy on a book) consulted for this game.

== Reception ==
Reception

Aggregate score
| Aggregator | Score |
|---|---|
| GameRankings | 65% |

Review scores
| Publication | Score |
|---|---|
| AllGame | 3/5 |
| CNET Gamecenter | 7/10 |
| Computer Games Strategy Plus | 2/5 |
| Computer Gaming World | 1.5/5 |
| Electronic Gaming Monthly | (GBC) 4/10 |
| GameSpot | 6.7/10 |
| GameZone | 7/10 |
| IGN | 7.8/10 |
| Nintendo Power | (GBC) 6.1/10 |
| PC Accelerator | 6/10 |
| PC Gamer (US) | 90% |

The PC version received mixed reviews according to the review aggregation website GameRankings. It sold 9,168 units in the U.S. by April 2000.
