= Shadow Watch =

2000 video game

- Developer: Red Storm Entertainment
- Publisher: Red Storm Entertainment
- Designer: Kevin Perry
- Composer: Bill Brown
- Platform: Microsoft Windows
- Release: NA: April 13, 2000; EU: April 18, 2000; UK: 2001
- Genres: Tactical role-playing, turn-based tactics
- Mode: Single-player

Shadow Watch is a video game developed by Red Storm Entertainment and released for Microsoft Windows in 2000.

== Gameplay ==
It is a turn-based tactics game in which the player fights a conspiracy to halt construction of an international space station. It is based on the Tom Clancy's Power Plays novel Shadow Watch.

The player's team consists of six operatives, each of which has a specialist skill. These abilities can be upgraded and characters learn moves after enough experience points are earned.

Missions are somewhat randomised, and often the story mode will branch out into several paths. Most missions involve killing all of the enemies, but other missions include stealing a package, retrieving a hostage, defending a location. Missions typically have a difficulty and alarm rating, some missions will automatically fail if the alarm is sounded.

In a mission, characters have a certain number of action points (APs). Most actions (shooting weapons, opening doors) cost 1 AP, whereas some moves can consume more. Characters can get injured, and a severe injury will automatically fail the mission.

The music for the game was composed by Bill Brown.

== Reception ==
Reception

Aggregate score
Aggregator	Score
GameRankings	62%

Review scores
Publication	Score
CNET Gamecenter	5/10
Computer Games Strategy Plus	2.5/5
Computer Gaming World	2.5/5
EP Daily	9/10
GameFan	70%
GameSpot	7/10
GameSpy	54%
GameZone	7/10
IGN	8.4/10
Next Generation	1/5
PC Accelerator	5/10
PC Gamer (US)	71%

The game received mixed reviews according to the review aggregation website GameRankings. Christian A. O'Brien of NextGen said in an early review, "Unless you want to trudge through medieval technology and game play, pass right on by Shadow Watch. It belongs in the history books." GamePro said that the game was "perfect for a quick mission, with none of the elaborate notes you have to employ for tracking inventory, research, and travels in larger, more complex turn-based tactical games." (Note: GamePro gave the game 2.5/5 for graphics, 3/5 for sound, 4/5 for control, and 3.5/5 for fun factor.)
