= Red Storm Entertainment =

American video game developer

Red Storm Entertainment, Inc.
- Type: Subsidiary
- Industry: Video games
- Founded: November 13, 1996; 29 years ago
- Founders: Tom Clancy; Doug Littlejohns
- Headquarters: Cary, North Carolina, US
- Key people: Elizabeth Loverso (managing director)
- Number of employees: 180 (2022)
- Parent: Ubisoft (2000–present)
- Website: redstorm.com

Red Storm Entertainment, Inc. is an American video game developer and studio of Ubisoft based in Cary, North Carolina. Founded in November 1996 between author Tom Clancy, manager Doug Littlejohns, and software development company Virtus Corporation, Red Storm develops games in the Tom Clancy's franchise. Ubisoft (then known as Ubi Soft) acquired the studio in August 2000.

== History ==
Prior to founding Red Storm Entertainment, Tom Clancy, an American novelist, had developed Tom Clancy's SSN, a video game based on his book SSN. The game was created over six years in cooperation with Virtus Corporation, a 3D animation tool development company based in Cary, North Carolina, and its game development division, Virtus Studios. Tom Clancy's SSN was released on November 12, 1996, and on the following day, Clancy and Virtus Corporation announced the formation of Red Storm Entertainment. The name was derived from that of Clancy's book Red Storm Rising. The new company absorbed Virtus Studios, making for an initial staff count of nineteen. Red Storm moved into offices within Cary, with Clancy assuming the role of chairman, while Doug Littlejohns (a retired commodore in the Royal Navy who had previously acted as a technical consultant on Tom Clancy's SSN) became Red Storm's president and chief executive officer. The company expanded from nineteen to thirty-two people by March 1, 1997, in the wake of which it moved to new offices on Aerial Center (close to the Raleigh–Durham International Airport) in Morrisville.

The company released its first game – Tom Clancy's Politika, the first in the Power Plays series – in 1997. Red Storm quickly gained a reputation with games like Dominant Species, one of the first 3D real-time strategy games. However, it was with Rainbow Six (1998) that the company firmly established itself commercially. In contrast to the run-and-gun first-person shooters (FPS) that had gone before, Rainbow Six was the first true tactical FPS, a game that rewarded patience and planning as well as good aim and a keen eye. Developed alongside the novel of the same name, Rainbow Six introduced terms like "one shot, one kill" and "tango down" into the gamer lexicon. Its ground-breaking multiplayer action, including a new form of cooperative gameplay, set the standard for tactical multiplayer.

Red Storm followed on the success of Rainbow Six with a mission pack, Eagle Watch, and then in 2000 with a sequel, Rainbow Six: Rogue Spear. The company also expanded into turn-based strategy (ruthless.com and Shadow Watch) and military real-time strategy game (Force 21). In August 2000, Ubisoft purchased the studio. At the time of the sale, Red Storm was already producing Ghost Recon.

Released in 2001, Ghost Recon won multiple "Game of the Year" awards. The Xbox version also marked the first time Red Storm Entertainment ventured into in-house console development and was the first Xbox Live title to take advantage of the possibilities of console multiplayer. Follow-up add-ons like Island Thunder continued to expand the world of the Ghosts, while Red Storm itself grew and moved offices to a new location in Morrisville, North Carolina. By 2003, Ubisoft was ready to consolidate its North Carolina operations. Ubisoft's other area studio, Sinister Games in downtown Raleigh, was integrated into Red Storm, with the central base of operations remaining at the Morrisville location.

In 2004, Red Storm released Ghost Recon 2, the follow-up to the original game, designed by now lead designer Christian Allen. Released on Xbox, it signaled the company's transition to primarily console development. It produced an add-on, Summit Strike, in 2005, as well as downloadable content. Red Storm has also developed the multiplayer aspects of both iterations of the Ghost Recon Advanced Warfighter series. It won the BAFTA's Game of the Year and Best Technical Achievement awards in 2006.

In December 2008, Red Storm acquired the lease for the CentreGreen One building in Cary, which had previously been occupied by Qualcomm until earlier that year. Red Storm subsequently moved to CentreGreen One in May 2009, relocating from its previous offices on Gateway Centre in Morrisville.

Red Storm continued development on Tom Clancy games such as Ghost Recon: Future Soldier (2012) and The Division (2016), while co-operating with Ubisoft Montreal on the Far Cry franchise.

In 2016, Red Storm released their first virtual reality (VR) game, Werewolves Within, followed by a May 2017 release of another, Star Trek: Bridge Crew.

In May 2018, Red Storm acquired the Weston Office Campus (located on Weston Parkway in Cary), which it planned to move to after renovations and co-occupy with Ubisoft's NCSA Customer Relationship Center.

In September 2020, Ubisoft announced that Red Storm was developing a VR game in the Tom Clancy's Splinter Cell series, but the game was cancelled in July 2022. In May 2021, it was announced that Red Storm was working on a free-to-play spinoff of The Division, called Tom Clancy's The Division Heartland. However, after multiple delays and public play testing, Ubisoft cancelled the game in May 2024. Ubisoft subsequently laid off 45 employees between the company's San Francisco and Cary offices in August.

Ubisoft, after announcing a major company reorganization and downsizing earlier in 2026, laid off 100 staff of Red Storm in March 2026, and said it was ending game development at the studio.

== Games developed ==
Year	Title	Platform(s)	Note(s)
1997	Tom Clancy's Politika	Microsoft Windows	—N/a
1998	Dominant Species	Microsoft Windows	—N/a
1998	Tom Clancy's ruthless.com	Microsoft Windows	—N/a
1998	Tom Clancy's Rainbow Six	Microsoft Windows, PlayStation, Nintendo 64	—N/a
1999	Aironauts	PlayStation	—N/a
1999	Rainbow Six: Eagle Watch	Microsoft Windows	Expansion pack for Tom Clancy's Rainbow Six
1999	Tom Clancy's Rainbow Six: Rogue Spear	Microsoft Windows, Sega Dreamcast, PlayStation	Co-developed with Ubisoft Milan
1999	Force 21	Microsoft Windows	—N/a
2000	Bang! Gunship Elite	Microsoft Windows, Sega Dreamcast	—N/a
2000	Rainbow Six: Rogue Spear: Urban Operations	Microsoft Windows	Expansion pack for Rainbow Six: Rogue Spear
2000	Rainbow Six: Rogue Spear: Covert Ops	Microsoft Windows	Expansion pack for Rainbow Six: Rogue Spear
2000	Shadow Watch	Microsoft Windows	—N/a
2000	Freedom: First Resistance	Microsoft Windows	—N/a
2001	Rainbow Six: Rogue Spear: Black Thorn	Microsoft Windows	Expansion pack for Rainbow Six: Rogue Spear
2001	Tom Clancy's Ghost Recon	Microsoft Windows, PlayStation 2, Xbox, GameCube	—N/a
2002	Ghost Recon: Desert Siege	Microsoft Windows, PlayStation 2, Xbox, GameCube	Expansion pack for Tom Clancy's Ghost Recon
2002	Ghost Recon: Island Thunder	Microsoft Windows, Xbox	Expansion pack for Tom Clancy's Ghost Recon
2002	The Sum of All Fears	Microsoft Windows, GameCube, Game Boy Advance	—N/a
2002	Tom Clancy's Rainbow Six: Lone Wolf	PlayStation	Co-developed with Rebellion Developments
2003	Tom Clancy's Rainbow Six 3: Raven Shield	Microsoft Windows	Co-developed with Ubisoft Milan and Ubisoft Montreal
2004	Tom Clancy's Ghost Recon: Jungle Storm	PlayStation 2	—N/a
2004	Tom Clancy's Ghost Recon 2	PlayStation 2, Xbox, GameCube	—N/a
2005	Tom Clancy's Rainbow Six: Lockdown	Microsoft Windows, GameCube, PlayStation 2, Xbox	—N/a
2005	Tom Clancy's Ghost Recon 2: Summit Strike	Xbox	—N/a
2005	Tom Clancy's Rainbow Six 3: Raven Shield: Athena Sword	Microsoft Windows	Co-developed with Ubisoft Milan and Ubisoft Montreal
2006	Tom Clancy's Ghost Recon Advanced Warfighter	Xbox 360	—N/a
2007	Tom Clancy's Ghost Recon Advanced Warfighter 2	PlayStation 3, Xbox 360	—N/a
2007	America's Army: True Soldiers	Xbox 360	—N/a
2008	Tom Clancy's Rainbow Six 3: Raven Shield: Iron Wrath	Microsoft Windows	Co-developed with Ubisoft Milan and Ubisoft Montreal
2012	Tom Clancy's Ghost Recon: Future Soldier	Microsoft Windows, PlayStation 3, Xbox 360	Co-developed with Ubisoft Paris
2016	Werewolves Within	PlayStation 4, Microsoft Windows	—N/a
2017	Star Trek: Bridge Crew	PlayStation 4, Microsoft Windows	—N/a
2023	Assassin's Creed Nexus VR	Meta Quest 2	
—N/a	Untitled Tom Clancy's Splinter Cell VR game	Oculus Quest	Cancelled in July 2022
—N/a	Tom Clancy's The Division Heartland	Microsoft Windows, PlayStation 4, PlayStation 5, Xbox One, Xbox Series X/S	Cancelled in May 2024
