= Bang! Gunship Elite =

2000 video game

- North American Dreamcast cover art
- Developer: RayLand
- Publisher: Red Storm Entertainment
- Platforms: Windows, Dreamcast
- Release: Windows: NA: July 19, 2000; Dreamcast: NA: December 22, 2000
- Genre: Space combat simulator
- Modes: Single-player, multiplayer

Bang! Gunship Elite is a space combat simulator developed by French studio RayLand was released for Windows and Dreamcast. It allows the player to fly a combat spacecraft in a fully 3D environment and fight enemies piloting similar craft to their own.

== Plot ==
The excitement begins when one accepts the controls behind a futuristic space fighter. The war has taken a turn for the worse and fighter pilots are few and scarce in the Twin Suns solar system. The Kha reserves have been drained, and the Alliance has nowhere to turn except to a rookie who must prematurely aid them in the war effort. Players will join this Gunship Elite in order to save the Alliance's crusade and ultimately defeat the Sektar and the bloodthirsty Morgoths. The missions will be complex and next to impossible given the circumstances. Pilots will have to fly solo, kamikaze style, without any tactical support in order to accomplish their mission.

== Reception ==
Reception

Aggregate score
Aggregator	Score	
Aggregator	Dreamcast	PC
Metacritic	61/100	68/100

Review scores
Publication	Score	
Publication	Dreamcast	PC
AllGame	3/5	N/A
CNET Gamecenter	N/A	7/10
Computer Games Strategy Plus	N/A	2.5/5
Computer Gaming World	N/A	2.5/5
Electronic Gaming Monthly	6/10	N/A
EP Daily	N/A	5.5/10
Game Informer	8/10	7/10
GameSpot	6.9/10	6.4/10
GameZone	N/A	8.5/10
IGN	7/10	7.9/10
Next Generation	3/5	3/5
PC Gamer (US)	N/A	50%
The Cincinnati Enquirer	N/A	3.5/5

The game received "mixed or average reviews" on both platforms according to the review aggregation website Metacritic. Jim Preston of NextGen gave both the PC and Dreamcast versions mixed reviews in two separate issues, first calling the former "A gorgeous but simplistic shooter that will give action fans a short yet fun ride" (#70, October 2000); and later saying that the latter "reminds us of the charm of manic shooters from yesteryear, but it also reminds us why we don't play those games anymore" (#74, February 2001).

John Marrin of GamePro said of the PC version, "Space sim veterans won't find much to challenge their dogfighting skills in Gunship, but the overall difficulty of the missions makes up for it somewhat. If you're up for a relatively mindless space shooter (not simulation), then Gunship should fit the bill nicely." (Note: GamePro gave the PC version 4.5/5 for graphics, two 3/5 scores for sound and fun factor, and 3.5/5 for control.) Later, Four-Eyed Dragon said of the Dreamcast version, "All told, Starlancer is still the premier Dreamcast star fighter, yet, if you crave a simple bang for your buck in outer space without any engaging story or strategy, Bang should be your choice." (Note: GamePro gave the Dreamcast version two 4.5/5 scores for graphics and control, 3/5 for sound, and 3.5/5 for fun factor.)
