= America's Army: True Soldiers =

2007 video game

- Cover art
- Developer: Red Storm Entertainment
- Publisher: Ubisoft
- Producers: Randy Greenback; Stuart White
- Platform: Xbox 360
- Release: NA: November 15, 2007
- Genre: Tactical shooter
- Modes: Single-player, multiplayer

America's Army: True Soldiers is a first-person shooter video game developed by Red Storm Entertainment and published by Ubisoft. It was released on November 15, 2007. It is a spin-off of the United States Army's computer game America's Army.

== Gameplay ==
According to a preview of the game by IGN, players get an accuracy and damage resistance increase for sticking together with the rest of their fire squad. Players can only talk to and hear players that are near them. Team leaders can talk to each other by radio and can also call in artillery strikes. There are 5 classes: Rifleman, Grenadier, Sniper, Automatic Rifleman, and Squad Leader. In multiplayer, players' characters appear as U.S. soldiers while the opponents appear as non-U.S. soldiers. When players are shot they are kept on the ground and cannot be shot again unless they are healed by a teammate, as the game's aim is to portray a real war, and therefore players must reside within the rules of engagement. Multiplayer features scenarios, including reaching extraction points, defending objectives, and eliminating the enemy's VIP and simultaneously protecting their own.

The game features a token system, where players can give token points to each other for good deeds. In singleplayer, the players can choose out of several modes. Basic Training represents a series of tasks set on an outdoor firing range. Meanwhile, War Games consists of a series of checkpoints while firing at soldiers, who will sit down afterwards. There is an Extras section that acts as a recruiting promo, with parts about core values, soldier ranks, ammunition info, trivia and video profiles of the people who were connected to the Army.

== Development ==
True Soldiers uses an engine that also powered another game from Red Storm Entertainment, Tom Clancy's Ghost Recon Advanced Warfighter 2. The idea was to give more focus to multiplayer gaming, while not completely ignoring single-player experience at the same time. During the whole development, the team led by creative director Randy Greenback, had access to weapons used by United States Army. That resulted in creating textures that were as realistic as possible. All developers had a training at Fort McClellan, and were taught to fire and reload weapons. As a part of an agreement, Ubisoft assigned the project to Red Storm Entertainment. They wanted the game to represent an authentic experience by incorporating things based on soldier's values.

A playable demo has been released on the U.S. Xbox Live Marketplace on November 2, 2007, which allowed up to 16 players to either take part in a co-op mission, or a 8 vs 8 match.

== Reception ==
Reception

Aggregate score
Aggregator	Score
Metacritic	43/100

Review scores
Publication	Score
GameSpot	5/10
GamesRadar+	1.5/5
IGN	3.7/10
Official Xbox Magazine (US)	4.5/10
TeamXbox	4/10

The game received "unfavorable" reviews according to the review aggregation website Metacritic.
