= Tom Clancy's ruthless.com =

1998 video game

- Developer: Red Storm Entertainment
- Publisher: Red Storm Entertainment
- Designer: Kevin Perry
- Programmer: Scott Williams
- Artist: Doug Oglesby
- Platform: Microsoft Windows
- Release: November 20, 1998
- Genre: Turn-based strategy
- Modes: Single-player, multiplayer

Tom Clancy's ruthless.com is a turn-based strategy video game published in 1998 by Red Storm Entertainment. ruthless.com puts the player in the position of CEO of a new software company. The game features a campaign mode, six different scenarios of varying difficulty, and a multiplayer option. It later inspired a book of the same name in the Tom Clancy's Power Plays series.

== Overview ==
This is a game of economic intrigue and corporate maneuvering. As the new CEO of a software company, players must scheme and strategize, form and break alliances, undertake sometimes criminal actions and do whatever it takes to get the company to the top and keep it there.

Playing in a board-game-like environment, players can choose to play any of six individual scenarios or a full campaign. The scenarios each have fundamentally different parameters. Players at an advanced point in the action with opposing corporations already established and a small history already in place.

The campaign is more freeform and the player with only one building and three departments with no immediate opponents. While objectives vary for the scenarios, in the campaign game the player must control seventy-five percent of the market for four turns.

Setting up a game involves determining how long is it going to last — between 20, 40 or 60 turns. You also choose the level of AI you wish to play against, novice, intermediate or expert. Lastly, players can set their own difficulty level that indicates how far they can go into debt before losing (bankruptcy). On the easy setting, players can incur debt up to $10,000, medium $5,000 and hardest $2,500.

Other selections include naming the corporation and selecting a CEO. Each CEO has a unique benefit that he or she brings with labels like "Talented," "Whiz Kid" or "Banker." These benefits add, as examples, five percent per level to all computer points generated (Whiz Kid) or let you go twice as deep into debt before becoming bankrupt and losing the game (Banker).

Gameplay in Tom Clancy's ruthless.com is turn-based. Each turn, you give the CEO two orders, choosing from the Corporate, R&D, Marketing, Admin, Human Resources, Acquisitions, Legal, Security and Computer groups. Each group contains action orders such as "build new department" and "build new product" in the Corporate group, "executive training" in the Admin group and "assassinate executive" in the Security group.

At the end of each round, players get a comparative report that informs them on any newsworthy events such as how well (or how poorly) each company's stock prices are doing and any tragedies or executive promotions. As chosen executive(s) (you can hire more as the game progresses) gain experience, they're considered higher-level and sometimes gain additional traits (bonuses like the ones they start out with—as a Banker, Whiz Kid and so on).

Each round players attempt to acquire a larger portion of the market (represented by tiles on the game board). Doing this involves carrying out executive orders and negotiating to acquire the start-up companies that occasionally pop up around the game board.

== Gameplay ==
The game takes place on a map that represents the market share of all the competing companies. Each player in the game is a CEO of a software company. Legal, security, and computer attacks are common in the game. Competition comes from the fight over market shares (map squares). A CEO builds their initial buildings and puts their product into the market. Once on the market, a product's quality will determine its dominance in the market. Dominance in the market provides income to build additional buildings, bid for takeovers, or launch different kinds of attacks against the competitors.

== Reception ==
GameSpot reviewed the game in 1999, awarding 6.3 out of 10. Main criticisms included the shortness of the campaign, limited scenarios and lack of replayability. However, the multiplayer mode was deemed "about as much fun as turn-based multiplayer games can be". The graphics were also highlighted, with a well designed interface and inventive visuals.

In Game Revolution, the game was awarded a B+. The gameplay, multiplayer mode and interface were praised, while the main criticisms included the start difficult and the "poorly explained manual".

=== Reviews ===
- PC Gameworld - 85/100
- Game Revolution - B+
- GameGenie - 80/100
- GameSpot - 6.3/10
- Gamepower - 2,5/4
- Allgame.com - 3/5
- Gamecenter - 3/5
- IGN - 5.2/10
- Gamespot UK (Pre-2003) - 4/10
