= Dominant Species (video game) =

1998 video game

- Developer: Red Storm Entertainment
- Publisher: Red Storm Entertainment
- Platform: Windows
- Release: NA: October 15, 1998; EU: 1998
- Genre: Real-time strategy
- Modes: Single player, Multiplayer

Dominant Species is a real-time strategy video game developed and released by Red Storm Entertainment. It was published October 15, 1998 for Windows. It was one of the first RTS games to make the transition to 3D graphics.

== Storyline ==
Players in Dominant Species control a Mindlord on the planet Mur, in constant battle over the precious resource Anima. In the single player campaign, this battle is first against free roaming creatures, presenting a tutorial for the game. The campaign usually follows the player's hive rescuing and destroying the invading army of humans.

== Gameplay ==
Dominant Species is a traditional real-time strategy game, with resource gathering (anima), production of battlefield units (with a bio-engineered theme), a single-player campaign and multiplayer mode. There is an emphasis on efficient unit tactics rather than base construction.

== Reception ==
Reception

Review scores
Publication	Score
CNET Gamecenter	7/10
Computer Games Strategy Plus	4/5
Computer Gaming World	2/5
GamePro	3.5/5
Next Generation	2/5
PC Accelerator	2/10

The game received mixed reviews. Strategy Gaming Online found the game innovative and fun but with disappointing sound effects. Computer Games Strategy Plus drew comparisons with the Myth graphics engine, highlighting the aesthetically pleasing and strategic terrain, fluid movement of the units models and the game's humor and atmosphere. However, the artificial intelligence was criticized for the occasional quirk in pathfinding. On the other hand, Next Generation said, "If evolution is survival of the fittest, Red Storm's Dominant Species has fished itself out of the realtime strategy gene pool. While it is innovative in some ways, the end product isn't worth the trouble."
