= Bill Brown (composer) =

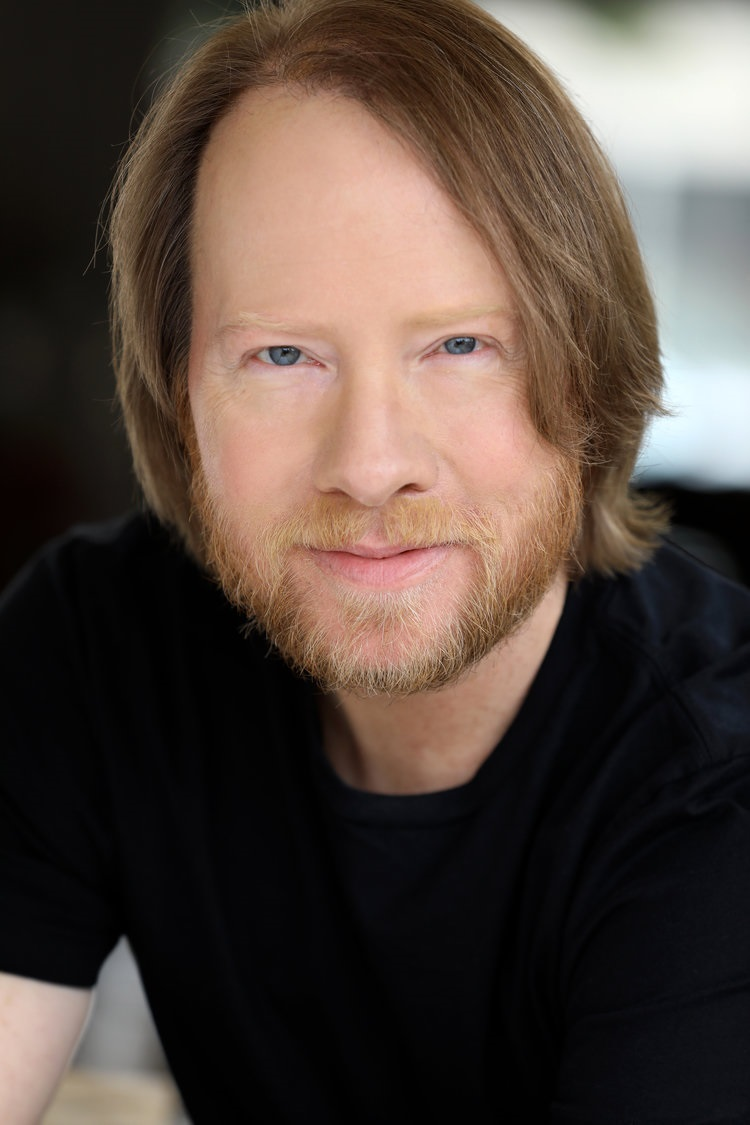

Background information
- Born: 1969 (age 56–57); San Diego, California, U.S.
- Genres: Orchestral
- Occupation: Composer
- Years active: 1997–present
- Website: http://www.billbrownmusic.com/

Bill Brown IV (born 1969) is an American composer of music for video games, films, and television productions. He is best known for creating the system sounds and tour software music for Microsoft's Windows XP operating system, as well as his work on the soundtracks of CSI: NY and several Quake, Rainbow Six, Ghost Recon, Command & Conquer, and Wolfenstein games in the 1990s and 2000s. His father was New York City radio disc jockey Bill Brown III (d. 2011).

== Filmography ==
=== Video games ===
- Quake II (1997)
- Trespasser (1998)
- Tom Clancy's Rainbow Six (1998)
- Tom Clancy's Rainbow Six: Rogue Spear (1999)
- Disney's Villains' Revenge (1999)
- Quake III (1999)
- Timeline (2000)
- Shadow Watch (2000)
- Return to Castle Wolfenstein (2001)
- Clive Barker's Undying (2001)
- Anachronox (2001)
- Tom Clancy's Ghost Recon (2001)
- Tom Clancy's Rainbow Six: Black Thorn (2001)
- The Sum of All Fears (2002)
- Tom Clancy's Ghost Recon: Island Thunder (2002)
- Tom Clancy's Ghost Recon 2 (2004) – theme co-written with Tom Salta
- Command & Conquer: Generals (2003)
- Command & Conquer: Generals Zero Hour (2003)
- Lineage II: The Chaotic Chronicle (2003) with Inon Zur
- Tom Clancy's Rainbow Six 3: Raven Shield (2003)
- Wolfenstein: Enemy Territory (2003)
- Tom Clancy's Ghost Recon: Jungle Storm (2004)
- Tom Clancy's Rainbow Six: Lockdown (2005)
- The Incredible Hulk: Ultimate Destruction (2005)
- Command & Conquer: The First Decade (2006) – compilation which included his work
- Tom Clancy's Rainbow Six: Critical Hour (2006)
- Enemy Territory: Quake Wars (2007)
- Wolfenstein (2009)
- Captain America: Super Soldier (2011)

=== Film ===
- War of the Angels (1999)
- Any Given Sunday (1999) (songs "Sharks' Theme", "Spiritual" and "Rock the Sharks")
- Ali (2001) (songs "Round 8 Strings" and "Prequel Strings")
- Behind Enemy Lines: The Making of Return to Castle Wolfenstein (2001)
- Scorcher (2002)
- Evil Deeds (2004)
- Lady Death (2004)
- The Devil's Tomb (2009)
- Rushlights (2013)
- Negative (2017)
- Duke (2019)
- Infamous (2020)
- Mending the Line (2023)

=== Television ===
- Trapped (2001, television film)
- CSI: NY (2004–2013)
- Whodunnit? (2013)

=== Other ===
- Windows XP (2001, operating system)
- Dreamstate (2018, concept album)

== Awards ==
- BMI 2005 TV Music Award for "CSI: NY" Season 1
- ITVA Golden Reel GOLD Award for Kennedy Space Center "Gateway to the Universe" soundtrack
- Music4Games – M4G Editor's Choice Award for "The Sum of All Fears" (PC)
- Best Music Award – PCXL Magazine's 1998 All-Star Awards for "Tom Clancy's Rainbow Six"

=== Nominations ===
- Game Audio Network Guild (G.A.N.G.) 2003 Awards Nominee for Lineage II: the Chaotic Chronicle (NCSoft), in the following categories: Best Live Performance Recording, Best Cinematic / Cut-Scene Audio, Best Original Vocal Song – Choral
- British Academy of Film and Television Arts (BAFTA) 2003 Games Awards Nominee in the Music category: Return to Castle Wolfenstein: Tides of War
- British Academy of Film and Television Arts (BAFTA) 2003 Games Awards Nominee in the Music category: Command and Conquer: Generals
- Golden Reel Nominee: Feature Film Ali (Columbia Pictures/Sony Pictures Entertainment)
- Golden Reel Nominee: Feature Film Any Given Sunday (Warner Bros.)
- British Academy of Film and Television Arts (BAFTA) 2001 Interactive Entertainment Award Nominee in the Music category: "Clive Barker's Undying"
- Best Original Music Nominee by L.A. Weekly: Blue Sphere Alliance's live theatrical production "Nagasaki Dust"
- Golden Reel Nominee: Hercules: The Legendary Journeys (Renaissance Pictures/Universal)
- Golden Reel Nominee: In the Presence of Mine Enemies (Showtime Pictures)
