= Tom Clancy's Ghost Recon 2 =

2004 video game

- Developer: Red Storm Entertainment
- Publisher: Ubisoft
- Designer: Christian Allen
- Composers: Bill Brown; Tom Salta
- Series: Tom Clancy's Ghost Recon
- Engine: Unreal Engine 2 (PS2)
- Platforms: Xbox, PlayStation 2, GameCube
- Release: Xbox, PS2: NA: November 16, 2004 (Xbox); AU: November 25, 2004; EU: November 26, 2004; NA: November 30, 2004 (PS2); GameCube: NA: March 15, 2005; EU: March 24, 2005
- Genre: Tactical shooter
- Modes: Single-player, multiplayer

Tom Clancy's Ghost Recon 2 is a tactical shooter video game developed by Red Storm Entertainment and published by Ubisoft for Xbox, PlayStation 2 and GameCube in 2004. It is a direct sequel to the 2001 video game Tom Clancy's Ghost Recon.

The game takes place on the Korean Peninsula, with slight variations between platforms. The GameCube and PS2 campaign occurs in 2007, while the Xbox campaign is set in 2011. Ghost Recon 2 sports an updated graphics engine, the Havok 2 physics engine, new multiplayer options, and voice command ability via microphone.

== Gameplay ==
In the single player campaign, the player assumes the role of Ghost Team leader, Captain Scott Mitchell; Mitchell is described as "a consummate soldier", being a veteran of several armed conflicts and can use weaponry from any soldier class, including assault rifles, carbines, submachine guns, sniper rifles and more. In several missions the player is inserted alone and must complete the mission without assistance from the other Ghosts. Such missions render assistance in the form of air strikes the player can call in.

=== Multiplayer ===
There are several variations of multiplayer mode in Ghost Recon 2. Co-operative games are available in the campaign mission, battle, defend, firefight, garrison, recon, and scout modes, in which players must work together to accomplish a single goal. Garrison mode, for example, is when players must keep enemy troops out of a marked area, for a designated time.

Adversarial modes are divided into two categories; Solo, where players work separately, usually against one another, and Squad, where players are divided up into opposing teams.

== Plot ==
Like Tom Clancy's Rainbow Six 3: Raven Shield, the plot of Ghost Recon 2 differs between releases. The PlayStation 2 and GameCube versions have entirely different plots from that of the Xbox version, with the latter serving as a sequel to the former. The plot is also peripherally connected to that of Splinter Cell: Chaos Theory.

=== PlayStation 2/GameCube (2007: First Contact) ===
In July 2007, North Korea is devastated by a nationwide famine that forces the government to redirect much of the military budget to relief programs and civic projects. The reappropriation angers the Korean People's Army command, especially General Jung Chong-sun, who launches a coup d'état and places the military on high alert across the DMZ. When a North Korean Super-Silkworm missile sinks the U.S. Navy intelligence-gathering vessel USS Clarence E. Walsh (CG-80), supposedly by accident, the United States deploys covert forces, including the U.S. Army's "Ghosts" special forces unit and the National Security Agency's Third Echelon, to defuse the situation in North Korea and determine the nature of the attack.

The Ghosts deploy to North Korea and conduct operations to defeat the coup forces and prevent a reignited Korean War, eventually succeeding after foiling Jung's plan to demolish a dam and flood the DMZ, while Third Echelon uncovers the truth about the sinking. Having inflicted sufficient damage, the coup forces back down and American forces withdraw. However, four months later, one of Jung's subordinates, General Paik, activates a Taepodong-2 MIRV nuclear missile and targets South Korea, the United States, and NATO. The Ghosts redeploy to North Korea to prevent the launch and destroy the missile. With their plans in disarray, Paik commits suicide while Jung plots revenge.

=== Xbox (2011: Final Assault) ===
In 2011, North Korea has recovered from the initial conflict in 2007. Emboldened and still seeking revenge, Jung launches another coup to overthrow the North Korean government and prepares to spark a greater Korean War involving all of Asia by targeting Asian and Western countries with North Korea's nuclear arsenal. In response, the U.S., NATO, and Australia deploy a peacekeeping force to the region alongside the Ghosts to counter the North Korean threat.

The Ghosts deploy to North Korea and launch another successful campaign against North Korea, whittling their combat capabilities and supply lines. Faced with dwindling supplies and growing dissent among the populace, Jung becomes increasingly desperate to retain control and attempts to crush dissent by force, eventually culminating in an attempt to destroy his own rebellious cities using nuclear warheads hidden in trains that is foiled when the Ghosts intercept them.

Now out of options, Jung leads the capture of a dam near Hamhung with a nuclear warhead, planning a repeat of his attempted flooding attack from 2007. The Ghosts attack once more to disable the warhead and kill Jung, preventing the escalation of the Korean conflict.

== Development ==
Production for Tom Clancy's Ghost Recon 2 started in September 2002 and was wrapped up in October 2004. The PS2/GameCube version uses the Unreal Engine 2, while the Xbox version relies on a modified version of the original engine used by Red Storm Entertainment. Due to hardware differences, the PS2/GameCube version features more modest graphics, simpler level design, and generally a less ambitious scope compared to the Xbox version. Though, it retains a full single-player campaign and supports up to 16-player online multiplayer. Xbox version benefits from more advanced graphics, larger maps, enhanced environmental detail, and more robust multiplayer and tactical options, leveraging the more powerful hardware and development resources of Red Storm.

This staggered release, along with the dual-game development, reflects a strategy by the publisher, Ubisoft, to tailor the experience to each platform’s strengths, while reaching different segments of the console gaming market. Because of this separation, the two versions do not share identical plots or missions; each offers a self-contained campaign tied to its own version’s timeline and narrative arc.

A Microsoft Windows version of Ghost Recon 2 was planned but cancelled in April 2005 in favor of Tom Clancy's Ghost Recon Advanced Warfighter.

== Expansion packs ==
=== Summit Strike ===
Tom Clancy's Ghost Recon 2: Summit Strike is a standalone expansion pack for Ghost Recon 2 available exclusively on the Xbox. It includes 11 new single-player missions, as well as new weapons (such as the FN SCAR) and an expanded multiplayer game. It was released on August 2, 2005.

== Reception ==
Reception

Aggregate scores
Aggregator	Score
GameRankings	(Xbox) 82.67% (PS2) 63.34% (GC) 48.67%
Metacritic	(Xbox) 80/100 (PS2) 58/100 (GC) 54/100

Review scores
Publication	Score
Edge	7/10
Electronic Gaming Monthly	(Xbox) 6.33/10 (PS2) 3.67/10
Eurogamer	8/10
Game Informer	(Xbox) 8/10 (PS2) 6.5/10
GamePro	3.5/5
GameRevolution	B−
GameSpot	(Xbox) 8.5/10; 5.3/10
GameSpy	(Xbox) 4.5/5 (PS2) 3/5
GameZone	(Xbox) 9/10 (PS2) 6.2/10 (GC) 4.5/10
IGN	(Xbox) 8.8/10; 6/10
Nintendo Power	2.7/5
Official U.S. PlayStation Magazine	3/5
Official Xbox Magazine (US)	9/10
Cube	(NGC) 5.9/10
Detroit Free Press	3/4
The Sydney Morning Herald	(Xbox) 4/5 (PS2) 2.5/5

By the end of 2004, after seven weeks of availability, Ghost Recon 2 had sold 1.4 million copies.

Ghost Recon 2 was met with positive (Xbox) to very mixed reception (PS2 and GameCube). GameRankings and Metacritic gave it a score of 82.67% and 80 out of 100 for the Xbox version; 63.34% and 58 out of 100 for the PlayStation 2 version; and 48.67% and 54 out of 100 for the GameCube version.

The game was criticized by the North Korean government for its storyline.
