= Tom Clancy's Rainbow Six (video game) =

1998 video game

- Developers: Red Storm Entertainment (Note: Ported to Mac OS by Varcon Systems); Saffire (N64); Rebellion Developments (PS); Crawfish Interactive (GBC); Pipe Dream Interactive (DC)
- Publishers: Red Storm Entertainment: NA: Red Storm Entertainment (Note: Distributed in North America by SouthPeak Games) (Note: Mac OS version published by Macsoft); EU: Take-Two Interactive; Dreamcast; NA: Majesco (Note: Published under Majesco's Pipe Dream Interactive label); EU: Swing! Entertainment
- Producer: Carl Schnurr
- Designers: Brian Upton; Carl Schnurr
- Programmers: Brian Upton; Peter McMurry
- Artist: Jonathan Peedin
- Writer: Tom Clancy
- Composer: Bill Brown
- Series: Tom Clancy's Rainbow Six
- Platforms: Windows, Nintendo 64, PlayStation, Mac OS, Game Boy Color, Dreamcast
- Release: August 21, 1998: Windows; NA: August 21, 1998; UK: October 23, 1998; Nintendo 64; NA: November 17, 1999; UK: December 10, 1999; PlayStation; UK: November 19, 1999; NA: November 23, 1999; Mac OS; NA: December 1, 1999; Game Boy Color; NA: April 12, 2000; UK: November 10, 2000; Dreamcast; NA: May 3, 2000; UK: February 2, 2001
- Genre: Tactical shooter
- Modes: Single-player, multiplayer

Tom Clancy's Rainbow Six is a 1998 tactical shooter video game developed and published by Red Storm Entertainment for Microsoft Windows, with later ports for the Nintendo 64, PlayStation, Mac OS, Game Boy Color, and Dreamcast. It is the first installment in the Rainbow Six series. Based on the Tom Clancy novel of the same name, the game follows Rainbow, a top secret international counterterrorist organization, and the conspiracy they unravel as they handle a seemingly random spike in terrorism.

In singleplayer, the player advances through a series of missions in a campaign. Before each mission, the player is briefed on the situation, selects and organizes their operatives and equipment, and plans their movement through the level; during missions, the player controls an operative leading computer-controlled teammates as they follow the player's plan. In multiplayer, players cooperate in player-versus-environment missions or battle to complete objectives in player-versus-player matches. The game features realistic gameplay factors, weapon lethality, and consequences for failure, forcing players to plan their approach carefully and promoting replayability for more streamlined completion.

Rainbow Six began as a concept by Red Storm following their formation in 1996. The game was developed in parallel with the Rainbow Six novel, with a design philosophy of realism and strategy guiding all aspects of development; however, numerous setbacks stymied the game's development and forced the developers to crunch. Though his name is in the game's title, Tom Clancy's involvement in Rainbow Six's development was very minimal. Red Storm developed the PC version, while all other ports were developed by their respective companies.

Rainbow Six was released on August 21, 1998 to widespread critical acclaim, though the console ports received relatively lower ratings than the PC version. For most releases, praise was directed toward gameplay, multiplayer, immersion, and the game's combination of strategy and action, while criticism mainly centered on AI issues, glitches, and the graphics and controls of some ports. The game sold over 200,000 copies in its first year of release and maintained high sales figures into the early 2000s. Rainbow Six was nominated for numerous accolades and has been deemed one of the best video games of 1998. It is considered a milestone in the history of first-person shooters and made a lasting impact on the then-fledgling tactical shooter genre.

An expansion pack, Tom Clancy's Rainbow Six Mission Pack: Eagle Watch, was released on January 26, 1999. A sequel, Tom Clancy's Rainbow Six: Rogue Spear, was released in 1999. A loose mobile game remake, Tom Clancy's Rainbow Six: Shadow Vanguard, was released in 2011.

== Gameplay ==
A screenshot from the PC version depicting AI-controlled teammates moving into position during a mission

Rainbow Six is a tactical shooter, in which characters are affected by realistic factors and can be killed with a single bullet; therefore, wise tactics and planning are encouraged to complete missions over sheer force and firepower.

The game follows a campaign of several missions, with the plot being advanced in the mission briefing of each. Missions in each version differ: the PC and Game Boy Color versions have 16 missions, the Nintendo 64 port has 12 missions, the PlayStation port has 14 missions and the Dreamcast port has 21 missions. Objectives in missions include defeating enemies, rescuing hostages, defusing bombs, gathering intelligence, and planting surveillance devices. Players are encouraged to find their own ways to complete objectives using a variety of tactics and methods, ranging from stealthy infiltration to a frontal assault (except in missions where stealth is mandatory). Successful missions often last just minutes, but may require dozens of repetitions and planning changes to account for failures, new plans, or simply faster or cleaner completion.

Before each mission is a planning stage, in which the player is briefed on the situation, chooses the Rainbow operatives to be involved in the mission, organizes them into color-coded teams, and selects their weapons, equipment, and uniforms. Operatives are categorized into five classes based on their skill specializations: Assault, Demolitions, Electronics, Recon, and Sniper. The vast majority of operatives are named characters with their own backstories and skillsets, but generic "reserves" are also available for each class should players wish to avoid risking named operatives, although they have greatly reduced skills. In the planning stage, the player is shown a map of the area of operations to set team orders, such as AI pathing, team "go" codes to hold until ordered, where AI operatives will deploy equipment such as flashbangs or door breaching charges, and rules of engagement; alternatively, the player can skip this by choosing to follow a preset plan instead.

During gameplay, the player directly controls a team leader, and can use their weapons and equipment, manually lead their team, and see stats for the controlled operative and their team on the HUD. The player can take control of any alive team leader at will. Operatives and teams not under player control follow the orders given to them in the planning stage. Injured or fatigued operatives require time off after a mission to recover (they can still be used, just with lower health or reduced skills), while deceased operatives are permanently lost and cannot be used for the rest of the campaign playthrough, forcing players to plan carefully to avoid casualties.

Online multiplayer for the PC version was available on the MPlayer.com and Zone.com services. Multiplayer modes include cooperative modes, deathmatch, and team deathmatch, among others. Most other console ports lack multiplayer, though the Nintendo 64 port includes a two-player split-screen cooperative mode.

Most versions of Rainbow Six have considerable differences. The PlayStation port was developed by Rebellion and features visible weapons in first person, entirely new mission layouts, and a smaller team size (4, opposed to 8 in other versions). The Nintendo 64 port has a simpler HUD design and completely reorganized missions, including some from Eagle Watch. The Game Boy Color port is the most notable example, having radically different gameplay and presentation due to the platform's technical limitations: gameplay is slowed and simplified, crossfire is removed, and the 3D graphics from other releases are replaced by a 2.5D top-down perspective.

== Plot ==
In 1999, in response to a post-Cold War rise in terrorism, the world's special forces units, police tactical units, and intelligence agencies form "Rainbow", a covert international counterterrorist organization led by John Clark.

In 2000, Rainbow responds to a series of terrorist attacks linked to the Phoenix Group eco-terrorist organization. Rainbow's operations against Phoenix are assisted by John Brightling, chairman of the powerful biotechnology corporation Horizon Inc., whose facilities are frequently targeted by Phoenix; Anne Lang, the Science Advisor to the President of the United States and an acquaintance of Brightling; and Catherine Winston, a biological expert working with Horizon who is rescued by Rainbow following an attack on a Horizon facility in Africa.

After a raid on a Phoenix compound in Idaho that reveals unethical human experimentation, Rainbow learns the Phoenix Group is a front for Horizon. Viewing humanity as an environmentally destructive "disease", Brightling plans to exterminate most of humanity using a highly contagious manmade strain of the Ebola virus called "Brahma", sparing only his chosen few (including Lang), who will rebuild Earth into a scientific environmental utopia. To achieve this, Brightling has engineered terrorist attacks to exploit heightened terrorism concerns and secure a contract for his private security firm Global Security at the 2000 Summer Olympics in Sydney. Global Security's personnel, led by William Hendrickson, will then release Brahma at the Olympics through Stadium Australia's cooling system, spreading the virus worldwide when the athletes and spectators return home.

After gathering intelligence and rescuing Winston from a last-ditch attempt to silence her, Rainbow apprehends Lang and Hendrickson and prevents Brahma's release at the Olympic Village, foiling Brightling's plans. Brightling and his collaborators flee to their Horizon Ark facility in the Amazon rainforest, where they planned to weather out the Brahma pandemic. Rainbow assaults the Ark, neutralizes Brightling's collaborators, and takes Brightling into custody.

== Development ==
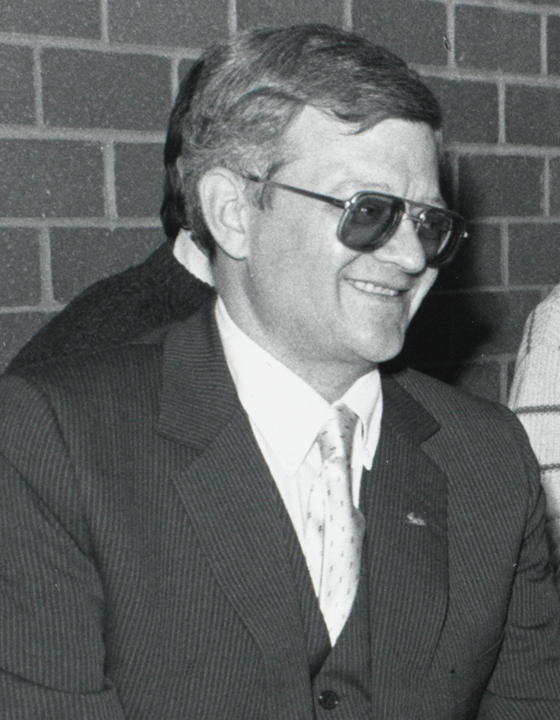
Tom Clancy (pictured here in 1989) conceptualized Rainbow Six and co-founded Red Storm Entertainment, but had minimal involvement in the game's development.

The idea of the game that would become Rainbow Six originated from early concepts Red Storm Entertainment had conceived following the company's formation in 1996. Selected from around 100 other ideas, the original concept, titled HRT, followed the FBI Hostage Rescue Team rescuing hostages from criminals and terrorists. HRT was gradually expanded in scope with the addition of covert operations and an international setting, and the game was rechristened Black Ops. With the initial FBI HRT concept dropped and gameplay branching away from just hostage rescue, multiple alternate settings were proposed for Black Ops—including World War II, 1960s spy fiction-esque Cold War espionage, the near future, and a dystopian antihero-centered story called Jackbooted Thugs—before finally settling on contemporary counterterrorism. Red Storm CEO Doug Littlejohns, a former Royal Navy submarine commander and a close friend of Tom Clancy, did not want to develop an arcade shooter with "mindless violence", but also did not want a "boring" slow-paced strategy game, so Black Ops was designed to focus on realism and action, with a strong emphasis on planning and strategy. Lead game designer Brian Upton, recalling Rainbow Six's development process in the May 1999 issue of Game Developer, described the game's design philosophy from the initial concept:

We knew from the start that we wanted to capture the excitement of movies such as Mission: Impossible and The Dirty Dozen—the thrill of watching a team of skilled specialists pull off an operation with clockwork precision. We also knew that we wanted it to be an action game with a strong strategic component—a realistic shooter that would be fun to play even without a Quake player's twitch reflexes.

Rainbow Six—both the game and the novel—originated from a discussion between Littlejohns and Clancy during a Red Storm company outing in 1996, when Littlejohns mentioned Black Ops. When Clancy mentioned that he was writing his own novel about a hostage rescue unit, their conversation led to Littlejohns noting the protracted diplomatic delays in authorizing a foreign counterterrorist unit's deployment overseas, and he suggested the formation of a permanent counterterrorist unit that already had authorization to deploy internationally. The name "Rainbow" came from the term "Rainbow nation", coined by Desmond Tutu to describe post-apartheid South Africa under Nelson Mandela's presidency. "Six" came from the American rank code for captain (O-6); though John Clark would more accurately be described as a major general (O-8), "Rainbow Six" read better than "Rainbow Eight". Upton objected to the addition of "Six", believing having a number at the end of the title would affect a potential sequel, but he was overruled.

Following the game's development doctrine of realism, lead level designer John Sonedecker designed each level to be as accurate and realistic to real-world architecture as possible, noting that the presence of unusual design elements seen in other less-realistic shooters, such as unnecessarily large doorways or building layouts seemingly designed for combat, would ruin the player's immersion and affect gameplay. The development team had access to counterterrorism experts, military trainers, and technical consultants, and used their advice to ensure authenticity and streamline development by cutting mechanics deemed unrealistic or unnecessary, such as jumping. These technical advisors also provided motion capture for character animations.

By 1997, the game was very behind on schedule, and the developers began to crunch. Many developers slept in a spare room of the office, Upton's mental health deteriorated to the point that he had a nervous breakdown that prompted company restructuring to reduce his workload, and network programmer Dave Weinstein (hired as part of the aforementioned company restructuring) was once stopped by police on suspicion of driving under the influence due to his severe exhaustion from crunch. Clancy's involvement in development was "minimal", only sending Red Storm an early manuscript of the novel to work plot details into the game (hence why the game's plot features different characters and a slightly different storyline). Clancy would insist the developers add features his experts claimed were realistic, such as the fictional heartbeat sensor used in the novel that functions as a radar-like equipment item in-game. In November 1997, the developers realized the game was becoming too demanding, only having single-digit frame rates on high-end devices, so a massive two-month overhaul was ordered. Despite these setbacks, development managed to progress relatively smoothly overall, and a gameplay demonstration at E3 1998 that unintentionally displayed AI teammates rescuing hostages by themselves boosted the game's publicity ahead of release.

Several weeks prior to the game's release on PC, early copies of the game were leaked onto online piracy websites. The users that uploaded the game files reportedly "took credit for 'cracking' a game with no copy protection in it", frustrating the developers; Weinstein recalled going on a profanity-laden rant on the topic in Red Storm's office, only to be pulled aside by Littlejohns for his volume, having been heard three offices away.

The Nintendo 64, PlayStation, Mac OS, Game Boy Color, and Dreamcast releases of the game were each developed by separate companies: Saffire for the N64, Rebellion Developments for the PS1, Varcon Systems for Mac OS, Crawfish Interactive for the GBC, and Pipe Dream Interactive for the Dreamcast. Saffire struggled to simplify Rainbow Six's control scheme to suit the Nintendo 64 controller and ultimately had to completely remake the game so it would be able to run without frame rate dips on the N64. Crawfish opted to give the Game Boy Color port a unique game style, as they felt other game styles would not suit Rainbow Six's gameplay and features on the platform. The release of Pipe Dream's Dreamcast port was delayed by eight months.

The game's box art, featuring a Rainbow operative armed with a Heckler & Koch USP, was not created for the game and is actually a modified 1992 photograph of Heckler & Koch USA sales executive John T. Meyer. The original image was used to promote the American launch of the USP in 1993. Heckler & Koch permitted the use of the image for the game and sent firearms instructors to assist with motion capture.

== Release ==
Tom Clancy's Rainbow Six was released for Windows on August 21, 1998, in North America and on October 23, 1998, in Europe. In North America, the game was released by Red Storm Entertainment, with SouthPeak Games handling distribution duties. Take-Two Interactive published the game in Europe.

The Nintendo 64 port was released in North America on November 17, 1999, and in the United Kingdom one month later on December 10. The PlayStation conversion was released in the United Kingdom on November 19, and in North America on November 23. A port for Mac OS was released on December 1, 1999. A distinct version of the game was released for Game Boy Color in North America April 12, 2000, and in the United Kingdom on November 10, 2000. The Dreamcast port was delayed several times before being released: initially expected to be released on September 9, 1999 as a launch title for the system, it was delayed to October 19, 1999 due to the difficulties of working with Windows CE during development, went gold on November 30, 1999 with an expected release date of December 9, and was finally released five months later on May 3, 2000 in North America by Majesco's publishing label Pipe Dream Interactive, and on February 2, 2001 in the United Kingdom by German publisher Swing! Entertainment.

After the release of the game, Tom Clancy offered to sign copies of the game for Red Storm employees, despite being relatively uninvolved in development, annoying several developers; as Upton opined, "Even though it had his name on the box, it wasn't his game. It was our game. He should have been asking us to sign a copy for him!"

The PAL PlayStation port of the game was one of 20 games preloaded on the PlayStation Classic (excluding the Japan, Taiwan, and Hong Kong releases), released on December 3, 2018.

=== Rainbow Six Mission Pack: Eagle Watch ===
Tom Clancy's Rainbow Six Mission Pack: Eagle Watch is an expansion pack of the original game, released exclusively for Windows in North America on January 26, 1999, and in Europe in February 1999. It adds five new missions, four new operatives from the Rainbow Six novel, three new weapons, and new multiplayer modes. The new missions, unrelated to each other or the original campaign, take place in 2001 and follow Rainbow's high-profile operations in landmark locations around the world, namely the Buran spaceplane in Russia, the Taj Mahal in India, the Forbidden City in China, the Palace of Westminster in the United Kingdom, and the Capitol in the United States. The expansion was packaged with the original game as Tom Clancy's Rainbow Six: Gold Pack Edition when it was released in 1999 in North America in June and in the United Kingdom in September. The Nintendo 64 port includes some of the missions from Eagle Watch, and the Dreamcast port contains all of them.

== Reception ==
Reception

Aggregate scores
Aggregator	Score
GameRankings	(PC) 82% (N64) 74% (PS) 48% (GBC) 54% (SDC) 72%
Metacritic	(PC) 85/100

Review scores
Publication	Score
AllGame	(PC) 3.5/5 (MAC/N64) 3/5 (PS/GBC) 2.5/5
Computer Gaming World	(PC) 3.5/5
Computer and Video Games	(PS) 2/5
Electronic Gaming Monthly	(N64) 7.62/10 (SDC) 7.33/10 (PS) 3.8/10
Game Informer	(N64) 8/10 (PS) 6.75/10
GamePro	4.5/5 (PS) 3.5/5
GameRevolution	A−
GameSpot	(SDC) 8.1/10 (PC) 8/10 (GBC) 7.4/10 (N64) 7.1/10 (PS) 3.7/10
GameSpy	3.5/10
IGN	(PC) 9.4/10 (N64) 8.5/10 (SDC) 8/10 (GBC) 5/10 (PS) 3.8/10
Next Generation	(PC) 4/5 (N64) 3/5 (SDC) 4/5
Nintendo Power	(N64) 7.9/10 (GBC) 6.9/10
Official U.S. PlayStation Magazine	1/5
PC Gamer (US)	93%
The Cincinnati Enquirer	4/5

Tom Clancy's Rainbow Six was met with mostly positive reviews on PC, though the console ports received relatively lower ratings. Review aggregator Metacritic displays a score of 85 out of 100 for the PC version. Video game review aggregator GameRankings displays scores of 82% for PC, 74% for the Nintendo 64, 48% for the PlayStation, 54% for the Game Boy Color, and 73% for the Dreamcast.

Overall gameplay was positively received. The game's difficulty and playstyle differences to contemporary shooters such as Quake II and GoldenEye 007 were highlighted by multiple reviewers, as was the detailed planning stage. Trent C. Ward, reviewing the PC version for IGN, praised the complexities of the planning stage, realistic damage, competent AI, and freedom to complete missions from multiple approaches, saying it was "unlike any first-person shooter yet made." PC Gamer US called the game "an enthralling package loaded to the brim with tense, nail-biting gameplay, slick technology, and excellent replayability" and "undoubtedly one of the most original and best games of the year." Jeremy Dunham of IGN, reviewing the Dreamcast port, praised the game's change in pace, saying, "Long exposed to mindless romps and pointless first-person gore-fest clones, the ability to actually think and THEN destroy puts a big ol' smile on my face." Push Square's Sam Brooke, reviewing the PlayStation port in a 2018 retrospective, enjoyed the sense of accomplishment from completing challenging missions properly, calling it "a trailblazer in its genre". Alan Dunkin of GameSpot noted the game could be difficult, but to the point of sometimes being frustrating.

Several reviews highlighted the game's realism and immersion. Dunkin stated "the immersive feeling of Rainbow Six is perhaps one of the best seen in a game." Christian Nutt, reviewing the Nintendo 64 port for GameSpot, said of Rainbow Six, "realism is the order of the day ... this game does deliver a military simulation on a very personal level." Next Generation commended the game's attempts at realism, but noted flaws in presentation such as the odd manner in which characters leaned around corners.

Multiplayer was singled out for praise, especially for the PC version. Ward praised the multiplayer functionality and its addictiveness, adding that "[f]or weeks now, the offices here have literally shut down as teams from IGN-PC, PC Gamer and PC Accelerator stop what they're doing to take each other on in a team deathmatch, or to cooperate on a difficult mission." Dunkin opined that the multiplayer "saves the game" from its other flaws. PC Gamer US favorably described the multiplayer functionality as "tense and exciting", but suggested the quick time-to-kill could make smaller matches simple and boring. Peter Olafson of GamePro said the multiplayer was "a nice-looking shooter" but criticized lag issues.

AI issues and glitches were subject to considerable criticism. Raphael Liberatore, reviewing the game for Computer Gaming World, criticized "faulty AI and game-killing bugs" for impeding "what could have been a benchmark game—a game troubled by what it could have been." Olafson singled out the lack of variation in AI behavior, with enemies idling and teammates only moving in single-file lines. Brooke criticized AI pathfinding through narrow corridors, recounting one mission where it took longer to extract a hostage than it did to find them in the first place. Ward also recalled experiencing several glitches and instances of teammates obstructing him, but opined such issues could easily be overlooked during gameplay.

=== Console ports ===
The Nintendo 64 port was well-received by most reviewers. Aaron Boulding of IGN said the only issue with the port was the shortened campaign, but Nutt considered the short length to be acceptable, viewing the multiple difficulty levels and the co-op mode as making up for it. Electronic Gaming Monthly highlighted the port's detailed graphics yet smooth framerate as impressive for the Nintendo 64, especially without having to resort to render fog. Mike Wolf of Next Generation gave it three stars out of five, stating that though it was "a fantastic game", its flaws meant it was "not a must-have". In a 2018 retrospective, N64 Today said the port still stood up 20 years after its release, but noted noticeable graphical issues, especially if not played on a CRT display.

The PlayStation port was widely panned as inferior to other versions. Official U.S. PlayStation Magazine gave it one star out of five. Nutt lambasted it as "awkward" and "aesthetically bankrupt", noting its apparent abandonment of the team leadership aspect, deeming it "an uninspired FPS with some weird hostage-saving minigame tacked on." IGN's Matt White criticized its unusually poor graphics, and called it "a mighty fine example for impressionable young developers of how not to handle a port." Brooke called the PlayStation port "janky" and "unpolished", but gave it credit for the game's influence.

The Game Boy Color version received mixed reviews. IGN's Craig Harris criticized it for removing risk factors such as enemy effectiveness and crossfire, thus making most planning and tactics worthless, though he commended Crawfish Interactive's ambition in adapting a three-dimensional shooter to a two-dimensional handheld. Frank Provo of GameSpot criticized AI issues, gameplay repetition, and noticeable reuse of sprites and sounds, but still considered it a faithful version for what it was.

The Dreamcast port was very well-received. Garrett Kenyon of Next Generation gave it four stars out of five, calling it "[a]n impressive PC translation that Dreamcast owners should certainly consider owning." Erik Wolpaw, reviewing the Dreamcast port for GameSpot, stated it was a faithful port of the PC game and "as deep and challenging as action games get", though he criticized its long loading times, lack of multiplayer, and unusually complex method of issuing commands—over 35 exist, but require specific combinations of joystick and button inputs. Dunham had the same criticisms, noting these issues still existed in the final release despite an eight-month delay in the port's development, but nonetheless deemed it "one of the deepest, most realistic games to inhabit the Dreamcast so far."

=== Eagle Watch ===
Mike Lohrey of IGN reviewed the Eagle Watch expansion, praising its new levels and additions but criticizing AI awareness issues and inconsistent damage mechanics compared to the original game. Liberatore, who had previously panned the original game, rated Eagle Watch 4.5 out of 5, stating it "vastly improved the original, AI included, making R6 the standout title it deserves to be."

=== Accolades ===
The Academy of Interactive Arts & Sciences nominated Rainbow Six for "PC Action Game of the Year" during the 2nd Annual Interactive Achievement Awards, but it lost to Half-Life. Rainbow Six was a finalist for Computer Gaming World's 1998 "Best Action" award, which ultimately went to Battlezone. The editors wrote that Rainbow Six "deftly mixed strategic planning with nail-biting action as it brought the world of counterterrorist operations to life." PC Gamer US named Rainbow Six the best action game of 1998. CNN, in partnership with Games.net, named Rainbow Six one of the "top 25 game downloads of 1998".

=== Sales ===
In the United States, Rainbow Six's Windows release sold 218,183 copies during 1998, accounting for $8.86 million in revenue that year. The PC version's Gold Edition release sold another 321,340 copies in the United States during 1999, and was the country's 12th-best-selling computer game that year. According to Gamasutra, Rainbow Six and Rainbow Six: Rogue Spear together sold 450,000 copies "during the first half of the 2001/2002 fiscal year".
