= Tom Clancy's Rainbow Six 3: Raven Shield =

2003 video game

- Developers: Ubi Soft Montreal; Ubi Soft Milan; Red Storm Entertainment (Note: Mac OS X version developed by i5works.)
- Publisher: Ubi Soft (Note: Mac OS X version published by Aspyr.) (Note: Mobile version developed and published by Gameloft.)
- Producers: Mathieu Ferland; Chadi Lebbos
- Designers: Mike McCoy; Carl Lavoie
- Programmer: Eric Bégin
- Artists: Carol Bertrand; Josef Sy
- Composer: Bill Brown
- Series: Tom Clancy's Rainbow Six
- Engine: Unreal Engine 2
- Platforms: Windows, Mac OS X, mobile phone
- Release: Windows: NA: March 18, 2003; EU: March 21, 2003; Mac OS X: EU: October 31, 2003; NA: December 17, 2003; Mobile; January 12, 2004
- Genre: Tactical shooter
- Modes: Single-player, multiplayer

Tom Clancy's Rainbow Six 3: Raven Shield is a 2003 tactical first-person shooter video game developed by Red Storm Entertainment and published by Ubi Soft for Microsoft Windows and Mac OS X. It is the third entry in the Rainbow Six series. The game's plot follows Rainbow, a secret international counterterrorist organization, as they respond to a wave of terrorist attacks threatening South America.

Based on Unreal Engine 2, Raven Shield is a tactical shooter with realistic properties. Raven Shield moved toward mainstream first-person shooters like Counter-Strike, adapting various features absent in previous versions. These included the ability to see one's weapon while in the first-person view, new weapons and upgrades (including larger magazines and sights), and a revamped multiplayer.

A console version, Tom Clancy's Rainbow Six 3, was developed and published by Ubisoft for the Xbox, PlayStation 2, and GameCube. This iteration of the game features the same basic engine, models, textures, and artwork, but with significantly different game mechanics, gameplay, and storyline.

Due to the console version's success on the Xbox and the popularity of Xbox Live, an Xbox-exclusive semi-sequel was released in 2004 titled Tom Clancy's Rainbow Six 3: Black Arrow. The next main game in the Rainbow Six series, Tom Clancy's Rainbow Six: Lockdown, was released in 2005.

== Windows and Mac ==
=== Plot ===
In 1945, two Ustaše members escape the Independent State of Croatia with Holocaust loot, leaving documents relating to it in a Croatian bank. Sixty years later, in 2005, a group of assailants enters the bank overnight, kills its occupants, and destroys the documents.

Meanwhile, Rainbow, led by John Clark and advised by Kevin Sweeney, responds to a series of neo-fascist terrorist attacks targeting South American oil interests and European financial institutions. They are soon deployed to intervene in shootouts in the Cayman Islands between drug smugglers and the Cayman Islands Police Force, including one at the mansion of Croatian billionaire Nikola Gospić, who claims the smugglers broke in.

Rainbow's suspicions arise after a series of raids and terrorist attacks on locations across South America connected to Gospić and the smugglers, including an unusually violent attack on a meat-packing facility in Argentina which Gospić owns a minority stake in, and a raid on an import-export company in Brazil storing chemical weapons components. Rainbow finds a link between Gospić and far-right Argentine presidential candidate Alvaro Gutierrez, who is himself tied to an earlier attack on a Swiss bank. After killing a British Neo-Nazi with ties to Gospić and Gutierrez during a hostage situation and stopping the contamination of meat at the meat-packing facility with VX, Rainbow deduces Gospić is stockpiling chemical weapons and raids the meat-packing facility and his mansion.

Rainbow learns that Gospić is an escaped Ustaše official, one of the two men in the opening cutscene. Dying of liver cancer, Gospić intends to use his vast wealth to resurrect global fascism before he dies: by buying South American oil fields and killing swaths of people across the continent, he would spark an economic crisis, then use his oil profits to raise an international fascist movement and form Greater Croatia under fascist rule. To bring about the crisis, he plans to attack Festa Junina celebrations in Rio de Janeiro with blister gas. Rainbow assaults a garage where Gospić is preparing a parade float filled with blister gas, killing Gospić and preventing the attack. Gutierrez is promptly arrested, and he admits everything to Clark in interrogation.

=== Expansions ===
==== Athena Sword ====
Box art for Rainbow Six 3: Athena Sword on Microsoft Windows

Athena Sword is the first expansion for the PC version of Raven Shield. Athena Sword builds upon the original by adding eight new missions, five new multiplayer maps, three new multiplayer game modes, and seven new weapons. Athena Sword was developed by Ubisoft Milan and released on March 9, 2004. A Mac port was released on November 23, 2004. Athena Sword was packaged with the original game as Tom Clancy's Rainbow Six 3 Gold Edition in 2004.

===== Plot =====
In 2007, a few months after defeating Gospić and imprisoning Gutierrez, Rainbow responds to a series of consecutive terrorist attacks in Italy. Rainbow learns they possess chemical weapons and that they are followers of Gutierrez; when questioned, Gutierrez promises a "surprise", suggesting his complicity. Rainbow finds an informant in arms dealer Giovanni Bagattini and rescues him from several attempts on his life. The terrorists raid a warehouse where the Polizia di Stato have stored their confiscated chemical gas; Rainbow repels them but finds the terrorists have stolen a barrel, which they intend to use for Gutierrez's "surprise". Rainbow tracks the terrorists to Athens, Greece, and prevents them from releasing the gas in an agora. In the aftermath, Gutierrez is delivered a newspaper reporting the terrorists' defeat; two days later, he hangs himself in his cell.

==== Iron Wrath ====
Iron Wrath is the second expansion for the PC version of Raven Shield. It was in production for almost 2 years before Ubisoft decided to release it as a free download for FilePlanet subscribers on June 9, 2005. Developed by Ubisoft Casablanca, this expansion features a 7-mission campaign in which Rainbow neutralizes a terrorist nuclear bomb threat, 3 classic missions, 8 new multiplayer maps, 6 new weapons, and 5 new multiplayer game modes. In October 2008, the CD-key activation server was taken offline, suspending the multiplayer features of Iron Wrath. This free expansion remains available on the website ModDB.

==== Gold Edition and Complete ====
Rainbow Six 3: Gold Edition and Rainbow Six 3: Complete are compilation sets that both consist of Raven Shield and Athena Sword, with Complete also including Iron Wrath.

=== Development ===
Tom Clancy's Rainbow Six 3: Raven Shield was developed for Microsoft Windows from around November, 2000 (according to the game's credit screen), to February, 13, 2003, which it was finished as the development neared completion, and through a collaboration between Ubisoft and Red Storm Entertainment, including Ubisoft's other studio, Montreal and Milan, after their acquisition in August, 30, 2000. The development team consisted around 50 people, who built the game in the latest Unreal Engine. Tom Clancy had veto power with every project that bore his name, including Rainbow Six and would demand changes through an intermediary if he found it necessary.

== Console versions ==
Tom Clancy's Rainbow Six 3
- Developers: Ubisoft Montreal (Xbox); Ubisoft Shanghai (PS2, GCN)
- Publisher: Ubisoft
- Series: Tom Clancy's Rainbow Six
- Platforms: Xbox; PlayStation 2 GameCube
- Release: Xbox: NA: October 28, 2003; EU: November 7, 2003; PlayStation 2: NA: March 23, 2004; EU: March 26, 2004; GameCube: NA: June 15, 2004; EU: June 25, 2004
- Genre: Tactical shooter
- Modes: Single-player, multiplayer

Tom Clancy's Rainbow Six 3 was initially ported to Microsoft's Xbox console to take advantage of the Xbox Live online functionality. The Xbox version was developed by Ubisoft Montreal. The game was later ported to the PlayStation 2 and GameCube in early 2004 by developer Ubisoft Shanghai. The GameCube version is limited to two players for local multiplayer. Although both games are titled Rainbow Six 3, this version is not subtitled Raven Shield and contains partially different content. For instance, the multiplayer maps in the console and PC versions are different, with some appearing only in the console versions, and others in the PC version.

The Xbox version of the game features downloadable content in the form of additional levels for users with access to the Xbox Live service. All the expansion levels are intended for use in the online multiplayer mode. Xbox Live for the original Xbox shut down on April 15, 2010, but Tom Clancy's Rainbow Six 3 is playable online on the replacement online servers for the Xbox called Insignia

=== Gameplay ===
The gameplay in the console version of Rainbow Six 3 deviates from its PC counterpart in a number of important areas, notably the exclusion of a mission planning stage and the inability to control multiple characters. Instead, players take the role of Rainbow field commander Domingo Chavez and lead a single fireteam consisting of Eddie Price, Louis Loiselle, and Dieter Weber through each of the game's missions. Orders can be issued to the teammates using either an in-game menu or through voice commands via the Xbox Live headset. This, however, suffered from slight misunderstandings between similar phrases such as "open frag and clear" and "open flash and clear", and vice versa. To compensate for the decreased control players have over their squad, the squad AI has been improved, with squadmates being able to automatically duck behind objects or assume covering positions within an area. Each teammate has their own unique voice as opposed to generic voices in the PC version.

The action is also slightly more forgiving in the console version. Chavez and his teammates each have a health bar consisting of four units of health. In the console versions, it is possible for the player to sustain several bullet hits before dying.

=== Plot ===
In 2007, a Rainbow team commanded by Domingo Chavez responds to a series of terrorist attacks with the same demands: an end to Venezuelan oil exports to the United States. Though they initially target the oil industry and PDVSA, the attacks soon shift to target Venezuelan presidential candidate Juan Crespo. Meanwhile, suspicions mount that Saudi Arabia is responsible for the attacks, which Clark fears could escalate into a war.

Chavez's team extracts Nusrat Ahmad, an informant who infiltrated multiple terrorist networks; Ahmad informs Clark that Emilio Vargas, Crespo's right-hand man, played a role in an earlier break-in in Boston where financial records relating to the terrorist attacks were stolen from a vault. After Chavez's team rescues Crespo from an attack while touring Alcatraz Federal Penitentiary, Rainbow learns Vargas is connected to Middle Eastern terrorists. Chavez's team raids an import-export firm owned by Vargas, and Chavez sneaks into Vargas' Caracas penthouse to gather intel, from which they learn Vargas possesses VX.

Rainbow manages to seize VX from a meat-packing facility and tracks down additional VX—along with Vargas himself—to a garage in New Orleans. Clark interrogates Vargas, who reveals Crespo is ordering the attacks to rally support for his campaign; upon being elected President of Venezuela, Crespo would engineer an oil crisis to sell oil on the black market at high prices for his own gain. Rainbow also learns Crespo plans to orchestrate terrorist attacks against the U.S. with a Saudi dissident, allowing the dissident to take control of Saudi Arabia after American military intervention. With an impending attack targeting Mardi Gras celebrations, Chavez's team deploys to New Orleans, locating and defusing a VX-loaded bomb.

With the attack prevented and his plans foiled, Crespo attempts to flee Venezuela with his remaining VX canisters. Rainbow intercepts Crespo at Simón Bolívar International Airport and Chavez assassinates him before he can escape. With the threat subsided, Clark congratulates Chavez and his team, and Rainbow frames the terrorists for the assassination.

=== Development ===
The Xbox version of Rainbow Six 3 was exhibited at Games Convention 2003 and E3 2003.

A poster in a level of the game contained a link to an unowned website; subsequently, the website was registered and filled with pornography by a man who noticed that the URL was unregistered. Ubisoft released a statement saying that they refuse to buy the domain, stating that "Ubisoft has a clear policy that under any circumstances it will not pay blackmail money to anyone. It was an honest oversight on our part not to register the 'made up' URL."

=== Tom Clancy's Rainbow Six 3: Black Arrow ===
Developed by Ubisoft Milan, Black Arrow is a semi-sequel to the console version of Rainbow Six 3. Still titled Tom Clancy's Rainbow Six 3, Black Arrow was developed and published by Ubisoft and released for the Xbox on August 3, 2004. Like Rainbow Six 3, Black Arrow was created to take advantage of Microsoft's popular Xbox Live online service. Along with two new online game modes: Total Conquest and Retrieval, and a new offline mode, Lone Rush, changes were also implemented into Black Arrow from the original Rainbow Six 3. A noticeable change was made to combat the unfair advantages of "lean walking". This change still allows the player to lean but is unable to move until they return to the original standing straight posture.

== Reception ==
Tom Clancy's Rainbow Six 3: Raven Shield

Aggregate scores
Aggregator	Score
GameRankings	(Xbox) 88.06% (PC) 85.64% (Mobile 2) 84.50% (Mobile 1) 76.33% (PS2) 72.71% (GC) 68.35%
Metacritic	(Xbox) 86/100 (PC) 83/100 (PS2) 70/100 (GC) 68/100

Review scores
Publication	Score
AllGame	3.5/5
Electronic Gaming Monthly	(Xbox) 8.5/10 (PS2) 5.67/10
Eurogamer	(PC) 9/10 (Xbox) 8/10
Game Informer	(Xbox) 8.5/10 (PC) 7.25/10 (PS2) 7/10 (GC) 5.75/10
GamePro	(PC) 4.5/5; 3.5/5
GameRevolution	B+
GameSpot	(PC) 8.7/10 (Xbox) 8.4/10 (Mobile 1) 8.2/10 (Mobile 2) 8.1/10; 6.9/10
GameSpy	4.5/5 (PS2 & GC) 3/5
GameZone	(Xbox) 9.3/10 (PS2) 6.9/10 (GC) 6.8/10
IGN	(Mobile) 9.5/10 (Xbox) 9.3/10 (PC) 8.6/10 (PS2) 7/10 (GC) 6.5/10
Nintendo Power	3.2/5
Official U.S. PlayStation Magazine	4/5
Official Xbox Magazine (US)	9.2/10
PC Gamer (US)	80%
The Times	3/5

By the end of 2003, sales of Rainbow Six 3 had reached 1.3 million copies. The game sold 2.2 million copies by the end of March 2004.

Reception of the game ranged from positive to mixed. GameRankings and Metacritic gave it a score of 88.06% and 86 out of 100 for the Xbox version; 85.64% and 83 out of 100 for the PC version; 76.33% for the first mobile version of the game and 84.50% for the second one; 72.71% and 70 out of 100 for the PlayStation 2 version; and 68.35% and 68 out of 100 for the GameCube version.

IGN gave the PC version an 8.6 out of 10, saying, "Not only does it continue the series' tradition of intense realism and the unforgiving consequences of close-quarters combat, it does it better than any of the previous titles in the series." GameSpot said: "Despite its minor flaws, Raven Shield is still a very impressive addition to the series and a very worthy heir to the Rainbow Six name," and gave the same version an 8.7 out of 10. The publication later named it the best computer game of March 2003. Famitsu gave the Xbox version a score of 8, 7, 8, and 7, combined for a score of 30 out of 40; Edge gave the same version a score of six out of ten and called it "a stupefyingly linear experience. While the individual standoffs and shoot-outs are exhilarating, the removal of any sense of choice or any requirement of tactical thought makes this more of a theme park ride than a military operation."

Computer Gaming World nominated Raven Shield for their 2003 "Shooter of the Year" award, which ultimately went to Call of Duty. GameSpot named its mobile version the best mobile game of July 2004.

During the 7th Annual Interactive Achievement Awards, the Academy of Interactive Arts & Sciences honored Rainbow Six 3 with the "Console First-Person Action Game of the Year" award, along with receiving a nomination for "Outstanding Achievement in Sound Design".

=== Athena Sword ===
Athena Sword

Aggregate scores
Aggregator	Score
GameRankings	71.09%
Metacritic	72/100

Review scores
Publication	Score
Game Informer	7.25/10
GameSpot	7.8/10
GameSpy	3/5
IGN	7.8/10
PC Format	76%
PC Gamer (UK)	69%
PC Gamer (US)	80%
PC Zone	72%
X-Play	3/5

The expansion pack Athena Sword was met with average reception, as GameRankings gave it a score of 71.09%, while Metacritic gave it 72 out of 100. It was nominated for GameSpot's 2004 "Best Expansion Pack" award, which went to Rise of Nations: Thrones and Patriots.

=== Black Arrow ===
Black Arrow

Aggregate scores
Aggregator	Score
GameRankings	84.69%
Metacritic	84/100

Review scores
Publication	Score
Electronic Gaming Monthly	7.83/10
Eurogamer	8/10
Famitsu	29/40
Game Informer	8/10
GamePro	4/5
GameRevolution	B
GameSpot	8.5/10
GameSpy	4.5/5
GameZone	9.5/10
IGN	9.3/10
Official Xbox Magazine (US)	7.9/10
X-Play	4/5
The Sydney Morning Herald	4/5

The Xbox-exclusive Black Arrow was met with positive reception; GameRankings gave it a score of 84.69%, while Metacritic gave it 84 out of 100.
