= Tom Clancy's Ghost Recon (2010 video game) =

- North American box art
- Developer: Next Level Games
- Publisher: Ubisoft
- Director: Mike Inglehart
- Producers: Paul Martin; Bjorn Nash; Eric Randall
- Designer: Anthony Doe
- Artist: Geoff Coates
- Writers: Richard E. Dansky; Mike Inglehart; Geoff Coates
- Composers: Mike Peacock; Darren Radtke; Tom Salta; Chad York
- Series: Tom Clancy's Ghost Recon
- Platform: Wii
- Release: NA: November 16, 2010; EU: November 19, 2010; AU: November 25, 2010
- Genre: Tactical shooter
- Mode: Single-player

Tom Clancy's Ghost Recon is a tactical shooter video game developed by Next Level Games and published by Ubisoft exclusively for the Wii. The game, set in modern-day Norway and Russia, follows the efforts of two United States Army Rangers in toppling a fictional ultranationalist Russian regime.

== Gameplay ==
Tom Clancy’s Ghost Recon makes use of the Wii controller’s motion sensors for aiming. During levels, players move from cover to cover as they clear the area of enemies, gradually making their way toward checkpoints. The game is designed to be played by two players in a co-op setting, with each player taking control of one of the game’s protagonists, but will substitute the second player for an NPC if a second controller is not connected.

== Setting ==
The events of Tom Clancy’s Ghost Recon take place shortly after a fictional coup in Russia brings ultranationalist leader, Alexandr Treskayev, to power. Treskayev and his regime subsequently invaded and occupied Scandinavia, resulting in the formation of an international coalition to liberate captured territories and bring an end to the regime. Players take control of Dalton Hibbard or Joe Booth, two army rangers deployed in Norway to take part in the liberation efforts.

== Plot ==
United States Army Rangers, Dalton Hibbard and Joe Booth, are deployed in Norway with the task of aiding a pinned-down squadron of fellow soldiers. They fight their way to a disabled assault drone, repair it, and use it to rescue their compatriots and disable an ultranationalist tank convoy.

For their heroic actions in Norway, the pair is selected to be involved in an early invasion of Moscow two months later. Unfortunately, while driving through the city, the duo’s transport is hit by a rocket-propelled grenade, leaving them stranded in hostile territory. Hibbard and Booth fight their way to a safe house, where they spend the night and are briefed on how they should proceed.

Rested and resupplied, the Rangers are tasked with coming to the aid of an ultranationalist officer who defected from the regime. After saving the officer, Hibbard and Booth capture or destroy numerous ultranationalist sites, gradually wearing down Maxim Cherskiy, the general put in charge of Moscow. They are briefly captured by the Russians but escape with the help of a defected ultranationalist soldier.

After countless successful missions, the Rangers are tasked with breaking into Cherskiy’s headquarters, a skyscraper in Moscow, and collecting evidence off of Cherskiy’s computers proving that he committed war crimes. Hibbard and Booth use the subway network to approach the building and shoot their way inside. After gathering the required intelligence from the lower levels of the building the Rangers are informed that Cherskiy is present on the top floor of the building and that their new mission is two capture or eliminate him. Hibbard and Booth race to the roof of the headquarters and find Cherskiy boarding a helicopter. Knowing that they will never reach Cherskiy before he escapes, the Rangers open fire on him. Cherskiy is struck in the torso by multiple bullets and falls from the top of the building to his death. Looking down upon the fallen commander, Hibbard and Booth are informed that Moscow has successfully been liberated.

== Reception ==
Reception

Aggregate score
Aggregator	Score
Metacritic	46/100

Review scores
Publication	Score
Game Informer	4.5/10
GameSpot	6/10
IGN	3/10

Tom Clancy's Ghost Recon received mixed to negative reviews. It was given a score of 3 on IGN, 4.5 on Game Informer, and 6 on GameSpot. It has an aggregate score of 46.87% on GameRankings and 46/100 on Metacritic.
