= Tom Clancy's Ghost Recon (2001 video game) =

2001 video game

- Developer: Red Storm Entertainment (Note: Mac OS version developed by i5works)
- Publisher: Ubi Soft (Note: Mac OS version published by Aspyr)
- Producer: Darren Chukitus
- Designer: Brian Upton
- Programmer: Clark Gibson
- Artists: Eric Armstrong; Travis Getz; Mike Haynes; John Sonedecker
- Writer: Tom Clancy (idea)
- Composer: Bill Brown
- Series: Tom Clancy's Ghost Recon
- Platforms: Windows, Mac OS, Xbox, PlayStation 2, GameCube
- Release: Microsoft Windows: NA: November 13, 2001; EU: November 23, 2001; Mac OS: NA: October 31, 2002; Xbox: NA: November 12, 2002; EU: December 6, 2002; PlayStation 2: NA: December 5, 2002; EU: December 6, 2002; GameCube: NA: February 11, 2003; EU: March 20, 2003
- Genre: Tactical shooter
- Modes: Single-player, multiplayer

Tom Clancy's Ghost Recon is a tactical shooter video game developed by Red Storm Entertainment and published by Ubi Soft in 2001 for Microsoft Windows. It is the first game in the Ghost Recon series. It was ported to Mac OS, Xbox and PlayStation 2 in 2002 and to the GameCube in 2003. Ports for N-Gage and Game Boy Advance were planned, but later canceled. Unlike Clancy's other tactical shooter series, such as Rainbow Six, Ghost Recon is not based on any of his books, instead he wrote the game himself.

Together with Rainbow Six, SWAT 3, and Operation Flashpoint, game industry experts generally credit Ghost Recon with defining and refining the tactical shooter genre. Ghost Recon's success spawned two expansion packs, Desert Siege and Island Thunder, as well as numerous sequels, including Ghost Recon 2 and Ghost Recon Advanced Warfighter.

== Gameplay ==
In this mission, the Ghost teams are arrived in Russia for an allied forces rescue.

Ghost Recon puts the player in charge of the eponymous Ghosts, a fictional squad of United States Special Operations Forces soldiers from Delta Company, 1st Battalion, 5th Special Forces Group. They are organized into three fireteams named using the NATO phonetic alphabet: Alpha, Bravo, and Charlie, with space for three soldiers per team (the Xbox, PlayStation 2 and GameCube versions do not have a Charlie team available). However, only six soldiers can be selected per mission. The player enjoys limited tactical control on the battlefield by issuing maneuver commands and rules of engagement for each fireteam through a command map. There are 3 difficulties; Recruit, Veteran, and Elite. Recruit offers unlimited ammo for some weapons, while the level of difficulty corresponds with the level of responsiveness and "training" of the AI.

The soldiers themselves are organized into four different character classes. Every class can carry a primary and secondary weapon, which are organized into "kits". Even though the primary weapon remains the same in all the kits (being defined by the soldier class — see below), there is a variety of equipment to be chosen as the secondary weapon.

- Rifleman: The predominant soldier class in the game, riflemen can use a variety of different weapon kits. Their primary weapon is the M16 assault rifle. Secondaries include the M203 grenade launcher, the M9 pistol, spare magazines, or a pair of binoculars (in later versions these were replaced with deployable sensors, since binoculars were supplied to all Ghosts).
- Support: Support soldiers provide a high volume of suppressive fire with the M249 Squad Automatic Weapon. As the soldier is equipped for short range, he also carries more armor. In addition to the machine gun, the support class may also carry the M9 (suppressed), M67 fragmentation grenades, or additional magazines.
- Demolitions ("Demo"): Demolitions personnel are specialists in destroying large structures and can serve in the anti-tank role. Their primary weapon is the M4 carbine. This soldier can also be equipped with demolition charges, grenades, extra magazines, Claymore mines, or the M136 AT4 anti-tank rocket.
- Sniper: Distinguishable by their ghillie suits, the sniper can provide fire support over long ranges while hidden. Primarily equipped with the U.S. Army's M24 rifle, they can also be equipped with the standard and silenced M9, extra magazines or grenades.

For every completed mission in the single-player campaign, each soldier that survives gains one Combat Point to upgrade their attributes. There are four basic categories of skill:

- Weapon: affects the accuracy and aiming of the weapon; the reticule will close faster and tighter as more points are added.
- Stealth: enhances the ability of the soldier to remain undetected and reduces noise generated by the soldier moving.
- Endurance: improves recovery time when taking hits, increases the soldier's ability to survive a wound and reduces the effect of heavy equipment on speed.
- Leadership: for every three points of skill, all other soldiers in the same fireteam gain an extra point to each of their statistics. The bonus can only apply if the soldier with the high leadership skill is the fireteam's point man.

The player also unlocks "specialists" from NATO or allied countries by completing extra mission objectives. The specialists are more experienced than the Ghosts and have more Combat Points, making them an essential part of the team. They are also equipped with weapons not available to standard soldiers. Two specialists are armed with the Objective Individual Combat Weapon, as part of field tests and implementation of the U.S. Army's Land Warrior program. The specialist corps includes three women, who are the only female combatants in the game.

The game is played entirely from the first-person perspective. A heads-up display relays information such as the name of the soldier the player is controlling, the soldier's assigned fireteam, weapon and ammo counter, a threat indicator, the targeting reticule, health status, and a stance indicator (to show whether the character is standing, crouched, or prone).

Players will engage most often with either rebel militia, or Russian foot soldiers, who have varying levels of body armor, some being capable of stopping most small-arms fire, and varying levels of accuracy and reactions to the player. Occasionally the player will come face-to-face with armored threats, such as cargo trucks, or civilian trucks with mounted machine guns, and APC's, but the player may also encounter tanks, which requires the M136 recoilless anti-tank rifle in order to destroy. Soldiers are very mobile and adaptive, using cover, going prone, providing suppressive fire, and flanking and sneaking up on the player. Enemy visibility is based on weather conditions as well as the level of light available. Vehicles follow strict movement options.

Bullets will not penetrate most objects, but they will break glass and deflate tires. Explosives or heavy gunfire can be used to destroy wooden doors, and (in the case of explosives) potentially kill anyone within the blast radius on the other side. Depending on a target's armor, it is generally possible to neutralize a threat with one or two well-placed shots.

Soldiers rendered "out of action" during a mission are considered to be dead, and not available for the rest of the campaign. Wounded soldiers who survive a mission will remain wounded unless they are replaced with a healthy soldier for the next mission.

Ghost Recon has both single player and multiplayer modes of play. Up to 36 players are supported in the PC version's multiplayer over an internet (TCP/IP) connection or LAN.

== Plot ==
In April 2008, Russia is taken over by ultranationalists led by Dmitri Arbatov, who annex Ukraine, Belarus, and Kazakhstan to form the Russian Democratic Union (RDU), a political and military alliance dedicated to recreating the former Soviet Union. Meanwhile in Georgia, the U.S. Army's elite "Ghost" special forces unit battles South Ossetian separatists who are harassing the Georgian government and their allies. In response to their presence, the RDU complains to the United Nations that the United States has interfered in their internal affairs, and the Russian Armed Forces invade Georgia to support the rebels; in turn, the Ghosts support the Defence Forces of Georgia and U.S. reinforcements, who slow the Russian advance. However, the Russians' numerical advantage overwhelms the Georgian defenders, prompting the U.S. to pivot toward evacuating Americans and foreign nationals as Russian forces push deeper into the country. Eventually, the Russian military captures Tbilisi and the RDU controversially proclaims its annexation of Georgia, forcing the Ghosts to withdraw, while the Georgian government sets up a government-in-exile in Geneva, Switzerland.

The RDU's expansionism continues when they invade the Baltic states three days ahead of NATO intelligence estimates. The Ghosts deploy to slow the invasion ahead of U.S. and NATO forces, who defeat the Russians in Latvia and Lithuania, forcing them out of the region and prompting further Ghost deployments into RDU territory to rescue American prisoners of war and Russian political prisoners. The RDU government blames President Arbatov for their losses, places him under house arrest, and eventually executes him in a coup d'état. The death of Arbatov results in a massive loss of domestic support for the RDU government and the rise of an anti-RDU insurgency, while the Ghosts covertly attack Russian military facilities in Murmansk and Arkhangelsk to cripple their combat capabilities.

During a battle between U.S.-backed Russian deserters and RDU forces north of Moscow, the RDU detonates a nuclear weapon, prompting strong international condemnation as the RDU collapses into civil war between RDU ultranationalists and Russian loyalists. Acting Russian Prime Minister Karpin privately requests NATO support, and NATO forces enter Russia to fight the ultranationalists and support the loyalists. After the Ghosts break through a major ultranationalist defensive line, NATO forces occupy Moscow and corner the last ultranationalist holdouts inside the Red Square. The Ghosts launch a final assault and capture the Kremlin, forcing the ultranationalists to surrender on November 10, 2008. The war ends as the Americans and Russians celebrate liberation.

== Development ==
The game was in development as early as November 20th, 2000. Motion capture was used for character animation. The lead designer was Brian Upton and the soundtrack was composed by Bill Brown.

== Expansion packs and related games ==
=== Desert Siege ===
Tom Clancy's Ghost Recon: Desert Siege is a 2002 expansion pack, released for Microsoft Windows as a separate purchase and can be unlocked as a new campaign in the PlayStation 2 version of Tom Clancy's Ghost Recon. It is also bundled with the Mac port. The expansion pack adds 2 new multiplayer game types (Domination and Siege), 5 new multiplayer maps, new weapons for use in multiplayer, and an eight-mission single player campaign, which also unlocks a new specialist soldier (Jodit Haile). In the PlayStation 2 version, players who start Desert Siege by finishing the Ghost Recon campaign first will also retain the soldiers they used in the campaign, including their statistics.

=== Island Thunder ===
Tom Clancy's Ghost Recon: Island Thunder was released in late 2002 as an expansion pack for Microsoft Windows, and as a standalone game for Xbox. It contains eight new single player missions, 12 new weapons, 5 new dedicated multiplayer maps, 3 new multiplayer modes (Cat and Mouse, Defend, and Behemoth). On the Xbox, Island Thunder features five additional missions and twelve multiplayer maps.

Tom Clancy's Ghost Recon: Island Thunder was never released for the PlayStation 2, but its content was combined with eight new single-player missions set in Colombia and additional multiplayer maps and released under the title Tom Clancy's Ghost Recon: Jungle Storm in 2004.

In addition to the official expansion packs, the very active Ghost Recon modding scene (over 1,000 mods have been published as of January 2013) has produced a large number of unofficial expansions packs for PC. Free expansions like Frostbite, CENTCOM, Heroes Unleashed, and Year of the Monkey (among others) have gained huge popularity, with download counts in the hundreds of thousands, and attaining community-based awards.

== Reception ==
Reception

Aggregate score
Aggregator	Score
Metacritic	(GC) 59/100 (PC) 80/100 (PS2) 63/100 (Xbox) 84/100

Review scores
Publication	Score
AllGame	4/5
Electronic Gaming Monthly	7.83/10
Eurogamer	8/10
Game Informer	(PC) 9/10 (Xbox) 8.5/10 (GC) 7.75/10
GamePro	4/5 (PS2) 3/5
GameRevolution	B+
GameSpot	(Xbox) 8.4/10 (PC) 7.3/10; 5.5/10
GameSpy	(Xbox) 82% (PC) 76% (PS2) 61% (GC) 2/5
GameZone	(Xbox) 9.5/10 (PC) 8/10 (PS2) 6.8/10 (GC) 6.4/10
IGN	(PC) 9.3/10 (Xbox) 8.8/10 (GC) 4.5/10 (PS2) 4/10
Nintendo Power	3.5/5
Official U.S. PlayStation Magazine	3.5/5
Official Xbox Magazine (US)	9/10
PC Gamer (US)	93%
The Cincinnati Enquirer	4.5/5
FHM	2/5

Tom Clancy's Ghost Recon received "mixed or average" for the PlayStation 2 and GameCube versions, while the PC and Xbox versions received "generally positive" reviews, according to review aggregator platform Metacritic.

Ghost Recon was a commercial success. By the end of 2001, sales of its computer version had reached 430,000 units. The series' sales surpassed 760,000 copies by the end of March 2002. In the United States, the computer version of Ghost Recon sold 240,000 copies and earned $10.1 million by August 2006. Edge named it the country's 83rd best-selling computer game between January 2000 and August 2006. Combined sales of all Ghost Recon series computer games released between those dates had reached 620,000 in the United States by August 2006. The computer version of Ghost Recon also received a "Silver" sales award from the Entertainment and Leisure Software Publishers Association (ELSPA), indicating sales of at least 100,000 copies in the United Kingdom.

Sales of the game's Xbox and PlayStation 2 versions surpassed 2 million copies by the end of June 2003, and helped to drive Ubisoft's Q1 2003/2004 revenues to a record high for the company. By July 2006, the PlayStation 2 version of Ghost Recon had sold 1.1 million copies and earned $39 million in the United States alone. Next Generation ranked it as the 46th highest-selling game launched for the Xbox, PlayStation 2 or GameCube between January 2000 and July 2006 in that country.

=== Awards ===
The editors of PC Gamer US presented Ghost Recon with their 2001 "Best Sound" and overall "Game of the Year" awards, and wrote that "few games have made us cringe in shock, roar with aggression, or exult in victory the way Ghost Recon has." Tom Clancy's Ghost Recon was also named Best Game of the Year in 2001 by IGN. Ghost Recon was a runner-up in IGN's "Best Action Game 2001" and "Best Use Of Sound" ("Reader's Choice"). Wargamer gave it three bronze awards in "Game of the Year", awarded Red Storm with "Game Developer of the Year", and gave "Game Publisher of the Year" to Ubisoft. During the 5th Annual Interactive Achievement Awards, Ghost Recon received nominations for the "Online Gameplay" and "Sound Design" awards by the Academy of Interactive Arts & Sciences (AIAS).

Ghost Recon's Xbox version won GameSpot's 2002 "Best Sound on Xbox" award, and was nominated for "Best Online Game on Xbox" and "Best Shooter on Xbox". During the AIAS' 6th Annual Interactive Achievement Awards, the Xbox version received a nomination for "Console First-Person Action Game of the Year"

== Legacy ==
In August 2008, the Russo-Georgian war began, and a number of commentators noted that this real-world event was somewhat similar to the plot of Tom Clancy's Ghost Recon, namely how the flashpoint for the conflict was in the Russian-backed separatist states of South Ossetia and Abkhazia and led to direct Russian intervention on their behalves.
