= Tom Clancy's Power Plays =

Series of novels

Tom Clancy's Power Plays is a novel series created by authors Tom Clancy and Martin Greenberg. Each entry in the series is written by Jerome Preisler.

== Novel series ==
#	Title	Publication date	ISBN	Plot	Notes
1	Politika	1997	ISBN 0-425-16278-8	In 1999, a deadly terrorist attack stuns the United States, and all evidence points to a member of the Russian Federation's newly formed provisional government. American businessman Roger Gordian finds his multinational corporation and its employees in jeopardy. Determined to find those responsible for the attack, he calls upon his crisis control team to intervene. But Gordian doesn't realize how far the terrorists will go – and how much he has to lose...	Also made into a video game of the same name. The book comes with a demo version of the game on mini-CD.
2	ruthless.com	1998	ISBN 0-425-16570-1	In 2000, when American businessman Roger Gordian refuses to sell his sophisticated encryption program to foreign companies, he suddenly finds his company the object of a corporate takeover – and to say it's hostile doesn't even come close. Gordian is the only man who stands between the nation's military software and a powerful circle of drug lords and political extremists who want to put Roger Gordian – and the rest of the free world – out of business for good...	Also made into a video game of the same name.
3	Shadow Watch	1999	ISBN 0-425-17188-4	It's 2001, and American businessman Roger Gordian has extended his reach into space. His company has become the principal contractor in the design and manufacture of Orion, a multinational space station. But the Orion project has been targeted by international terrorist Harlan DeVane, whose criminal enterprises thrive on violence and political instability.	Also made into a video game of the same name.
4	Bio-Strike	2000	ISBN 0-425-17735-1	In 2001, criminal mastermind Harlan DeVane has developed – and spread – a deadly, genetically engineered "superbug" resistant to all known cures. DeVane plans to auction off the triggering elements to the highest bidder, but first he'll use them to destroy the greatest threat to his operations: Roger Gordian, head of Uplink Technologies.	
5	Cold War	2001	ISBN 0-425-18214-2	In this novel, an UpLink Mars rover team goes "missing" in a storm. Pete Nimec is sent to oversee the search and rescue when the Antarctic base comes under attack.	
6	Cutting Edge	2002	ISBN 0-425-18705-5	For UpLink International and Roger Gordian, the Pan-African fiber-optic ring is his most ambitious – and expensive – endeavor to date. His nemesis, Harlan DeVane, is penetrating the network to gain unlimited access to a most valuable product: information. To ensure his success, DeVane kidnaps Gordian's daughter. Now, Gordian must trust his UpLink team as never before, as they fight on land and sea to save his daughter and turn the tables against DeVane...	
7	Zero Hour	2003	ISBN 0-425-19291-1	In this novel, a radical Pakistan-based terrorist group attempts to use a powerful laser to release a deadly acid vapor cloud over New York City, using gems from Southeast Asia. There is a reference to the author in one of the conversations.	
8	Wild Card	2004	ISBN 0-425-19911-8	In this novel, Pete Nimec is sent on a "vacation" to a resort on the Island of Trinidad and Tobago. What he finds is a corrupt oil company attempting to sell oil to two of the United States' deadliest enemies: North Korea and Cuba.	
