= Tom Clancy's Ghost Recon =

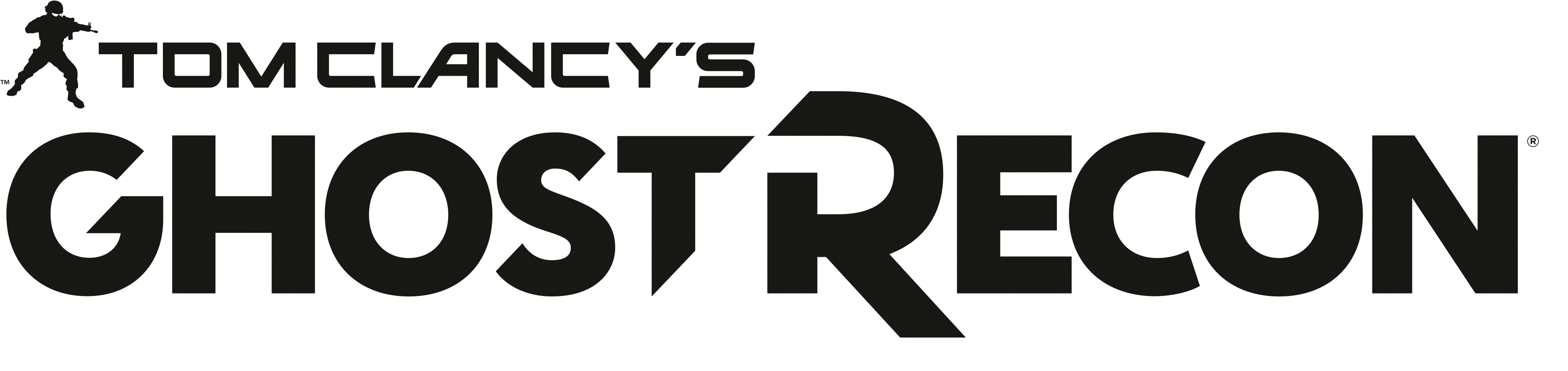
- Genre: Tactical shooter
- Developers: Red Storm Entertainment; Ubisoft Paris; Ubisoft Milan
- Publisher: Ubisoft
- Platforms: Microsoft Windows, Mac OS, Xbox, PlayStation 2, GameCube, Xbox 360, PlayStation 3, PlayStation Portable, Wii, Nintendo 3DS, PlayStation 4, Xbox One, Stadia
- First release: Tom Clancy's Ghost Recon; 13 November 2001
- Latest release: Tom Clancy's Ghost Recon Breakpoint; 4 October 2019

Tom Clancy's Ghost Recon is a series of military tactical shooter video games published by Ubisoft. In the series, the player is in charge of a fictional, newly conceived squad of U.S. Army Special Forces soldiers from Delta Company, 1st Battalion, 5th Special Forces Group (5th SFG) stationed at Fort Bragg. Except for the "1st Battalion, 5th SFG" designation, this reconnaissance unit is entirely fictional, as Special Forces Battalions currently only support three Companies (A, B and C). They are often referred to as "the Ghosts". Their role is like other real world special operations forces, in that their operations are kept highly classified. In Tom Clancy's Ghost Recon: Future Soldier, it is shown that the Ghost's unit has multiple designations and is part of JSOC; they are also known as the Group for Specialized Tactics (or GST—where the term "Ghost" comes from), much like real JSOC units such as Delta Force (1st SFOD-D or CAG) and SEAL Team Six (or DEVGRU). Tom Clancy's Ghost Recon has also been novelized by Grant Blackwood under the pseudonym David Michaels. As of 2025, over 40 million units have been sold.

== Games ==
Aggregate review scores
Game	Metacritic
Tom Clancy's Ghost Recon (2001)	(GC) 59/100 (PC) 80/100 (PS2) 63/100 (Xbox) 84/100
Tom Clancy's Ghost Recon: Desert Siege	(PC) 82/100
Tom Clancy's Ghost Recon: Island Thunder	(PC) 82/100 (Xbox) 81/100
Tom Clancy's Ghost Recon: Jungle Storm	(PS2) 70/100
Tom Clancy's Ghost Recon 2	(GC) 54/100 (PS2) 58/100 (Xbox) 80/100
Tom Clancy's Ghost Recon 2: Summit Strike	(Xbox) 84/100
Tom Clancy's Ghost Recon Advanced Warfighter	(PC) 80/100 (PS2) 44/100 (Xbox) 66/100 (X360) 90/100
Tom Clancy's Ghost Recon Advanced Warfighter 2	(PC) 76/100 (PS3) 84/100 (PSP) 61/100 (X360) 86/100
Tom Clancy's Ghost Recon Predator	(PSP) 54/100
Tom Clancy's Ghost Recon (2010)	(Wii) 46/100
Tom Clancy's Ghost Recon: Shadow Wars	(3DS) 77/100
Tom Clancy's Ghost Recon: Future Soldier	(PC) 71/100 (PS3) 79/100 (X360) 79/100
Tom Clancy's Ghost Recon Phantoms	(PC) 70/100
Tom Clancy's Ghost Recon Wildlands	(PC) 69/100 (PS4) 70/100 (XONE) 76/100
Tom Clancy's Ghost Recon Breakpoint	(PC) 57/100 (PS4) 55/100 (XONE) 62/100

=== Tom Clancy's Ghost Recon (2001) ===
Tom Clancy's Ghost Recon begins in April 2008, with civil unrest taking place in Russia. Ultra-nationalists have seized power with plans to rebuild the Soviet Union. Their first step is clandestine support of rebel forces in Georgia and the Baltic states. Alarmed by the threat, the U.S. deploys the Ghosts into Georgia to stop the Russians. Over the course of the campaign, the Ghosts take the fight to the ultra-nationalists, with a final showdown in Moscow's Red Square.

==== Tom Clancy's Ghost Recon: Desert Siege (2002) ====
Set in 2009, after the first game, Tom Clancy's Desert Siege features a new campaign in East Africa, where the Ghosts have been deployed to stop Ethiopian army Colonel Tesfaye Wolde's plans to invade Eritrea. He executes his plan through arms sales with the same Russian ultra-nationalists who launched the coup the previous year.

==== Tom Clancy's Ghost Recon: Island Thunder (2002) ====
The second expansion set to Tom Clancy's Ghost Recon, Tom Clancy's Ghost Recon: Island Thunder takes place in Cuba in 2010. Its plot revolves around Cuba's first democratic elections since the 1950s, but an anti-American faction named the FDP (El Frente Democratico del Pueblo or People's Democratic Front), secretly terrorizes election outlets during the campaign while fielding their own presidential candidate. The Ghosts, who are sent to ensure order during the elections, discover that the FDP is a shell organization run by a Colombian drug cartel that needs the island as a transit point to the United States.

==== Tom Clancy's Ghost Recon: Jungle Storm (2004) ====
Taking place in Bogotá, Colombia just after the events of Island Thunder, the drug cartel that had aided and financed the FDP in their efforts in Cuba has initiated a number of terrorist attacks against the Colombian government, who have allied themselves with the United States. After Colombia's call for help following an attack on a U.S. embassy, America responds by deploying the Ghosts to restore order and put the cartel out of business.

=== Tom Clancy's Ghost Recon 2 (2004) ===
Tom Clancy's Ghost Recon 2 is set in the Korean Peninsula. The settings of the PlayStation 2 and GameCube versions (both of which are labeled 2007: First Contact) are linked with Splinter Cell: Chaos Theory, particularly the sinking of the fictional intelligence-gathering vessel Clarence E. Walsh. They depict a new Korean War brought about by a renegade Korean People's Army general, Jung Chong-sun, who launches a coup against the North Korean government. The Xbox version is the direct sequel of the two games, in which Jung plots revenge against NATO and South Korea. Ghost Recon 2 also marks the debut of the series' main character, Capt Scott Mitchell.

==== Tom Clancy's Ghost Recon 2: Summit Strike (2005) ====
An Afghan Uzbak warlord and arms dealer named Rahil carries out an assassination of Kazakhstan's president and Security Council, triggering a crisis where the Kazakh military splinters and vies for control. The U.S. sends the Ghosts to aid UN troops and loyalist Kazakh forces to restore order and capture Rahil.

=== Tom Clancy's Ghost Recon: Advanced Warfighter (2006) ===
Often identified by the acronym GRAW, the game takes place over the course of 72 hours in 2013, beginning in Mexico City. The plot revolves around Mitchell's efforts to rescue U.S. President Ballantine from Mexican rebels, destroy a secret communications device that they captured, and prevent a launch of the United States' nuclear arsenal. The game is mostly known for its new combat mechanics, new weapons, and next-generation graphics.

=== Tom Clancy's Ghost Recon: Advanced Warfighter 2 (2007) ===
The game is again set south of the United States border in 2014, immediately after the events of Tom Clancy's Ghost Recon: Advanced Warfighter and again deals with the conflict between a Mexican rebel group, Mexican loyalists, and the U.S. Army for a time span of 72 hours. A wide array of location types are included, featuring mountains, small towns, urban environments, and a large hydro-electric dam just north of the U.S.-Mexico border. This game, as well as Rainbow Six: Vegas, has been noted for rectifying squad artificial intelligence problems that the series has been afflicted with.

=== Tom Clancy's Ghost Recon: Predator (2010) ===
Released for the PlayStation Portable, Predator takes place in Sri Lanka, which is the target of a U.S. invasion force aiming to destroy a rebel group. The plot focuses on the Ghosts being sent to uncover and stop a plot to draw the U.S. into a larger war.

=== Tom Clancy's Ghost Recon (2010) ===
The first title in the franchise released for the Wii.

=== Tom Clancy's Ghost Recon: Shadow Wars (2011) ===
Created for the Nintendo 3DS, Shadow Wars is a turn-based tactics game featuring various soldier classes on different battlefields.

=== Tom Clancy's Ghost Recon: Future Soldier (2012) ===
Set in 2024, Future Soldier features a new team of Ghosts taking on a Russian criminal syndicate that takes power in Russia. Players will also have a chance to use advanced near-future military technology such as optic camouflage and also customize their weapons to a greater degree than the system in GRAW.

=== Tom Clancy's Ghost Recon: Commander (2012) ===
Tom Clancy's Ghost Recon: Commander is a Facebook game developed by Loot Drop and designed by John Romero and Brenda Brathwaite. The game was cancelled only five months after launch. This resulted in the development team being laid off.

=== Tom Clancy's Ghost Recon: Phantoms (2014) ===
A defunct multiplayer-only free-to-play game, Phantoms did feature third-person combat between teams of players using one of three soldier classes. It was originally designed for Windows and the Wii U, but development issues prompted an exclusive focus for the PC platform.

=== Tom Clancy's Ghost Recon: Wildlands (2017) ===
Tom Clancy's Ghost Recon Wildlands is an open world tactical shooter video game developed by Ubisoft Paris. It is the tenth installment in the Tom Clancy's Ghost Recon franchise and is the first Ghost Recon game to feature an open world environment. The game moves away from the futuristic setting introduced in Tom Clancy's Ghost Recon Advanced Warfighter and instead feature a setting similar to the original Tom Clancy's Ghost Recon. Ubisoft described it as one of the biggest open world games that they have ever published, with the game world including a wide variety of environments such as mountains, forests, deserts and salt flats. The game was released in 2017 for Microsoft Windows, PlayStation 4 and Xbox One.

=== Tom Clancy's Ghost Recon: Breakpoint (2019) ===
Tom Clancy's Ghost Recon Breakpoint is a tactical shooter video game developed by Ubisoft Paris. It is the eleventh installment in the Tom Clancy's Ghost Recon franchise and a sequel to Wildlands.

=== Tom Clancy's Ghost Recon: Frontline (Cancelled) ===
Tom Clancy's Ghost Recon Frontline was supposed to be a free-to-play, tactical-action, massive PVP shooter grounded in the Ghost Recon universe. Frontline would have featured an advanced class system and large set of tactical support tools allowing for complete freedom in strategic gameplay, with multiple ways to outsmart enemy teams and win every fight. The game would have been available to play on Windows PC, Xbox One, Xbox Series X/S, PS4, PS5, and Stadia, with crossplay enabled between all platforms. In July 2022, Ubisoft announced that it had canceled the project.

== Reception ==
Global sales of the Ghost Recon series had surpassed 5 million units by April 2004 and 40 million units by 2025.

== Novel ==
The novel by David Michaels follows CPT Scott Mitchell and Ghost team on a mission in China. Their task is to search for the Spring Tiger Group—a band of rogue Chinese military officers—and put an end to its attempt at seizing control of Taiwan and sparking a massive armed conflict in the Pacific Ocean. The novel was released on 4 November 2008 by Berkley Books. The other 3 novels were also released. Combat Ops, released on 29 March 2011, saw Mitchell and his GR team as they go on the hunt for the terrorist leader somewhere in Afghanistan. In Choke Point, written by Peter Telep and released on 31 December 2012, the US ambassador to Colombia was kidnapped and it is up to Andrew Ross and his team to rescue him. Finally, in Dark Waters, written by Richard Dansky and released on 7 March 2017, Nomad and his team are sent to Venezuela to rescue several hostages.

== Other media ==
=== Direct-to-video release ===
A short film based on the series, titled Tom Clancy's Ghost Recon: ALPHA aired on G4 on 3 May 2012. The short film was released on Blu-ray and DVD on 22 May 2012. The film is a prequel to Ghost Recon: Future Soldier.

=== Film adaptation ===
Ubisoft confirmed that a Ghost Recon film was planned as were films based on Assassin's Creed and Tom Clancy's Splinter Cell. On 11 June 2013, it was reported that Warner Bros. Pictures and Platinum Dunes would be making the film and Michael Bay would serve as a producer and director, while by Matthew Federman and Stephen Scaia would write the script.
