= List of cancelled PlayStation 5 games =

The PlayStation 5 is a home video game console launched by Sony Interactive Entertainment in 2020 as the successor to the PlayStation 4, and as one of the inaugural platforms within the ninth generation of video game consoles. The console has been released in multiple variants throughout its lifetime, including a slimmer redesign as well as a more powerful iteration, the PlayStation 5 Pro. Despite initially encountering commercial difficulties due to a global semiconductor shortage resulting from the COVID-19 pandemic, the console was declared as Sony's biggest PlayStation platform launch within two weeks of its release, ultimately shipping 84.2 million units worldwide as of November 2025. This list documents games that were in development for PlayStation 5 at various points in its history, but either didn't release in any capacity or were reconfigured in production.

== Games ==
There are currently 18 games on this list. (Note: This number is always up to date by this script.)

Title(s)	Notes/Reasons	Developer	Publisher
Bloodborne remake	In February 2026, it was reported by Bloomberg News that Bluepoint Games had successfully pitched a remake of the PlayStation 4 title Bloodborne (2015) to Sony in early 2025, making it their second remake of a FromSoftware game following the PlayStation 5 launch title Demon's Souls (2020). However, FromSoftware themselves turned the project down.	Bluepoint Games	Sony Interactive Entertainment
Football Manager 25	The 2025 iteration of the yearly Football Manager franchise was delayed twice before eventually being cancelled outright. The developers cited internal concerns about its quality, and that any further delays would move it too far the past the start of the current football season. The team instead decided to cancel the game in favor of focusing on the 2026 iteration.	Sports Interactive	Sega
Gears of War: E-Day	In early June 2026, a release for the title on the console was both listed in ratings by the European PEGI content rating board, as well as retail databases for outlets such as Walmart, suggesting that the game was prepared for release as part of Xbox's efforts in multiplatform distribution which also included Gears of War Reloaded on Sony's platform the previous year. At the Xbox Games Showcase, the publisher announced that the game would instead remain exclusive to Windows and Xbox Series X/S from release on October 6, 2026, as they began pivoting back towards traditional first-party exclusive games following the departure of the prior Microsoft Gaming regime. Xbox CEO Asha Sharma later confirmed that E-Day would be a permanent exclusive to the platform as opposed to following the timed model of other first-party titles.	The Coalition	Xbox Game Studios
Untitled God of War multiplayer game	In October 2025, images leaked online from a multiplayer spin-off in the God of War franchise that was to be developed by Bluepoint Games. The screenshots inferred a return to the Greek mythology backdrop of the original God of War trilogy and the implied return of the villain Hades. Sony had previously ended work on an unspecified Bluepoint Games project in early 2025.	Bluepoint Games	Sony Interactive Entertainment
Hyenas	A multiplayer-focused first-person shooter game announced in 2022. It was cited as Sega's most expensive game ever made, with a budget that surpassed the US$70 million spent on Shenmue in 1999. Sega called it one of their "Super Games" that was pivotal to the publisher's future, expressing hope that it would recoup the investment put towards the title. After several alpha tests conducted throughout the next year, Sega remained unhappy with the game's progress and reception, sending more of its in-house staff to Creative Assembly to closely supervise development. In 2023, they cited the game's production as "challenging" and were looking into adjustments for its monetization model, including a potential pivot towards being a free-to-play game. Sega officially canceled the title in September 2023, attributing it towards a lack of potential profitability in Europe. An anonymous developer from Creative Assembly later alleged a lack of direction, paired with the risk of releasing an unoriginal game in an overly saturated market, as contributing to the decision to end Hyenas' development.	Creative Assembly	Sega
The Last of Us Online	Originally beginning development as a multiplayer mode for The Last of Us Part II (2020) similar to the first game's Factions, Naughty Dog creative lead Neil Druckmann and co-lead game designer Emilia Schatz announced in 2019 that the multiplayer component would not be timed to release with the game in 2020, with the developer separately confirming that such work would continue separately. Druckmann revealed more details at Summer Game Fest 2021 in June, including its conversion into a standalone game project that was "as big" as Naughty Dog's single-player titles, focusing on completely new characters in a separate area within the United States. Production on the title persisted until being scaled back in 2023 as Sony reassessed its direction and subsidiary Bungie evaluated the game, expressing concern that it would not be able to sustain long-term player engagement. The game was canceled in December 2023, with Naughty Dog citing its ambitious scale and an unwillingness to shift pivotal resources away from upcoming single-player projects such as Intergalactic: The Heretic Prophet.	Naughty Dog	Sony Interactive Entertainment
Lego Disney	A report from NintendoLife in March 2023 revealed that according to sources close to its development, TT Games had conceived a Lego video game that would've featured an ensemble of characters derived from various Disney properties similar to the Disney Infinity franchise, codenamed "Project Marley." The game was scrapped due to perceived similarities with Disney Dreamlight Valley (2023), which released to critical and commercial success later that year.	Traveller's Tales / The Lego Group	Warner Bros. Games
Lego Guardians of the Galaxy	A report from NintendoLife in March 2023 alleged that according to sources close to its development, TT Games had previously canceled a Lego video game adaptation of the Marvel Comics characters, the Guardians of the Galaxy, which had been in development for eighteen months under the codename "Project Cosmic."	Traveller's Tales / The Lego Group	Warner Bros. Games
Untitled London Studio game	Sony announced an online multiplayer game in development by London Studio in October 2022, under the codename "Project Camden." The game would've been set in a fictionalized London hybridizing traditional fantasy and contemporary aesthetics with an emphasis on cooperative gameplay. The game was officially canceled in conjunction with the permanent closure of the developer in February 2024. Soon after, a group of former London Studio developers regrouped to found independent studio Twisted Works. Many concepts from their prior work at Sony would be resurfaced in their upcoming debut title Cast Outs, currently in development and slated to release for PlayStation 5, Windows and Xbox Series X/S.	London Studio	Sony Interactive Entertainment
Mirror Pond	By June 2021, Bend Studio had begun developing an open world live service game built on the gameplay systems introduced in their single-player title Days Gone. The game was canceled by Sony in January 2025, leading to the studio laying off 30% of its staff at that time. In February 2026, the game's working title of Mirror Pond was leaked alongside development footage sourced from the showreel of a former animator at the studio, revealing the game to be a third-person shooter with military-grade weaponry.	Bend Studio	Sony Interactive Entertainment
Prince of Persia: The Sands of Time remake	A remake of Prince of Persia: The Sands of Time was originally in development by Ubisoft Mumbai and Ubisoft Pune, and announced in 2020 for eighth-generation consoles and PC for release the following year. After subsequent criticism for the game's visuals, the game was delayed to 2022, and was soon postponed indefinitely to address feedback. In May 2022, production on the title was internally rebooted with Ubisoft Montreal taking over responsibilities. In November 2023, the Prince of Persia series' social media accounts announced that development was progressing smoothly after reaching a significant internal milestone. The game was re-revealed under its original title at Ubisoft Forward in June 2024, where it was slated for a 2026 launch. In January that year, Ubisoft announced the game was among multiple that had been cancelled as part of a wider organizational restructuring at the publisher.	Ubisoft Montreal	Ubisoft
Redfall	A multiplayer-focused open-world first-person shooter game developed by Arkane Austin and released in May 2023 for Windows and Xbox Series X/S. During a preview event for the game in March, creative director Harvey Smith confirmed to IGN that the title was initially slated to release on PlayStation 5, but development on said version was canceled at Microsoft's request following their acquisition of ZeniMax Media, the parent company of Arkane Austin, in March 2021.	Arkane Austin	Bethesda Softworks
Marvel's Spider-Man: The Great Web	A ransomware attack on developer Insomniac Games in December 2023 revealed that they had internally pitched a multiplayer entry in the Marvel's Spider-Man series inspired by the "Spider-Verse" comics and concept. Described as "Spider-Man meets GTA Online" in pitch documents, the game would've had players selecting from a roster of alternate Spider-People to complete various missions and daily challenges in an open-world New York City. Like other live service games, The Great Web was to be supported by a Battle Pass providing quarterly seasons of additional content such as new story chapters.	Insomniac Games	Sony Interactive Entertainment
Tom Clancy's Ghost Recon Frontline	Originally announced in 2021, the game was to be a first-person massively multiplayer online PvP class-based tactical shooter battle royale game. An alpha test was originally scheduled to take place shortly after its unveiling, but was delayed indefinitely for undisclosed reasons. A closed beta was held in confidentiality in January 2022, although footage was quickly leaked on livestreaming sites such as Twitch, leading to backlash against the game's resemblance to Call of Duty: Warzone. Ubisoft canceled the title altogether in July 2022.	Ubisoft Bucharest, Ubisoft Kyiv	Ubisoft
Tom Clancy's The Division Heartland	Announced in 2021 as a free-to-play third person shooter title, it originated as a battle royale multiplayer mode for Tom Clancy's The Division 2 (2019), though pivoted to a "streamlined survival" focus. Playing Heartland would've also secured rewards in both The Division 2 and sister title Tom Clancy's The Division Resurgence. The game was revealed to have been canceled by Ubisoft during an earnings call in May 2024.	Red Storm Entertainment	Ubisoft
Untitled Twisted Metal game	An unannounced entry in the Twisted Metal franchise under the codename "Project Copper" was cancelled by Sony in early 2024 as part of a series of studio layoffs. It would've been a live-service title focused around third-person battle royale mechanics that was previously developed by third-party studio Lucid Games, whom Sony collaborated with on Destruction AllStars (2021), before being taken over by first-party team Firesprite later in production.	Firesprite	Sony Interactive Entertainment
Untitled Warner Bros. crossover game	According to a March 2023 report by GamesIndustry.biz, developer Traveller's Tales had previously been working on a shooter game codenamed "Project Rainbow Road," which was alleged to be a crossover between multiple Warner Bros. media properties such as DC Comics, Rick and Morty and external franchises like Stranger Things. It had already been canceled by the time of the report's publication, to allocate more resources for projects such as Lego Batman: Legacy of the Dark Knight (2026).	Traveller's Tales	Warner Bros. Games
WiLD	An open world survival game, which was originally in development and announced as a PlayStation 4 exclusive, suffered significant delays further compounded by original director Michel Ancel's retirement from the games industry in 2020. The game was never completed, despite Ancel iterating in December 2024 that editorial duties on the title were transferred from Wild Sheep to Ubisoft Paris, owing to his prior employment at the publisher, and that the former studio shifting the game to the PlayStation 5 proved to be its 'undoing.'	Wild Sheep Studio	Sony Interactive Entertainment
