= Tom Clancy's The Division Heartland =

Cancelled video game

- Developer(s): Red Storm Entertainment
- Publisher(s): Ubisoft
- Director(s): Keith Evans
- Producer(s): Tony Sturtzel
- Writer(s): Felix Dulay
- Series: Tom Clancy's The Division
- Engine: Snowdrop
- Platform(s): PlayStation 4 PlayStation 5 Windows; Xbox One; Xbox Series X/S
- Release: Cancelled
- Genre(s): Third-person shooter
- Mode(s): Multiplayer

Tom Clancy's The Division Heartland was a planned free-to-play third person shooter action game developed by Red Storm Entertainment and published by Ubisoft. It was set to be a standalone spin-off set in The Division universe. Heartland was set to be released for PlayStation 4, PlayStation 5, Windows, Xbox One, Xbox Series X/S, and Amazon Luna.

== Gameplay ==
Unlike the first two games in the series, Heartland would have been set in rural America and the fictional town of Silver Creek. The game would have featured two major game modes. The first mode, "Storm Operations", is a player-versus-player-versus-environment mode which can support a maximum of 45 players. In this mode, players would fend off against agents from a rogue faction known as the Vultures while surviving a virus. The second mode is named Excursion Operations, a player-versus-environment mode in which players would complete missions and collect loot/gear. At launch, the game would have featured three character classes (weapons expert, medic, or survivalist) and six playable characters.

In addition, the game would incorporate elements from survival games. For instance, players would need to manage their hydration level. Contamination Zones replaced the Dark Zones from previous games, with their locations always shifting. Players would need to use breathing filters in order to access these areas, but would receive much more valuable loot. The game also would feature a day-night cycle. The artificial intelligence of the enemies in the game would be more alert at night.

== Development ==
Red Storm Entertainment led the development of the free-to-play title, while RedLynx and Ubisoft Bucharest provided assistance. According to Keith Edwards, the game's creative director, Heartland would have featured "streamlined survival gameplay". It was originally created as a battle royale mode within Tom Clancy's The Division 2.

The game was officially announced in May 2021. It was set to be released for PlayStation 4, PlayStation 5, Windows, Xbox One, Xbox Series X/S, and Amazon Luna. By playing Heartland, players would also receive rewards in Tom Clancy's The Division 2 and the mobile game Tom Clancy's The Division Resurgence.

Multiple public tests were held after its announcement, but the game was also quietly delayed multiple times. Ubisoft announced its cancellation in an earnings release on May 15, 2024.
