= Snowdrop (game engine) =

Proprietary game engine

- Developers: Massive Entertainment; Ubisoft
- Written in: C++
- Platform: Windows; PlayStation 4; PlayStation 5; Xbox One; Xbox Series X/S; Nintendo Switch; Nintendo Switch 2; Stadia
- License: Proprietary
- Website: www.massive.se/project/snowdrop-engine/

Snowdrop (also known as Ubisoft Snowdrop) is a proprietary game engine created by Massive Entertainment and Ubisoft for use on Windows, PlayStation 4, PlayStation 5, Xbox One, Xbox Series X/S, Nintendo Switch, Nintendo Switch 2, Stadia, and Luna. It was revealed at E3 2013 with Tom Clancy's The Division, the first game using the engine. Snowdrop is one of the primary game engines used by Ubisoft along with Disrupt, Dunia, and Ubisoft Anvil.

== History ==
The engine is coded mainly in C++. Rodrigo Cortes, former brand art director at Massive Entertainment, said that development on the Snowdrop engine started in 2009. Initially it was an engine built for PC and next-gen development to "do things better not bigger". The core of the game engine is powered by a "node-based system" and the engine is a dynamic, interconnected and flexible system where developers can create their assets quickly and interact with them in ways that have never been done before. Massive created a lighting and destruction system inspired by film production techniques. Features of Snowdrop include advanced physically based rendering (PBR), procedural destruction, and a dynamic global illumination system.

According to the developers, the engine was designed with three pillars: Empowerment, which allows animators, artists and designers to get their work done quicker, Real Time, which allows developers to implement and iterate quickly and Fun, a concept that applies not only to the final product, but to using the engine during development. An improved version of the engine was used for Tom Clancy's The Division 2.

In February 2016, Massive confirmed that the engine can be used for other Ubisoft games. According to Martin Hultberg, head of IP at Ubisoft Massive, Snowdrop became available to all Ubisoft studios and not just those working on the Tom Clancy's IP. These games include South Park: The Fractured but Whole, Mario + Rabbids: Kingdom Battle, and Starlink: Battle for Atlas.

In May 2021, Ubisoft announced Tom Clancy's The Division Heartland which was developed on Snowdrop. However, three years later on 15 May 2024 Ubisoft announced that it had cancelled the game. In June 2021, Ubisoft confirmed that the engine will be upgraded for Avatar: Frontiers of Pandora. According to senior technical artist Kunal Luthra, thousands of assets can be propagated inside of each frame to create more highly detailed environments. The engine would also support real-time ray tracing, unified volumetric rendering, as well as improved AI behavior for NPCs.

Snowdrop was used for Star Wars Outlaws, which features RTX Direct Illumination and DLSS Ray Reconstruction. Massive developed its own digital "camera lens" in Snowdrop, which was used to give the game a more cinematic presentation as an option.

The remake of Tom Clancy's Splinter Cell will also use Snowdrop. The game will be a ground-up remake and development is headed by Ubisoft Toronto which had previously worked on Far Cry 6. Ubisoft announced they will continue to upscale and develop the engine.

== Games using Snowdrop ==
Year	Title	Platform(s)	Developer(s)	Ref.
2016	Tom Clancy's The Division	PlayStation 4, Windows, Xbox One	Massive Entertainment	
2017	Mario + Rabbids Kingdom Battle	Nintendo Switch	Ubisoft Milan	
2017	South Park: The Fractured but Whole	Nintendo Switch, PlayStation 4, Windows, Xbox One	Ubisoft San Francisco	
2018	Starlink: Battle for Atlas	Nintendo Switch, PlayStation 4, Windows, Xbox One	Ubisoft Toronto	
2019	Tom Clancy's The Division 2	PlayStation 4, Stadia, Windows, Xbox One	Massive Entertainment	
2022	Rabbids: Party of Legends	Nintendo Switch, PlayStation 4, Stadia, Windows, Xbox One	Ubisoft Chengdu	
2022	Rocksmith+	Android, iOS, PlayStation 4, PlayStation 5, Windows	Ubisoft San Francisco	
2022	Mario + Rabbids Sparks of Hope	Nintendo Switch	Ubisoft Milan	
2023	The Settlers: New Allies	Nintendo Switch, PlayStation 4, PlayStation 5, Windows, Xbox One, Xbox Series X/S	Ubisoft Düsseldorf	
2023	Avatar: Frontiers of Pandora	PlayStation 5, Windows, Xbox Series X/S	Massive Entertainment	
2024	XDefiant	PlayStation 5, Windows, Xbox Series X/S	Ubisoft San Francisco	
2024	Star Wars Outlaws	PlayStation 5, Windows, Xbox Series X/S, Nintendo Switch 2	Massive Entertainment	
2026	Rayman Legends Retold	PlayStation 5, Windows, Xbox Series X/S, Nintendo Switch 2	Ubisoft Montpellier	
2027	Heroes of Might and Magic III Remake	PlayStation 5, Windows, Xbox Series X/S	Ubisoft	
TBA	Tom Clancy's Splinter Cell: Remake	—N/a	Ubisoft Toronto	

=== Cancelled ===
- Tom Clancy's The Division Heartland
