= Star Wars Outlaws =

2024 video game

- Developer: Massive Entertainment (Note: Additional work by Lucasfilm Games and Ubisoft's Annecy, Bucharest, Chengdu, Milan, Montpellier, Paris, RedLynx, Shanghai, Stockholm, and Toronto studios)
- Publisher: Ubisoft
- Directors: Julian Gerighty; Mathias Karlson
- Producer: Lionel Le Dain
- Programmer: Tobias Carlsson
- Artist: Benedikt Podlesnigg
- Writer: Navid Khavari
- Composers: Wilbert Roget II; Jon Everist; Kazuma Jinnouchi
- Series: Star Wars
- Engine: Snowdrop
- Platforms: PlayStation 5; Windows; Xbox Series X/S; Nintendo Switch 2
- Release: PlayStation 5, Windows, Xbox Series X/S; August 30, 2024; Nintendo Switch 2; September 4, 2025
- Genre: Action-adventure
- Mode: Single-player

Star Wars Outlaws is a 2024 action-adventure game developed by Massive Entertainment and published by Ubisoft. Set in the Star Wars universe between the events of The Empire Strikes Back (1980) and Return of the Jedi (1983), the story follows Kay Vess, a young scoundrel who assembles a team for a massive heist in order to escape a crime syndicate. The game is played from a third-person perspective, with the player traversing an open world environment and engaging in various activities.

The development team, supported by Lucasfilm Games and ten other Ubisoft studios, sought to combine canonical elements of the Star Wars universe with their own ideas, focusing on creating cinematic and seamless gameplay. Humberly González provided the motion capture and voice for Kay, while Dee Bradley Baker voiced her companion, Nix.

Star Wars Outlaws was released for PlayStation 5, Windows, and Xbox Series X/S on August 30, 2024, and was released for Nintendo Switch 2 on September 4, 2025. The game received generally positive reviews from critics. In October 2024, Ubisoft reported sales of Star Wars Outlaws underperformed expectations.

== Gameplay ==
In the game, players can explore each planet while riding on a speeder bike.

Star Wars Outlaws is an action-adventure game played from a third-person perspective. The player controls the scoundrel Kay Vess (voiced by and modelled after Humberly González), traversing open world environments on planets and in space while engaging in various activities. The game features four explorable planets: Akiva, Kijimi, Tatooine, and Toshara. The planet Cantonica is also featured in certain story missions. Combat combines melee attacks and the use of a blaster, which has several firing modes, including an electromagnetic pulse. Kay can use environmental objects, such as explosive barrels, to her advantage. Kay has the Adrenaline ability, which charges during combat and triggers a time-slowing effect, allowing for a rapid series of shots at marked targets. She can also use stealth to sneak past or neutralize enemies. Kay's arsenal includes a grappling hook and an electronic hacking device. Her companion, a small creature named Nix, can scan the environment, interact with objects, and distract or attack enemies.

The player traverses planetary surfaces on a speeder bike and travels between planets aboard a starship called the Trailblazer. The player can also explore the orbits of planets and moons, as well as engage in space combat using the ship's weapons, including a laser cannon and missiles. Space stations provide hubs for trade and additional missions. By completing game activities, the player earns credits that can be used to purchase items and gear. As the game progresses, the player can upgrade Kay and Nix's abilities, along with enhancements for the blaster, speeder, and Trailblazer. The player can acquire new skills and upgrades by seeking out experts and completing their assignments.

In Outlaws, the player encounters four factions: the Ashiga Clan, Crimson Dawn, Hutt Cartel, and Pyke Syndicate. The player's decisions and actions throughout the game directly impact Kay's reputation with each. A high faction reputation grants access to locations, assignments, and discounts in faction shops. Conversely, a low reputation may result in factions dispatching mercenaries to pursue Kay. The game features a six-level wanted system that determines the intensity of Imperial forces' pursuit of Kay. The player can evade pursuit by hiding, bribing, or eliminating enemies. Additionally, the game features dialogue trees with answer choices that affect mission outcomes.

== Plot ==
Shortly after the Battle of Hoth, Sliro Barsha, leader of the upstart criminal syndicate Zerek Besh, murders the leaders of his rival syndicates to consolidate his power. Meanwhile, Kay Vess seeks a way to escape her homeworld of Cantonica and start a new life in the Core Worlds. Desperate, she takes up a job with a crew led by Dennion, who plan to break into Sliro's vault and steal his fortune. Kay successfully opens the vault, only to be surprised when Dennion's crew reveal themselves as part of the Rebel Alliance, and their real objective was to free their team leader, Asara Deyn, who Sliro was holding prisoner. Kay demands payment from Dennion but is shot by a stun blast and forced to escape on her own. Believing Kay is responsible for the break-in, Sliro puts a death mark on her head. Kay steals a ship called the Trailblazer and makes an emergency jump to the planet Toshara, but is forced to crash-land due to ship damage.

On Toshara, Kay meets Waka, a mechanic willing to repair the Trailblazer, but Kay has to do jobs for the local syndicates to earn the money to pay for the parts. As Kay gets the Trailblazer repaired and performs jobs for the local syndicates, she is soon forced to choose which syndicates to curry favor with, either assisting or betraying them at several opportunities. Eventually, she manages to salvage a replacement nav computer from a shipwreck, only to be double-crossed by Waka; he is then killed by the bounty hunter Vail Tormin, who is after Kay's death mark. Kay is saved by outlaw Jaylen Vrax and his droid enforcer ND-5. Jaylen asks Kay to help break into Sliro's vault again to steal his fortune and instructs her to gather the crew needed to pull off the heist.

Kay and ND-5 then travel around the galaxy to recruit crew members. On Kijimi, she frees their safecracker, Ank Parako, from the clutches of the Ashiga Clan. On Tatooine, she searches for their heavy, Hoss, but they, along with Vail, run afoul of Jabba the Hutt. Hoss is killed while Kay and Vail are forced to work together to escape, with both women earning each other's respect. On Akiva, she searches for the droidsmith Gedeek Obaz and helps him hijack the Empire's Viper Droid project for the Rebel Alliance to secure his loyalty. However, before they can recruit a slicer, ND-5 begins to malfunction as its power core fails. Kay and Gedeek enter an abandoned Separatist factory only to run into Asara's Rebel cell. ND-5 is repaired, and Asara decides to join the crew as their heavy. Jaylen also recruits Riko Vess, an expert slicer and Kay's estranged mother, who abandoned her as a child.

Despite her reluctance to work with Riko, Kay continues the plan by stealing Sliro's master code and discovers that Sliro is a director of the Imperial Security Bureau and that Zerek Besh is merely a front for the organization. She then leads the team in breaking into Sliro's vault. However, it's revealed to be a trap, and Sliro corners Kay in the vault and orders Vail to kill her. Instead, Vail turns on Sliro, knocking him unconscious and holding off his guards in return for loot. Kay and her team manage to escape the planet, but she finds out what they stole wasn't Sliro's money, but a codex containing all of his information about the Empire. Jaylen then betrays Kay and Asara, revealing his aim was to usurp Sliro and take control of Zerek Besh. He then forces ND-5 to stun Kay and locks her on the Trailblazer while taking Asara prisoner.

With Riko's help, Ank and Gedeek rescue Kay, who learns the Trailblazer is now aboard the Imperial Star Destroyer Revelator. Wanting to rescue ND-5, Kay infiltrates a meeting between Sliro, Jaylen, and Darth Vader. Vader agrees to let Jaylen take control of Zerek Besh, and Jaylen reveals that he is Sliro's older brother before killing him in revenge for betraying and hunting down their family. Kay manages to remove ND-5's restraining bolt, and he kills Jaylen to protect Kay. Kay, ND-5, and Asara escape the Revelator with the Codex. With the assistance of Asara's Rebels and the syndicate Kay has the best relations with, they destroy the Revelator and escape. Afterward, Asara returns to the Rebel Alliance with critical data from the Codex; Ank and Gedeek decide to work together on casino heists; Vail is paid off with a copy of the Codex; and Kay and ND-5 leave for their next adventure.

In a post-credits scene, a disguised Kay helps Riko escape an Imperial prison.

=== Wild Card ===
Kay is contacted by Toshara's Imperial Governor Thorden and told to secretly enter a Sabacc tournament on an underworld luxury cruise ship; he blackmails her with a fabricated hologram of herself as an Imperial that would ruin her reputation in the underworld. She is to win the game's main prize, a valuable moon called Okala V. However, before she can do so, Thorden has mercenaries attack and steal the map. Returning to Toshara, Kay and Lando Calrissian develop a plan to infiltrate Thorden's secret base and steal it back, thereby thwarting his plan to use the moon's resources to create a weaponized gas for the event of the Empire's eventual downfall. While Lando distracts Thorden, Kay infiltrates his vault and steals both the map and the fabricated hologram. Afterward, Lando pays Kay for the map and cautions her to watch for when the Empire eventually falls.

=== A Pirate's Fortune ===
After a mysterious message about a legendary pirate treasure in the Kephi system is played on the Trailblazer, Kay convinces ND-5 to investigate; however, their ship is unprepared for the system's ionized fog, and they are captured by the Rokana Raiders, a local band of pirates. Imprisoned, Kay meets the man behind the message, Hondo Ohnaka, who helps her escape. Teaming up, they decide to steal the treasure from the Raiders. They retrieve one half of the key to open the Vault and confront the Raiders' leader, Stinger Tash, who has the other half. Depending on dialogue choices, the crew either commits mutiny against Stinger and follows Hondo, who refuses to open the Vault, realizing its contents, ancient Battle Droids, are too dangerous, or Stinger opens the Vault and the crew is attacked and killed by the droids. Regardless of the choice, Hondo and Kay have to escape the Vault empty-handed, and ND-5 saves them.

== Production ==
At E3 2018, David Polfeldt, then-CEO of Ubisoft's Massive Entertainment, expressed interest in working on projects based on Disney franchises, including Star Wars, during discussions with Disney representatives. Disney had already included the studio on their shortlist of developers they wanted to collaborate with. Meanwhile, Massive, eager to move beyond the games as a service model used in their previous titles, sought to expand their creative opportunities. In 2020, the studio pitched a "scoundrel fantasy" concept to Lucasfilm Games, a subsidiary of Disney's Lucasfilm, envisioning a seamless open world gameplay. The idea was well-received by Lucasfilm, leading to the development of Star Wars Outlaws. This marked the first Star Wars project developed without Electronic Arts' involvement since Disney's 2013 agreement granting the company exclusive rights to produce Star Wars games.

A team of approximately 600 developers from eleven Ubisoft studios, including Massive, participated in the development of Outlaws. It was led by creative director Julian Gerighty, known for his work on Tom Clancy's The Division (2016) and its 2019 sequel, along with game director Mathias Karlson. They were joined by narrative director Navid Khavari, whose previous projects included Far Cry 5 (2018) and Far Cry 6 (2021), and lead writer Nikki Foy, known for Watch Dogs: Legion (2020) and downloadable content for Far Cry 6. Lucasfilm Games provided additional support. The team aimed to integrate canonical Star Wars elements with their own ideas, adhering to the design principles of Ralph McQuarrie, (Note: McQuarrie's principles are "strong silhouettes, the Three Second Rule (regarding how long it takes a viewer to understand what they're seeing), and injecting or maintaining the personality of characters, locales, vehicles, and so on.") the conceptual designer for the original trilogy. Their research encompassed a range of Star Wars media, including animated series and books. Furthermore, the developers drew inspiration from the sources that influenced George Lucas, such as spaghetti Westerns, the works of Akira Kurosawa, and classic war films, in addition to McQuarrie's concept art, Joe Johnston's storyboards, and Phil Tippett's creature designs.

Lucasfilm proposed the time gap between The Empire Strikes Back (1980) and Return of the Jedi (1983) as the setting for Outlaws. This period was deemed a "perfect starting point" as it allowed the story to shift away from the Rebel Alliance and instead focus on the criminal underworld, a subject not deeply explored in the franchise before. (Note: Star Wars 1313 by LucasArts and Project Ragtag by Visceral Games had a similar synopsis but were canceled in 2013 and 2017, respectively.) In the early stages of development, Massive compiled a list of planets for the game, including established Star Wars planets like Kijimi and new locations like Toshara, which was inspired by African savannas, particularly those of Tanzania. Despite the challenges presented by the existing Star Wars material about the planet, the team also decided to incorporate Tatooine. They relied on Dorling Kindersley's Star Wars visual guides to recreate the city of Mos Eisley and the planet's distinctive dunes and canyons.

The studio aimed to present the protagonist, Kay Vess, as a "resourceful underdog," contrasting with the trained soldier archetype seen in their The Division series. Star Wars characters such as Han Solo and Lando Calrissian, along with characters from other franchises like Jack Sparrow, Indiana Jones, and James Bond, influenced Kay's persona. At the same time, the developers wanted to make Kay more relatable by emphasizing her inexperience. Gerighty stated that Kay's story arc was a coming-of-age journey, transforming her from a "street thief to a fully-fledged scoundrel who is well known and kind of respected and feared by the syndicates." Martin Scorsese's 1985 film After Hours served as one of the inspirations for Kay's storyline. Her appearance, including her clothing and physical attributes like her broken nose and scars, was designed to visually convey her life experiences.

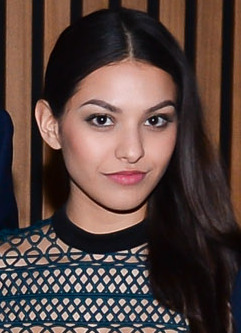
Humberly González

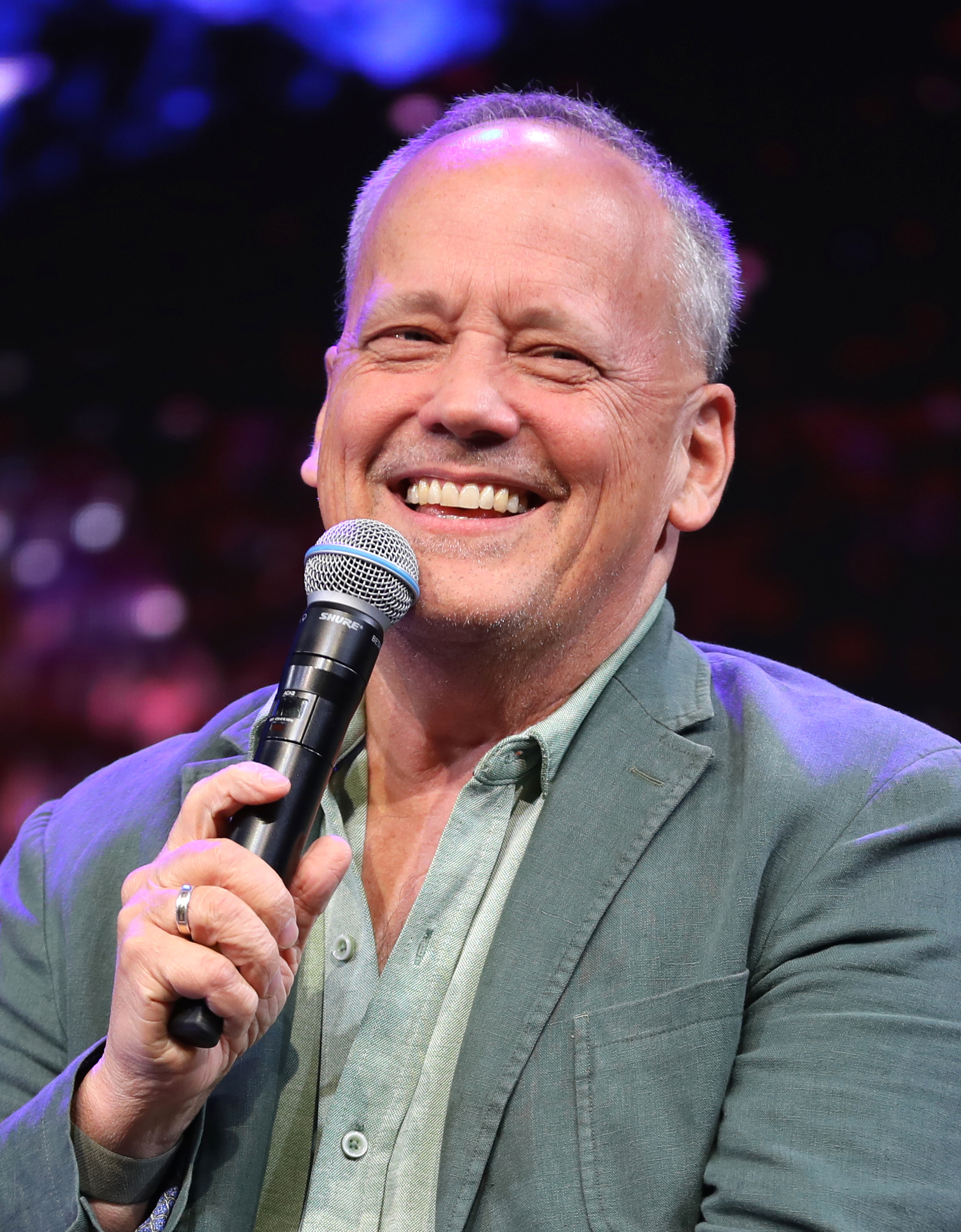
Dee Bradley Baker

González and Baker portrayed the main characters, Kay Vess and Nix, respectively.

Massive and Lucasfilm introduced the merqaal, a new species to the franchise, with Kay's companion, Nix, being one of them. The developers envisioned Kay and Nix as the main characters, emphasizing their synergy. Their goal was to integrate them organically with existing franchise characters while avoiding fan service. Humberly González provided both the motion capture and voice for Kay, while Dee Bradley Baker voiced Nix. González had previously worked with Ubisoft on Far Cry 6, and Baker is known for his numerous roles in Star Wars media, including the animated series The Clone Wars (2008–14, 2020) and The Bad Batch (2021–2024). Gerighty stated that González was chosen for her ability to embody the multifaceted nature of Kay's character.

The team aimed to create gameplay that felt cinematic and seamless. They sought to evoke a "matinee action" atmosphere and employed visual techniques such as vignetting, film grain, lens effects, and ultrawide resolution, drawing inspiration from the visual style of Rogue One (2016). The developers focused on creating the game's open world that expanded gradually and felt "conscious," rather than simply being large in scale. Its design was particularly inspired by Ghost of Tsushima (2020). The team aimed to create combat that offered diverse tactical approaches, avoiding a narrow focus on "precisely taking cover and taking headshots." Gerighty said that they wanted to convey the experience of a clever scoundrel rather than a trained soldier. To enhance Nix's usefulness as a companion, the developers drew inspiration from lemurs and monkeys, granting Nix abilities like object manipulation. They also incorporated reptilian features to highlight Nix's "tough side" and reflect the character's corresponding skills. The speeder movement was inspired by motocross. To develop space combat, Massive collaborated with other Ubisoft studios experienced in arcade flight and combat simulators. Their goal was to make starship controls intuitive while fostering deeper, more intense space combat through a slower pace. The space aspects were inspired by both Starlink: Battle for Atlas (2018) and the space sequence in Call of Duty: Advanced Warfare (2014).

Outlaws was developed using the Snowdrop engine, which had been enhanced to support Massive's three core design pillars: densely populated, dynamic cities; expansive landscapes with various activities; and outer space exploration. The developers chose to handcraft each game environment, deciding against using procedural generation. The visual design was inspired by the aesthetics of the 1970s and 1980s, which Gerighty described as "timeless." For instance, Kay's simplistic starship design drew inspiration from 1970s toys. Kay's speeder was modeled after a Swedish motocross bike, featuring a simplified and retrofuturistic style. Nix's design combined features of the developers' pets with those of wild animals such as armadillos and axolotls. To capture Nix's movements, a puppet was used, while the character's 3D model used shaders that mimicked latex. When developing accessibility options, the team collaborated with players with disabilities, consultants, and conducted user research. They also worked closely with Descriptive Video Works to implement audio description for cutscenes, making Outlaws the first Ubisoft game to feature this. The game offers 60 accessibility options, including audio cues, visual aids, and customizable controls.

== Marketing and release ==
Following an initial announcement in January 2021, Star Wars Outlaws was revealed at the Xbox Games Showcase in June 2023.

In April 2024, two special editions were announced. Both editions include a season pass featuring a bonus story mission, cosmetics, and future story expansions, with one edition offering an additional cosmetics. Pre-orders for the editions, priced at $110 and $130 respectively, launched simultaneously, offering vehicle cosmetics and granting early access to the game several days before its official release. The pricing and content of these editions drew criticism from some members of the gaming community.

That same month, Ubisoft announced a partnership with Intel to bundle the game with select 14th generation Raptor Lake processors. It was also bundled with the purchase of select Nvidia GeForce RTX 40 series GPUs. In June, journalists were given a hands-on demonstration at Summer Game Fest.

Star Wars Outlaws went gold in July 2024. The game was released for PlayStation 5, Windows (via the Epic Games Store and Ubisoft Connect), and Xbox Series X/S on August 30, 2024. The PC version, along with the Wild Card DLC expansion, debuted on Steam on November 21, 2024, but immediately faced challenges in attracting players, with a peak of just 834 concurrent users. The A Pirate's Fortune DLC expansion was released on May 15, 2025. The game was released for Nintendo Switch 2 on September 4, 2025.

In addition to the 2 released DLCs released there were rumours from a supposed insider of there being 4 more DLCs originally planned due to ubisoft believing there would be greater success with this game.

== Reception ==
=== Critical reception ===
Reception

Aggregate scores
Aggregator	Score
Metacritic	(PC) 77/100 (PS5) 75/100 (XSX) 76/100 (NS2) 81/100
OpenCritic	66%

Review scores
Publication	Score
Eurogamer	2/5
Famitsu	32/40
Game Informer	8.5/10
GameRevolution	8/10
GameSpot	6/10
GamesRadar+	3.5/5
Hardcore Gamer	2.5/5
IGN	7/10
NME	5/5
PC Gamer (US)	73/100
PCGamesN	5/10
Push Square	6/10
Shacknews	8/10
The Guardian	4/5
Video Games Chronicle	3/5
VG247	4/5

Star Wars Outlaws received "generally favorable" reviews from critics, according to review aggregator website Metacritic. The game is recommended by 66% of 175 critics, according to OpenCritic. In Japan, four critics from Famitsu gave the game a total score of 32 out of 40, with each critic awarding the game an 8 out of 10. Despite mostly positive critic reviews, some publications noted Outlaws had a "generally unfavorable" user score on Metacritic during release week. GameStar observed that the game is polarizing players, but added that the lack of thoughtful feedback in many negative reviews on the platform is a concern.

Tristan Ogilvie of IGN gave it 7 out of 10, and was critical of the lack of original ideas and numerous technical issues. He appreciated the syndicate system and the addition of the companion Nix, but found the stealth and combat rigid and repetitive. He compared the game to the Millennium Falcon as "a bucket of bolts held together with repurposed parts and prone to breaking down, but at its best it's more than capable of jolting your pleasure centres into Star Wars fan hyperspace."

=== Sales ===
During release week, Reuters attributed the drop in Ubisoft shares, their lowest since 2015, to the "muted reception" of Star Wars Outlaws. J.P. Morgan analyst Daniel Kerven noted the game had trouble meeting sales expectations, lowering his forecast by 2 million units. He also highlighted that Outlaws' development budget was 30% higher than Assassin's Creed Mirage, and Twitch data showed it was underperforming Assassin's Creed Mirage by 15%.

In September 2024, Ubisoft provided insights into the sales performance of Star Wars Outlaws, describing it as "softer than expected." As a result, Ubisoft delayed the release of Assassin's Creed Shadows and announced the PC port would be available on Steam at launch, instead of delayed like Star Wars Outlaws. In October 2024, Ubisoft released its half-year results, acknowledging that Star Wars Outlaws sales "underperformed expectations."

Star Wars Outlaws debuted as the 3rd best selling game in the United States in August 2024. That same month, It was 9th in the top 20 games by revenue in the US, UK, Germany, France, Spain, and Italy for August, on both PC and consoles. On the PS5, It was the 5th most downloaded game in the USA and Canada and 3rd in Europe during August. Overall, the game was the 2nd best selling title in Europe in August 2024. In the UK, it was the best selling game during the last week of August 2024. According to Insider Gaming, the game had sold 1 million units within its first month of release. The game was the 47th best selling title in Europe in 2024.

During a Ubisoft shareholders meeting in July 2025, CEO Yves Guillemot revealed that Star Wars Outlaws did not reach sales targets, attributing the shortfall to the Star Wars brand being "in a bit of choppy waters" and the game having "a few items that needed to be polished".

=== Accolades ===
Year	Award	Category	Result	Ref.
2023	The Game Awards 2023	Most Anticipated Game	Nominated	
2023	Golden Joystick Awards 2023	Most Wanted Game	Nominated	
2024	Gamescom Awards 2024	Best Audio	Nominated	
2024	Gamescom Awards 2024	Best Microsoft Xbox Game	Nominated	
2024	Gamescom Awards 2024	Best Visuals	Nominated	
2024	Gamescom Awards 2024	Most Entertaining	Nominated	
2024	Gamescom Awards 2024	Most Epic	Nominated	
2024	Golden Joystick Awards 2024	Best Audio Design	Nominated	
2024	Golden Joystick Awards 2024	Best Lead Performer (Humberly Gonzalez as Kay Vess)	Nominated	
2024	The Game Awards 2024	Best Performance (Humberly Gonzalez as Kay Vess)	Nominated	
2024	The Game Awards 2024	Best Action / Adventure Game	Nominated	
2024	The Game Awards 2024	Innovation in Accessibility	Nominated	
2025	New York Game Awards 2024	Great White Way Award for Best Acting in a Game (Humberly Gonzalez as Kay Vess)	Nominated	
2025	67th Annual Grammy Awards	Best Score Soundtrack for Video Games and Other Interactive Media	Nominated	
2025	28th Annual D.I.C.E. Awards	Outstanding Achievement in Original Music Composition	Nominated	
2025	Game Audio Network Guild Awards	Best Main Theme	Won	
2025	Game Audio Network Guild Awards	Best Original Song ("This Cantina Can't Contain Us")	Won	
2025	Game Audio Network Guild Awards	Best Original Soundtrack Album	Won	
2025	Game Audio Network Guild Awards	Creative and Technical Achievement in Music	Won	
2025	21st British Academy Games Awards	Audio Achievement	Nominated	
2025	21st British Academy Games Awards	Music	Nominated	
2025	21st British Academy Games Awards	Performer in a Leading Role (Humberly González as Kay Vess)	Nominated	
2026	68th Annual Grammy Awards	Best Score Soundtrack for Video Games and Other Interactive Media (Wild Card & A Pirate's Fortune)	Nominated	
2026	7th Society of Composers & Lyricists Awards	Outstanding Original Score for Interactive Media	Nominated	
