= XDefiant =

2024 video game

- Developer: Ubisoft San Francisco (Note: Additional work by Ubisoft Annecy, Ubisoft Düsseldorf, Ubisoft Sydney, Ubisoft Pune, Ubisoft Toronto, Ubisoft Mumbai, Ubisoft Saguenay, Ubisoft Kyiv, Ubisoft Odesa, Ubisoft Osaka, Ubisoft Winnipeg and Red Storm Entertainment)
- Publisher: Ubisoft
- Director: Safy Saada
- Producers: Mark Rubin; Jason Schroeder
- Designers: Matt Morales; John E. Slaydon
- Artists: Carmen Chow; Yuki Takahashi
- Writer: Demian Linn
- Composers: Nicholas Bonardi; Andrew Levin
- Engine: Snowdrop
- Platforms: PlayStation 5; Windows; Xbox Series X/S
- Release: May 21, 2024
- Genre: First-person shooter
- Mode: Multiplayer

XDefiant was a free-to-play first-person shooter game developed by Ubisoft San Francisco and published by Ubisoft. The game was released for PlayStation 5, Windows, and Xbox Series X/S on May 21, 2024. It received mixed reviews from critics.

On December 3, 2024, Ubisoft announced that XDefiant would permanently shut down, with new player registrations and downloads no longer available, and the servers were sunset after a final update later that month. On June 3, 2025, the game fully shut down and was taken offline.

== Gameplay ==
XDefiant featured a variety of factions and classes, each with their own unique abilities and weapons. It is set in the Ubisoft universe, map locations are based on multiple Ubisoft titles' in-game locations. Players engage in fast-paced, team-based multiplayer matches across a variety of maps and game modes.

The setting of the game revolves around factions called "Defiants", that previously appeared in other Ubisoft franchises. This includes The Division, Ghost Recon, Rainbow Six and Splinter Cell from the Tom Clancy's brand as well as Assassin's Creed, Far Cry and Watch Dogs. Defiants are customizable with traits, abilities, devices, weapons and items. It has 6-versus-6 linear game modes (such as "Domination" and "Escort").

== Development ==
Tom Clancy's XDefiant was announced by Ubisoft in July 2021. A closed Insider test of a pre-alpha version of XDefiant occurred in North America in 2021. A second Insider test was held in February 2023. A closed beta test began on April 13 and ended on April 23. In March 2022, the game was rebranded as a part of the Ubisoft Originals brand, dropping the Tom Clancy's universe title, as the inclusion of characters from other Ubisoft franchises was planned, including those from the Tom Clancy's universe, as previously mentioned.

On April 17, 2023, shortly after the launch of the game's closed beta, XDefiant became one of the top games to be streamed on the Twitch streaming platform, gaining around 50k viewers and passing the combined popularity of Warzone 2.0 and Modern Warfare II.

During the Ubisoft Forward presentation on June 12, 2023, Ubisoft announced an open session, which started on June 20 for closed beta test participants (June 21 for all players) and ended on June 23. A Public Test Session was announced solely for PC started on September 28 and ended the following day. Ubisoft planned the game to release in early-to-mid October, however the game ultimately missed this window. This delay was the result of the open session, which had "surfaced some inconsistencies in the game experience", director Mark Rubin announced that XDefiant's release was delayed temporarily, with the game ultimately releasing the following year.

In August 2024, following layoffs at numerous Ubisoft studios including the game's lead developer, Ubisoft San Francisco, it was rumored that Ubisoft was considering ending support for the game, as the concurrent player count had dropped below 20,000 players. On October 15, 2024, the game's executive producer, Mark Rubin, addressed the rumors of the game's imminent closure and stated that it was not being canceled at that time. He further stated that plans for Year 2 content were still in place, reassuring players that updates and future developments were underway. On December 3, 2024, only 7 weeks following his denial of the game's closure, Rubin announced that Ubisoft would be discontinuing development of the game, with new player registrations and downloads stopping the same day and automatically refunding previous 30-day sales and DLC costs back to players. Lead developer Ubisoft San Francisco was also announced to be closing as a result. The servers were later shut down on June 3, 2025.

== Release ==
XDefiant was released on May 21, 2024. On its launch day, it achieved 1 million unique players within two and a half hours. The milestone makes it Ubisoft's fastest game to reach 1 million unique players. 48 hours after launch, XDefiant had just over 3 million unique players and around 300,000 concurrent players across all platforms. Despite initial server issues causing many players to wait in the menu, these problems were resolved approximately eight to ten hours after launch. By June, it had accumulated 11 million players.

The Year 1 Roadmap initially included four seasons with 12 new weapons, 12 new maps, four new factions, four battle passes, as well as other new content and fixes.

The first season was announced along with a release date of July 2, 2024, during the Ubisoft Forward 2024 event. Content included three maps, with one map coming out per month, three new weapons, the GS-Kommando faction from Rainbow Six: Siege, Capture the Flag mode, ranked progression rewards, and more in-store items and bundles. The studio also revealed an XDebrief event centered on the new season, scheduled to occur a day before the season's release.

The second season launched on September 24, 2024, with the Highwaymen from Far Cry New Dawn joining the game as a new faction.

The third and final season launched on December 18, 2024, with three new factions joining the game: the Assassins from Assassin's Creed, the Wolves from Ghost Recon Breakpoint and Omega Force from Far Cry 3: Blood Dragon.

Following a sunset announcement in December 2024 Ubisoft took all servers offline on June 3, 2025, ending downloads and play.

== Reception ==
Reception

Aggregate scores
Aggregator	Score
Metacritic	(PC) 67/100 (XSXS) 72/100 (PS5) 69/100
OpenCritic	51% recommend

XDefiant received "mixed or average" reviews from critics, according to review aggregator website Metacritic. Fellow review aggregator OpenCritic assessed that the game received fair approval, being recommended by 51% of critics.
