= Ubisoft Toronto =

Canadian video game developer and Ubisoft studio

Ubisoft Toronto Inc.

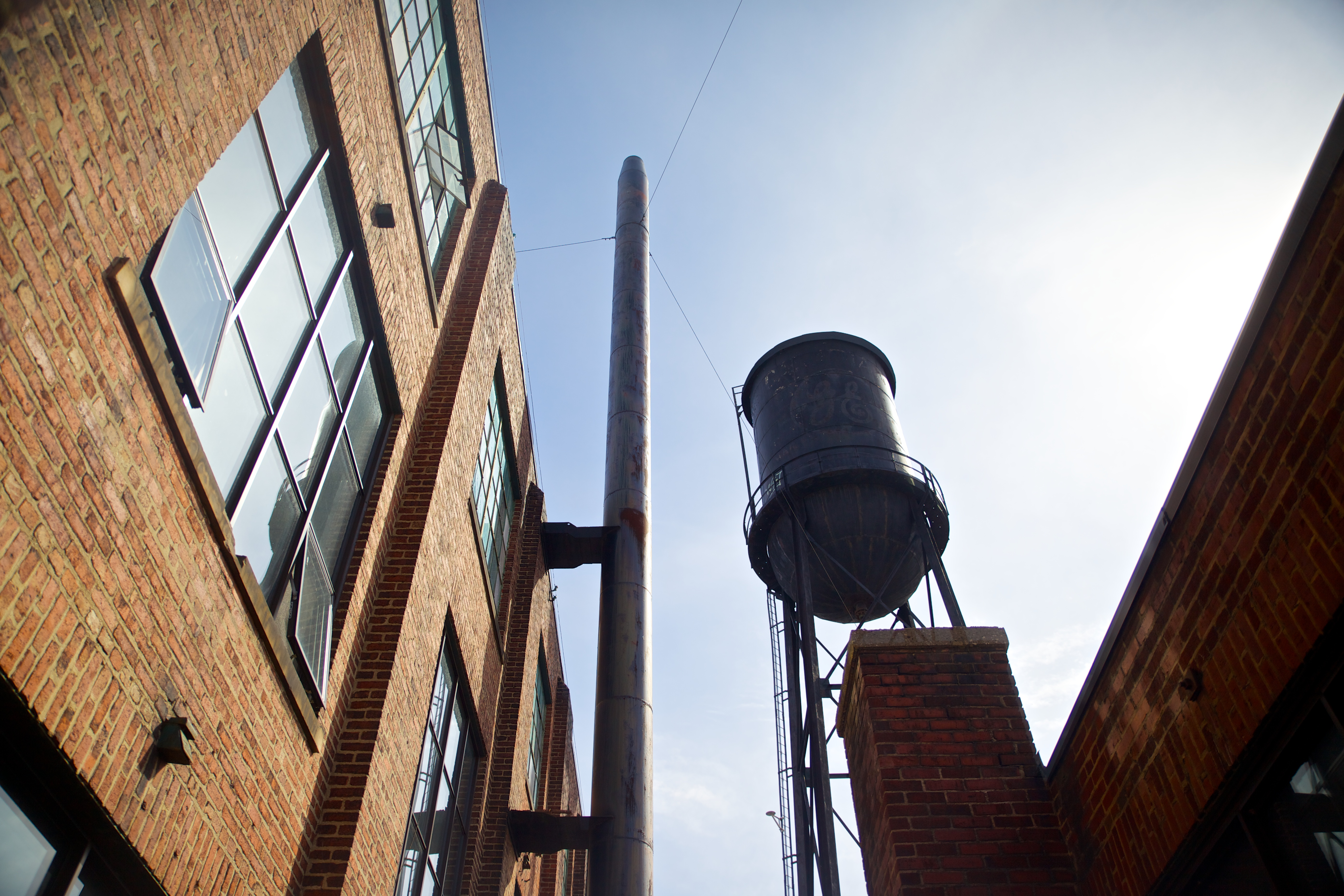
- Ubisoft Toronto headquarters in March 2013
- Type: Subsidiary
- Industry: Video games
- Founded: September 2010; 16 years ago
- Founder: Jade Raymond; Alexandre Parizeau; Maxime Béland
- Headquarters: Toronto, Canada
- Key people: Darryl Long (managing director)
- Number of employees: 600 (2017)
- Parent: Ubisoft
- Website: toronto.ubisoft.com

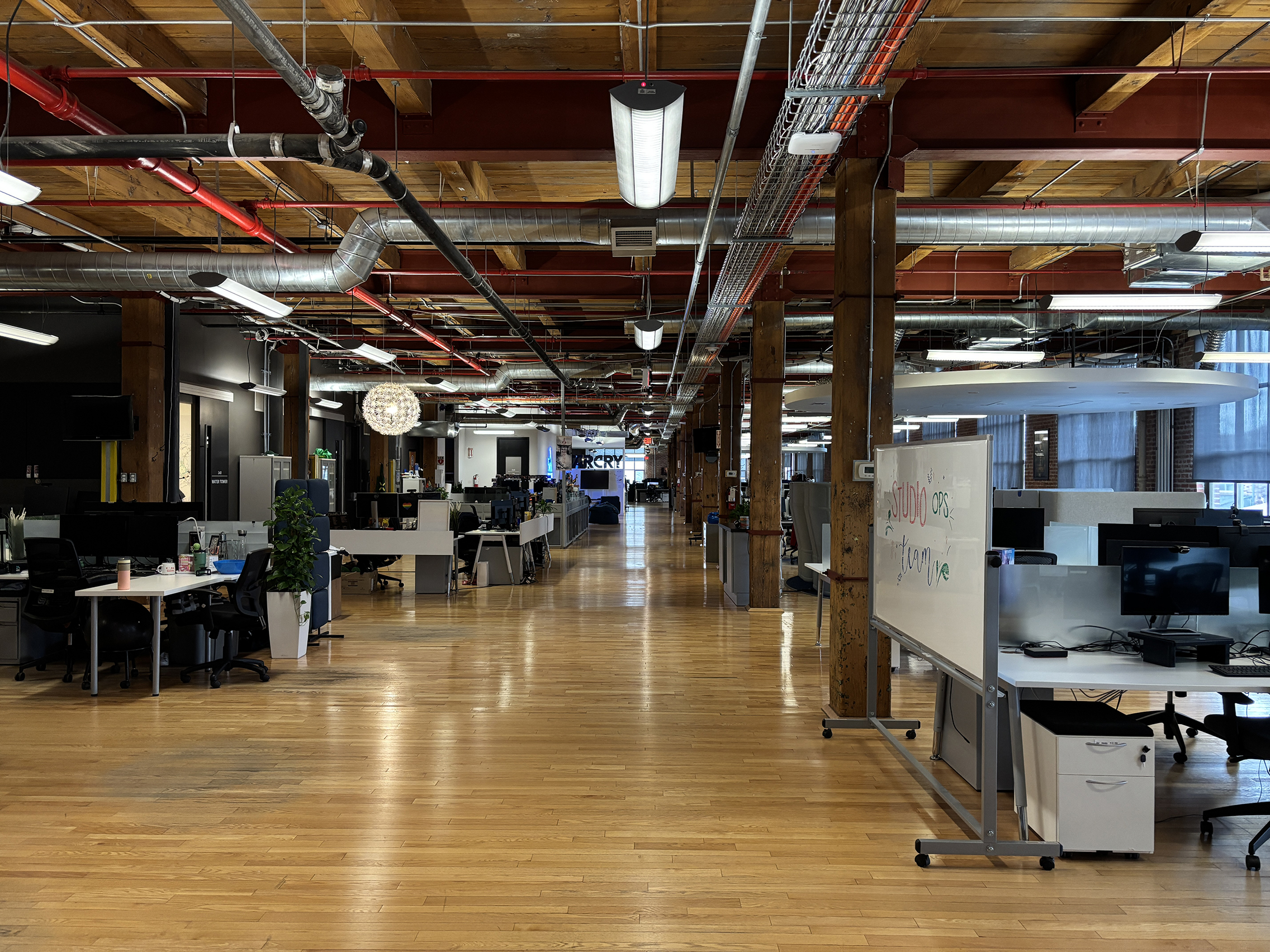
Working studio in Level 2

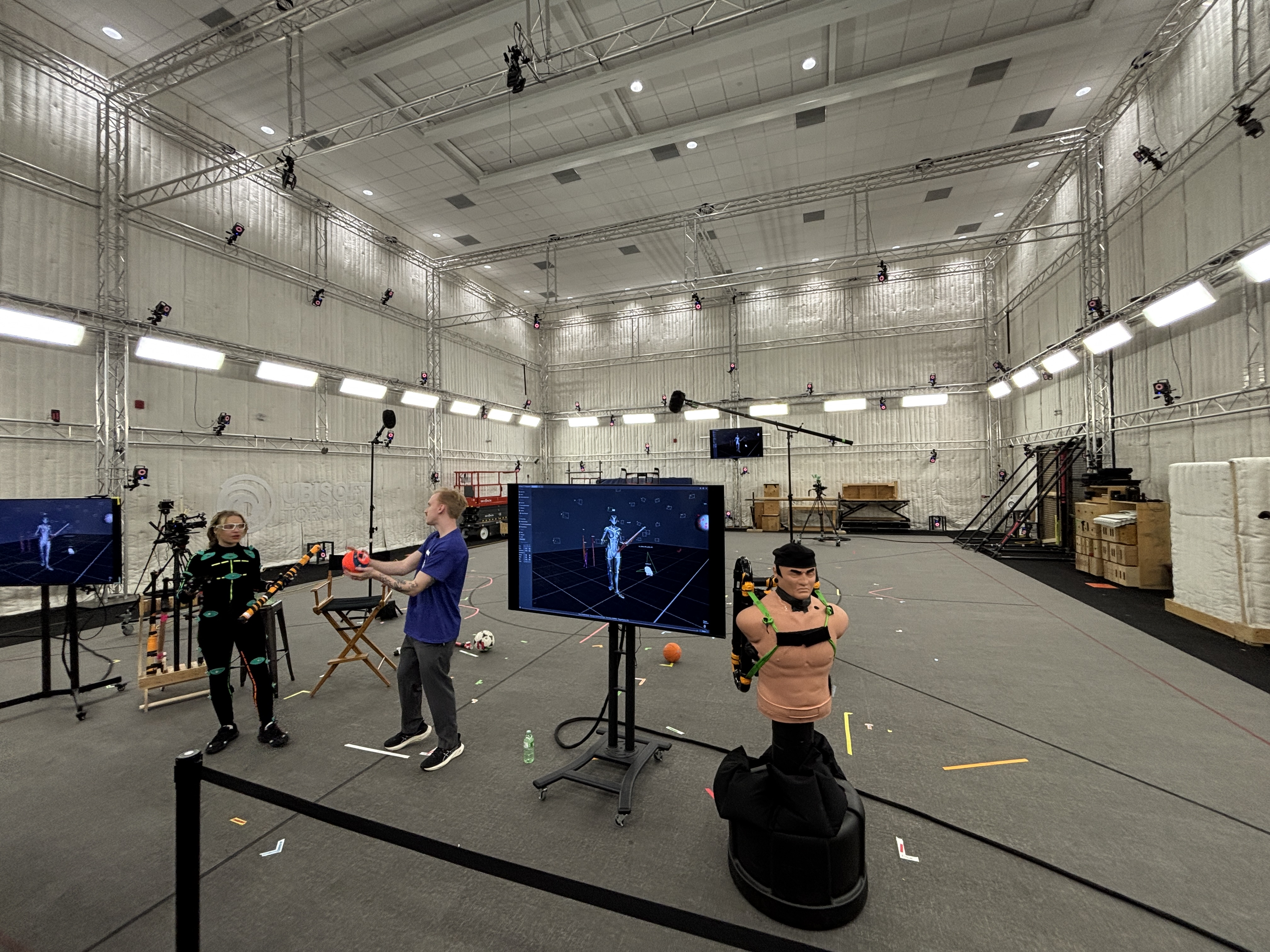
Performance Capture Studio

Ubisoft Toronto Inc. is a Canadian video game developer and a studio of Ubisoft based in Toronto. The studio was established under Jade Raymond in September 2010. Games developed by Ubisoft Toronto include Tom Clancy's Splinter Cell: Blacklist, Far Cry 5, Starlink: Battle for Atlas, Far Cry 6, and Watch Dogs Legion.

== History ==
Ubisoft announced in July 2009 that it was establishing a Toronto-based development studio. Yannis Mallat, the chief executive officer (CEO) of Ubisoft Montreal, was to become Ubisoft Toronto's CEO, while the government of Ontario was to invest CA$263 million over a course of 10 years to create up to 800 jobs. Unlike other Ubisoft studios, Ubisoft Toronto was immediately allowed to lead development of its games, whereas others start by only supporting larger studios like Ubisoft Montreal, though Ubisoft Toronto also served to support Montreal as part of its initial role as a sister studio.

By September 2009, Jade Raymond was put in charge of establishing the studio. Most of the studio's staff in its development phase, including Raymond, transferred to the new location from Ubisoft Montreal. Key hires included producer Alexandre Parizeau and creative director Maxime Béland, who were brought on for the production of a new game in the Tom Clancy's Splinter Cell series, and were considered co-founders of the studio alongside Raymond. A second, smaller development team for an undisclosed project was headed up by Lesley Phord-Toy, and Rima Brek was put in charge of the studio's internal Technology Group. By May 2010, Ubisoft Toronto had received more than 2,000 job applications.

Ubisoft Toronto's offices were established from a former General Electric building in the Junction Triangle neighborhood of Toronto. Ubisoft Toronto began operating in late 2009 and formally opened in September 2010.

By March 2012, Ubisoft Toronto had grown to 200 people, and to 300 by September 2013. By the latter, the studio had received 30,000 applications and given 1,800 job interviews. In September 2012, Ubisoft Toronto received an internal performance capture studio. The studio's debut project, Tom Clancy's Splinter Cell: Blacklist, was released in August 2013 to critical success. Raymond left the studio and was succeeded as general manager by Parizeau. By July 2015, Ubisoft Toronto was developing an original intellectual property (IP). This game was later revealed to be Starlink: Battle for Atlas, an action-adventure game with optional toys-to-life integration. The game was released in 2018 as the studio's first own IP. As of July 2017, Ubisoft Toronto has 600 staff members.

Near the end of June 2020 and into July 2020, a wave of accusations related to the MeToo movement swept through the video game industry, including several directed at some Ubisoft employees. Over one hundred employees of Ubisoft Toronto wrote to Parizeau in late June to report concerns related to sexual misconduct and the lack of action taken by management and human resources in response to their prior reports. Ubisoft announced it had investigated these reports, and in the case of Ubisoft Toronto, had requested studio co-founder Maxime Béland resign from the company. Speaking to Kotaku, some of these employees stated that there were still additional problems at the studio that went beyond Béland and they were still seeking signs of larger change from the studio and Ubisoft as a whole. Parizeau left the company in February 2021 and was replaced by Istvan Tajnay, who had previously been the managing director for Ubisoft Berlin.

In December 2021, it was announced that the studio was developing a remake of Tom Clancy's Splinter Cell (2002); reports on the project appeared earlier in October. After 2 years, Tajnay left the company in July of 2023 and was replaced by Darryl Long, who had previously been the managing director for Ubisoft Winnipeg and Ubisoft Singapore.

In June 2024, it was announced that Ubisoft Toronto would assist Ubisoft Montreal in the development of the Prince of Persia: The Sands of Time remake. Later that month, 33 employees were let go as part of a "targeted realignment to ensure it can deliver on its ambitious roadmap." The studio laid off 40 employees in February 2026.

== Gallery ==
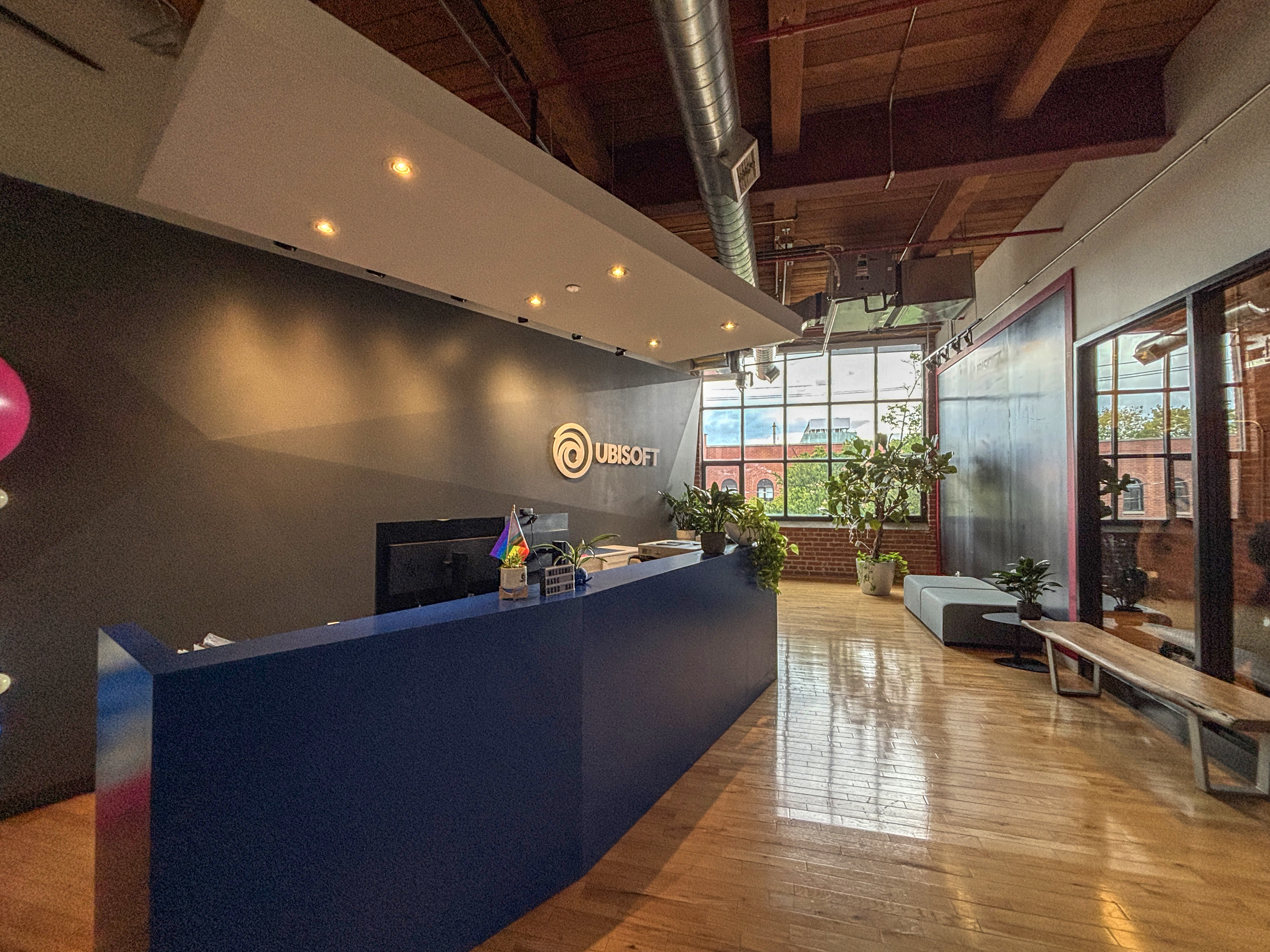
Reception

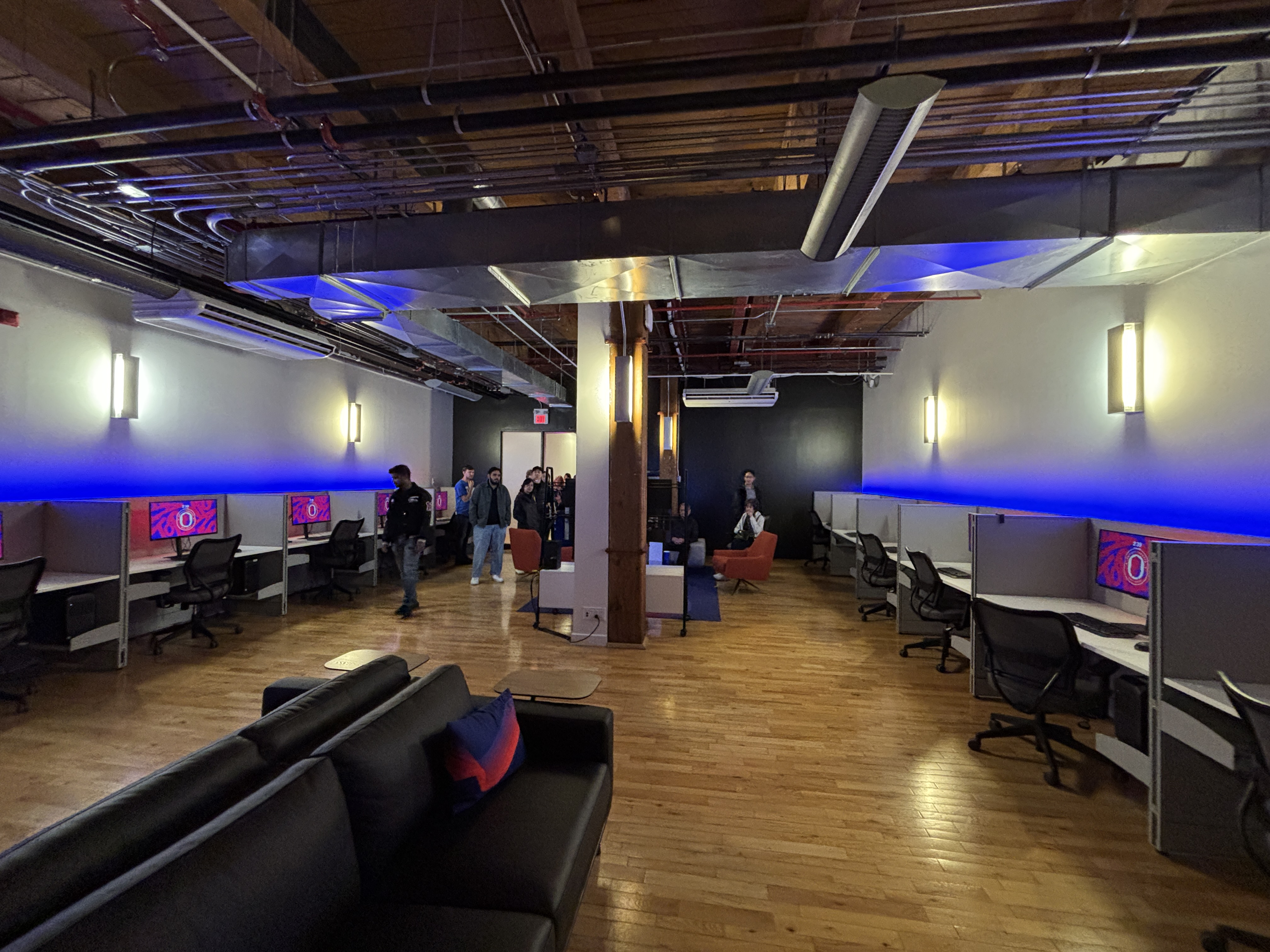
Arcade

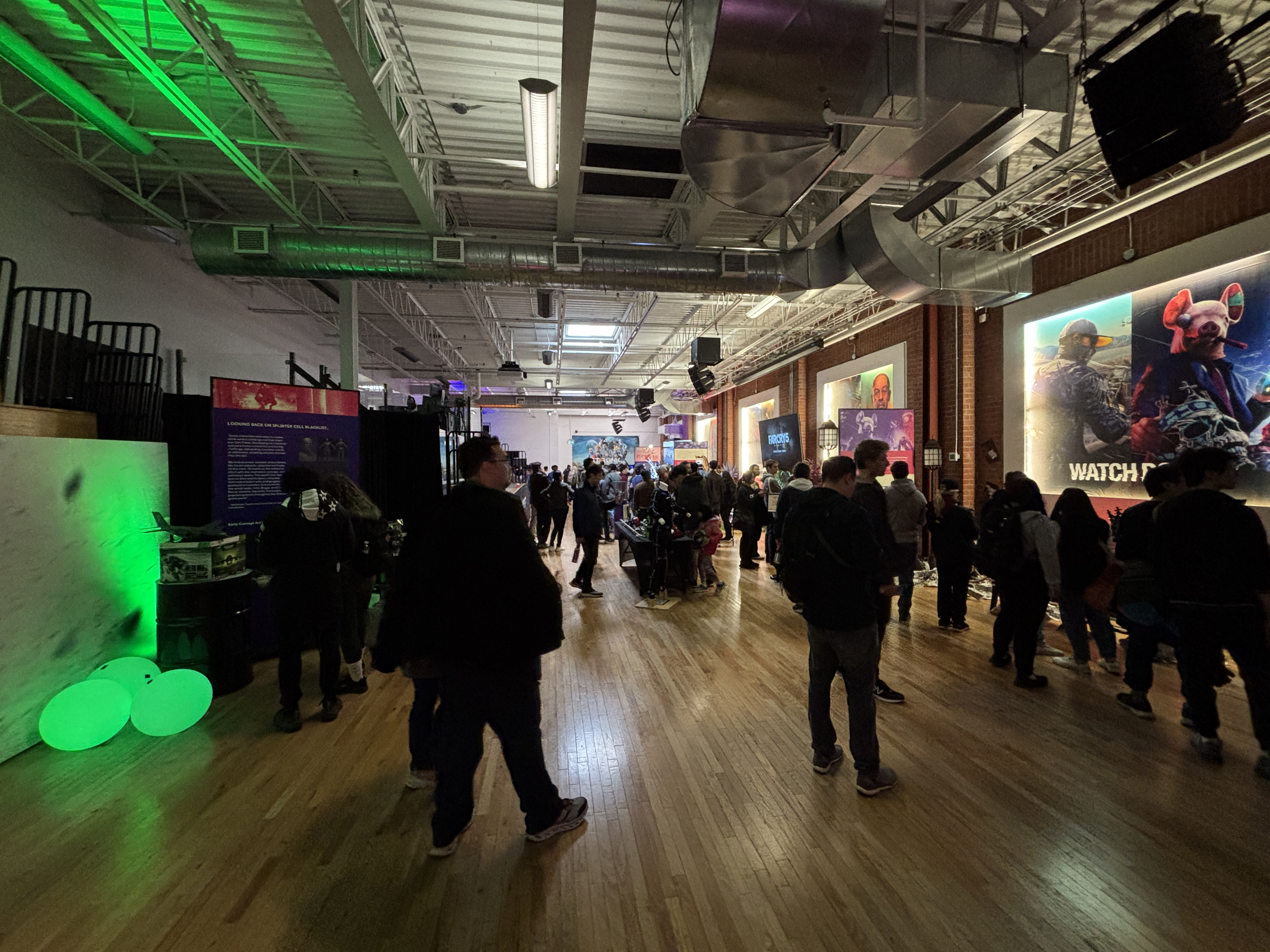
Room 250 is a large scale functional space

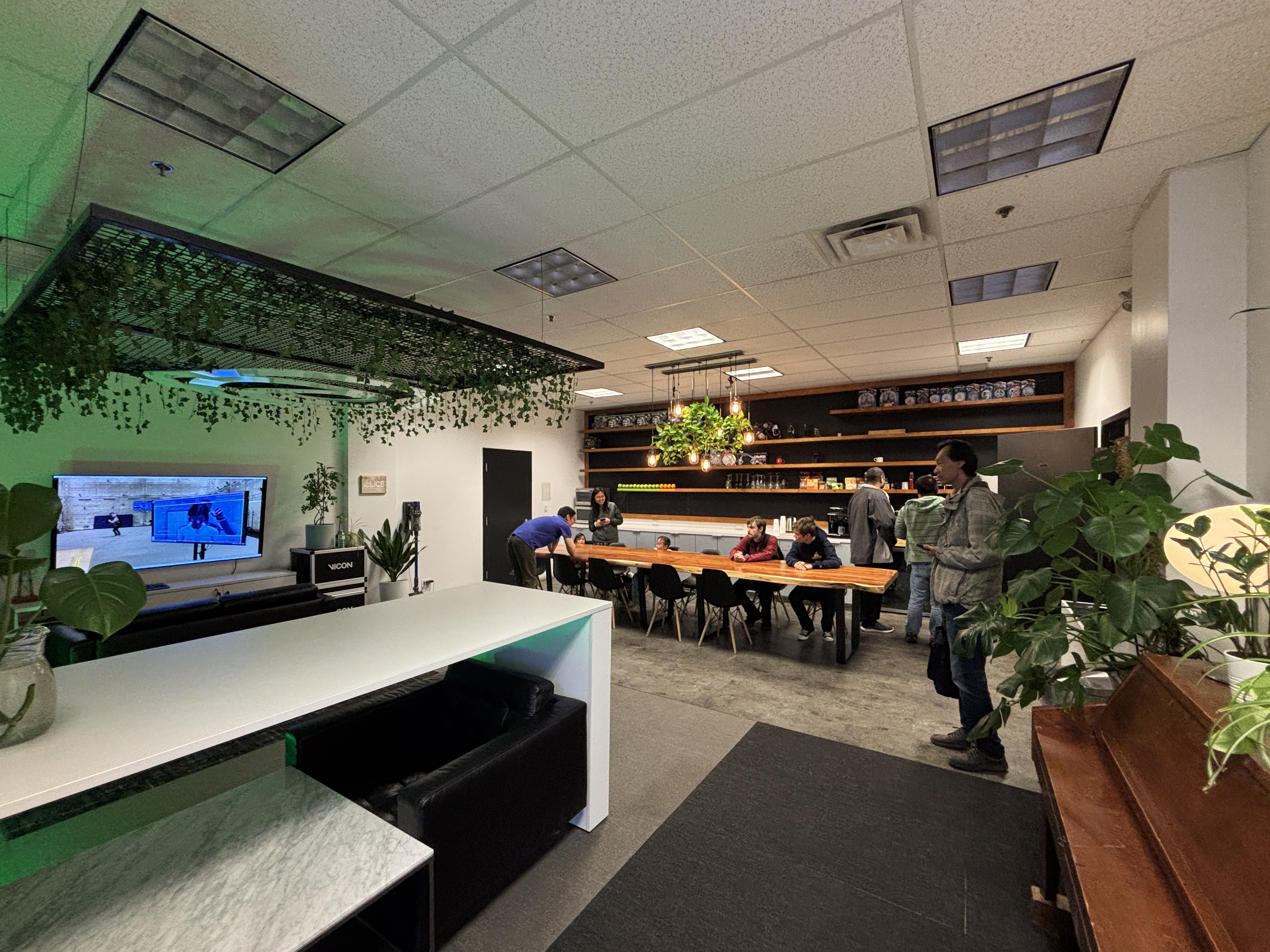
Green room

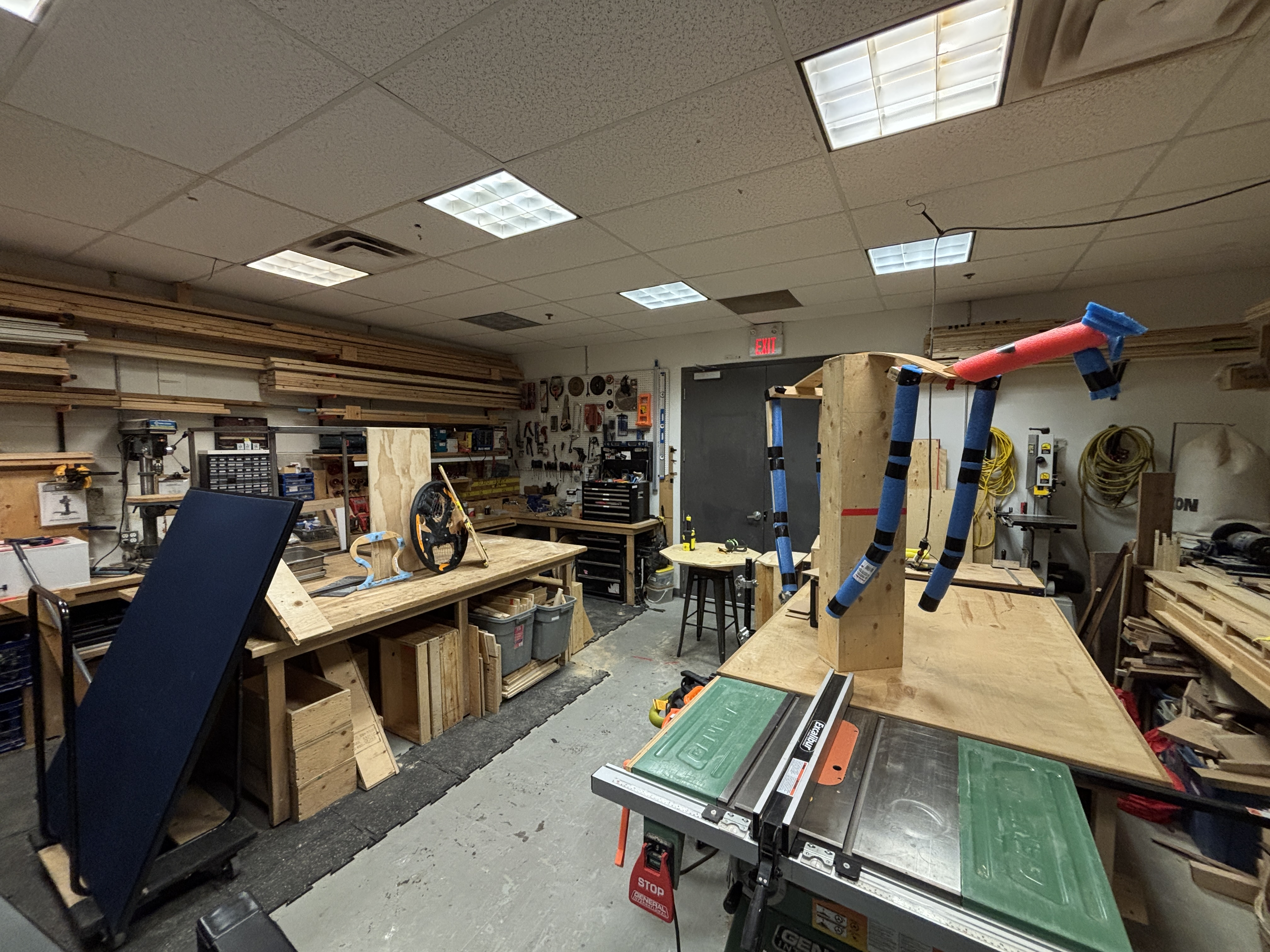
Woodworking Studio

== NEXT Competition ==
Ubisoft Toronto NEXT (Formerly Ubisoft Toronto NXT Showcase) is an annual competition held by Ubisoft Toronto, aimed towards post secondary students and recent graduates. The competition covers various job families and tasks students to complete a relevant submission that uses essential skills for the role, with the winner of each category being given an internship. As of the 2025 competition, 95 students have won internships at the studio.

List of Past NEXT Winners
Year	Category	Winner	School	Ref.
2018	Model Art	Armand Mech	Sheridan College	
2018	Concept Art	Dhenzel Obeng	Max The Mutt College	
2018	Animation	Duke Alphonse Sanchez	Durham College	
2018	Programming	Wesley Ducharme	Niagara College	
2019	Animation	Jacob LaFortune	George Brown College	
2019	Concept Art	Damir Musken	Fanshawe College	
2019	Level Design	Nathan Powless-Lynes	Sheridan College	
2019	Modelling	Dylan James Abernethy	Durham College	
2019	Programming	Jack Snopek	McMaster University	
2019	User Interface	Kogulan Sivaneshan	University of Toronto	
2020	3D Art	Dong-Hoon Choi	Centennial College	
2020	Animation	Bruno Sampaio Leme Dias	George Brown College	
2020	Concept Art	David Mattiacci	Toronto Film School	
2020	Level Design	Sukhraj Johal	Sheridan College	
2020	Programming	Jacob Pratley	Ontario Tech University	
2020	Technical Art	Mohamad Salame	Durham College	
2020	User Interface	Shane Saxton	Niagara College	
2021	3D Art	Maria Kniazieva	Centennial College	
2021	Concept Art	Sergi Iranzo	Max The Mutt College	
2021	Technical Art	Jessica Le	Ontario Tech University	
2021	Cinematic Animation	Yourim Kim	Centennial College	
2021	Gameplay Animation	Lavio Ribeiro Fidelis Neto	Mohawk College	
2021	Level Design	David De La Peña Frigolet	Sheridan College	
2021	Programming	Rob Savaglio	Ontario Tech University	
2022	3D Art	Ryan Honey	Durham College	
2022	Animation	Yuxing Wang	Sheridan College	
2022	Programming	Victor Shi	Western University	
2022	Level Design	Camila Kukulski	Sheridan College	
2022	Technical Art	Yuan Chen	Western University	
2022	Concept Art	Jackson Kachun So	George Brown College	
2023	3D Art	Melissa Friesen	Durham College	
2023	Animation	Xiangyu Chen	Sheridan College	
2023	Concept Art	Abhishek Arabind Das	George Brown College	
2023	Game Design	Junsu Jang	Sheridan College	
2023	Level Design	Ken Stevens	Sheridan College	
2023	Programming	Bijia Zhao	Toronto Metropolitan University	
2023	UX Design	Jay Lee	University of Waterloo	
2024	3D Art	Yueran (Cassandra) Zhou	Sheridan College	
2024	Animation	Jonathan Chen	Sheridan College	
2024	Concept Art	Qiushi Jin	Sheridan College	
2024	Game Design	Tiago Massochin	Sheridan College	
2024	Level Design	Chris Russell Shantz	Sheridan College	
2024	Programming	Shaelynn Keiko Curran	University of Toronto	
2024	Technical Art	Jiahui Hu	York University	
2025	3D Art	Anya Ng-Chee	Centennial College	
2025	Animation	Daylan Belsey	Durham College	
2025	Concept Art	Gabriel Fuentes	George Brown College	
2025	Event Scripting	Yun Yin (Joyce) Lin	Sheridan College	
2025	Level Design	Calvin Ip	Sheridan College	
2025	Programming	Ramy Zhang	University of Toronto	
2025	Technical Animation	Marcus Angelo Santos	Carleton University	
2025	Technical Art	Alexandro Di Nunzio	York University	
2025	VFX	Reyhan Ismail	York University	

== Games developed ==
=== Lead developer ===
Year	Title	Platform(s)	Notes	Ref.
2013	Tom Clancy's Splinter Cell: Blacklist	PlayStation 3, Wii U, Windows, Xbox 360	—N/a	
2018	Far Cry 5	PlayStation 4, Stadia, Windows, Xbox One	Developed in collaboration with Ubisoft Montreal	
2018	Starlink: Battle for Atlas	Nintendo Switch, PlayStation 4, Windows, Xbox One	—N/a	
2020	Watch Dogs: Legion	PlayStation 4, PlayStation 5, Stadia, Windows, Xbox One, Xbox Series X/S	Also developed the expansion pack Bloodline (2021)	
2021	Far Cry 6	PlayStation 4, PlayStation 5, Stadia, Windows, Xbox One, Xbox Series X/S	Also developed the expansion pack Lost Between Worlds (2022)	
TBA	Tom Clancy's Splinter Cell: Remake	TBA	A remake of the 2002 video game of the same name	

=== Supportive development ===
Year	Title	Platform(s)	Notes	Ref.
2014	Assassin's Creed Unity	PlayStation 4, Stadia, Windows, Xbox One	Supportive development for Ubisoft Montreal	
2014	Far Cry 4	PlayStation 3, PlayStation 4, Windows, Xbox 360, Xbox One	Supportive development for Ubisoft Montreal	
2016	Far Cry Primal	PlayStation 4, Stadia, Windows, Xbox One	Supportive development for Ubisoft Montreal	
2016	Watch Dogs 2	PlayStation 4, Stadia, Windows, Xbox One	Supportive development for Ubisoft Montreal	
2017	For Honor	PlayStation 4, Windows, Xbox One	Supportive development for Ubisoft Montreal	
2022	Mario + Rabbids Sparks of Hope	Nintendo Switch	Supportive development for Ubisoft Milan and Ubisoft Paris	
2023	The Crew Motorfest	PlayStation 4, PlayStation 5, Windows, Xbox One, Xbox Series X/S	Supportive development for Ubisoft Ivory Tower	
2023	Avatar: Frontiers of Pandora	PlayStation 5, Windows, Xbox Series X/S	Supportive development for Massive Entertainment	
2024	XDefiant	PlayStation 5, Windows, Xbox Series X/S	Supportive development for Ubisoft San Francisco	
2024	Star Wars Outlaws	PlayStation 5, Windows, Xbox Series X/S	Supportive development for Massive Entertainment	
