= Tom Clancy's Splinter Cell: Remake =

Upcoming video game

Splinter Cell Remake
- Developer: Ubisoft Toronto
- Publisher: Ubisoft
- Directors: Chris Auty; David Grivel
- Producer: Matt West
- Series: Tom Clancy's Splinter Cell
- Engine: Snowdrop
- Release: TBA
- Genres: Action-adventure, stealth
- Mode: Single-player

Tom Clancy's Splinter Cell: Remake is an upcoming action-adventure stealth game developed by Ubisoft Toronto and published by Ubisoft. It is a remake of the 2002 game Tom Clancy's Splinter Cell which was originally developed by Ubisoft Montreal. It is being built “from the ground up” and aims to preserve the core spirit of the original while employing modern technology and design sensibilities. The project is being built using the Snowdrop engine.

== Development and release ==
On 15 December 2021, Ubisoft formally announced that a remake of the original Splinter Cell was green-lit, led by Ubisoft Toronto. The announcement noted the use of Ubisoft’s in-house Snowdrop engine and emphasized that the remake would be built from scratch rather than simply remastered. The concept arts was posted by Ubisoft as a celebration of 20th anniversary of Splinter Cell franchise. The director, David Grivel, left the project in October 2022. Grivel would eventually return to the project on December 2, 2025, continuing his role as director.

According to producer Matt West and creative director Chris Auty, the remake will keep the game’s linear mission-based structure rather than shift to an open-world format, and strive to preserve the “feel” of the early games (e.g., using darkness, gadgets, infiltration), and the idea of being a ghost in the shadows. The team has said that while the core will be faithful, some design elements will be updated to meet modern player expectations (controls, UI, comfort options).
