= Tom Clancy's The Division 2 =

2019 video game

- Developer: Massive Entertainment
- Publisher: Ubisoft
- Directors: Julian Gerighty; Mathias Karlson
- Producer: Cristian Pana
- Programmer: Carl Johan Lejdfors
- Artist: Benedikt Podlesnigg
- Writer: Craig Hubbard
- Composer: Ola Strandh
- Series: Tom Clancy's
- Engine: Snowdrop
- Platforms: PlayStation 4; Windows; Xbox One; Stadia
- Release: March 15, 2019 (Note: The Gold and Ultimate Editions were released on March 12, 2019, while the Standard Edition was released on March 15. The Stadia version was released on March 17, 2020.)
- Genres: Action role-playing, third-person shooter
- Mode: Multiplayer

Tom Clancy's The Division 2 is a 2019 online-only action role-playing video game developed by Massive Entertainment and published by Ubisoft. The game, which is the sequel to Tom Clancy's The Division (2016), is set in a near-future Washington, D.C., in the aftermath of the release of a genetically engineered virus known as "Green Poison" and follows an agent of the Strategic Homeland Division as they try to rebuild the city. Like its predecessor, The Division 2 is a third-person shooter in which the player uses weapons and gadgets to fight enemy factions. The game features elements of role-playing games (RPGs) and has cooperative and player-versus-player online multiplayer modes.

Massive Entertainment worked with Ubisoft Reflections, Red Storm Entertainment, and Ubisoft's studios in Annecy, Paris, Bucharest and Shanghai to create the game. The developers evaluated feedback from players of the first game and decided to have more-robust endgame content at launch. They explored other cities as the game's setting, ultimately choosing Washington, D.C., due to its diverse environments, landmarks and monuments that could be recreated. The developers were inspired by real-life disasters while creating the game's post-apocalyptic world and consulted first responders and experts in emergency management. Tom Clancy's The Division 2 was released for PlayStation 4, Windows and Xbox One on March 15, 2019.

Critics gave Tom Clancy's The Division 2 generally favorable reviews, with most noting it as an improvement over the first installment for its setting, gameplay, visuals, combat, level design and wealth of content at launch, though its narrative received criticism. Like its predecessor, the game was a commercial success, selling over 10 million copies worldwide despite not meeting expectations at launch. The game was nominated for Best Multiplayer at the annual The Game Awards and BAFTA Game Awards. As a live service game, Ubisoft supported it with downloadable content (DLC) packs and free updates, and released three expansion packs, Warlords of New York (2020), Battle for Brooklyn (2025), and Echoes of Central Park (2026). A sequel titled Tom Clancy's The Division 3 is in development.

== Gameplay ==
The player uses a sentry gun while hiding behind cover to fight enemies near the Washington Monument.

The Division 2 is a cover-based third-person shooter in which up to four players can complete missions together. The game takes place in Washington, D.C., seven months after the events of its predecessor Tom Clancy's The Division, in which a civil war between survivors and villainous bands of marauders breaks out. At the beginning of the game, players create their own Division agent by customizing the character's gender and appearance. The agent is equipped with explosives like grenades as well as firearms, including assault rifles, sniper rifles and submachine guns; these weapons are classified into tiers and rarity. High-quality guns are difficult to obtain but have better weapon statistics and "talents" that help boost players' performance. Weapons can be further customized with attachments like firearm optics, iron sights and barrel attachments. The game also features a variety of gear and armor; wearing gear from the same brand gives players a small performance boost.

As players complete missions, they gain loot and experience points (XP). With sufficient XP, they level up and gain SHD Tech, a currency that is used to unlock new skills, including the deployment of gun turrets, shields and combat drones, or gaining access to weapons like seeker mines and chemical launchers. Each skill has unique mods that change its functionality. The game introduces new types of enemy, including healers and characters who shoot foam at players. During missions, players can request backup, which allows other players to join their sessions. Players can join a clan that can accommodate up to 50 players. The actions of individual clan members contribute to clan XP, which can be used to upgrade the clan for additional gameplay benefits.

Washington, D.C., is an open world for players to explore. Players can recruit non-playable characters (NPCs) by completing missions and providing supplies to settlements. Recruiting NPCs unlocks projects that reward players with gear, XP and blueprints for crafting. Upgrading settlements enables their expansion to include more facilities and gives players benefits such as access to their gear stash or fast travel. Discovery of a safehouse reveals the location of nearby SHD caches and additional fast travel points. Players can liberate enemies' control points and call civilian reinforcements to assist in battle, participate in world events, such as stopping public executions and capturing resource convoys, and searching for collectibles including comms, relics and Echoes. Players encounter weapon vendors who buy trinkets (unusable "junk" items players collect) and unwanted gear in exchange for E-credits, the game's currency, for purchasing new weapons, crafting and appearances changes.

=== Dark Zones and endgame content ===
The Division 2 features three Dark Zones, where players defeat tough enemies for valuable and rare loot, though the loot can be taken by other players. Each Dark Zone supports up to 12 players. Upon entering a Dark Zone, players' gear become normalized to ensure all players are on equal terms. Non-contaminated loot belongs to players once it is collected but contaminated loot must be extracted by a helicopter while players defend the extraction point from artificial intelligence (AI) enemies and other players. When one player breaks into a Dark-Zone chest or steals a Dark-Zone supply drop, the player and their team will become rogue. Rogue players can attack other players in the same session to steal their loot and gain XP. Once they eliminate another player, they become "disavowed", which alerts other non-rogue players. If the disavowed rogue eliminates more players, they become a "Manhunt Rogue" and players who kill the rogue agent will receive a significant bounty. Rogue status can be removed by surviving in the Dark Zone for a period of time or accessing the Thieves' Dens (for rogues) and Manhunt terminals (for Manhunt rogues). The Dark Zone has its own progression system called DZ XP, which is earned by killing enemies and rogues, and can be used to unlock perks and gameplay advantages such as a reduced rogue timer. The Division 2 also includes a traditional competitive multiplayer mode named Conflict, which players can compete against each Skirmish, Domination and other modes. Conflict maps are set in standalone locations that are not contiguous with the main open-world map.

When a player reaches level 30 and finishes the game's campaign, the game-world is divided into "world tiers", which serve as thresholds for further increasing the game's difficulty. Player levels are replaced by Gear Score, which is calculated using the statistics, attributes and talents of all of the player's weapons and armor. In the endgame, a new enemy faction named Black Tusk invades D.C. and randomly selects three previously completed missions or strongholds as operational targets, reactivating them as invaded locations. Invaded locations have tougher enemies and correspondingly better loot. By completing Invaded missions and having a sufficient Gear Score, players can liberate a stronghold to unlock the next world tier. Players can encounter 52 bosses, collectively known as the Deck of 52; each boss will drop a collectible card for players once they are defeated. Players can unlock more skills by specializing their character to a specific class. Each specialization has a signature weapon; the Survivalist uses a crossbow, the Sharpshooter wields a TAC-50 anti-materiel sniper rifle, and the Demolitionist uses a M32A1 grenade launcher. Post-launch updates introduced the Gunner, who can use a portable minigun; the Technician, who is equipped with a missile launcher; and the Firewall class, who wields a flamethrower. Players can enter Occupied Dark Zones in which weapons are no longer normalized, friendly fire is activated, AI enemies become more difficult to kill and players are no longer notified when other players turn rogue. The game features raids, which are extended combat challenges that can be completed by up to eight players.

== Synopsis ==
=== Setting ===
In 2015, in response to the chaos and unrest caused by the outbreak of the Green Poison epidemic depicted in Tom Clancy's The Division in New York City, the United States government activated a secret contingent of domestic sleeper agents under the Strategic Homeland Division (SHD or "the Division") to preserve order and continuity of government. Division agents use advanced technology, have wide autonomy to deal with threats and are supplemented by the Intelligent System Analytic Computer (ISAC), an advanced AI system that manages their technology and communications nationwide.

By 2016, law and order have mostly collapsed after the Green Poison became a global pandemic. Most of the U.S. government's leadership is dead or missing, and the acting U.S. President Andrew Ellis is missing and feared dead after Air Force One is shot down in Washington, D.C. The city is now lawless and has been divided into territories by five factions: the White House-based Joint Task Force (JTF), consisting of police, fire and rescue, National Guard, disaster response organizations and volunteers, attempts to protect civilians and re-establish order; the Civilian Militia, a loose militia that supports the JTF and is based in settlements across the city; the Hyenas, a loose coalition of gangs, criminals and anarchists based in the District Union Arena who take advantage of the chaos for amusement and profit; the Outcasts, fanatical survivors of severe quarantines based on Roosevelt Island who seek revenge on those they deem responsible for their imprisonment and eventual infection; and the True Sons, based in the Capitol—an organized, ruthless group of disgruntled and corrupt JTF, U.S. military and paramilitary mutineers who believe order can only be restored through brutal authoritarianism.

=== Plot ===
Seven months after the Green Poison outbreak, several Division agents are defending a civilian settlement from a bandit attack when ISAC suddenly shuts down. The player Agent receives a Division distress call from Washington, D.C., as a new, larger force begins to attack the JTF's settlement. At a fellow agent's urging, they abandon the battle to travel to D.C. and help the JTF fend off an attack by the Hyenas. Manny Ortega, the city's Division controller, briefs the Agent and informs them of the situation in the city. Ortega instructs the Agent to work with fellow agent Alani Kelso to assist civilian settlements, liberate the city from criminal factions, and restore ISAC.

Ortega and Kelso uncover information about a cure to Green Poison that might be located somewhere in the city, and that President Ellis may have survived the crash but is being held prisoner. Kelso is reluctant to waste time and resources to find Ellis, but Ortega notes his security clearance may be needed to access the cure. The Agent eventually rescues Ellis from the Hyenas. Ellis confirms the existence of broad-spectrum antivirals that cure Green Poison and all viral infections, but he can only access them with a special briefcase in the Capitol, which is occupied by the True Sons. After the Agent fully restores ISAC, reconnecting Division agents across the country, Ellis vows to restore the United States at any cost. The Agent, JTF and the Civilian Militia assault the strongholds of the Hyenas, True Sons and Outcasts, killing most of their leadership and allowing the recovery of Ellis' briefcase.

As the Agent and the Division celebrate their victory, a new faction, the technologically advanced private military company Black Tusk, invades the city. Many of D.C.'s landmarks are quickly seized and Ellis suddenly goes missing with his briefcase, forcing the Agent to search for him and repel Black Tusk. The Agent eventually learns Black Tusk has supplied weapons to the city's gangs and was responsible for sabotaging ISAC; Furthermore, the Agent discovers that Ellis has been working with Black Tusk and that Ellis' predecessor, President Mendez, did not die by suicide as previously believed, but was assassinated by the Secret Service detail on Black Tusk's orders. Thanks to Ellis, Black Tusk gains possession of the broad-spectrum antivirals and plans to move them out of the city. The Agent raids Black Tusk's stronghold at Tidal Basin, retrieving the antivirals and preventing a missile strike on the White House, but Ellis' location remains unknown.

=== Warlords of New York expansion ===
The Agent and Kelso travel to New York City to answer a distress call from Faye Lau, leader of local Division operations. They find the JTF and Division's base in City Hall has been devastated by "Eclipse", a lethal variant of Green Poison the rogue Division agent Aaron Keener and his allies created. The Agent, Kelso, Lau and JTF leader Roy Benitez regroup at Haven, a civilian settlement run by Paul Rhodes, who reluctantly permits their presence. The settlement is under constant attack and harassment from the Cleaners and the Rikers, a group of sadistic Rikers Island escapees who now work as arms traffickers.

Because Keener's whereabouts are unknown, the group pursues his four lieutenants, rogue Division agents who act as warlords in Lower Manhattan, operating from The Tombs, Two Bridges, Battery Park and the New York Stock Exchange, respectively. The Agent eliminates the four warlords and recovers intelligence placing Keener on Liberty Island. The Agent and Kelso commandeer a ferry to Liberty Island, but are attacked by Black Tusk, who have arrived in Manhattan to attack Keener and confiscate his work. The Agent fights off Black Tusk to reach Keener inside the Statue of Liberty Museum, where they learn Keener plans to use a surface-to-surface missile to infect Manhattan with Eclipse, killing everyone, to allow Keener's own new society to flourish. The agent destroys the system and mortally wounds Keener, who activates a signal on his modified Division wristwatch before dying.

Keener's signal activates ANNA, an AI analog of ISAC the now-dead warlord Parnell developed to network and coordinate rogue Division agents across the country. Lau, who is revealed to have betrayed the Division to ally with Black Tusk, assures Black Tusk commander Bardon Schaeffer that ANNA will help them defeat the Division. Back in Haven, Rhodes and Benitez thank and congratulate the Agent but lament Lau's betrayal. Kelso tells the Agent a rogue-agent cell has been activated in Washington, D.C.

== Development ==
Massive Entertainment developed the game in collaboration with Ubisoft Reflections, Red Storm Entertainment and Ubisoft's studios in Annecy, Paris, Bucharest and Shanghai. The developers evaluated feedback from players of the first game and included more game content at launch. The game's endgame development was prioritized; the studio was surprised at the speed at which players consumed the base game of The Division and were left with nothing to do. The endgame in The Division 2 was designed to be more robust and to further enhance replayability. The Black Tusk's invasion offered a different set of challenges from the main game as their AI was designed to be more aggressive and coordinated than other factions. The developers listened to the community's wishes, introducing more character-customization options and including post-launch updates from the first game at the sequel's launch. The game world was designed to be more lived in; players can trigger emergent events by exploring the game's world. To differentiate The Division 2 from the first game in the series, the developers redesigned the game's weapons, mod system and class specializations.

Massive considered setting the sequel in New York City or moving it to another major U.S. city, such as Seattle or New Orleans. It eventually chose Washington, D.C., as the game's main setting. The developers described the D.C. map as a one-to-one recreation of the city. They used the Geographic Information System and lidar data to create the floor plan of the in-game map. The developers said Washington, D.C., offered a diverse set of environments, allowing players to engage in more-varied firefights. The Division 2 has six biomes while its predecessor has only two. Unlike the city blocks of New York City, the spaces in Washington, D.C., were designed to be open and spacious; this prompted the developers to improve the enemy AI, which could now use the terrain to its advantage, flank the player and behave more aggressively. The diverse environment also enabled more-varied level design, the incorporation of natural cover and the inclusion of more interior spaces. The developers made several visits to the city for location research and spoke with its residents to capture the "soul" of the city.

Because The Division 2 is set seven months after the outbreak of a pandemic, Washington, D.C., is in a state of despair, much more so than New York City in the first game. Areas have flooded due to failing infrastructure, and vegetation has begun to reclaim parts of the city. Massive consulted with botanists, first responders and experts in emergency management. The team also took inspiration from real-life disasters, such as Hurricane Katrina, while creating the game's post-apocalyptic world. The developers wanted to explore ways civilians organize themselves during times of adversity, and the player's role is to help rebuild these communities. The developers used environmental storytelling to explore events that occur during the seven months of crisis. D.C. was chosen to raise the story's stakes, being an important symbol of power and nationhood. The depiction of national monuments in ruins create powerful imagery to indicate a complete collapse of society. Ubisoft repeatedly said The Division 2 is "apolitical" and that it did not intend to convey any political message through the game.

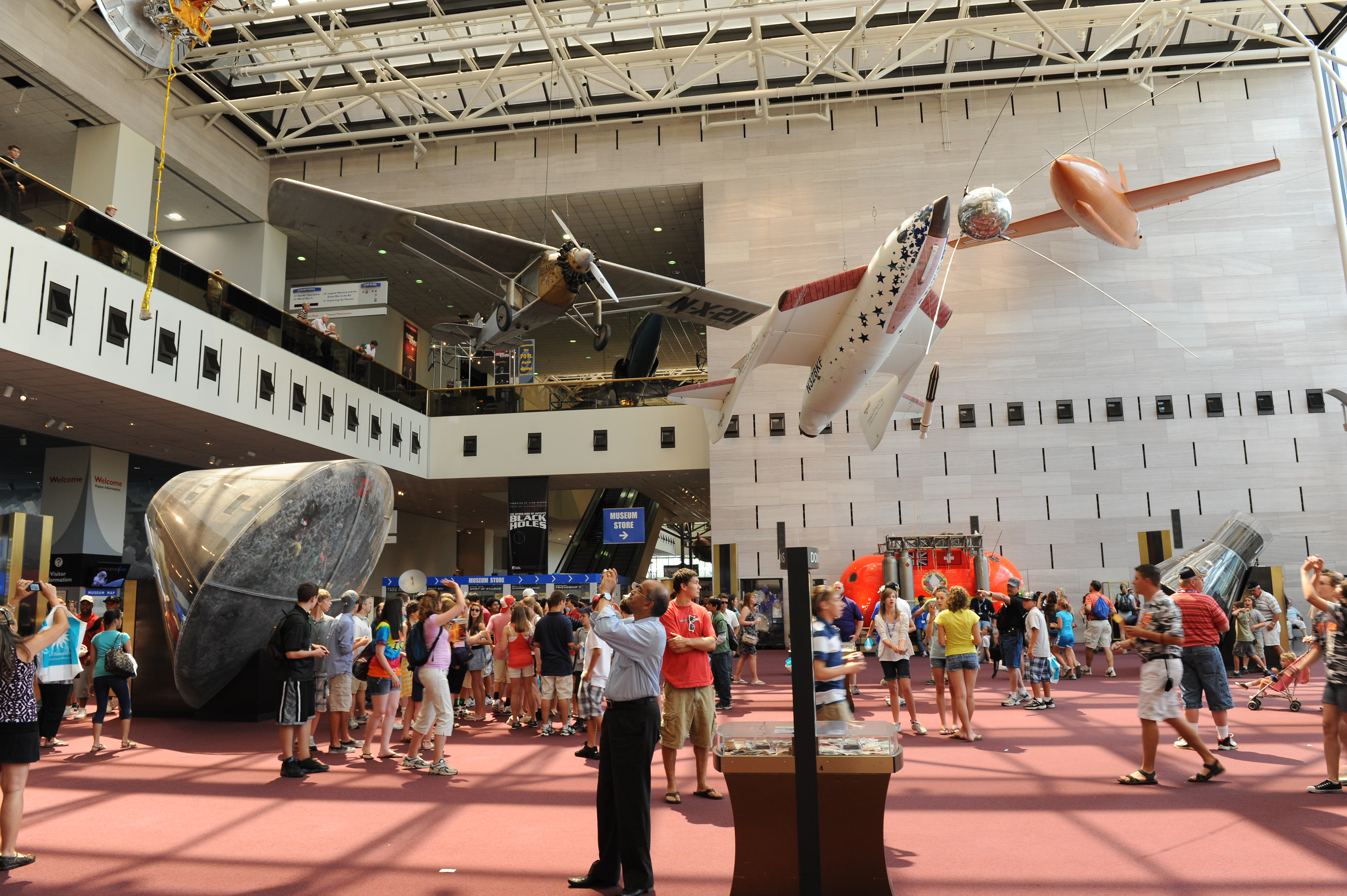
One of the missions in the game takes place inside the Smithsonian Air and Space Museum.

Main missions in the game are set in iconic locations and at major monuments such as the White House, the Lincoln Memorial and the Smithsonian Air & Space Museum. The developers also crafted spaces players would be unlikely to visit in real life, such as a Cold War bunker in one mission. The game's main factions are Hyenas, a gang of "opportunistic raiders"; True Sons, a ruthless paramilitary organization led by former JTF officers; and Outcasts, former prisoners who seek revenge for their mistreatment. Each faction has a distinct combat AI to better establish its identity. Both the player character and enemies in the game will die in a shootout much more quickly than those in the first game because the developers wanted gameplay to be more intuitive and more akin to that of a tactical shooter. Gunplay was designed to be impactful; the developers created more-elaborate and more-visible combat animations.

The developers placed a larger focus on player-versus-player competitive multiplayer than they did with the first game. The Dark Zones returned in The Division 2, though they were designed to attract to a larger pool of players. Gears normalization was implemented to ensure all players can fairly compete, though Occupied Dark Zones were created for players who prefer the first title's gameplay style. While all of the loot collected in a Dark Zone in the first Division game always requires helicopter extraction, second-tier "non-contaminated loot" was introduced to make the experience more rewarding and less punishing. The three Dark Zone locations are Washington Union Station, the D.C. waterfront and Georgetown, with each map supporting different playstyles. Because Dark Zones are set in uninhabited areas, the developers went to Chernobyl to record its quietness in an attempt to create an unsettling atmosphere. The Dark Zones were placed in opposite ends of the map so they can be expanded in future updates. Efforts to entice PvE players to try out Dark Zones were made: the developers rewarded common PvE actions such as stealing supply drops and redesigned Rogue status system. Checkpoint camping was discouraged because defense systems in each Dark Zone will automatically attack players with the highest Rogue status.

In February 2021, an update that improved performance and allowed the game to run at 60 frames per second on the PlayStation 5 and Xbox Series X/S was released for the PlayStation 4 and Xbox One versions of the game.

== Release ==
Ubisoft announced Tom Clancy's The Division 2 on March 9, 2018, and premiered the first gameplay footage at the E3 2018 in June that year. At the Expo, Ubisoft confirmed the game would be released on March 15, 2019, for PlayStation 4, Windows and Xbox One. A private beta was launched prior to the game's release, starting on February 7, 2019, and ending four days later on February 11. Another four-day open beta for the game started on March 1 the same year. The game was released as an exclusive for the Epic Games Store and Ubisoft's Uplay store. It was later released for Steam on January 12, 2023. The game, including all expansions to date, was launched on Google Stadia on March 17, 2020; this version shares cross-platform play with PC users and shared progression between those platforms. The game was also made available on Amazon Luna on November 23, 2020.

The Division 2 was billed as a live service video game, which Ubisoft would support with free updates following its initial launch. After the game's release, three episodes of downloadable content (DLC), which add new story content and gameplay modes, were released. Players who purchased the Year 1 Pass received those episodes early and gained access to several missions known as "Classified Assignments". The first episode, which is titled D.C. Outskirts: Expedition, was released in July 2019 and introduces two new campaign missions in which players search for the missing president and eliminate the leader of the Outcasts, and a three-part expedition set in Kenly College, where the Division must reach a lost convoy with valuable supplies. The second episode, titled Pentagon: The Last Castle, was released in October 2019; this DLC adds two new missions based in The Pentagon and a DARPA research laboratory. In this episode, the Division and Black Tusk agents race against each other to discover a secret in the defense headquarters. The last episode, Coney Island: The Hunt, was released in February 2020; in this episode, the player must search Coney Island for a scientist who may have found the cure for the virus that caused the global pandemic.

In March 2020, Massive released Warlords of New York, the game's first paid expansion pack that raised the level cap to 40, though new players can directly access the expansion as a level-30 character. The expansion closed the story arc established in the base game and its subsequent episodes. It reintroduced two factions from the first game, the Rikers and the Cleaners, and featured a new map based in hurricane-ravaged Lower Manhattan, divided into four districts. Additionally, the expansion introduced new gadgets, an overhaul of the gear system, more-varied boss fights and global events, which are gameplay modifiers. Starting from the game's second year of release, the game adopted a seasonal model, with Ubisoft releasing manhunt targets and gameplay events over a 12-week season. Post-launch support was set to end by late 2020 as Massive shifted its attention to Avatar: Frontiers of Pandora and Star Wars Outlaws. Warlords of New York was more successful than the developers had anticipated, prompting Massive and its co-development partner Ubisoft Bucharest to release more seasons and updates for the game. The developers had to re-run seasons in 2021 and early 2022 before the first major update, "Season 9: Hidden Alliance", was released in May 2022.

On May 27, 2025, a second New York-themed expansion was released, titled Battle for Brooklyn. The release added new missions and a map expansion with two new neighborhoods (Brooklyn Heights and Dumbo) in Brooklyn, which paid homage to the opening sequence of the first Division game. The story expansion was originally set to be released in 2024, though it was delayed as Ubisoft focused on fixing bugs and making gameplay changes. The expansion was designed to be approachable for new players, including those who did not play Warlords of New York. In August 2026, Massive announced the third expansion pack, titled Echoes of Central Park, for the game. The DLC adds a new location and AI-controlled teammates to the game. It is set to be released on November 3, 2026.

A number of game modes were introduced following the game's initial release; Ubisoft also released the first raid named "Operation Dark Hours" in May 2019. Ubisoft described the raid, which is set in Ronald Reagan Washington National Airport, as the biggest challenge for all The Division 2 players, requiring eight players to cooperate with each other and complete a series of objectives. The second raid, titled "Operation Iron Horse", was released in June 2020. On September 22, 2020, Ubisoft released a new game mode named "The Summit" in which up to four players work as a team and ascend a 100-story skyscraper, combating increasingly difficult enemy forces. Season 9 introduced "Countdown" in which a team of four must attempt to stabilize a failing nuclear power station within 15 minutes. In April 2023, the developers introduced the "Descent" mode, which is set in a training simulation; up to four players, either playing solo or together, must complete a series of encounters starting with basic weapons. In the mode, which borrows mechanics from roguelike games, players gradually became more powerful as they acquire talent points. A mode named Survivors, described by Ubisoft as a "survival extraction experience", is currently in development, led by Magnus Jansén, the creative director of the original game. Ubisoft experimented with a battle royale mode that was later reworked into The Division Heartland, which was canceled in 2024. Ubisoft also released cosmetic items and weapons skins based on other franchises such as Resident Evil and Tom Clancy's Splinter Cell.

== Reception ==
=== Critical reception ===
Reception

Aggregate score
Aggregator	Score
Metacritic	(PC) 84/100 (PS4) 82/100 (XONE) 82/100

Review scores
Publication	Score
Destructoid	8.5/10
Game Informer	9/10
GameSpot	9/10
GamesRadar+	4.5/5
IGN	8.5/10
PC Gamer (US)	82/100
Slant Magazine	7/10

Tom Clancy's The Division 2 received "generally favorable reviews" from critics, according to review aggregator Metacritic. The expansion pack Warlords of New York also received generally favourable reviews with the exception of the PS4 version, which received "mixed or average" reviews.

Chris Carter from Destructoid praised the game for its tight satisfying gunplay, and he was impressed by the responsiveness of the game's artificial intelligence. Johnny Chiodini from Eurogamer noted the game significantly expands on the foundations that are established in the first game, introducing new gadgets and interesting changes to customization and gears. Matt Bertz from Game Informer praised the more-impactful gunplay, noting enemies can be defeated much more quickly than those in the first game but called the cover system "finicky". GameSpot's Edmond Tran said the wide range of enemy types forces players to quickly adopt different tactics and called game's combat tense and exciting. The game's progression system, which regularly rewards players with new gadgets and gears, was also praised.

Critics also praised the design of the game's missions and levels, singling out gameplay segments set in landmarks and monuments of Washington, D.C. Massive's digital recreation of Washington, D.C. was praised; Javy Gwaltney from Game Informer wrote that the game "excellently endows a sense of place in the player", strongly praising its playspace design and remarking that the game had successfully integrated its open world and detailed interior environments seamlessly. Tran called the setting an "engrossing, believable, and contiguous open world", and James Duggan from IGN praised Massive's attention to detail that invites players to explore. Writing for PC Gamer, Samuel Roberts wrote that D.C. is much more dynamic than, though not as recognizable as, New York City in the first game. According to Chiodini, the sunny D.C. location is not as atmospheric as snowy New York.

The endgame also received positive reviews; Carter praised its replayability, noting it reuses locations from the campaign. He remarked that Black Tusks as an enemy faction is fierce and that the endgame provides ample opportunities to explore builds and prompts players to work cooperatively. Chiodini described Black Tusks as a very aggressive faction and said reaching the endgame section of The Division 2 feels like "a genuine step up, rather than the start of a long and dreary grind". He also praised the incorporation of world tiers to further increase the game's longevity. Bertz praised Massive for incorporating new gameplay objectives in the endgame and said the core gameplay loop keeps players engaged and invested from the campaign to the endgame. Tran praised the wealth of activities in the endgame and said remixed missions create new combat scenarios that are progressively more challenging. Tran described Dark Zones as "fascinating", saying it "adds additional facets of tension, distrust, and dishonesty" to the game. Roberts noted the three Dark Zones are differently designed and are capable of creating tense, player-generated stories. Duggan expressed his disappointment, saying the sequel lacks the dynamic of the first game. Many critics praised The Division 2 for being feature-complete and having a stable performance at launch.

The game's narrative was criticized. Carter noted the game lacks a strong story and is filled with forgettable characters and faceless enemies. Tom Hoggins from The Daily Telegraph called the story "wafer-thin" and said the game is thematically uninspiring despite its evocative setting. Bertz praised the game's environmental storytelling but was disappointed that Massive failed to explore the pandemic and the fall of the US in any meaningful way in the main story. Tran shared similar views, noting "the opportunity to use The Division 2 to create meaningful fiction is wasted." Chiodini described the story as "awful" and criticized the writers for evoking a "sense of poignancy" without exploring any political themes. He added the game "pulls in these bits of American history with unwavering earnesty and yet manages to say absolutely nothing." Aaron Riccio from Slant Magazine wrote the game symbolizes the regression of the Tom Clancy's brand, a franchise that once dealt with "complex geopolitical entanglements before turning to a modern-day fetishization of guns and violent, paramilitary engagement."

=== Sales ===
On the week of its release, Tom Clancy's The Division 2 was the UK's best-selling game, although its sales figures were 20% of the original game's launch-week sales. In Japan, approximately 63,817 physical units for the PlayStation 4 were sold during its launch week, making Tom Clancy's The Division 2 the best-selling game of any format. In the U.S., it was the best-selling video game of March 2019 and the ninth-best-selling game of the year, according to the NPD Group.

Ubisoft's decision to not release Tom Clancy's The Division 2 on Steam at launch caused six times the number of players to preorder the game on Ubisoft Store compared with its predecessor. The game's sales on consoles failed to meet Ubisoft's expectations; the company cited increased competition in the genre as a cause of game's disappointing performance. Ubisoft added the sales on PC were similar to that of the first game. Tom Clancy's The Division 2 sold more than 10 million copies during the eighth generation of video game consoles.

During testimony in the antitrust lawsuit Epic Games v. Apple it was revealed between May 9 and 11, 2019, 70–90% of the online transactions for the game's downloads were fraudulent; scammers were using stolen credit-card numbers to buy Ubisoft games in the Epic Games Store, which prompted a "profuse" email apology from Epic CEO Tim Sweeney to Ubisoft CEO Yves Guillemot. According to Sweeney: "Fraud rates for other Epic games store titles are under 2% and Fortnite is under 1%. So 70% fraud was an extraordinary situation."

=== Awards ===
Year	Award	Category	Result	Ref.
2018	Game Critics Awards 2018	Best Action/Adventure	Nominated	
2018	Game Critics Awards 2018	Best Online Multiplayer	Nominated	
2019	Game Critics Awards 2019	Best Ongoing Game	Nominated	
2019	Develop:Star Awards	Best Game Design	Nominated	
2019	Develop:Star Awards	Best Audio	Nominated	
2019	2019 Golden Joystick Awards	Best Multiplayer Game	Nominated	
2019	The Game Awards 2019	Best Multiplayer Game	Nominated	
2020	16th British Academy Games Awards	Multiplayer	Nominated	

== Sequel and spin-offs ==
As of September 2023, a sequel titled Tom Clancy's The Division 3 is in development with Julian Gerighty serving as the game's executive producer. Tom Clancy's The Division Heartland, a free-to-play spin-off, entered development in 2020 but was canceled in 2024. Tom Clancy's The Division Resurgence, a free-to-play game for Android, iOS and Microsoft Windows, was released in 2026.
