= Max the Mutt College of Animation, Art & Design =

Career college in Toronto, Canada

Max the Mutt College of Animation, Art and Design
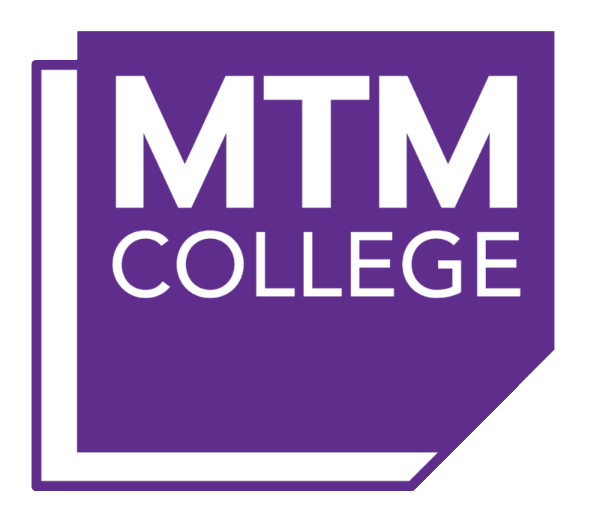
- Type: vocational college for animation, concept art and illustration.
- Established: 1998
- Location: Toronto, Ontario, Canada
- Campus: urban
- Colours: purple and white
- Website: mtmcollege.ca

Max the Mutt College of Animation, Art and Design or MTM College is a Canadian vocational college in Toronto, Ontario. It was established in 1998, and offers both diploma and non-degree courses in illustration, concept art and animation. It is operated by Visionary Holdings Inc.

In 2020 the Ministry of Colleges and Universities reported a graduation rate for the school of 27.5%, compared to an overall graduation rate of 71.9% for all private colleges in the province; employment rate for graduates was 66.7%, with an employment rate in the field of study of 44.4%.
