= Tom Clancy's The Division Resurgence =

2026 video game by Ubisoft

- Developer: Ubisoft
- Publisher: Ubisoft
- Series: Tom Clancy's
- Engine: Unreal Engine 4
- Platforms: Android; iOS; Microsoft Windows
- Release: March 31, 2026
- Genre: Third-person shooter
- Mode: Multiplayer video game

Tom Clancy's The Division Resurgence is a 2026 third-person shooter video game developed and published by Ubisoft. It takes place in the same world as Tom Clancy's The Division and Tom Clancy's The Division 2, though its story is independent of the two games.

The game was announced with a trailer on July 7, 2022, and was initially expected to debut in 2024, but Ubisoft delayed the game multiple times. It was released on March 31, 2026, for Android and iOS devices. The game later arrived on Microsoft Windows in early access via Ubisoft Connect on April 28, 2026, and officially launched on Steam and Ubisoft Connect on August 5, 2026.

== Gameplay ==
The Division Resurgence is an third-person action-roleplaying game set within Midtown, New York, which can be explored by players. The player is a member of the Strategic Homeland Division (or simply, the Division), meant to help restore order after a pandemic of "Green Flu" has caused the United States to collapse into anarchy. Players can carry two weapons, and have access to various gadgets to help combat enemies, such as seeker mines and automated mortar turrets. Like previous games, players can use cover in the environment to avoid enemy gunfire and gain tactical advantages in combat.

The game uses a similar leveling system to the previous games – completing missions, eliminating enemies and exploring the map will garner the player experience and skill points, which will increase the players stats through level-ups and allow the player to invest in certain perks. While in previous games, loot would drop at the player's current level and would not increase beyond that level, any items acquired by the player can usually be leveled up with resources up to the player's current level.

== Plot ==
See also: Plot of the Division

The player agent is activated as a member of the first wave of Division agents after the release of the Green Poison, a contagious smallpox-based disease that contaminated US dollar bills, and deployed to help escort local community leaders to safety alongside a fellow agent as New York descends into anarchy. After helping secure the leaders, the agents then learn that Joint Task Force members have been overwhelmed and their equipment, consisting of heavy machine guns and rockets, have been stolen by the assailants, who are now attacking Trinity Hospital. Working their way through the New York Stock Exchange, the agents arrive at the hospital to find that several of the civilians present have been taken hostage by gang members and were taken to Liberty Island. After securing the rest of the hospital occupants, the agents push towards Liberty Island's cargo yard, where the companion agent is injured, leaving the player agent to push forward. Onboard a docked cargo ship, the player agent takes down the gang's leader, Jax, but is forced to jump off the ship when Jax detonates explosives laid on the ship.

Sometime later, they wake up at a safe house in Midtown, where it is revealed that most other first wave Division agents have either died or went AWOL leaving the player agent as one of a small group of survivors. While a second wave of Division agents have dealt with most emerging threats in the absence of the first wave, more threats remain for the player to assist with.

== Reception ==
Reception

Aggregate score
| Aggregator | Score |
|---|---|
| Metacritic | (iOS) 76/100 |

The iOS version of Tom Clancy's The Division Resurgence received generally favorable reviews from critics, according to the review aggregation website Metacritic.
