= Tom Clancy's The Division =

2016 video game

- Developer: Massive Entertainment (Note: Additional work by Ubisoft Reflections, Red Storm Entertainment, Ubisoft Annecy, and Ubisoft Leamington)
- Publisher: Ubisoft
- Directors: Magnus Jansén; Julian Gerighty
- Producer: Petter Sydow
- Designer: Matthias Karlson
- Composer: Ola Strandh
- Series: Tom Clancy's
- Engine: Snowdrop
- Platforms: Windows; PlayStation 4 Xbox One
- Release: 8 March 2016
- Genres: Action role-playing, third person shooter
- Mode: Multiplayer

Tom Clancy's The Division is a 2016 online-only shooter game developed by Massive Entertainment and published by Ubisoft, released for Windows, PlayStation 4, and Xbox One. It is set in a near future New York City, in the aftermath of a viral pandemic; the player, a secret service agent of the fictional Strategic Homeland Division (SHD), is tasked with helping with disaster relief efforts and assisting law enforcement in Brooklyn and Manhattan, and to investigate the nature of the outbreak. The Division is a third-person looter shooter game with role-playing game elements, and features both cooperative player versus environment and player versus player multiplayer. The game also marked the debut of Massive's Snowdrop game engine.

Tom Clancy's The Division received generally positive reviews from critics. A sequel was released in March 2019.

== Gameplay ==
Screenshot of a player firing from cover

Tom Clancy's The Division is an action role-playing game set in an open world mid-crisis Manhattan with destructible environments that can be freely explored by the players. The player's mission is to restore order by investigating the source of a virus. The player character can carry three weapons, and explosives like sticky bombs and seeker mines to fight against enemies. Players may take cover behind objects during fire-fights to avoid taking damage from enemies, and to give them a tactical advantage when attacking. The game is played from a third-person perspective.

As players progress, they earn experience points (known as XP) and currency. They can use this currency to buy weapons and gear, and use the points to learn new talents and skills. The player's gear is categorized into seven levels: worn, standard, specialized, superior, high-end, gear set items or the rarer exotic items, each with a specific color code. Gear can be either bought, or found as in-game loot, or crafted from gathered materials. The storyline missions involve objectives that are relevant to their respective wing of the Base of Operations, which serves as the player's home base. At the player's home base there are three wings: Medical, Security, and Tech. Playing missions for a wing grants the player points for that wing which the player can spend to gain access to new talents, perks and facilities in the Base of Operations. The player will receive intel videos from each head of the wing at certain progression points, which the player can watch. The intel received is specific to its wing, with the Medical wing giving virus reports on the outbreak, the Security wing giving insight into each in-game enemy faction and the Tech wing providing camera footage. The game features a dynamic, time-based weather system which may bring benefits or disadvantages to players. For instance, storms can hinder player's visibility and make aiming difficult. The game also features a day-night cycle which can change the behaviour of enemies in the game.

The Dark Zone is the player-versus-player competitive multiplayer mode featured in The Division, where a lot of high-end weapons are left behind when the military retreats in the game. It is separated from the main campaign and has its own progression system. Higher quality items can be found within the Dark Zone, but are considered "contaminated"; contaminated loot can be stolen by other players, and must be flown out via helicopter in order for them to be available to the player after they leave the Dark Zone. Players can be accompanied by several co-operative partners and other neutral, player-controlled agents. These people, however, can turn against the player at any moment, going rogue. Players' level and ranking may drop if they die too often in the zone.

== Plot ==
On Black Friday 2015, a viral epidemic, transmitted by a smallpox-based virus planted on banknotes, sweeps through New York City. The disease, known as "Green Poison" or the "Dollar Flu", causes widespread chaos, and major cities across the United States are placed under quarantine. Facing the collapse of law and order, the United States government activates sleeper agents in the population who work for the Strategic Homeland Division (SHD; or simply "the Division"), to assist the Joint Task Force (JTF)—a combined task force of police, fire and rescue, National Guard, disaster response organizations, and civilian volunteers—in restoring order. However, the first wave of agents deployed to New York City goes AWOL, forcing the deployment of a second wave.

The second wave, including the player Agent and fellow agent Faye Lau (Melissa O'Neil), are preparing to deploy to Manhattan when the aircraft meant to take them there explodes, killing the Division Commander and most of the second wave, and wounding Lau. Deploying from a JTF helicopter instead, the Agent reclaims the James A. Farley Building to use as their base of operations. From there, the Agent undertakes assignments to assist and rescue personnel, restore the base to full working capacity, and combat New York City's dominant criminal groups: the Rioters, common street thugs attempting to take advantage of the quarantine; the Rikers, sadistic escapees from Rikers Island; and the Cleaners, Department of Sanitation employees who seek to "purify" whatever they deem infected using incendiary weapons. The Agent eventually recovers a sample of Green Poison, and learns it was a biological agent manufactured and modified by controversial biologist Dr. Gordon Amherst. They also learn of rogue Division agent Aaron Keener, who broke down and defected alongside the first wave to assist the Last Man Battalion (LMB), a private military company hostile to the Division.

Intercepting a signal from the Russian consulate, the Agent attempts to rescue Vitaly Tchernenko, a Russian virologist who claims to have information on the Green Poison; however, he is kidnapped by Keener and the LMB before they can reach him. After helping the JTF secure supplies and weapons, the JTF and the Agent assault the LMB's base, the now-evacuated Headquarters of the United Nations, but Keener and the agents abandon the LMB, taking Tchernenko with them. The leader of the LMB, Charles Bliss, initially escapes in a helicopter, but returns to make a last stand alongside his men and is killed in a battle with the Agent. In the aftermath, Lau informs the Agent that most threats are destroyed or weakened, the LMB was split into factions, and New York City is approaching stability.

Later, an unknown signal leads the Agent to a secluded laboratory, where they find Amherst's remains and learn he died from the Green Poison. The Agent is informed that the information in the lab will further the development of a vaccine and is shown a recovered message from Amherst, stating he developed Green Poison as part of his eco-terrorist plan to decimate humanity to preserve the environment. The Agent also finds a message from Keener, who reveals he intends to develop a new strain of the Green Poison, and offers the Agent a position beside him as a Rogue Agent.

== Development ==
Tom Clancy's The Division was originally being developed as an eighth generation consoles exclusive. Shortly after the game's unveiling, Ubisoft stated that other platforms were not ruled out. Ubisoft asked PC gamers to show interest in the game by signing petitions, and then they would decide. The new intellectual property and tech has been in development for several years although development on the actual game began in early 2013.

During E3 2013, the game was officially announced, with a trailer explaining the results of Operation Dark Winter and the purpose of Directive 51. During the Expo, Ubisoft announced a companion app that allows players to play the game on tablets. Players are able to join in the game as a drone to offer tactical support for players playing on PC and consoles. On 20 August 2013, Ubisoft announced that the game would be released for PC on Windows as a result of the "vocal and passionate PC community." On 7 February 2014, Ubisoft announced that Ubisoft Reflections was co-developing the game and was responsible for developing the map-design, character-design and the online components of the game. Red Storm Entertainment, a subsidiary of Ubisoft that was co-founded by Tom Clancy, was also working on the weapon-design of the game. Ubisoft Annecy was also announced to be one of the co-developers of the game on 8 May 2015.

On 15 May 2014, it was announced that The Division would be delayed until 2015, according to an anonymous source inside Massive Entertainment studio. The Division uses Ubisoft's new proprietary engine known as Snowdrop, which is made for PC, PlayStation 4 and Xbox One. On 9 June 2014, The Division was showcased at E3 2014 with an anticipated release for late 2015. In February 2016, Ubisoft announced that downloadable content for The Division would be timed exclusives for Xbox One.

During E3 2015, the game's final release date and a player versus player area known as the Dark Zone were revealed. Its companion app was cancelled, as the company considered that the addition of drones will bring unfairness to the competitive multiplayer mode of the game. Unlike the previous E3 demo, Long Island, and Staten Island do not appear in the game at launch, while Brooklyn only appears in the opening hours of the game as the tutorial area. The beta was set to be released for the Xbox One in December 2015 and for PlayStation 4 and Windows in 2016. On 7 December 2015, Ubisoft announced that The Division's beta would be moved to "early 2016" and that an Xbox One exclusive alpha would begin on 9 December 2015.

On 26 January 2016, it was confirmed that the Closed Beta would begin on 28 January 2016 for Xbox One and 29 January 2016 for PlayStation 4 and Windows, and end, for all platforms, on 1 February 2016. On 31 January 2016, Ubisoft announced that they had extended the beta, and that it would end on 2 February 2016.

On 9 February 2016, Ubisoft announced that The Division's open beta would begin for Xbox One on 18 February 2016, and for PC and PlayStation 4 on 19 February 2016, and would end for all platforms on 22 February 2016. Over 6.4 million players, across all platforms, participated in the open beta. On 27 February 2016, Ubisoft confirmed that there would be no microtransactions at launch. The Division was released on 8 March 2016, two years after its initially planned release.

There was a promotional short film released on Amazon Prime Video titled The Division: Agent Origins.

=== Post-release content ===
The game is supported by additional content, such as daily and weekly missions, Dark Zone missions and free updates, after the game's launch. The April update, Incursions, introduces new gadgets, a new area called Falcon Lost and updated AI to the game. The May update, named Conflict, adds Dark Zone Extraction Hijacking and the new Incursion - Clear Sky, which was released. The game was announced to be supported by 3 paid expansions. In June, Underground, which includes missions set in tunnels and subways, was released. It was reported that it would be followed by Survival, which adds the Survival game mode. Last Stand was set to be released in the last quarter of the year.

Survival and Last Stand were delayed to late 2016 and early 2017, respectively, so that Ubisoft could focus its effort on fixing the core game's issues, such as balancing and bugs. Survival was available on all platforms by December. Last Stand was released on 28 February 2017.

Ubisoft in March 2017 revealed plans for a second year of additional content with two free expansions. Update 1.7 was released on 15 August including additional features and tweaks. The update added "Global Events", limited-time events with gameplay modifiers that give special rewards. It also adds the ability to customize a character's face, cosmetic items as well as "Commendations" which replaces "Feats".

Update 1.8 was released on 5 December 2017. It adds a new area called West Side Pier as well as two new games modes called Resistance and Skirmish. In Resistance, the player has to fend off waves of enemies. Skirmish is a multiplayer mode where teams of four players have to achieve the highest kill-count.

In December 2025, an update that improved performance and allowed the game to run at 60 frames per second on the PlayStation 5 was released for the PlayStation 4 version of the game.

== Reception ==
=== Reviews ===
Reception

Aggregate score
Aggregator	Score
Metacritic	(PS4) 80/100 (XONE) 80/100 (PC) 79/100

Review scores
Publication	Score
Destructoid	6.5/10
Electronic Gaming Monthly	9/10
Game Informer	8/10
GameRevolution	3.5/5
GameSpot	8/10
GamesRadar+	4/5
Giant Bomb	4/5
IGN	6.7/10
PC Gamer (US)	68/100
Polygon	7/10
VideoGamer.com	8/10

Tom Clancy's The Division received "generally favourable" reviews according to review aggregator, Metacritic. Ars Technica drew comparisons between The Division and Destiny, a first-person shooter game with similar overall mechanics regarding items, crafting, and "shared world" elements. The game was also compared to "modern" massively multiplayer online role-playing games (MMORPG), explaining that "structurally, it all feels like it could have been ripped from Guild Wars 2 or a latter-day World of Warcraft," including "that old MMO staple of being stuck in a server queue before diving into a game" on-launch, in combination with the "quintessential Ubisoft design style" of varying types of collectible and upgrade systems. The Division was criticized for lacking variety in its activities and missions, explaining that it "does little to break from or advance what is fast becoming the general form of the "loot shooter" genre. In fact, it takes very few risks at all, particularly with its enemies and encounter design." The Dark Zone was described as being "harrowing", but was panned for sharing characteristics with the post-game content of Destiny, as being the only means of obtaining higher-level gear that is, ultimately, only theoretically needed for further play in the Dark Zone, and for not introducing any major differences in gameplay mechanics like the raids of Destiny.

Vince Ingenito of IGN was more critical of The Division, outlining that "next to every good thing The Division does, there hangs a big, ugly asterisk". The overall atmosphere was panned for being "barren and unengaging" overall; as examples, Ingenito focused upon the lack of dynamic events in the game world, that there were "long stretches of eventless walking where very little happens" due to the lack of events and encounters, the lack of variety in missions and activities, and that the grid layout of Manhattan made navigation and exploration "tedious". The gun mechanics of The Division were described as being "standard" and more in line with the more realistic feel of other Tom Clancy-branded games, with guns that had distinct feels due to their varying statistics, and that "the fact that the action leans so heavily on smart tactics makes it rewarding when the last foe in a pack finally goes down."

The progression system was also criticized for being "fractured", requiring that players visit multiple locations with different systems in order to upgrade their abilities, explaining that "[it's] hard to accurately gauge just how strong you really are, and as a result, easy to get in over your head in a mission that your character level indicates you can handle." While noting that its "post-game" content was mainly limited to harder versions of story missions with stronger "bullet sponge" enemies, Ingenito praised the Dark Zone for "[fixing] just about every problem I have with The Division's pacing, its lack of player-driven moments, and the overall toothlessness and emptiness of its open world", by adding an "omnipresent" danger and a higher degree of risk to player interactions. In conclusion, Ingenito felt that the game's ideas and mechanics were "not spread evenly or interwoven cleanly enough to form a cohesive, consistently enjoyable loop".

Prior to version 1.0.2 of the game, named enemy NPCs would respawn indefinitely, as long as their entourage of minions were never killed. This allowed players to collect the named enemies' superior and high-end loot over and over again. The most popular target of this exploit was a character known as the Bullet King, as this character was the named enemy closest to any player spawn point in the game. The glitch has been resolved in patch 1.0.2 of the game, released by Ubisoft on 22 March 2016. An exotic weapon (the highest quality weapon), an LMG whose ability allows its user to never reload while firing, was named after the character in The Division 2.

During the 20th Annual D.I.C.E. Awards, the Academy of Interactive Arts & Sciences nominated Tom Clancy's The Division for "Role-Playing/Massively Multiplayer Game of the Year" and "Outstanding Achievement in Online Gameplay".

=== Sales ===
According to Ubisoft, the game broke company records, including highest number of first-day sales (breaking the record previously set by Watch Dogs in 2014), and becoming the company's best-selling game. The Division also broke the industry record for biggest first-week launch for a new game franchise, generating an estimated amount of $330 million globally. The retail version of The Division was the best selling game in its week of release in the U.K. and Ireland, debuting at No. 1 in the UK retail software sales chart. The game's launch marked the biggest video game debut in the first quarter of the year in the U.K., breaking the record previously held by Sony's Gran Turismo 4. It was the third biggest launch of a Ubisoft game in the U.K., behind Assassin's Creed III and Watch Dogs. The game has the highest week one sales for a new intellectual property, breaking the record held by Destiny. The game was No. 1 in Japan, selling over 80,000 units in its first week. The NPD Group indicated that the retail version of The Division was the best selling game in March 2016 in the U.S. The game sold more than 10 million copies during the eighth generation of video game consoles.

== Film adaptation ==
In June 2016, it was announced that a live action feature film adaption of The Division is in development. Jake Gyllenhaal was cast to star in the lead role, and to co-produce the film with CEO of Ubisoft Motion Pictures, Gerard Guillemot. By August, Jessica Chastain was cast in the co-starring role of the film.

In January 2017, Stephen Gaghan was attached to direct, though he left the project in 2018. In April 2018, David Leitch signed on as director. Kelly McCormick, Gyllenhaal, Guillemot, Riva Marker, Chastain and Kelly Carmichael will act as producers for the film.

In June 2019 during Ubisoft's E3 2019 presentation, the company announced that Rafe Judkins was serving as screenwriter. Netflix purchased the distribution rights to the film, and would exclusively release the feature through its streaming service. The project is a joint venture between Nine Stories Productions, Freckle Films, 87North, and Ubisoft Motion Pictures. On February 25, 2021, Deadline reported that Rawson Marshall Thurber would replace Leitch as director due to Leitch's scheduling conflicts with the film Bullet Train but would stay on as producer.

In an interview with producers from 87North, it was reported that the project had been put on hold following the COVID-19 pandemic. They stated that with the similarities to the in-game pandemic, it just felt "too heavy at the moment".

== Sequel ==
On 9 March 2018, a sequel to the game, Tom Clancy's The Division 2, was announced, that was currently being worked on by Massive Entertainment. The game was officially premiered at the Electronic Entertainment Expo 2018 in June 2018. On 10 June 2018, Tom Clancy’s The Division 2 was announced to be released on 15 March 2019, with the game taking place within Washington, D.C. after it falls into anarchy, and six months after the events of Tom Clancy's The Division.
