= Tom Clancy's =

Video games based on works of Tom Clancy

- Current logo of the franchise since 2010 (taken from Splinter Cell Blacklist)
- Genres: Action, tactical shooter, first-person shooter
- Developers: Red Storm Entertainment; Ubisoft Montreal; Ubisoft Paris; Ubisoft Milan; Ubisoft Shanghai; Ubisoft Bucharest; Ubisoft Belgrade; Ubisoft Quebec; Gameloft; Massive Entertainment; Ubisoft Reflections; Ubisoft Leamington; Ubisoft Sofia; Ubisoft Kyiv; Ubisoft Toronto; Ubisoft Singapore; Ubisoft Annecy; Darkworks; Oxford Digital Enterprises; MicroProse; Images Software; Beam Software; Clancy Interactive Entertainment; Kama Digital Entertainment; Grin; Virtuos; High Voltage Software; Next Level Games; Capstone Software
- Publishers: Red Storm Entertainment; Ubisoft; Xbox Game Studios; Gameloft; Argus Press Software; MicroProse; Grandslam Interactive; Hi-Tech Expressions; Simon & Schuster Interactive; IntraCorp
- Platforms: Amiga, Apple II, Apple IIgs, Atari ST, Commodore 64, MS-DOS, ZX Spectrum, MSX, Commodore 64, PC-98, Amstrad CPC, Game Boy, NES, Super NES, Windows, GameCube, Game Boy Advance, PlayStation 2, Nintendo 64, PlayStation, Mac, Game Boy Color, Dreamcast, PlayStation Network, mobile phones, N-Gage, Xbox, PlayStation Portable, Nintendo DS, PlayStation 3, Xbox 360, iOS, Xperia Play, Android, Bada, Wii, Nintendo 3DS, PlayStation 4, Xbox One, Wii U, BlackBerry PlayBook, Palm Pre, Symbian, Stadia, Xbox Series X/S, PlayStation 5

Tom Clancy's is branding used by video game company Ubisoft for a series of video games, most of which are shooters set in modern or near-future military settings, with an emphasis on tactical gameplay. Earlier entries were more directly based on the works of Tom Clancy, but recent ones are more loosely inspired.

Despite the shared "Tom Clancy's" branding, crossovers between sub-franchises are rare.

As of 2025, over 114 million units have been sold.

== History ==
In 1996, Clancy co-founded the video game developer Red Storm Entertainment. He has had his name on several of Red Storm's most successful games. Red Storm was later bought by publisher Ubisoft, which continued to use the Clancy name, though the extent of Clancy's actual involvement with the creation of the games and the development of intellectual properties, if any, was unclear. This game series includes:

- The Hunt for Red October (1987): Submarine simulation loosely based on the novel of the same name. Produced by Grandslam Entertainment for IBM PC, C64, and Amiga.
- Red Storm Rising (1988): Submarine sim loosely based on the novel of the same name. Produced by MicroProse for IBM PC, C64, and Amiga.
- The Hunt for Red October (1990): Submarine sim based on the movie of the same name. Produced by Grandslam Entertainment for Amiga, Amstrad CPC, Atari ST, C64, DOS, and ZX Spectrum.
- The Hunt for Red October (1991): Submarine sim based on the movie of the same name. Produced for NES, Game Boy, and SNES.
- The Cardinal of the Kremlin (1991): Management simulation based on the novel of the same name. Produced by Capstone Software for Amiga and DOS.
- Tom Clancy's SSN (1996): Submarine sim based on the novel of the same name. Produced by Simon & Schuster Interactive for IBM PC.
- Tom Clancy's Politika (1997): by Red Storm Entertainment. Risk-like game based on Tom Clancy's Power Plays novel of the same name.
- Tom Clancy's ruthless.com (1998) by Red Storm Entertainment. Strategy game based on Tom Clancy's Power Plays novel of the same name.
- Shadow Watch (2000) by Red Storm Entertainment. Turn-based strategy game based on the Tom Clancy's Power Plays novel of the same name.
- The Sum of All Fears (2002) by Red Storm Entertainment: Tactical first-person shooter similar in style to Rainbow Six, but based on the Ghost Recon engine. The plot is based on the movie of the same name. Produced by Ubisoft for Microsoft Windows, PlayStation 2, and GameCube.

In 2008, Ubisoft acquired perpetual rights to use Clancy's name and works for video games and other related media including books and film.

== Games ==
Release timeline
1998	Tom Clancy's Rainbow Six
1999	Tom Clancy's Rainbow Six: Rogue Spear
2000
2001	Tom Clancy's Rainbow Six: Take-Down - Missions in Korea
2001	Tom Clancy's Ghost Recon
2002	Tom Clancy's Ghost Recon: Desert Siege
2002	Tom Clancy's Rainbow Six: Lone Wolf
2002	Tom Clancy's Ghost Recon: Island Thunder
2002	Tom Clancy's Splinter Cell
2002	Tom Clancy's The Sum of All Fears
2003	Tom Clancy's Rainbow Six 3: Raven Shield
2004	Tom Clancy's Ghost Recon: Jungle Storm
2004	Tom Clancy's Splinter Cell: Pandora Tomorrow
2004	Tom Clancy's Ghost Recon 2
2005	Tom Clancy's Splinter Cell: Chaos Theory
2005	Tom Clancy's Rainbow Six: Lockdown
2005	Tom Clancy's Ghost Recon 2: Summit Strike
2006	Tom Clancy's Ghost Recon Advanced Warfighter
2006	Tom Clancy's Rainbow Six: Critical Hour
2006	Tom Clancy's Splinter Cell: Essentials
2006	Tom Clancy's Splinter Cell: Double Agent
2006	Tom Clancy's Rainbow Six: Vegas
2007	Tom Clancy's Ghost Recon Advanced Warfighter 2
2008	Tom Clancy's Rainbow Six: Vegas 2
2008	Tom Clancy's EndWar
2009	Tom Clancy's H.A.W.X
2010	Tom Clancy's Splinter Cell: Conviction
2010	Tom Clancy's H.A.W.X 2
2010	Tom Clancy's Ghost Recon Predator
2010	Tom Clancy's Ghost Recon (2010)
2011	Tom Clancy's Ghost Recon: Shadow Wars
2012	Tom Clancy's Ghost Recon: Future Soldier
2013	Tom Clancy's Splinter Cell: Blacklist
2014	Tom Clancy's Ghost Recon Phantoms
2015	Tom Clancy's Rainbow Six Siege
2015	Tom Clancy's EndWar Online
2016	Tom Clancy's The Division
2017	Tom Clancy's Ghost Recon Wildlands
2018
2019	Tom Clancy's The Division 2
2019	Tom Clancy's Ghost Recon Breakpoint
2020	Tom Clancy's Elite Squad
2021
2022	Tom Clancy's Rainbow Six Extraction
2023
2024
2025	Tom Clancy's Rainbow Six Mobile
2026	Tom Clancy's The Division Resurgence
TBA	Tom Clancy's Splinter Cell: Remake
TBA	Tom Clancy's The Division 3

=== Rainbow Six (1998–present) ===
The Rainbow Six series: Squad-based first person tactical shooters, based on the novel of the same name, typically taking place in closed urban environments. 15 Rainbow Six games have been produced so far.

- Tom Clancy's Rainbow Six (1998)
  - Tom Clancy's Rainbow Six: Eagle Watch (1999)
- Tom Clancy's Rainbow Six: Rogue Spear (1999)
  - Tom Clancy's Rainbow Six: Urban Operations (2000)
  - Tom Clancy's Rainbow Six: Covert Operations Essentials (2000)
  - Tom Clancy's Rainbow Six: Black Thorn (2001)
- Tom Clancy's Rainbow Six: Take-Down – Missions in Korea (2001) (Not released outside of Korea)
- Tom Clancy's Rainbow Six: Lone Wolf (2002)
- Tom Clancy's Rainbow Six 3: Raven Shield (2003)
  - Tom Clancy's Rainbow Six 3: Athena Sword (2004)
  - Tom Clancy's Rainbow Six 3: Black Arrow (2004)
  - Tom Clancy's Rainbow Six 3: Iron Wrath (2005)
- Tom Clancy's Rainbow Six: Broken Wing (2003)
- Tom Clancy's Rainbow Six: Urban Crisis (2004)
- Tom Clancy's Rainbow Six: Lockdown (2005)
- Tom Clancy's Rainbow Six: Critical Hour (2006)
- Tom Clancy's Rainbow Six: Vegas (2006)
- Tom Clancy's Rainbow Six: Vegas 2 (2008)
- Tom Clancy's Rainbow Six: Shadow Vanguard (2011)
- Tom Clancy's Rainbow 6: Patriots (cancelled)
- Tom Clancy's Rainbow Six Siege (2015)
- Tom Clancy's Rainbow Six Extraction (2022)
- Tom Clancy's Rainbow Six Mobile (2025)

=== Ghost Recon (2001–present) ===
The Ghost Recon series: Squad-based first-and third-person tactical shooters. Unlike Rainbow Six, Ghost Recon usually takes place in larger, outdoor environments. There have been 15 Ghost Recon games so far.

- Tom Clancy's Ghost Recon (2001)
  - Tom Clancy's Ghost Recon: Desert Siege (2002)
  - Tom Clancy's Ghost Recon: Island Thunder (2002)
  - Tom Clancy's Ghost Recon: Jungle Storm (2004)
- Tom Clancy's Ghost Recon 2 (2004)
  - Tom Clancy's Ghost Recon 2: Summit Strike (2005)
- Tom Clancy's Ghost Recon Advanced Warfighter (2006)
- Tom Clancy's Ghost Recon Advanced Warfighter 2 (2007)
- Tom Clancy's Ghost Recon Predator (2010)
- Tom Clancy's Ghost Recon (2010)
- Tom Clancy's Ghost Recon: Shadow Wars (2011)
- Tom Clancy's Ghost Recon: Future Soldier (2012)
- Tom Clancy's Ghost Recon Phantoms (2014)
- Tom Clancy's Ghost Recon Wildlands (2017)
- Tom Clancy's Ghost Recon Breakpoint (2019)
- Tom Clancy's Ghost Recon Frontline (cancelled)

=== Splinter Cell (2002–present) ===
The Splinter Cell series: action-adventure third-person shooter covert-ops stealth games; lately spawned a line of books written by a series of different authors, all writing under the pseudonym David Michaels.

- Tom Clancy's Splinter Cell (2002)
- Tom Clancy's Splinter Cell: Pandora Tomorrow (2004)
- Tom Clancy's Splinter Cell: Chaos Theory (2005)
- Tom Clancy's Splinter Cell: Essentials (2006)
- Tom Clancy's Splinter Cell: Double Agent (2006)
- Tom Clancy's Splinter Cell: Conviction (2010)
- Tom Clancy's Splinter Cell: Blacklist (2013)
- Tom Clancy's Splinter Cell: Remake (TBA)

=== Endwar (2008–2014) ===
The EndWar series: Real-time tactics strategic war game; set in a speculative World War III, taking place in 2020.

- Tom Clancy's EndWar (2008)
- Tom Clancy's EndWar Online (2015) (closed)

=== H.A.W.X (2009–2010) ===
The H.A.W.X series: Combat-based arcade flight video games.

- Tom Clancy's H.A.W.X (2009)
- Tom Clancy's H.A.W.X 2 (2010)

=== The Division (2016–present) ===
The Division series: Online-only action role-playing third-person shooter video games.

- Tom Clancy's The Division (2016)
- Tom Clancy's The Division 2 (2019)
- Tom Clancy's The Division Heartland (cancelled)
- Tom Clancy's The Division Resurgence (2026)
- Tom Clancy's The Division 3 (TBA)

=== Other ===
- Tom Clancy's Elite Squad (2020) (closed)
