= Rainbow Six Tactics =

Tom Clancy's Rainbow Six Tactics
- Developer: Ubisoft Paris
- Publisher: Ubisoft
- Directors: Elie Benhamou; Martial Potron
- Series: Tom Clancy's Rainbow Six
- Platforms: Windows; PlayStation 5; Xbox Series X/S
- Release: 2027
- Genre: Turn-based tactics
- Mode: Single-player

Tom Clancy's Rainbow Six Tactics is an upcoming turn-based tactics video game developed by Ubisoft Paris and published by Ubisoft. A spinoff of Tom Clancy's Rainbow Six Siege (2015), the game is set to be released for Windows, PlayStation 5, and Xbox Series X/S in 2027.

== Gameplay ==
The game is set during the 10th and 11th years of Rainbow Six Siege. The player assumes control of Paul Bishop, the protagonist of Tom Clancy's Rainbow Six: Vegas 1 and 2, who is now the commander of the Rainbow team. In the game, players must complete various objectives, such as bomb defusal, hostage rescue, target capture, and elimination. Each of the 47 maps is handcrafted by the development team, though enemy placements and objective locations are randomly generated.

Environments in the game are destructible, allowing players to create new sightlines and additional entry points. Each mission begins with a real-time recon phase, allowing players to analyze the map layout and scout enemy locations. This is followed by a breach phase, where the four operators synchronize to breach simultaneously. Once enemies are engaged, the game transitions into a turn-based tactics game. The game features 15 operators from Siege, with each having their own unique gadgets and abilities. Between each mission, players can review the intelligence collected, and upgrade the abilities of the squad. The game also features an optional permadeath mode.

== Development ==
The game is currently being developed by Ubisoft Paris, the studio behind the Mario + Rabbids turn-based tactics series. It will be the first single-player-only Rainbow Six game since Tom Clancy's Rainbow Six: Vegas 2 (2008). The game is set to be released in 2027 for Windows, PlayStation 5, and Xbox Series X/S.

According to creative director Elie Benhamou, Ubisoft identified the core of the Rainbow Six franchise as "intel, planning, high-stakes decision-making, and elite Operators with distinct roles", adding that transitioning the franchise's traditional first-person gameplay to a turn-based format was "smooth" and "natural". Tactics encourages roster rotation through a fatigue and injury mechanic, and introduces mission objectives where choosing specific Operators would yield better outcomes. The Siege team collaborated closely with the Tactics team during its development. According to Ubisoft, players who play both games will be rewarded with "additional value". Ubisoft also saw Tactics as a way to tell a longer-form Rainbow Six story.
