= Tom Clancy's Rainbow Six Siege =

2015 video game

- Developer: Ubisoft Montreal (Note: Additional work by Ubisoft Kyiv, Ubisoft Toronto, and Ubisoft Barcelona)
- Publisher: Ubisoft
- Director: Xavier Marquis
- Producer: Sébastien Labbé
- Designer: Daniel Drapeau
- Programmer: Jalal Eddine El Mansouri
- Artist: Po Yuen Kenny Lam
- Writer: Li Kuo
- Composers: Paul Haslinger; Ben Frost
- Series: Tom Clancy's Rainbow Six
- Engine: AnvilNext 2.0
- Platforms: PlayStation 4; Windows; Xbox One; PlayStation 5; Xbox Series X/S; Google Stadia
- Release: PS4, Windows, Xbox One; December 1, 2015; PS5, Xbox Series X/S; December 1, 2020; Stadia; June 30, 2021
- Genre: Tactical shooter
- Modes: Single-player, multiplayer

Tom Clancy's Rainbow Six Siege (Note: Previously known as Tom Clancy's Rainbow Six Siege X from June 2025 to March 2026) is a 2015 tactical shooter game developed by Ubisoft Montreal and published by Ubisoft. The game puts heavy emphasis on environmental destruction and cooperation between players. Each player assumes control of an attacker or a defender in different gameplay modes such as rescuing a hostage, defusing a bomb, or taking control of an objective within a room. The title has no campaign but features offline training modes that can be played solo.

Siege is an entry in the Rainbow Six series and the successor to Tom Clancy's Rainbow 6: Patriots, a tactical shooter that had a larger focus on narrative. After Patriots was eventually cancelled due to its technical shortcomings, Ubisoft decided to reboot the franchise. The team evaluated the core of the Rainbow Six franchise and believed that letting players impersonate the top counter-terrorist operatives around the world suited the game most. To create authentic siege situations, the team consulted actual counter-terrorism units and looked at real-life examples of sieges such as the 1980 Iranian Embassy siege, which inspired the map Consulate. Powered by AnvilNext 2.0, the game also utilizes Ubisoft's RealBlast technology to create destructible environments. It was released for PlayStation 4, Windows, and Xbox One in December 2015, PlayStation 5 and Xbox Series X/S in December 2020, and Google Stadia in June 2021.

The game received an overall positive reception from critics, with praise mostly directed to the game's tense multiplayer and focus on tactics. However, the game was criticized for its progression system and its lack of content. Initial sales were weak, but the game's player base increased significantly as Ubisoft adopted a "games as a service" model for the game and subsequently released several packages of free downloadable content. Several years after the game's release, some critics regarded Siege as one of the best multiplayer games in the modern market due to the improvements brought by the post-launch updates. The company partnered with ESL to make Siege an esports game. In December 2020, the game surpassed 70 million registered players across all platforms. Rainbow Six Extraction and Rainbow Six Tactics, spin-off games featuring Siege characters, were released in January 2022 and 2027, respectively.

== Gameplay ==
An alpha gameplay screenshot of the game, showcasing the Hostage Mode. Players can destroy structures like walls to spot targets.

Tom Clancy's Rainbow Six Siege is a first-person shooter game, in which players utilize many different operators from the Rainbow team. Different operators have different nationalities, weapons, and gadgets. The game features an asymmetrical structure whereby the teams are not always balanced in their choices of abilities. The base Counter-Terrorism Units (CTUs) available for play are the American Hostage Rescue Team (referred to in-game as the FBI SWAT), the British SAS, the German GSG-9, the Russian Spetsnaz and the French GIGN, each of which has four operators per unit split between attackers and defenders (other units were later added through downloadable content, see below). Players also have access to a "Recruit" operator who can choose from a more flexible assortment of equipment at the expense of having a unique gadget. Players can pick any operator from any unit that is defending or attacking before a round starts, choosing spawn points as well as attachments on their guns but are not allowed to change their choices once the round has started. An in-game shop allows players to purchase operators or cosmetics using the in-game currency, "Renown", which is earned at the end of matches from actions performed in-game. Different gameplay modes award renown at different rates, with ranked matches offering the largest renown multiplier potential per match. Players can also complete in-game "challenges" to get a small amount of renown. Renown gain rate can also be affected by the using in-game "boosters" which gives the player an increase in all renown earned for various duration, starting with 24 hours. A premium currency known as "R6 credits" can also be purchased using real-world currency to get operators quicker in-game, or other cosmetic items, such as weapon or operator skins .

When the round begins in an online match, the attackers choose one of several spawn points from which to launch their attack while defenders do the same from which to defend from. A 45-second preparatory period will then commence wherein the attackers are then given control over mecanum-wheeled drones to scout the map in search of enemy operators, traps and defensive set-ups in addition to the target objective(s), while the defenders establish their defences and are encouraged to do so without having the defensive and target objective(s) details being discovered, chiefly through destroying the drones. If a player dies, they cannot respawn until the end of a round. Players who were killed by opponents can enter "Support Mode", which allows them to gain access to drone's cameras and security cameras so that they can continue to contribute to their team by informing them of opponent locations and activities. Matches last only 3 minutes and 30 seconds for a casual and three minutes for a ranked. Teamwork and cooperation are encouraged in Siege, and players need to take advantage of their different abilities in order to complete the objective and defeat the enemy team. Communication between players is also heavily encouraged. The game also has a spectator mode, which allows players to observe a match from different angles.

The game features a heavy emphasis on environmental destruction using a procedural destruction system. Players can break structures by planting explosives on them, or shoot walls with a shotgun to make a hole. Players may gain tactical advantages through environmental destruction, and the system aims at encouraging players to utilize creativity and strategy. A bullet-penetration system is featured, in which bullets that pass through structures deal less damage to enemies. In addition to destruction, players on the defending team can also set up a limited number of heavy-duty fortifications on walls and deployable shields around them for protection; these can be destroyed through breaching devices, explosives, or by utilizing operator specific gadgets in the case of the former. In order to stop attackers' advance, defenders can place traps like barbed-wire and explosive entry denial devices around the maps. Vertical space is a key gameplay element in the game's maps: players can destroy ceilings and floors using breach charges and can ambush enemies by rappelling through windows. Powerful weapons like grenades and breach charges are valuable, as only a limited amount can be used in a round.

=== Modes ===
At launch, the game featured 11 maps and 5 different gameplay modes spanning both PVE and PVP. With the downloadable content (DLC) released post-launch with an additional four maps from year one and three maps from year two – there are currently 26 playable maps. The gameplay modes featured include:

- Hostage: a non-competitive multiplayer mode, in which the attackers must extract the hostage from the defenders, while the defenders must prevent that from happening, either by eliminating all of the attacking team or successfully defending the hostage until the time expires. A secondary manner of winning can occur if the attacking or defending team accidentally damages the hostage, causing the hostage to "down"; if the opposing team can prevent the revival of the hostage, and the hostage bleeds-out and dies, they will win the round.
- Bomb: a competitive multiplayer mode, in which the attackers are tasked with locating and defusing one of two bombs. The defenders must stop the attackers by killing all of them or destroying the defuser. If all attackers are killed after the defuser is planted, the defuser must still be destroyed for a defending victory.
- Secure Area: a non-competitive multiplayer mode, in which the defenders must protect a room with a biohazard container, while the attackers must fight their way in and secure it. The match ends when all players from one team are killed or the biohazard container is secured by the attackers when there are no defenders in the room.
- Tactical Realism: a variation of the standard competitive multiplayer modes, added with the release of the Operation Skull Rain DLC. The game mode features a heavier emphasis on realism and teamwork, removing most of the heads-up display (HUD) elements, the ability to mark opponents, and the ability to see teammates' contours through walls, while also featuring the addition of a realistic ammo management system. This mode is no longer in the game but some aspects are in the other multiplayer modes.
- Training grounds: a solo or cooperative multiplayer mode for up to five players. Players take on the role of either attackers or defenders, and must fight against waves of enemies controlled by artificial intelligence across various modes like Bomb, Hostage, or Elimination.
- Situations: a single-player series of 10 solo and 1 co-op multiplayer missions that serve as introductory and interactive tutorials to the game's mechanics.
- Outbreak: A limited time event exclusive to Operation Chimera, Outbreak pits a 3 player team in a co-op PVE environment against an extraterrestrial biohazard threat, namely AI-controlled heavily mutated forms of humans infected with said alien parasite. Two difficulties existed for this mode, for which the chief difference was the inclusion of friendly fire on the harder one.
- Arcade: Random limited time events which modify elements of existing modes and is on a smaller scale compared to seasonal game modes, this includes the Golden Gun event
- Seasonal Events: Limited time events which are available for one season. These are normally large scale game modes which are completely unique to regular Bomb, Secure Area, or Hostage Game modes.

== Setting ==
=== Years 1–3 ===
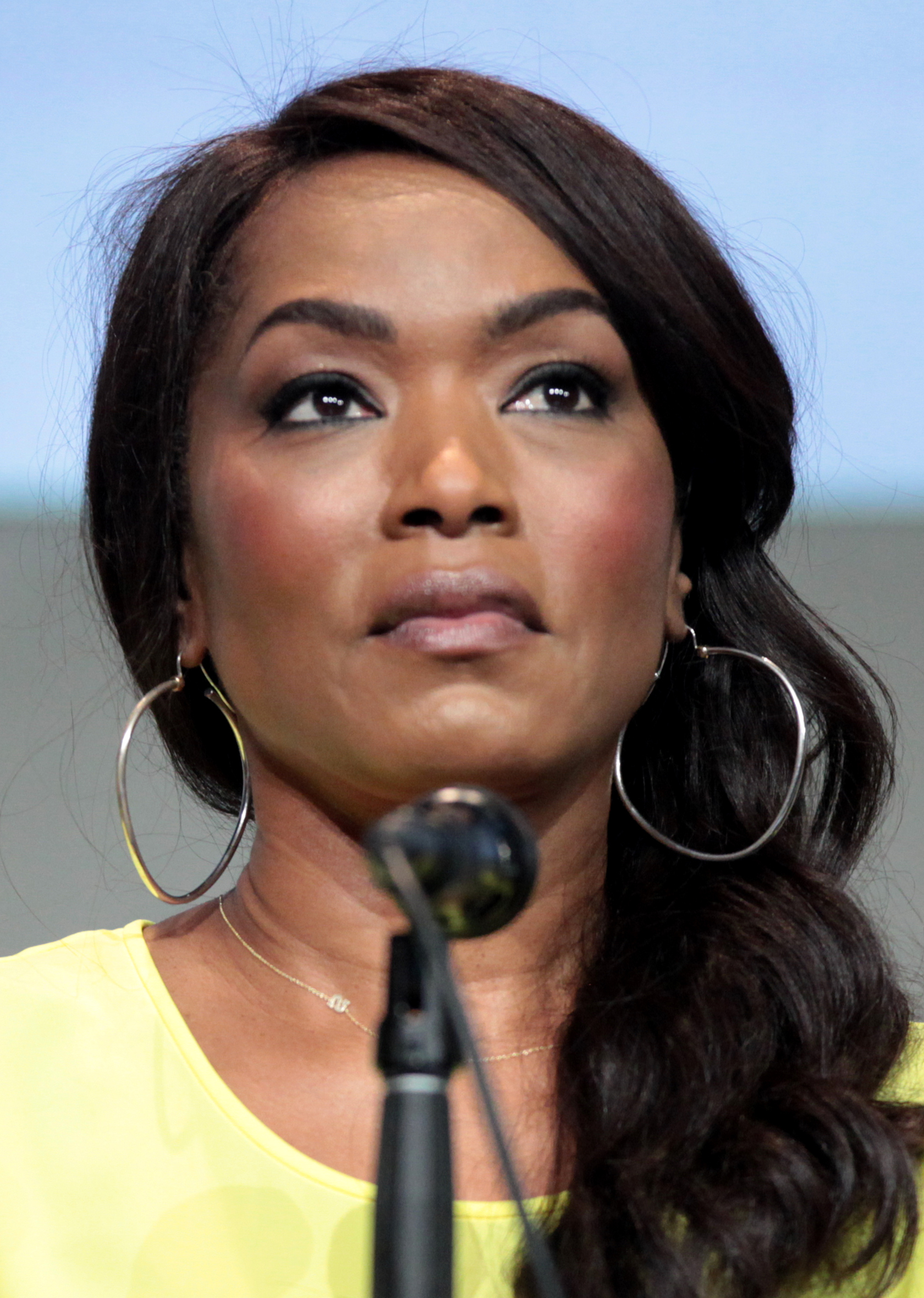
Angela Bassett performed voice works and motion capture for Aurelia "Six" Arnot, the former director of Team Rainbow.

Three years after the Rainbow Program's deactivation, there is a resurgence of terrorist activities, with the White Mask being the most prominent. The terrorists' goals are unknown, yet they are causing chaos across the world. To counter this rising threat, the program is reactivated by a new leader, Aurelia Arnot (Angela Bassett). Arnot, operating under the codename "Six", assembles a group of special forces operatives from different countries to face and combat the White Masks. Recruits go through multiple exercises to prepare them for future encounters with the White Masks, training to perform hostage rescue and bomb disposal. Eventually, the White Masks launch a chemical attack on Bartlett University, and the recruits are sent to disarm the bombs and eliminate the enemy presence. The operation is a massive success, though there are casualties. Arnot affirms that the reactivation of Team Rainbow is the best and only choice in a time filled with risks and uncertainties, and that Team Rainbow is ready for their next mission – to hunt down the leader of their enemy – and they stand prepared to protect and defend their nation from terrorists. Over the next few years, Team Rainbow continues to expand their operations, recruiting more operatives from numerous countries.

=== Years 4–6 ===
In 2019, Arnot resigns from her position to become the Secretary of State and recommends her advisor, Doctor Harishva "Harry" Pandey (Andy McQueen), to take her place as "Six". Harry seeks to improve the synergies of Team Rainbow members; thus he develops The Program, a global training regimen to help Rainbow operators understand each other better, and to expand their operations. To that end, Harry also organizes annual tournaments for Team Rainbow, which are broadcast and viewed globally as public training exercises. Some time later, Harry invites members of a private military company, Nighthaven, to join Team Rainbow, in order to observe their skills and prevent competitors from also hiring them. Nighthaven operatives regularly clash with those of Team Rainbow, due to their difference in battle tactics; Nighthaven's is considered to be more brutal and reckless, with a notable disregard for their own members' safety. This eventually leads to a public dispute between Rainbow operative Eliza "Ash" Cohen (Patricia Summersett) and Nighthaven's founder, Jaimini "Kali" Shah (Yasmine Aker), after Ash was injured during the 2021 tournament finals due to Kali's action.

=== Years 7–9 ===
By 2022, Kali has successfully recruited several Rainbow operators to join Nighthaven, much to Harry's dismay. With a surge in global criminal activities, Harry begins reorganizing the remaining Rainbow operators into several smaller teams, and has them focus on new operations, while also looks into Nighthaven and their activities. Following the assassination of a high-profile tech company CEO, Masayuki Yahata, Team Rainbow investigates his death and finds evidence implicating Nighthaven's involvement. Rainbow squad Ghosteyes, led by Taina "Caveira" Pereira (Renata Eastlick), conducts multiple strikes against Nighthaven and eventually apprehends Kali, who denies involvement in Yahata's assassination while also claiming Nighthaven's weaponry had been stolen prior, only for Caveira to reveal that Rainbow is aware of Nighthaven's innocence; the strikes were to keep Nighthaven from escalating the situation.

Some time later, Harry is confronted by "Deimos" (Dallas Blake), a former Rainbow operative who orchestrated Yahata's death as well as the conflict between Team Rainbow and Nighthaven. Seeking to eliminate Team Rainbow, Deimos claims that the unit has become a disgrace under Harry's leadership, showing him a video recording of an ambush on Rainbow that leaves Ash in a coma before killing Harry. Following Deimos' trails over the next year, Team Rainbow finally manages to pinpoint his next target, with Rainbow members Gustave "Doc" Kateb (Alex Ivanovici), Elena "Mira" Álvarez (Anahi Bustillos), Julien "Rook" Nizan (Marc-André Brunet) and Sam "Zero" Fisher (Jeff Teravainen) confronting and apprehending Deimos. After awakening from her coma, Ash and the rest of Rainbow uncover Deimos' real identity as Gerald Morris, a rogue Rainbow operative who betrayed and killed his squad mate during an operation in 2012 and was declared killed in action. With Deimos' group, the Keres Legion, remaining at large, Team Rainbow recruits retired operative Kure "Skopós" Galanos, who previously worked with Deimos in his Rainbow days. Skopós teams up with Rainbow operative Grace "Dokkaebi" Nam (Christine Lee) to assault a Keres safehouse and retrieve intel pertaining to the organization.

During a training exercise at Hereford Base, England, Rainbow operatives are forced to defend the base from Keres Legion troops, who have infiltrated the organization under the guise of new recruits to break Deimos out of prison and destroy the base.

=== Years 10–11 ===
Following the ambush on Hereford Base, the base is ultimately destroyed by the Keres Legion with several staff and recruits killed, including a Global Security Alliance Council (GSAC) observer named Caron, while Dokkaebi, unbeknownst to Rainbow, was also abducted during the attack. It is further revealed that the attack and destruction of Hereford Base was merely Phase One of Deimos' ultimate plan as "Phobos", the Legion's second-in-command, initiates Phase Two. Realizing the scale of the Keres Legion's threat, Nighthaven, who had disassociated themselves from Rainbow following their actions against the PMC, decides to put their difference aside and come to Rainbow's aid in their fight against the Keres Legion.

After learning that the Keres Legion has kidnapped Dokkaebi, Ana "Solis" Valentina Díaz (AJ Simmons) and Hāpai "Rauora" Iwini, one of the surviving recruits from the assault on Hereford Base, head to Detroit to investigate the Legion's relation with a company named "POLARIS". Encountering enemy forces inside the company building, the two are personally attacked by Phobos who also destroys the building with planted explosives. Escaping the explosion, Solis and Rauora manage to retrieve a tracker that they believe will lead them to Dokkaebi. Rainbow operatives Morowa "Clash" Evans (Sophia Walker) and Monika "IQ" Weiss (Kristina Klebe) (Note: Sandra Kawloski voiced IQ from 2015 to 2021 before she was recast.) are later deployed to rescue Dokkaebi from a Keres Legion hideout. During extraction, Dokkaebi reveals that she has acquired intel on Phobos.

In spite of Rainbow's efforts, GSAC eventually threatens to shut down the Rainbow Program, due to multiple failures and casualties suffered. Team Rainbow is given one last chance to find Phobos and stop him. They deploy a strike team to confront Phobos and his Keres Legion forces, and successfully kill him, ending the threat. Two years later following the shutdown of the Rainbow Program, several intelligence agencies are attacked by an unknown force, leading to former Rainbow Deputy Director Paul Bishop being contacted. Bishop rebuilds Team Rainbow and investigates the new threat, which is revealed to be the Keres Legion, now operating under new leadership. Bishop himself takes on a field operation with Rainbow operatives Dokkaebi and Mark "Mute" Chandar (Gary Milner), and successfully apprehends Keres operative "Nyx".

== Development ==
The game's predecessor was Tom Clancy's Rainbow 6: Patriots, a tactical shooter announced in 2011. It had a focus on narrative, and the story campaign features many cut-scenes and scripted events. However, the game fell into a development hell shortly after its announcement. The game's outdated engine and frequent change of leadership hindered development progress, and game quality was not up to par. In addition, it was planned to be released on seventh-generation video-game consoles which were not capable of processing certain game mechanics. Seeing the arrival of a new generation of consoles, the team wanted to make use of this opportunity to create a more technologically advanced game. As a result, Ubisoft decided to cancel Patriots and assembled a new team of 25 people to come up with ideas to reboot the series.

To make the new game feel refreshing, only certain multiplayer elements were retained as the small team took the game in a different direction. They evaluated the core of the Rainbow Six series, which they thought was about being a member of a counter-terrorist team travelling around the globe to deal with dangerous terrorist attacks – operations which are usually intense confrontations between attackers and defenders. However, the team wanted to fit these ideas into a multiplayer format which would increase the game's sustainability. These became the basic concept ideas for the game. As the development team hoped that the game can be replayed frequently, the team decided to devote all the resources into developing the game's multiplayer and abandoned the single-player campaign.

Development of the game officially began in January 2013. Ubisoft Montreal, the developer of Patriots, handled the game's development, with Ubisoft's offices in Barcelona, Toronto, Kyiv, Shanghai and Chengdu providing assistance. The game was originally called Rainbow Six Unbreakable, a title that reflected not only the game's destruction mechanic but also the mindset of the development team, who had to deliver a game that was once stuck in development hell. According to Alexandre Remy, the brand director, the team was confident in their new vision for the game but very nervous when they revealed it, realizing the change of direction would likely disappoint some fans.

=== Design ===
The 150-person team consisted mainly of first-person shooter veterans or longtime Rainbow Six players. Despite having prior knowledge on how these types of games work, the team decided to study historic examples of counter-terrorist operations, including 1980's London Iranian Embassy siege, 1977's Lufthansa Flight 181 hijacking, and 2002's Moscow theatre hostage crisis to ensure that the portrayal of these operations was accurate and appropriate. The team also consulted counter-terrorism units, such as the National Gendarmerie Intervention Group (GIGN), for their opinions on how they would react during a hostage rescue situation. According to Xavier Marquis, the game's creative director, having a hostage rescue mission in the game helped create an immersive story. By allowing players to assume control of an operator tasked with saving innocents, it gives them an objective and a priority. They must be careful in dealing with the situation and try their best not to hurt the hostage. This further promotes teamwork between players and prompts them to plan before attacking, and further makes the game more realistic, tense and immersive. To make the game feel more realistic, the team introduced a mechanic called "living hostage" to govern the hostage character's behaviour – e.g., coughing if there is dust in the air or shielding him or herself if there is nearby gunfire.

The environmental destruction mechanic was one of the game's most important elements. When the game's development was begun, the developer's in-house team completed their work on RealBlast Destruction, an engine that "procedurally breaks everything down" and remodels the environment. The development team thought that this technology fitted the game's style and gameplay, and decided to use it. This aspect of the game became increasingly important during development, and the team spent an extended period of time making sure that these destructions were authentic. As a result, the team implemented a materials-based tearing system, in which environmental objects of different materials show different reactions to players' attacks. To render the game's texture, the team used physically based rendering, even though it was ineffective during the game's early stage of production due to issues with the game's engine. A material bank and substance painter were utilized to create textures for environmental objects when they were damaged or destroyed. The team also implemented subtle visual cues to help players identify whether a structure was destructible or not, as opposed to "distracting" players with more-obvious hints. The destruction mechanic prompted Ubisoft to change their level-design approach, as they had to ensure that the level was still logical and realistic when parts of the environment were destroyed.

According to Ubisoft, "teamwork, tactics, and tension" were the game's three most important pillars. The team initially worked on a respawn feature, allowing players to rejoin after they are killed in the game. However, following several internal tournaments, the team realized that some of their employees would always win a match. They concluded that the respawn system worked to the benefit of strong players and placed individual skill above teamwork, which did not fit the developer's focus on game tactics. Removing the respawn feature meant greater consequences for taking risks, and players had to rely on their teammates in order to survive and achieve objectives. According to Chris Lee, the game's designer, the team initially worried that the system would only appeal to hardcore players. However, after several testings, they found that the removal of the respawn system provided new challenges to strong players and forced them to cooperate with their teammates – while it rewarded weaker players who were willing to take their time, plan their actions, and be strategic.

The gameplay system was designed to allow players to have a lot of freedom. As a result, the team implemented the "Golden 3C Rules", which represents Character, Control, and Camera. Players are always controlling their own actions and movements, and the team intentionally avoided any animation that would disrupt the players. As a result, actions such as setting explosives, or placing a breach charge, can be cancelled immediately so that players can react and shoot. The game's camera only moves when the player moves, as the team feared that the changes of camera angle may lead to players' in-game deaths. A free-lean system was introduced to the game so that players can have more control over their line of sight. According to Ubisoft, this input-driven control mechanism makes the game feel more "natural" and "fluid". This is because it allows players to concentrate on planning and coordinating, rather than thinking if the camera or environment will interfere with their actions.

Several gameplay elements were scrapped or removed from the final game. One of the features of its predecessors, artificial intelligence-controlled squadmates, were removed from single-player missions. This decision was made because the team wanted players to play with a squad controlled by actual players rather than computers. The team once considered adding a map editor so that players could design their own maps, but this plan never came to fruition. Hit markers, which would indicate an injury inflicted on an opponent, were removed because the team feared that players would abuse the system by "peppering the walls with gunfire" and use hit markers to locate enemies. Players cannot jump in the game, as real-life counter-terrorist unit operators do not jump while carrying out their missions.

According to Louis Philippe, the game's audio director, the team originally used intense music and sounds to create tension. However, the team decided to scrap this idea, realizing that the best way to create a tense atmosphere is to create the sounds of other players, which are often unexpected. The team created Navigation Sounds, in which the sound a player made is determined by their operators' weight, armour, and speed. Gadget deployment such as fortifying and breach-charging create louder sounds that may reveal the player's presence. The team thought that this would be enjoyable for players and influence their gameplay experience. The game's music was composed by Paul Haslinger, who had worked on the score of the previous Rainbow Six games and the Far Cry series. His co-composer was Ben Frost, who debuted his first video game soundtrack with Siege. Leon Purviance assisted Frost and Haslinger in composing the music.

== Release ==
Ubisoft announced the game at their press conference during Electronic Entertainment Expo 2014. In August 2015, Ubisoft announced that they had delayed the game's release from October 10 to December 1, 2015, in order to give additional time for the team to balance the game for cooperative multiplayer play. A closed alpha-testing was held by Ubisoft on April 7–13, 2015, in which players could play an early version of the game in order to help the development team test their servers and core gameplay loops, and to provide feedback. Ubisoft held a closed beta, starting on September 24, 2015, for further testing. The company originally wanted to hold another round of testing with the release of the game's open beta on November 25, 2015, but they delayed its release to November 26 due to matchmaking issues. Players who purchased Siege for the Xbox One could download Tom Clancy's Rainbow Six: Vegas and its sequel, Tom Clancy's Rainbow Six: Vegas 2 for free. To launch the game in Asian markets, Ubisoft announced plans to remove graphic imagery from all versions of the game via a patch. The plan was later withdrawn by the developer due to review bombing and negative fans feedback.

The game had multiple versions for players to purchase. A season pass was announced on November 12, 2015. Players who bought this version of the game could gain early access to operators offered in the DLCs and receive several weapon skins. The game was also released alongside its Collector's Edition, which included the game's season pass, a hat, a compass and bottle opener, a backpack, and a 120-page guide. A Starter Edition was released on PC in June 2016, featuring all content offered in the Standard Edition, and included two operators at start for use plus enough Rainbow 6 Credits to purchase up to two more of the player's choice while the rest has to be purchased through either Renown at an increased cost or additional Rainbow 6 Credits. The Starter Edition was cheaper than the Standard Edition and was initially available for a limited time. In February 2017, the Starter Edition became permanently available via Uplay.

According to Ubisoft, the game adopted a "games as a service" approach, as they would provide long-term support for the game and offer post-release content to keep players engaged. The management team initially doubted the idea but eventually decided to approve it. The title was supported with many updates upon launch, with the company introducing fixes to bugs and improvements on both matchmaking and general gameplay mechanics. To enable players' involvement in the game's continued development, Ubisoft introduced the R6Fix programme in 2018. It allows players to submit bug reports to Ubisoft, which would fix the bug and award the player in-game items. They also introduced an auto-kick system, which automatically removes players from a match when they kill friendly players and launched the BattlEye system in August 2016 to punish cheaters. To counter toxicity within the game's community, in mid 2018 Ubisoft began issuing bans to any player who has used racist and homophobic slurs. All downloadable content maps were released to all players for free. All downloadable operators can be unlocked using the in-game currency though purchasing the season pass enables players to gain instant access to them. Players can purchase cosmetic items using real-world money, but the team did not wish to put gameplay content behind a paywall in order to be more player-friendly. The team avoided adding more modes to the game because most would not fit well with the game's close-quarter combat. Downloadable content for the game was divided into several seasons, with a Mid-Season Reinforcement patch which added new weapons and modified some of the operators' core abilities. This post-release content was developed by the Montreal studio in conjunction with Blue Byte in Germany. Ubisoft announced that they would keep supporting the game and adding new playable characters for 10 more years. As a result, no sequel was planned.

In January 2018, Ubisoft announced the introduction of 'Outbreak Packs', which are loot boxes that can be unlocked with R6 credits (which can be purchased with microtransactions) to gain character items. The company also announced that the base version of the game will be replaced by a bundle named The Advanced Edition, which includes the base game and a small number of outbreak packs and R6 credits. The changes resulted in players' backlash, as existing players have to pay for new content while new players do not. Ubisoft compensated players by giving players a free premium skin for free and announced plans to change the Standard Edition so that players can unlock new operators at a faster pace. In July 2018, Ubisoft announced the introduction of a limited time pack named 'Sunsplash Packs', which are available to purchase with R6 credits and contain cosmetics that have an association with the season of Summer. In October 2018, Ubisoft unveiled the Crimsonveil packs, which added a Halloween themed weapon skin, charm, headgear, and uniform for 4 operators, plus a seasonal weapon skin and a charm that was themed with the skin.

=== Esports ===
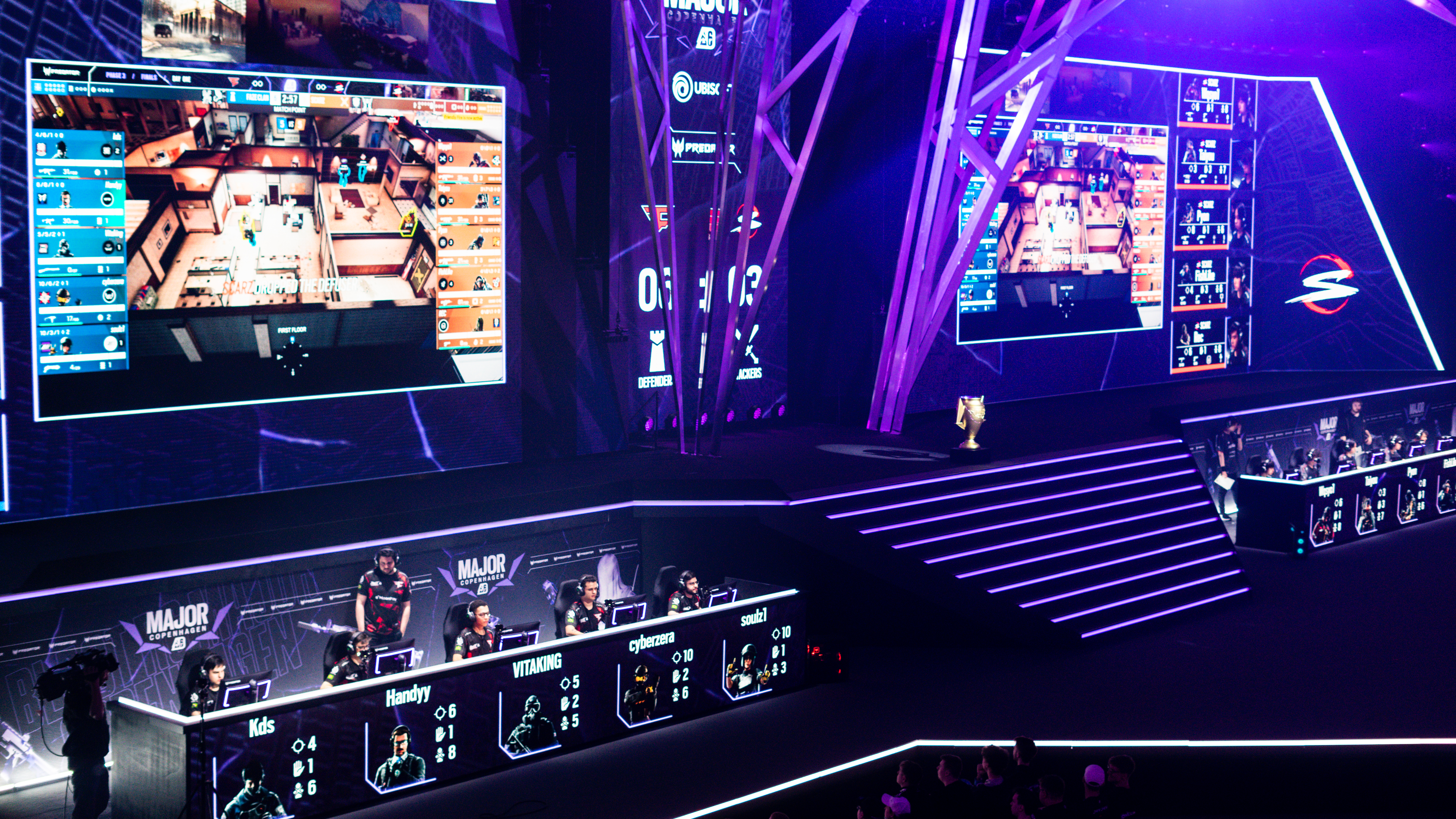
A match between FaZe Clan and Scarz at BLAST Major Copenhagen 2023

Ubisoft also envisioned the game as an esports game. The company had their first meeting with David Hiltscher, vice president of ESL, in late 2013. ESL offered feedback on the game's balancing and helped the developer to ensure that the game was suitable for competitive play. The team focused on introducing new operators to provide variety for esports viewers after the game's release, a decision inspired by modern multiplayer online battle arena games such as Dota 2, as this type of game often has 80–100 playable characters. ESL and Ubisoft officially announced Tom Clancy's Rainbow Six Pro League, a global tournament for Windows and Xbox One players. The competition was held at Intel Extreme Masters eSports tournament on March 4, 2016. A European team, PENTA Sports, became the champion of the first season of Rainbow Six Pro League after defeating another team, GiFu, at the final of the tournament held in May 2016. In 2017, it was revealed that Pro League Year Two would return, but Xbox One tournaments would not be featured. Ubisoft also held the Six Invitational tournaments in 2017 and 2018, in which top teams competed for the top prize. The 2018 tournament attracted 321,000 viewers on Twitch. Both Nathan Lawrence from Red Bull and Richie Shoemaker from Eurogamer compared the game favourably with Counter-Strike: Global Offensive, with both being hopeful that Siege can dethrone Global Offensive's status as the most successful competitive esports first-person shooter in the future. Rainbow Six Siege Year 3 Season 4 was announced on November 18 at the Pro League Season 8 Finals in Rio de Janeiro and was set in Morocco.

The Six Invitational 2020, in February 2020, had the highest prize pool in all of Rainbow Six with $3,000,000 split among 16 teams, with the victors, Spacestation Gaming from North America, taking home the lion's share of $1,000,000. The Six Invitational 2020 also announce enormous changes to both the game itself and the competitive scene. The changes included the end of Pro League and a new points-based system. These changes to the competitive scene have been compared to that of Dota 2 and League of Legends.

=== Downloadable content ===
There have been 42 seasons in 11 years of Tom Clancy's Rainbow Six Siege in the form of downloadable content. In most of the seasons, the downloadable content has usually fixed a glitch in the game, introduced a new map or a rework of an existing one, and one or two new operators to play. The inaugural season began in February 2016 with Operation Black Ice, and the game is currently in its forty-third season, Operation Split Fire, which is the third season of Year 11. There are currently 27 maps between four game modes, and 78 operators to choose from between attacking and defending.

=== Crossovers ===
Rainbow Six Siege operators have made two appearances in another Clancy series, Ghost Recon, in DLC missions:

- In Operation Archangel, a summer 2018 DLC mission for Wildlands, Valkyrie and Twitch travel to Bolivia after Caveira has gone AWOL and is suspected of killing several members of the Santa Blanca Mexican drug cartel, which the Ghosts are working to bring down under the leadership of Nomad and their CIA contact Karen Bowman. The mission escalates into an operation to save Caveira's younger brother João, an undercover officer from the Federal Police of Brazil, from the cartel.
- In Amber Sky, a January 2021 DLC mission for Breakpoint, Ash, Finka and Thatcher in addition to Lesion as point of contact travel to the South Pacific island of Auroa to help Nomad and the Ghosts stop private military contractor Sentinel under the command of rogue former Ghost Lieutenant Colonel Cole D. Walker from manufacturing and selling a chemical weapon called Amber Ruin.

=== Spin-offs ===
In January 2022, Ubisoft released Rainbow Six Extraction, a cooperative multiplayer game in which players must work together to combat and defeat a type of parasite-like alien called the Archæans. Based on the time-limited Outbreak mode of Siege, the game received mixed reviews upon release. In 2027, Ubisoft will release Rainbow Six Tactics, a single-player-only turn-based tactics video game featuring operators from Siege. Set between Siege's 10th and 11th years, the game also features Paul Bishop, a character returning from Rainbow Six Vegas 2.

== Reception ==
Reception

Aggregate score
Aggregator	Score
Metacritic	(PC) 79/100 (XONE) 74/100 (PS4) 73/100

Review scores
Publication	Score
Destructoid	8/10
Game Informer	7/10
GameRevolution	4/5
GameSpot	10/10~~8/10~~
GamesRadar+	3.5/5
IGN	8.5/10; ~~7.9/10~~
PC Gamer (US)	90/100
Polygon	6/10
VideoGamer.com	8/10

Tom Clancy's Rainbow Six Siege received "generally favorable" reviews from critics, according to review aggregator website Metacritic.

The game's multiplayer was widely praised by critics. Chris Carter from Destructoid praised the game's open-ended nature, which made each match unpredictable and helped the experience to stay fresh even after an extended period of playing. GameSpot's Scott Butterworth appreciated the title for allowing players to make use of their creativity in approaching a mission. James Davenport from PC Gamer echoed this thought, and he described Siege as a "psychological race" in which players are constantly trying to outwit their opponents. Ryan McCaffery from IGN also praised the tactical possibilities, which make the game "tense and riveting". The large number of operators available for players to choose were praised by both Carter and Matt Bertz from Game Informer, who commented that they added depths and variety to the game and that players could experiment to see which pairs of operators can complement each other. However, McCaffery was disappointed by the lack of variety of game modes and commented that most players usually neglect the mode's objectives and opted to simply eliminate their opponents. Terrorist Hunt received divisive opinions from critics. Carter thought that it was more relaxing, and Butterworth thought it was exhilarating. However, Bertz criticized its lack of variety, weak artificial intelligence, and its less-intense nature when compared with the player-versus-player modes. Martin Robinson from Eurogamer also noted that the mode only ran at 30 frames per second, which limited its appeal.

The game's focus on tactics was praised. Bertz applauded the tactical nature of the game, as it fostered communications between players. However, he noted that teamwork may not be possible if players did not have a headphone and microphone. Arthur Gies from Polygon echoed these comments, stating that the game's over-reliance on teamwork meant that when teammates were not communicating, the game would not be fun to play. The "No Respawn" system was praised by Butterworth for making each match feel intense, as even the best player needs to think tactically in order to win. Jonathon Leack from Game Revolution enjoyed the scouting phase of a multiplayer match, which encouraged players to communicate with each other and coordinate their attacks. However, Gies noted that the placement of game objectives does not vary much, thus making the scouting phase meaningless. Both Bertz and Butterworth agreed that the game's competitive nature increases the game's replay value. Ben Griffin from GamesRadar praised the destruction mechanic for bringing tactical depth to the game.

The gameplay received mixed reviews. Both Bertz and Griffin criticized the game's incompetent hit detection system, which made the experience unfair. Bertz described the game's gunplay as "serviceable", while Leack noticed a delay in shooting, which drags the game's pace and leads to a steep learning curve. However, Leack appreciated the game's map design, which opened many possibilities. He also praised its attention to detail and sound design, which can often make a multiplayer match feel like a "great action film". Bertz was disappointed by the lack of customization options, which did not offer long-term progression for the players. Butterworth similarly criticized the progression system for being slow. As players cannot play as the same operator in the same match, he was often forced to play as the generic "recruit" character when he was only at the beginning stage of the game. He also criticized the limited weapon customization options, which barely affect gameplay. McCaffery described customization as the "least interesting" aspect of the game and claimed that most gameplay features were locked when players started playing. Griffin, Gies, and Steven Burns from VideoGamer.com were annoyed by the microtransactions featured in the game, with Griffin describing it as a greedy attempt by Ubisoft to make more money, though Davenport did not mind these features as they were limited to cosmetic items and could be unlocked through earning Renown. Bertz was annoyed the lack of clan infrastructure, which may cause players troubles when they were finding matches, while Griffin thought that map rotation often felt random and was disappointed that players cannot vote to decide which map they are going to play next.

Single-player was generally considered a disappointment by critics, with Situations receiving mixed reviews. Carter described it as one of his "favorite non-campaign additions" as the mode gave players incentive to return due to its rating system. Butterworth described it as a "surprisingly robust" mode and thought that there were great tutorial missions that help players to understand gameplay before trying multiplayer. However, Bertz criticized it for its lack of replay value, and Griffin noted their short length. McCaffery thought that it served as a competent tutorial, but its solo play nature meant that players could not practice team play and tactics. Davenport criticized the narrative in Situations, which he thought was not meaningful. Many critics were disappointed with the lack of a single-player campaign or a cooperative campaign, but Butterworth believed that the strong multiplayer components can compensate for this absence. Gies noticed certain network issues would affect the single-player.

Many critics generally had a positive opinion on the package. Bertz thought that the game's multiplayer design had laid a great foundation for the game, but it was not taken advantage of due to the small number of game modes. Leack felt that Siege's tight focus on tactical gameplay had "provided something unlike any other game on the market". Butterworth found the game unique and that there was "nothing else like it" when he put aside the game's minor annoyances. Griffin wrote that the title felt very fresh, as most games in the market did not value tactics. Davenport similarly praised the game for being very concentrated and making no compromises on gameplay design, which in turn make the title one of the best tactical multiplayer shooters on the market. Gies recognized the game's potential but thought that they were overshadowed by the game's numerous technical annoyances, frustrating progression system and its lack of content. Robinson was impressed by the game's multiplayer mode, and that the overall package could be considered as the year's best multiplayer game. However, he questioned Ubisoft for releasing the game with so little content while still selling it at full-price. By December 2020, the game had more than 70 million registered players.

=== Games as a service ===
In May 2015, CEO of Ubisoft Yves Guillemot announced that the company expected the game to outsell Far Cry 4's seven million sales over the course of its lifetime because of post-launch support. At the game's launch, it debuted at number six in UK Software Charts, selling 76,000 retail copies across all three platforms. Critics thought that the launch performance was underwhelming and lacklustre. However, through continued post-release support and updates, the player base had doubled since the game's launch. Following the summer 2016 launch of the third DLC, Skull Rain, the size of the player base had a 40% increase, and the title had more than 10 million registered players. Two years after launch, the game remained as one of the top 40 best-selling retail games in the UK. The strong performance of Siege, along with Tom Clancy's The Division (2016) and Tom Clancy's Ghost Recon Wildlands (2017) boosted the total number of players of the Tom Clancy's franchise to 44 million in 2017. In August 2017, Ubisoft announced that the game had passed 20 million players and that the game was played by 2.3 million players every day. Two years after the game's launch, Ubisoft announced that the game has passed 25 million registered players. As of February 2019, the game had more than 45 million registered players.

Critics agreed that while the game suffered a rocky launch, Ubisoft's efforts in updating the game and fixing bugs have increased the game's quality and had transformed the game into a better experience. IGN and Eurogamer re-reviewed the game in 2018 and both concluded that the game had improved significantly since its launch. Several years after the game's launch, Siege was regarded as one of the best multiplayer games released for PlayStation 4 and Xbox One by some critics, with praise being directed to its distinctiveness and the similarities it shares with multiplayer online battle arena games and hero shooters.

According to Remy, the team focused on players retention in the year after the game's launch, but the growth of the game's player base exceeded their expectations. He called the game "a testament" to the games as a service model. Jeff Grubb from VentureBeat attributed Siege's high player retention rate and successful eSports events to Ubisoft's continuous and frequent updates to the game. GameSpot described Siege as "one of modern AAA gaming's biggest comebacks", and the best proof to show that the "games-as-a-service" model works well, attributing its success to Ubisoft's continuous updates and the thriving community. Haydn Taylor from Gameindustry.biz praised Ubisoft's monetization methods, which was less aggressive than other gaming companies like Electronic Arts. Unlike titles such as Star Wars Battlefront II (2017), the game's monetization methods and the use of loot boxes generated minimal amount of backlash from players. He added that Ubisoft had shown, with Siege, "the delicate and reasoned approach that's been missing from the industry's clumsy, heavy-handed adoption of the games-as-a-service model". The post-launch success for Siege further solidified Ubisoft's belief in the model. Future Ubisoft multiplayer-focused titles – such as For Honor – adopted this structure, in which the company would provide free DLC and updates several years after the game's official release.

=== Awards ===
Year	Award	Category	Result	Ref.
2014	Game Critics Awards	Best of Show	Nominated	
2014	Game Critics Awards	Best PC Game	Won	
2014	Game Critics Awards	Best Action Game	Nominated	
2014	Game Critics Awards	Best Online Multiplayer Game	Nominated	
2015	Game Critics Awards	Best PC Game	Nominated	
2015	Game Critics Awards	Best Action Game	Nominated	
2015	Game Critics Awards	Best Online Multiplayer Game	Nominated	
2016	Golden Joystick Awards 2016	Best Multiplayer Game	Nominated	
2016	The Game Awards 2016	Best Multiplayer Game	Nominated	
2017	Golden Joystick Awards 2017	Esports Game of the Year	Nominated	
2017	The Game Awards 2017	Best Ongoing Game	Nominated	
2018	14th British Academy Games Awards	Evolving Game	Nominated	
2018	Game Critics Awards	Best Ongoing Game	Nominated	
2018	Golden Joystick Awards 2018	Still Playing Award	Nominated	
2018	Golden Joystick Awards 2018	Esports Game of the Year	Nominated	
2018	The Game Awards 2018	Best Ongoing Game	Nominated	
2018	Gamers' Choice Awards	Fan Favorite Shooter Game	Nominated	
2018	The Steam Awards	The "Better With Friends" Award	Won	
2019	15th British Academy Games Awards	Evolving Game	Nominated	
2019	Golden Joystick Awards 2019	Still Playing Award	Nominated	
2019	Golden Joystick Awards 2019	Esports Game of the Year	Nominated	
2019	The Game Awards 2019	Best Ongoing Game	Nominated	
2019	The Game Awards 2019	Best Community Support	Nominated	
2019	The Steam Awards	The "Labor of Love" Award	Nominated	
2020	Famitsu Dengeki Game Awards 2019	Best eSports Game	Nominated	
2022	33rd GLAAD Media Awards	Outstanding Video Game	Nominated	
2025	Golden Joystick Awards	Still Playing Award - PC and Console	Nominated	

=== Controversy ===
On November 2, 2018, Ubisoft Montreal announced they were going to make "aesthetic changes" to Tom Clancy's Rainbow Six Siege by removing references to death, sex, and gambling in order to comply with regulations of Asian countries. However, the announcement generated opposition from the gaming community who believed the changes were going to be made for the game's upcoming release in China, likening the move to censorship. Because of pressure from the community, Ubisoft Montreal announced on November 21 that they were reversing the decision to make the changes, "We have been following the conversation with our community closely over the past couple of weeks, alongside regular discussions with our internal Ubisoft team, and we want to ensure that the experience for all our players, especially those that have been with us from the beginning, remains as true to the original artistic intent as possible."

Ubisoft filed a lawsuit against the Chinese developers Ejoy as well as Apple and Google in May 2020, based on Ejoy's mobile game Area F2, which Ubisoft claimed was a clone of Siege. Ubisoft stated that "Virtually every aspect of [Area F2] is copied from [Siege], from the operator selection screen to the final scoring screen and everything in between". Ubisoft claimed they had attempted to have the game removed from Apple and Google's respective app stores but they failed to grant the removal, and as Area F2 was a free-to-play game with microtransactions, the two companies were financially benefiting from the copyright violation, and thus included in the lawsuit.

During the Six Invitational 2022, Ubisoft announced that one of its upcoming majors for the game would take place in the United Arab Emirates, drawing criticism because of the UAE's treatment of LGBTQ+ people and concern for the safety of Ubisoft's LGBTQ+ personnel and players. Days later, Ubisoft announced their "decision to move the Six Major of August 2022 to another Rainbow Six Esports region" due to the response from the fanbase.

During the Six Invitational 2025 event, Ubisoft revealed a new operator named Rauora originating from Christchurch, New Zealand. Fans soon noticed that the operator's origin and birthday of March 15 was in reference to the Christchurch terrorist mosque shootings in which 51 victims were killed by a white supremacist. Ubisoft later retracted the "oversight" after the reveal caused heated discussion as to whether the date and origin of the new operator was intentional. A Ubisoft spokesperson later stated "We apologise for the oversight and have taken immediate steps to change the birth date [...] The change has been made on the game’s website and will be implemented in the game via an update on March 4". The operator's birthday was subsequently changed to May 11.
