= David Michaels (author) =

Author alias for Ubisoft novels

"David Michaels" is a pseudonym for the authors of novels in the Splinter Cell, EndWar, Ghost Recon, and H.A.W.X series, all of which were created by Ubisoft and developed under Ubisoft's Tom Clancy license. The novel series began as video games for various console systems as well as the PC. As of February 2011, "Michaels" has released six Splinter Cell novels, two EndWar novels, two Ghost Recon novels, and one H.A.W.X novel.

The first two Splinter Cell novels were written by Raymond Benson. However, in 2006, Benson announced he was finished with Splinter Cell and that the next novel would be written by a different author under the same pseudonym. The last known author is Grant Blackwood. The current author is unknown, but he uses the David Michaels pseudonym. With the publication of Splinter Cell: Blacklist Aftermath in 2013, Peter Telep assumed the role of writer for the series. Unlike the previous "David Michaels" novels, Telep is credited on Blacklist Aftermath by name.

== Books ==
Splinter Cell

- Tom Clancy's Splinter Cell (2004); Written by Raymond Benson.
- Tom Clancy's Splinter Cell: Operation Barracuda (2005); Written by Raymond Benson.
- Tom Clancy's Splinter Cell: Checkmate (2006); Written by Grant Blackwood.
- Tom Clancy's Splinter Cell: Fallout (2007); Written by Grant Blackwood.
- Tom Clancy's Splinter Cell: Conviction (2009); Written by Peter Telep.
- Tom Clancy's Splinter Cell: Endgame (2009); Written by Peter Telep.

EndWar

- Tom Clancy's EndWar (2008)
- Tom Clancy's EndWar: The Hunted (2011)

Ghost Recon

- Tom Clancy's Ghost Recon (2008)
- Tom Clancy's Ghost Recon: Combat Ops (2011)

H.A.W.X

- Tom Clancy's H.A.W.X. (2009)

== See also ==
- EndWar
- Ghost Recon
- H.A.W.X
- Splinter Cell
