= Tom Clancy's EndWar Online =

2015 video game

- Developer: Ubisoft Shanghai
- Publisher: Ubisoft
- Series: Tom Clancy's
- Platforms: Windows, Mac OS X
- Release: December 3, 2015
- Genres: MMO, browser-based
- Mode: Multiplayer

Tom Clancy's EndWar Online was a free-to-play tactical strategy massively multiplayer online video game developed by Ubisoft Shanghai and published by Ubisoft for Microsoft Windows and Mac OS X. It was first announced in 2013 and launched into open beta on December 3, 2015 as a return to the original game, 2008's Tom Clancy's EndWar, despite its commercial failure. The game carried forward its post-World War III settings, strategic warfare mechanics, and faction-based conflict.

Tom Clancy's EndWar Online's servers were officially shut down on October 31, 2016.

== Gameplay ==
As a browser-based game, players assumed the role of a surviving faction leader in the aftermath of a global war, with the goal of reclaiming territory and resources, and combined single-player PvE missions with competitive PvP modes where players would deploy units in real time against opponents. Battles were relatively quick, focusing on positioning and counter play rather than micromanagement: the developer described units being sent down paths, with the enemy countering using different unit types (e.g. helicopters, tanks, anti-air) in rock-paper-scissors fashion. It rendered 3D graphics via a Flash-based plugin, aiming to bring console-style strategy into the browser environment. Players also managed a headquarters, upgrading structures and specializing features as they progressed. Among the PvP modes was “Fortress” with leaderboards and special currencies, and “Wargame”, a mode in which players endured consecutive battles with losses culminating a run. The open beta update that launched version 1.0 added Wargame mode, introduced Rank 5 Tank commanders (which it was available via in-game purchase), lowered requirements for Castle/“Fortress” mode, and included UI and performance optimizations. Over time, updates refined matchmaking, shifting from commander power to ranking, improved battle history analysis, and polished visuals and world map interfaces. Players will then have access to a number of content including each with their own campaigns. The game was entered into a beta stage including unit upgrades and a new Special Operations PVE mode on September 2, 2015.

On August 25, 2016, Ubisoft announced the decision to close the game on October 31, 2016, cited for underperformance and a focus shift to other projects. Many players saw the game as a failed experiment which it was unable to extend EndWar franchise. All in-game purchases ceased prior to shutdown, and the website infrastructure, forums, and social media tied to the game were also retired. Ubisoft’s broader pattern of retiring older online services was also evident, with EndWar Online among several titles announced in the same period to be decommissioned. The game had a short-lived lifespan and was no longer playable.

== Development ==
The project was first revealed in September 2013, with Ubisoft Shanghai as lead developer and Ubisoft’s stated rationale for making a browser version was to connect more players through a shared “Theater of War” persistent environment, something harder to unify across individual consoles or platforms. At announcement, Ubisoft emphasized bringing many units (infantry, tanks, helicopters, drones) and more than 80 hero/commander units, supporting both PC and Mac via browser. During development, updates such as Alpha 0.5.0 brought back the HQ component, added new PvP structures, and revamped UI elements alongside new VIP system and multiple additional improvements.

== Reception ==
MMOs.com reviewed Tom Clancy's EndWar Online and gave it 3 out of 5.
