= Tom Clancy's Ghost Recon: Island Thunder =

2002 video game

- Developer: Red Storm Entertainment
- Publisher: Ubi Soft
- Writer: Richard Dansky
- Composer: Bill Brown
- Series: Tom Clancy's Ghost Recon
- Platforms: Windows, Xbox
- Release: Windows: NA: September 24, 2002; EU: November 15, 2002; Xbox: NA: August 5, 2003; EU: September 5, 2003
- Genre: Tactical shooter
- Modes: Single-player, multiplayer

Tom Clancy's Ghost Recon: Island Thunder is a 2002 expansion pack for Tom Clancy's Ghost Recon developed by Red Storm Entertainment and published by Ubi Soft for Microsoft Windows and Xbox. It is also a playable campaign in Tom Clancy's Ghost Recon: Jungle Storm, a game released for the PlayStation 2 and N-Gage systems. Set in an alternate democratizing Cuba two years after the events of the base game, Island Thunder follows the "Ghosts", an elite special forces unit of the United States Army, as they intervene in electoral fraud by a communist party that escalates into terrorism when they lose the election.

Ghost Recon: Island Thunder was playable online until the termination of Xbox Live in April 2010. Island Thunder is still playable online using the unofficial replacement Xbox Live server system Insignia.

== Gameplay ==
A new feature introduced in Island Thunder is the combat point system. Every time a character survives a mission they earn combat points. These points are used to further advance the characters in-game abilities including the strength of their weapons, how successfully they are able to move around enemies without being seen, how many hits they can sustain before dying, and their leadership (the stats of a fireteam member under a leader with a high leadership rating will be increased).

== Plot ==
In 2010, four years after Fidel Castro's death and the ousting of the ruling Communist Party, Cuba is undergoing a promising decommunization and democratization process and is scheduled to host their first free and fair election since 1948. Among the parties is El Frente Democratico de la Gente (FDG; "People's Democratic Front"), an anti-American Marxist–Leninist faction led by Ariel Priego that seeks to return Cuba to a one-party dictatorship. When intelligence reveals the FDG is using political violence, crime, and fraud to rig the election in their favor, the United States covertly deploys the Ghosts to Cuba to quell the FDG's activities.

In Cuba, the Ghosts quickly target arms trafficking and drug smuggling operations by agents and allies of Priego to reduce his ability to forcibly influence voters. On election day, the Ghosts are tasked with providing security in Cienfuegos, and successfully repel an FDG-sponsored attack on the voting center at the town hall and a related hostage situation. The revelation of the FDG's illicit activities leads to their landslide defeat in the election. An angry Priego appeals to his backers in the Revolutionary Armed Forces of Colombia (FARC) to send militants to overthrow the Cuban government and install him as dictator by force, but the Ghosts repel the attack, and FARC ultimately abandons Priego to cut its losses.

Desperate and cornered, Priego flees to an old fortress in a hilled section of Cuba. The Ghosts are ordered to assault the fortress and capture Priego alive, to ensure he is not martyred by FDG extremists. The Ghosts succeed, destroying Priego's escape helicopter, killing his guards, and taking Priego into custody.

== Reception ==
Reception

Aggregate scores
Aggregator	Score
GameRankings	(Xbox) 81.65% (PC) 81.59%
Metacritic	(PC) 82/100 (Xbox) 81/100

Review scores
Publication	Score
AllGame	4/5
Edge	7/10
Electronic Gaming Monthly	7.17/10
Eurogamer	8/10
Famitsu	31/40
Game Informer	8.25/10
GamePro	4.5/5
GameSpot	(PC) 8.1/10 (Xbox) 7.9/10
GameSpy	3/5
GameZone	(PC) 8.8/10 (Xbox) 8.7/10
IGN	8.4/10
Official Xbox Magazine (US)	9/10
PC Gamer (US)	80%
The Village Voice	8/10

Tom Clancy's Ghost Recon: Island Thunder was met with positive reception. GameRankings and Metacritic gave it a score of 81.59% and 82 out of 100 for the PC version, and 81.65% and 81 out of 100 for the Xbox version.

Combined sales of Island Thunder and Tom Clancy's Ghost Recon: Jungle Storm reached 1.1 million copies by the end of March 2004.
