= Tom Clancy's Rainbow Six: Lone Wolf =

2002 video game

- Developers: Rebellion Developments; Red Storm Entertainment
- Publisher: Ubi Soft
- Series: Tom Clancy's Rainbow Six
- Platform: PlayStation
- Release: July 4, 2002
- Genre: Tactical shooter
- Mode: Single-player

Tom Clancy's Rainbow Six: Lone Wolf is a 2002 tactical shooter video game developed by Rebellion Developments and Red Storm Entertainment and published by Ubi Soft for the PlayStation. Part of the Rainbow Six series, it was released on July 4, 2002 and takes place before Tom Clancy's Rainbow Six: Rogue Spear.

== Gameplay ==
Unlike earlier entries in the series, Tom Clancy's Rainbow Six: Lone Wolf features only a solo-focused first‑person tactical shooter experience which is without the series' traditional squad pre‑planning. The player controls Domingo "Ding" Chavez alone through all missions. The game features eight new weapons. There are two pieces of equipment, a flashbang and a M26 grenade launcher.

Despite its streamlined design, the game is noted for being very difficult, with only five missions and a short runtime, similar in length to Tom Clancy's Rainbow Six's expansion pack Eagle Watch (released in 1999). Some critics described the controls as either outdated or clumsy, though others found it surprisingly enjoyable given the console's limitations.

== Plot ==
In January 2001, RAINBOW operative Ding Chavez is dispatched to Norway via a tip from the convicted terrorist Xander Thiessan, who is revealing information on American weapons being smuggled into Russia. Acting alone, Chavez meets Thiessan and orchestrates the capture of the terrorist before infiltrating and assaulting the smuggling network's Norse base. The game follows the five missions in the campaign. Fictional characters John Clark and Kevin Sweeney appear in the game as control personnel in the briefing screen.

== Reception ==
Reception

Review scores
| Publication | Score |
|---|---|
| GameZone | 6.5/10 |
| Jeuxvideo.com | 10/20 |

The Pixel Empire offered a retrospective of critique and concluded with a harsh overall rating of 2/10. The review praised the graphics for their visual fidelity, weather effects, and detailed environments, but they sharply criticized the gameplay, audio, and especially longevity.

GameZone gave Tom Clancy's Rainbow Six: Lone Wolf a 6.5/10. Jeuxvideo.com rated the game 10/20.
