= Tom Clancy's Rainbow Six: Take-Down – Missions in Korea =

2001 video game

Tom Clancy's Rainbow Six: Take-Down - Missions in Korea
- Developer(s): Kama Digital Entertainment
- Publisher(s): Kama Digital Entertainment
- Series: Tom Clancy's Rainbow Six
- Engine: Tom Clancy's Rainbow Six: Rogue Spear
- Platform(s): Windows
- Release: KOR: June 2001
- Genre(s): Tactical shooter
- Mode(s): Single-player, multiplayer

Tom Clancy's Rainbow Six: Take-Down – Missions in Korea is a 2001 tactical first-person shooter video game developed and published by Kama Digital Entertainment in cooperation with Red Storm Entertainment and Ubi Soft. A non-canon spinoff of the Rainbow Six franchise, Take-Down was only released in South Korea for Microsoft Windows. The game's plot follows the international counterterrorist organization Rainbow as they handle terrorism and organized crime in South Korea.

== Gameplay ==
Take-Down's gameplay is essentially the same as Rainbow Six: Rogue Spear, but adapted for South Korean interests, including South Korean Rainbow operatives, additional maps, new uniforms, and South Korean weapons. The game's plot is also different, set almost entirely in South Korea, and has a much shorter campaign, with only eight missions (plus two bonus missions) as opposed to Rogue Spear's eighteen missions.

== Plot ==
Take-Down is set in an alternate universe where all Rogue Spear expansions from Covert Ops Essentials onward did not happen. Take-Down is not considered canon to the Rainbow Six series.

In 2003, Rainbow, led by John Clark, works alongside the South Korean "Special Response Team" (consisting of counterterrorism operatives from the National Police Agency, 707th Special Mission Battalion, and National Intelligence Service) and their advisor Cho Hyung-Jin, to respond to a series of attacks committed by Palestinian anti-American terrorist group ATX. When ATX takes a United States Forces Korea colonel hostage in Seoul, Rainbow rescues him, but are suspicious as to how they attacked South Korea, as they were previously considered bankrupt.

Rainbow and the SRT soon find a connection between ATX, the yakuza organization "Ikeshita-gumi", and ecstasy smuggling between South Korea and Japan. They learn of Kim "Yasuo" Suk-won, a Zainichi who worked as a successful hitman for Ikeshita-gumi until he was framed by Ikeshita-gumi's second-in-command Takao, due to them viewing Suk-won as a threat. Exiled to South Korea, Suk-won and his friend Takahashi exacted their revenge by anonymously informing South Korean authorities of Ikeshita-gumi's ecstasy smuggling operations, allowing police to seize 550 kilograms of ecstasy from Ikeshita-gumi. Ikeshita-gumi then hired ATX and sent them to South Korea, apparently as a distraction, while Takao, head hitman Sasamoto, and around 100 other yakuza hitmen went there separately to take back the confiscated ecstasy and locate the informant.

Rainbow and the SRT investigate antiques dealer Choi Tae-ho, suspected of being a local organizer for Ikeshita-gumi. After infiltrating his villa and surveilling his movements, police surround him in Insa-dong while he meets with Takao, and Rainbow kills them after they take hostages in a museum. Meanwhile, Ikeshita-gumi learns Suk-won was the informant and uses Takahashi to lure him to Chuncheon. Suk-won escapes his witness protection safe house to meet Takahashi, while Rainbow and the SRT attempt to intercept both parties; however, when they arrive, they find Suk-won has been kidnapped and Takahashi has been killed.

Rainbow and the SRT track Suk-won, Sasamoto, and Ikeshita-gumi to Gadeokdo, where they have been surrounded by the police and the Republic of Korea Navy, with their narco-submarine also trapped in the vicinity. Rainbow kills Sasamoto and the hitmen, rescues Suk-won, and shuts down Ikeshita-gumi's smuggling operation.

Three months later, Rainbow is called back to South Korea to rescue government representatives at a ski resort in Gangwon. The assailants, the anarchist anti-globalist Government Free Activist Organization, launched the attack to prevent the formation of a free-trade zone between ASEAN countries, South Korea, and Japan. Rainbow plants surveillance devices in the resort and disables its security alarm, then assaults the resort shortly after, killing the terrorists and saving the representatives.

== Development ==
Kama Digital Entertainment bought the Rogue Spear game engine to develop Take-Down.

It was announced at a press conference on 5 February 2001 that Take-Down would be released in June 2001. Despite promises from Red Storm Entertainment that the game would be released internationally, the game was not released outside South Korea.

On 24 January 2001, the 1.03 patch was released, including additional missions, maps, and weapons. In the patch's new plot, set three months after the main campaign, Rainbow is sent to handle a hostage situation in Gangwon.
