= Tom Clancy's H.A.W.X =

2009 video game

- Developers: Ubisoft Bucharest; Ubisoft Kyiv (PC); Gameloft (BlackBerry, iOS, Palm Pre, Android, Symbian^3)
- Publisher: Ubisoft
- Designer: Thomas Simon
- Composer: Tom Salta
- Platforms: Xbox 360, PlayStation 3, Microsoft Windows, iOS, BlackBerry PlayBook, Palm Pre, Android, Symbian^3
- Release: March 3, 2009: Xbox 360; NA: March 3, 2009; EU: March 6, 2009; JP: April 23, 2009 PlayStation 3; NA: March 3, 2009; EU: March 6, 2009; JP: May 28, 2009 Microsoft Windows; NA: March 17, 2009; EU: March 19, 2009; JP: July 17, 2009 iOS; WW: December 9, 2009 BlackBerry PlayBook; WW: January 8, 2010 Palm Pre; WW: April 2, 2010 Android; WW: September 13, 2010 Symbian^3; WW: January 16, 2011
- Genre: Combat flight simulator
- Modes: Single-player, multiplayer

Tom Clancy's H.A.W.X is an arcade-style combat flight simulation video game developed by Ubisoft Bucharest and published by Ubisoft for Microsoft Windows, Xbox 360 and PlayStation 3, and by Gameloft for BlackBerry PlayBook, iOS, Palm Pre, Android and Symbian^3. It was released for Xbox 360 and PlayStation 3 in North America on March 3, 2009, for Windows on March 17, for iOS on December 9, for BlackBerry on January 8, 2010, for Palm Pre on April 2, for Android on September 13, and for Symbian on January 16, 2011. A Wii version was announced, but was ultimately canceled. In September 2010, a sequel titled Tom Clancy's H.A.W.X 2 was released for Xbox 360 and PlayStation 3. The Microsoft Windows version was released in November 2010. In November 2018, Tom Clancy's H.A.W.X was added to the Xbox One's Backwards Compatibility list although only through physical media as it is not available on the Xbox Marketplace.

The story of the game takes place during the time of Tom Clancy's Ghost Recon Advanced Warfighter 2. H.A.W.X is set in the near future where private military companies have essentially replaced government-run military in many countries.

== Gameplay ==
The ERS in H.A.W.X: The player's plane, shown from the third person view, is escaping an incoming missile. ERS has rendered an escape path (red triangles) which the player should follow.

The basic gameplay mechanics of H.A.W.X are similar to those of other console-based flight arcade, such as Top Gun, Ace Combat and After Burner. Players take on enemies with over fifty aircraft available to them. Each mission is set amidst real-world locations in environments created with commercial satellite data. A cockpit, first-person, and third-person view are selectable, with third-person view giving the player an external view of both their plane and the target.

All aircraft in the game are equipped with guns, a large supply of the Joint Strike Missile (JSM) heat-seekers and a handful of flares. Most enemy aircraft that appear in the single-player campaign are downed when they are hit by two JSMs. Heavier aircraft such as strategic bombers are downed with four JSMs. Guns inflict little damage but their supply of bullets is infinite. Each aircraft may also carry one or two additional weapons. For instance, the A-10 attack aircraft may carry cluster bombs that are effective against a column of tanks but cannot be fired against airborne targets. The player may not customize the weapons, but may choose between predefined configurations.

The game features an "Enhanced Reality System" (ERS). The ERS includes radars, incoming missile detection, an anti-crash system, damage control system, tactical map, information relay, aircraft interception trajectories and weapons trajectory control. The ERS also allows players to issue orders to their squadron and other units. When fully activated, the ERS provides a great deal of assistance to the player, but the system features can be turned off selectively to make the game more difficult and give the player more maneuverability.

The Ace Edge flight stick and throttle control, designed for the limited edition Ace Combat 6 package, is fully compatible with the game on both Microsoft Windows and Xbox 360.

=== Multiplayer ===
Players are able to complete campaign missions in co-op mode. There is also a deathmatch mode where players can challenge each other. Winning players are rewarded with experience points to unlock more weapons. The planes that are available in multiplayer mode are determined by the current level of the player.

== Synopsis ==
=== Background ===
The game is set above the skies of a near-future world, which is increasingly dependent on private military companies with elite mercenaries, who have a relaxed view of the law. As these non-governmental organizations gain power, global conflict erupts with one powerful PMC attacking the United States.

The game is set in the same universe as Tom Clancy's Ghost Recon Advanced Warfighter, and Captain Scott Mitchell, the Ghost leader, is featured in several of the missions. Plot elements are also carried over from other Tom Clancy games, such as the missile defense system found in Tom Clancy's EndWar. During an interview with G4, H.A.W.X's lead designer Thomas Simon revealed that the game takes place between Tom Clancy's Ghost Recon Advanced Warfighter 2 and Tom Clancy's EndWar.

=== Plot ===
The player assumes the role of Major David Crenshaw, a U.S. Air Force pilot and squadron leader of an elite unit called H.A.W.X ("High Altitude Warfare eXperimental squadron"). The game begins in 2014 with Crenshaw providing air support for the Ghost Recon team carrying out covert operations in Ciudad Juárez, Mexico. After the mission, the Air Force deactivates the H.A.W.X program and Crenshaw is recruited into Artemis Global Security, a private military corporation.

Over the next six years, Crenshaw and his squadron fly missions for Artemis and its clients, such as defending valuable facilities and attacking insurgent bases. In 2021, Artemis signs a lucrative defense contract with Brazil that makes it one of the most powerful PMCs in the world. As expected, Las Trinidad, an anti-U.S. alliance PMC, launches an invasion on Rio de Janeiro. But with the help of Crenshaw and his squadron, Artemis and the Brazilian forces are able to repel the invasion. In the wake of the conflict, the United States sends its forces to intervene, thereby subverting Artemis' role and causing its stock to drop. In response, Artemis takes up a profitable contract with Las Trinidad and launches a surprise attack on the United States Navy carrier strike group in the Strait of Magellan. Unwilling to turn against their own country, Crenshaw and his squadron destroy the Artemis fleet and their fighter escort.

After the battle, the U.S. sends Crenshaw and an Air Force bomber squadron on a retaliatory mission to bomb the Artemis Operations Center in the Caribbean Sea. However, Artemis knocks out the U.S. communications and intelligence satellites and launches a massive preemptive invasion of the United States, capturing numerous major U.S. cities and military bases. H.A.W.X and the U.S. forces defend Washington, D.C., and the President of the United States. Crenshaw and his squadron then assist the American counterattack against Artemis in Chicago and Naval Station Norfolk. As the U.S. gains the upper hand with the help of Japan and NATO, Artemis, which had acquired several tactical nuclear weapons, issues an ultimatum to the President: surrender in 24 hours or watch the U.S. be destroyed. H.A.W.X. squadron, a Ghost Recon team and NASA manage to restore the Space, Land, Air Missile Shield (see: Tom Clancy's EndWar) and helps the Army Ranger battalion to capture a decommissioned U.S. Army base in the Nevada Desert and recover the warheads. However, in a last-ditch effort, Artemis smuggles one warhead into Los Angeles and prepares to detonate it. With only one minute left before detonation, Crenshaw destroys the nuke and concludes the war.

The three days of conflict between the U.S. and Artemis has caused over 40,000 casualties. In response, the United Nations forces all PMCs to disarm and either take on small scale support and logistical roles or be terminated. Several weeks later, Artemis is completely wiped out. Crenshaw kills the Artemis' CEO by destroying his hideout in a black operation.

== Development ==
H.A.W.X was announced on July 15, 2008, at the annual E3 2008 developers conference. Prior to this, Ubisoft issued a press release about the game under its working title Tom Clancy's Air Combat. A demo of the game for the Xbox 360 was released on February 11, 2009; for the PlayStation 3 on February 27, 2009; and for Microsoft Windows on March 2, 2009.

Tom Clancy's H.A.W.X uses a new high-resolution image program and GeoEye's commercial Earth-imaging Ikonos satellite system. The H.A.W.X development team worked closely with GeoEye so that satellite images could be used in the game's nineteen-level environment; "High-resolution satellite imaging is moving from the black world of intelligence to the white world of commerce, and Tom Clancy's HAWX will bring that reality to gamers", said GeoEye VP, Mark Brender.

== Reception ==
Reception

Aggregate scores
Aggregator	Score			
Aggregator	iOS	PC	PS3	Xbox 360
GameRankings		72%	73.50%	74.59%
Metacritic		70/100	74/100	73/100

Review scores
Publication	Score			
Publication	iOS	PC	PS3	Xbox 360
Eurogamer				6/10
Game Informer			8.75/10	
GameRevolution			B	
GameSpot			7.5/10	7.5/10
IGN	7.9/10	6.7/10	6.8/10	6.7/10
PlayStation Official Magazine – UK			6/10	
Official U.S. PlayStation Magazine			3.5/5	
Official Xbox Magazine (UK)				8/10
PC Gamer (UK)		66/100		
TeamXbox				8.4/10
X-Play				4/5

H.A.W.X received mixed to positive reviews. The satellite mapping was largely praised due to its increased authenticity, although it was also criticized as pixelation becomes very obvious during low-level flying.

Game Informer's Matt Miller praised the game for its "big thrills". Other reviewers criticized the game as "stale". IGN's Nate Ahearn wrote "The co-op is fun, but the lacking multiplayer is a bummer," and X-Play's Jake Gaskill stated "Versus multiplayer is confusingly shallow". Zero Punctuation, known for its harsh review style, gave it a rare positive review, with reviewer Ben Croshaw criticising the story but complimenting the gameplay.

== Sequel ==
On May 5, 2010, Ubisoft announced that a sequel, Tom Clancy's H.A.W.X 2, was being developed for the Xbox 360, PlayStation 3, Wii and PC. The game was released on September 3, 2010, for Xbox 360, on September 10 for PlayStation 3, and on November 12 for Wii and PC.
