= Tom Clancy's Rainbow Six Extraction =

2022 video game

- Developer: Ubisoft Montreal
- Publisher: Ubisoft
- Director: Patrik Methé
- Producer: Antoine Vimal de Monteil
- Designer: Alicia Fortier
- Series: Tom Clancy's Rainbow Six
- Engine: AnvilNext 2.0
- Platforms: PlayStation 4; PlayStation 5; Google Stadia; Windows; Xbox One; Xbox Series X/S
- Release: January 20, 2022
- Genre: Tactical shooter
- Mode: Multiplayer

Tom Clancy's Rainbow Six Extraction is an online multiplayer tactical shooter video game developed by Ubisoft Montreal and published by Ubisoft. A spin-off of Rainbow Six Siege (2015), Extraction is a cooperative multiplayer game in which players must work together to combat and defeat a type of parasite-like aliens called the Archæans. The game was released for PlayStation 4, PlayStation 5, Google Stadia, Windows, Xbox One and Xbox Series X/S on January 20, 2022. It received mixed reviews from critics.

== Gameplay ==
Rainbow Six Extraction is a cooperative multiplayer game that can support up to three players. In Extraction, the operators must infiltrate an alien-infested location and complete objectives, such as collecting samples, extracting materials from computers, and gathering intel. Each play session, known as an "incursion", is made up of three interconnected sub-maps, and players will be assigned any one of the twelve objectives randomly in each sub-map. The location of the objectives and the placement of enemies are procedurally generated. Once the player secured their objective, they can choose to extract themselves, or explore the next sub-map. A new area can be more difficult than the previous, but players receive more rewards by completing them successfully. Extracting early ensures the safety of operators. If an operator is taken down by an enemy, they will become missing in action or Inactive, and players cannot play as them until they have rescued them in an extraction mission. Characters which are severely injured in the previous mission will also remain hurt and will only recover slowly.

Many operators from Siege return in Extraction, as they have formed the Rainbow Exogenous Analysis and Containment Team (REACT) in order to contain the alien threat. Before the commencement of any mission, players can choose their operator from a pool of 18. Each operator has their own unique weapons and gadgets. For instance, Pulse has a heartbeat sensor that allows him to spot enemies through walls, while Alibi can deploy a holographic decoy to distract enemies. Team composition is essential for success, as the players in the same session must select three different characters. Like Siege, players can send out recon drones to scout the area, reinforce doors and windows to seal entrances, and shoot through walls. Players must work together and coordinate with each other in order to succeed. The game has a ping system which allows players to reveal the locations of hostile threats and resources to other players.

The aliens featured in the game are called the "Archæans". In addition to the standard enemies, there are also special variants, such as the spikers that can shoot sharp projectiles from their body, and rooters that can slow the player down significantly. Areas are covered with a calcified lime called "sprawl". Players are significantly slowed down while they stand on Sprawl, while enemies will become much stronger. Sprawl can be repelled by shooting at it. Unlike most other cooperative multiplayer games, Extraction has a slower pace. Players' health does not regenerate, and health pick-ups, supplies and ammo are scarce. Stealth is encouraged. If the player is detected by an opponent after making too much noise, it will shriek and attract more enemies.

== Development ==
Rainbow Six Extraction was developed by Ubisoft Montreal as a spin-off of 2015's Tom Clancy's Rainbow Six Siege. According to Jason Schreier, Extraction originated from a project named Pioneer which was first teased in Watch Dogs 2 (2016). Pioneer was originally envisioned as a sci-fi exploration game, until it was repurposed in 2019 with Siege's engine AnvilNext 2.0. The game is based on a time-limited game mode in Siege named Outbreak in 2018, in which players must combat hostile aliens in New Mexico. Despite that, Ubisoft reiterated that the game is a mainline title in the series, as Extraction was intended as an experience for players who are not interested in playing player-versus-player multiplayer video game. By having Siege characters playable in Extraction, the team believed they can attract players from Siege to play the game, and enable Extraction to become a good entry point for new players.

One of the early challenges during the game's development is combining elements of a horde mode shooter into Rainbow Six. While most other games focus extensively on using firearms to gun down enemies, Extraction instead focuses on the objectives and surviving the encounters with the aliens, as the team believed that the characters in the game, which are members of a SWAT team, should not be "entrenched and shoot and mow down hundreds of enemies" and instead should surprise the enemies by ambushing them. Teammates would become missing in action, as the team believed that this feature can induce a sense of tension, since players always need to decide whether they would continue venturing further into the containment zone at the risk of losing an operator temporarily.

The game was revealed during E3 2019 as Tom Clancy's Rainbow Six Quarantine and was set to be released in 2020 for PlayStation 4, Windows, and Xbox One. The game was delayed in October 2019 alongside two other Ubisoft titles to fiscal year 2020-2021 in order to give the team more time. It was then delayed again to fiscal year 2021-2022 due to development challenges during the COVID-19 pandemic. Also during the pandemic, Ubisoft reportedly dropped the Quarantine name due to its association with the pandemic, using the internal codename Parasite until they announced the new title as Extraction in June 2021. In July, it was delayed once more to January 2022. An email invitation for a Technical Test went out to “selected” participants on November 2, 2021, with the test itself taking place from November 5–7. The game was released on January 20, 2022 for PlayStation 4, PlayStation 5, Stadia, Windows, Xbox One and Xbox Series X and Series S with cross-platform play supported. Ubisoft also lowered the launch price of Extraction, and introduced free co-op passes for players. Ubisoft also revealed on January 5, 2022 that Extraction would launch day one on Xbox Game Pass for Console, Cloud, and PC users.

According to an official Ubisoft Support employee, development on the game has been paused indefinitely since around Q4 2022.

== Reception ==
Reception

Aggregate score
Aggregator	Score
Metacritic	PC: 71/100; PS5: 73/100; XSX: 71/100

Review scores
Publication	Score
Electronic Gaming Monthly	3/5
Game Informer	7.25/10
GameSpot	7/10
GamesRadar+	3.5/5
IGN	7/10
PC Gamer (US)	73/100
PCGamesN	6/10
Push Square	6/10

Rainbow Six Extraction received "mixed or average" reviews from critics, according to review aggregator Metacritic. The game attracted three million players within its first week of release.

The Washington Post praised the title's extraction mechanic, saying that it "lends the game a layer of drama and, at times, humor. Back-seat sessions in which one player is tasked with rescuing his downed teammates... become nail-biter spectacles". PC Gamer liked the vulnerability of characters, writing that "This fragility builds tension as we step deeper into enemy territory trying not to alert an Archaean long enough for it to scream", but criticized the higher difficulties as being unbalanced. While disliking the repetitiveness of the game modes, IGN appreciated the visual design. GameSpot lauded the shooting mechanics, tactical depth generated by interconnected zones, and progression track, while criticizing the unremarkable story, operator disparity, and specific studies. Push Square called some of the art direction "spectacular", going on to similarly praise the health system, stealth, and setting while citing the unimpressive AI, enemy design, level progression, story, and lack of engaging gameplay as major drawbacks.

The game's lack of innovation was commonly criticised. PCGamesN felt that the game misused Siege's mechanics and operators, "All of those ingredients are present in Extraction, but they’ve been mixed in such a way that they fail to impart any flavour." He further compared Extraction to the limited-time game mode Outbreak in Siege. GamesRadar+ appreciated the alien races, multiplayer, and iteration upon Siege's ideas while panning it for lacking identity and being repetitive. Game Informer praised the weapon handling, enemy variety, and polish, but called the title "incredibly safe and markedly less gripping than its predecessor." EGM concluded that Siege's mechanics were successfully adapted for cooperative play but called the game "more boring than it has any right to be...more of an obligation than an escape."
