= Tom Clancy's Rainbow Six: Rogue Spear =

1999 video game

- Developers: Red Storm Entertainment (Note: Ported to Classic Mac OS by Varcon Systems); Pipe Dream Interactive (DC); Saffire (PS); Ubi Soft Milan (GBA)
- Publishers: NA: Red Storm Entertainment (Note: Mac OS port published by MacSoft); EU: Take-Two Interactive; Ubi Soft (GBA)
- Producer: Carl Schnurr
- Designer: Carl Schnurr
- Programmer: Todd Lewis
- Artists: Steve Cotton; Jonathan Peedin
- Writers: Brian Upton; Kevin Perry; Tom Clancy
- Composer: Bill Brown
- Series: Tom Clancy's Rainbow Six
- Platforms: Windows, Dreamcast, Mac OS, PlayStation, Game Boy Advance
- Release: September 22, 1999: Windows; NA: September 22, 1999; EU: October 8, 1999; AU: October 21, 1999 Dreamcast; NA: November 20, 2000; EU: May 4, 2001 Mac OS; NA: January 9, 2001 PlayStation; EU: January 19, 2001; NA: March 27, 2001 Game Boy Advance; NA: March 14, 2002; EU: March 22, 2002
- Genre: Tactical shooter
- Modes: Single-player, multiplayer

Tom Clancy's Rainbow Six: Rogue Spear is a 1999 tactical first-person shooter video game developed and published by Red Storm Entertainment for Microsoft Windows, with later ports for the Dreamcast, Mac OS, PlayStation, and Game Boy Advance. The sequel to 1998's Tom Clancy's Rainbow Six, it is the second installment in the Rainbow Six series and the last to be published by Red Storm before its acquisition by Ubi Soft in 2000. The game's plot follows the secret international counterterrorist organization Rainbow as they investigate nuclear terrorism in Eastern Europe.

Rogue Spear was released on September 22, 1999 to generally positive reviews on PC, but mixed reviews for all other platforms. Critics praised its significant improvements on the original Rainbow Six's formula but criticized the AI behavior which, while improved, acted inconsistently, and the cluttered planning stage that was more burdensome with Rogue Spear's larger and more complex levels. The game sold over 200,000 copies in its first year of release, with almost 500,000 copies sold by 2006. It was nominated for numerous accolades and has been considered one of the best action games of 1999.

A PlayStation 2 port was announced, but was ultimately canceled. Three expansion packs for the game were released between 2000 and 2001, adding new missions, weapons, characters, and assorted materials. Two spin-off games—Tom Clancy's Rainbow Six: Take-Down – Missions in Korea, using Rogue Spear's engine and Tom Clancy's Rainbow Six: Lone Wolf, a PlayStation exclusive—were released in 2001 and 2002 respectively. A sequel, Tom Clancy's Rainbow Six 3: Raven Shield, was released in 2003. In 2006, the United States Department of Defense licensed Rogue Spear's engine for use in training simulation programs.

== Gameplay ==
Rainbow Six: Rogue Spear is a tactical shooter, in which characters are affected by realistic factors and can be killed with a single bullet, thus promoting planning and tactics over force and firepower. Rogue Spear is very similar to its predecessor, Rainbow Six, and uses the same engine and gameplay, albeit greatly modified to feature improved graphics and animations, improved artificial intelligence, and new mechanics such as camouflage selection and the return of the hands-off "watch" mode from Rainbow Six: Eagle Watch. The campaign features a total of 18 missions from locations around the world, while the multiplayer portion features 20 different maps.

Rogue Spear's basic gameplay remains mostly unchanged from Rainbow Six, with the exception of the addition of a 'lean' mechanic, allowing players to peek around corners. The game follows a campaign of several missions, with objectives ranging from rescuing hostages and defusing bombs to gathering intelligence and planting surveillance devices; there are various approaches the player can take to complete said objectives, but Rogue Spear takes an approach that promotes stealth, as enemies can now react to the player's presence if they are heard or seen, such as investigating the area, fleeing, or attacking hostages. Before each mission is a briefing that details the situation and advances the plot, and a planning stage where the player selects the Rainbow operatives they want for the operation (categorized into Assault, Demolitions, Electronics, Recon, and Sniper based on their skillsets), sets waypoints and orders for their color-coded teams on a map of the area of operations, and equips their operatives with appropriate weapons, equipment, and uniforms for the mission. During the mission, the player can control the leader of any team at will, while teams not controlled by the player follow the orders assigned to them in planning. Injured operatives cannot be healed during a mission, while deceased operatives are permanently gone for the rest of the campaign playthrough, forcing players to plan carefully to avoid casualties.

Rogue Spear features two free-play modes outside the campaign: Lone Wolf, where the player must complete an entire level using only a single operative; and Terrorist Hunt, where the player must defeat up to 30 terrorists in a level, with no other objectives aside from clearing the entire level of enemies.

Rogue Spear's online multiplayer consists of two modes: cooperative and adversarial. Cooperative mode has players team up to complete missions against AI-controlled enemies in formats similar to the singleplayer missions, while adversarial mode pits players against one another in deathmatch and team deathmatch modes. Rogue Spear does not support dedicated servers, and games are limited to sixteen players per server.

== Plot ==
In 2001, Rainbow, led by John Clark, handles a spike in terrorist attacks conducted by various seemingly unaffiliated terrorist groups. Meanwhile, the former Eastern Bloc has fallen into disarray since the dissolution of the Soviet Union a decade prior, with conflict, crime, and corruption increasing as money and necessities become scarce.

Investigating a thwarted nerve agent attack in Oman, Rainbow, assisted by an anonymous informant, sources the agent to anti-Western oil baron Samed Vezirzade. Surveillance of Vezirzade leads Rainbow to an illegal deal between a Russian military unit and Russian mobsters connected to arms dealer Maxim Kutkin and kingpin Lukyan Barsukov. Rainbow interrupts the deal and recovers weapons-grade plutonium, leading them to believe Kutkin is assembling nuclear weapons. Rainbow plants surveillance devices in Vezirzade's mansion and Kutkin's private spa, and discovers Vezirzade has been supporting terrorist groups for his own gain; they also learn he is aware Rainbow is after him.

Rainbow locates and raids Kutkin's nuclear weapons facility in Siberia, destroying the facility and recovering two nuclear weapons. Meanwhile, the informant leaves to "set things right", and Kutkin's mafia is promptly embroiled in a gang war; Rainbow analyst Susan Holt learns the informant was Barsukov himself, who was suspicious of Kutkin (his son-in-law) and needed Rainbow's investigations to confirm. Suddenly, Holt and Barsukov are kidnapped by Kutkin; worse, Clark learns two additional nuclear weapons were not recovered from the Siberian facility. After rescuing Holt and Barsukov, Rainbow learns Kutkin is personally moving the nuclear weapons to the West, and they intercept the shipment, securing the nuclear weapons and seemingly killing Kutkin.

After Kutkin's defeat, Rainbow raids Vezirzade's personal fortress in Azerbaijan, killing him when he fights back. However, Kutkin is revealed to still be alive, having used a double to fake his death. Aware his downfall is imminent, Kutkin seizes a nuclear power plant in Ukraine, intent on causing a Chernobyl-esque nuclear meltdown in a last-ditch suicide attack. Rainbow storms the plant, killing Kutkin and preventing the meltdown.

With the threat finally resolved, Clark debriefs Rainbow and notes that Kutkin's spa has been sold to Barsukov, who claims he has retired from crime and will settle down to operate the spa legally; however, Rainbow continues to monitor Barsukov with a hidden camera, and it is implied he has not retired after all. While discussing his plans with an aide, Barsukov suddenly turns his attention to the hidden camera and, after rebuking Clark for invading his privacy, shoots it.

== Add-ons ==
=== Urban Operations ===
Rogue Spear Mission Pack: Urban Operations, released on April 4, 2000, was the first expansion for Rogue Spear. It was developed and published by Red Storm Entertainment. It added eight new maps and five classic Rainbow Six maps from the original game, three new weapons, and a built-in mod system. Urban Operations was later re-released by Kama Digital Entertainment in South Korea, including two exclusive missions and two new weapons.

=== Covert Ops Essentials ===
Rainbow Six: Covert Ops Essentials is a stand-alone expansion pack of Rogue Spear, released on September 28, 2000. Developed as an educational game and a training simulator, Covert Ops Essentials was developed by Magic Lantern Playware and published by Red Storm Entertainment. It includes nine new maps in total, and a three mission long campaign. Six of the maps were made by Zombie Studios, while the three mission campaign was made by Red Storm. Covert Ops Essentials includes educational materials such as actual military field manuals, view video interviews from counterterrorism experts, take multiple-choice tests to progress in rank, and see live-fire demonstrations of the weapons featured in the game. For the live-fire videos, Sergeant Anthony Levatino, a SWAT team leader of the Santa Ana Police Department, was contracted to provide expertise for the educational material and for the video demonstrations.

=== Black Thorn ===
Rogue Spear: Black Thorn was developed by Red Storm Entertainment and published by Ubi Soft as a stand-alone add-on on December 15, 2001, featuring nine new single-player maps and fifteen new multiplayer maps, along with eleven new weapons and a new multiplayer game mode called Lone Wolf. The single-player plot follows Rainbow's attempts to stop a mentally disturbed ex-SAS operative organizing violent reenactments of historical terrorist incidents such as Operation Entebbe and the Japanese embassy hostage crisis.

== Development ==
Rogue Spear uses the same game engine as the original Rainbow Six, albeit with new and improved additions and refreshed graphics and visuals.

== Reception ==
Reception

Aggregate scores
Aggregator	Score
GameRankings	(PC) 85.97% (GBA) 75.77% (DC) 72.62% (PS) 60.07%
Metacritic	(GBA) 76/100 (DC) 75/100

Review scores
Publication	Score
AllGame	4/5 (PS) 2.5/5
Computer and Video Games	(PC) 4/5
Eurogamer	8/10
Game Informer	(GBA) 7.75/10 (DC) 7/10
GamePro	(PC) 4.5/5 (GBA) 3.5/5
GameRevolution	(PC) A− (DC) C−
GameSpot	(PC) 8/10 (DC) 7.6/10 (GBA) 7/10 (PS) 6.4/10
GameSpy	(PC) 96% (GBA) 79% (DC) 7.5/10
GameZone	(DC) 9.5/10 (PC) 7.4/10
IGN	(PC) 9.2/10 (GBA) 8.4/10 (DC) 7.8/10 (PS) 4.5/10
Next Generation	(PC) 4/5 (DC) 4/5
Nintendo Power	4.3/5
Official U.S. PlayStation Magazine	2.5/5
PC Gamer (US)	90%

Tom Clancy's Rainbow Six: Rogue Spear was met with positive to mixed reception upon release. Review aggregator Metacritic displays a score of 85.97% for the PC version, 75.77% for the Game Boy Advance, 72.62% for the Dreamcast, and 60.07% for the PlayStation. Video game review aggregator GameRankings displays 76/100 for the Game Boy Advance and 75/100 for the Dreamcast.

Many reviewers noted Rogue Spear's similarity to Rainbow Six, and commended its various improvements on the original. Tal Blevins of IGN deemed Rogue Spear "certainly in the running for Best Action Game of '99", praising its improvements over the original Rainbow Six in graphics, game mechanics, level design, and AI improvements. Michael E. Ryan of GameSpot similarly praised the improvements in graphics, game mechanics, and weapon diversity, but stated the largely unchanged and "cluttered" planning stage did not work with Rogue Spear's larger, more detailed levels, and failed to provide an accurate feel for the actual level depicted. John Lee reviewed the PC version of the game for Next Generation, rating it four stars out of five, describing it as "More of the same, but then it's hard to ask for anything more." Greg Orlando reviewed the Dreamcast version of the game for Next Generation and also rated it four stars out of five, saying "A title that works on many different levels, Rogue Spear is a must-have for the Dreamcast-owning shooter fan."

Reviewers found notable issues with the game's AI. Blevins noted that while Rogue Spear's AI was considerably improved compared to the original Rainbow Six's AI, they acted inconsistently and often failed to react to obvious threats. Ryan called the game's teammate AI "flaky" and noted teammates were far more likely to die in combat or even in accidents such as falling off ladders, which he critically contrasted with the enemy AI, which he described as very reactive and "rarely, if ever, miss[ing] their targets", making the game "overwhelmingly difficult for all the wrong reasons". Gestalt of Eurogamer considered AI flaws to have greatly let down the game, recalling an incident where he watched almost an entire team of operatives get killed by a single terrorist without firing back once, with only one team member surviving because "he'd managed to get lost earlier on in the mission".

=== Black Thorn ===
Black Thorn

Aggregate scores
Aggregator	Score
GameRankings	71.92%
Metacritic	67/100

Review scores
Publication	Score
Eurogamer	7/10
GameSpot	6.9/10
GameSpy	68%
IGN	7/10
PC Gamer (US)	73%

Expansion packs of the PC version received lower scores than the original release. The most recent was Black Thorn, which currently has a score of 71.92% on GameRankings, and 67 out of 100 on Metacritic.

=== Accolades ===
The editors of PC Gamer US named Rogue Spear the best action game of 1999, and wrote, "Congratulations, Red Storm... in a loud market, you made the quiet revolution." The Academy of Interactive Arts & Sciences nominated Rogue Spear for "PC Action Game of the Year" at its 3rd Annual Interactive Achievement Awards, but ultimately lost to Half-Life: Opposing Force.

=== Sales ===
In the United States, Rogue Spear's sales reached 240,503 copies by April 2000. In the same country, the game's Platinum re-release sold another 240,000 copies and earned $7.7 million by August 2006, after its launch in October 2001. It was the U.S.'s 85th best-selling computer game between January 2000 and August 2006.
