= Tom Clancy's Ghost Recon: Jungle Storm =

- Developer: Red Storm Entertainment
- Publisher: Ubisoft (Note: N-Gage and mobile versions developed and published by Gameloft)
- Writer: Richard Dansky
- Composer: Bill Brown
- Series: Tom Clancy's Ghost Recon
- Platforms: PlayStation 2, N-Gage, Mobile
- Release: PlayStation 2: FRA: March 11, 2004; UK: March 12, 2004; NA: March 16, 2004; N-Gage: NA: August 10, 2004; Mobile: NA: April 26, 2005
- Genre: Tactical shooter
- Modes: Single-player, multiplayer

Tom Clancy's Ghost Recon: Jungle Storm is a 2004 expansion pack for Tom Clancy's Ghost Recon developed by Red Storm Entertainment and published by Ubisoft for the PlayStation 2, Nokia N-Gage, and mobile phones. It contains the content of Tom Clancy's Ghost Recon: Island Thunder along with additional multiplayer maps and an eight-mission campaign. Set shortly after the events of Island Thunder, Jungle Storm follows the "Ghosts", an elite special forces unit of the United States Army, as they combat guerilla armies in Latin America that threaten to destabilize the region.

== Plot ==
In 2010, the People's Democratic Front, an anti-American Marxist–Leninist political party-turned-terrorist group, attempts to overthrow the democratizing government of Cuba after losing an election by requesting support from the Revolutionary Armed Forces of Colombia (FARC), but they fail and are defeated by the Ghosts. When FARC attacks an American embassy in Colombia, the Ghosts turn their attention to helping the Colombian government and United Nations peacekeepers combat FARC and the Movimiento de las Fuerzas Libres Colombianas (MFLC), a similar militia active in southern Colombia, Ecuador, and Peru.

The Ghosts deploy to Colombia and hunt down several key MFLC's figures, defend civilian centers spread throughout the region, rescue hostages, and cut off the MFLC's drug smuggling revenue stream. However, operations against the MFLC and FARC reveal the existence of rebel sleeper cells in Cuba which, if activated, could topple Cuba's new democratic government and embroil Latin America in a needless conflict. Tasked with preventing their activation, the Ghosts and a UN peacekeeping force assault an MFLC stronghold at a radio tower before the sleeper cell activation can be transmitted, preventing the escalation of the conflict and allowing the Ghosts to defeat the MFLC while making FARC lose the initiative in their rebellion.

== Reception ==
Reception

Aggregate scores
Aggregator	Score
GameRankings	70.36%
Metacritic	70/100

Review scores
Publication	Score
Computer and Video Games	78%
Electronic Gaming Monthly	5.33/10
Game Informer	7.5/10
GamePro	4/5
GameSpot	6.3/10
GameSpy	3/5
GameZone	7/10
IGN	6.5/10
Official U.S. PlayStation Magazine	4/5
Maxim	8/10

Combined sales of Jungle Storm and Tom Clancy's Ghost Recon: Island Thunder reached 1.1 million copies by the end of March 2004.

Tom Clancy's Ghost Recon: Jungle Storm received mixed reviews. It has an aggregate score of 70.36% on GameRankings and 70/100 on Metacritic. It received a runner-up placement in GameSpot's 2004 "Best N-Gage Game" award category, losing to Colin McRae Rally 2005.

The game went offline in 2011.
