= Tom Clancy's H.A.W.X 2 =

2010 video game

H.A.W.X. 2
- Developer: Ubisoft Bucharest
- Publisher: Ubisoft
- Designers: Edward J Douglas, Bogdan Bridinel
- Composer: Tom Salta
- Platforms: Microsoft Windows; PlayStation 3; Xbox 360; Wii; Cloud (OnLive)
- Release: Xbox 360: AU/EU: September 2, 2010; UK: September 3, 2010; NA: September 7, 2010; PlayStation 3: NA: September 7, 2010; AU/EU: September 9, 2010; UK: September 10, 2010; Wii: NA: November 9, 2010; AU: November 11, 2010; EU: November 12, 2010; Windows: WW: November 11, 2010
- Genre: Combat flight simulator
- Modes: Single-player, multiplayer

Tom Clancy's H.A.W.X. 2 is an arcade-style combat flight simulation video game developed by Ubisoft Bucharest and published by Ubisoft. It is the sequel to 2009 game, Tom Clancy's H.A.W.X, and was released for Xbox 360 and PlayStation 3 in September 2010, and for Wii and Microsoft Windows in November 2010.

== Gameplay ==
The game features a story campaign which can be played solo or with cooperation of three other players. The player is often in control of Major Alex Hunter, a pilot from High Altitude Warfare – Experimental (HAWX) squadron but gets to play one or two missions as other pilots, including Captain Dimitri Ivanovich Sokov of Russian Air Force, Lieutenant Colin Munro of the British Royal Navy and Colonel David Crenshaw of HAWX squadron. In most missions, the player pilots a combat aircraft, but occasionally, the player gets to remotely control an unmanned aerial vehicle (UAV). Also in one mission, the player assumes the role of a guns operator in an AC-130 Spooky.

The gameplay experience has significantly changed from that of the previous game. Unlike the previous game, the player is no longer given an option of a plane or weapon load-out for the story missions. In addition, the player assumes the role of a wingman while flying as part of a flight, as opposed to a flight leader; therefore, it is no longer possible to issue orders to other wingmen.

The game adds takeoff, landing and occasional aerial refueling. Landing allows the player to rearm.

The game has changed focus from fire-and-forget missiles towards operator-guided or unguided ordnance. New weapons include stand-off missiles, precision missiles and precision bombs, all of which are forms of operator-guided weapons with slight differences. Joint Strike Missiles, anti-air and ground missiles which were available in all planes and configurations of the previous game, are no longer available in the story campaign and have their damage and range reduced in other modes. Multi-target anti-ground missiles are no longer available. To further discourage the player from using guided missiles, some enemy planes constantly dispense an endless supply of flares, making guns the only option.

H.A.W.X 2 puts more emphasis on co-op games. According to G4TV, "it feels like the game is primarily intended to be a co-op game." The game adds a new class of electronic warfare planes designed specifically for co-op games. These planes carry ECM devices but do not have guns. In a co-op game, a player flying these planes must keep a distance from the action; his or her participation amounts to a rather dull job of keeping friendly planes within the support range of his or her ECM device. The game also features a multiplayer deathmatch in which up to eight players can play against each other.

The PC version of the game supports mouse and keyboard for controlling planes; however, only keyboard may be used to control AC-130 guns or operator-guided ordnance.

=== Wii version ===
Wii version of H.A.W.X 2 is an entirely different video game, except in terms of branding. It requires a Wii nunchuk. The player mainly takes control of crewed combat jets and helicopters. There are unique missions in which the player is in control of a UAV, a Space Shuttle, a space-based beam cannon, a free-falling man and a pet peregrine falcon.

Missions in the game (with the exception of mentioned unique missions) are classified into three categories.

- The first allows the player to fly a combat jet and use missiles and guns to engage enemy air (and occasionally ground) targets. The player's point of view is outside the plane.
- The second puts the player in control of a plane that can only fly close to the ground. Armed with guns and unguided rockets, the player has to engage ground targets. The point of view is behind the plane. These missions are very fast-paced and the target acquisition window is small. Overall, they resemble shoot 'em up games with a different camera angle.
- The third puts the player into the cockpit of an aircraft, as opposed to the previous two. The plane flies close to the ground and fires guns and guided rockets that hit exactly where the player highlights on the ground. The pace of these missions is slower, the aircraft has more room to maneuver in the 3D space, and the player has a far broader choice of targets.

Each mission can be played with the aircraft on autopilot or manual control. Changing the control type requires restarting the mission. Some missions are best played on autopilot whereas others need manual control.

Flares and aerial defense countermeasures are not available in this game. The player has to shoot down incoming missiles using guns.

== Plot ==
The game takes place after an unknown period of time following the events of the first game but none of the characters of the first game, except David Crenshaw, are mentioned.

The game begins with Crenshaw (now a Colonel) piloting a routine patrol mission in the Middle East. After stopping an insurgent attack, a volley of cruise missiles is fired at the Prince Faisal Air Force Base where Crenshaw is about to land. One of the missiles disables Crenshaw's aircraft, resulting in Crenshaw being captured by the enemy. A Ghost Recon squad and an AC-130 gunship from H.A.W.X rescue Crenshaw. After his rescue, Crenshaw stays on board an aircraft carrier due to an injured arm and commands a remote surveillance operation with agent Drachev of the Russian Voron agency. (This agency is briefly introduced in Splinter Cell: Conviction.) Following the recon mission, H.A.W.X and the U.S. military conduct a large scale military operation to eliminate the insurgents and secure the region. The operation spans three days of fighting during which H.A.W.X flies several missions.

Meanwhile, Russia is at a civil war with its separatists. Despite the best efforts of its pilots – Colonel Denisov and Captain Sokov – Russian military bases fall to the separatists. In the aftermath of the fall, the Russian Air Force is sent to support Spetsnaz in recovering stolen nuclear warheads from the separatists in Romaniskhov. They recover only two out of the three warheads and their transport aircraft is shot down during extraction. Denisov and Sokov provide air support to the best of their abilities, but their commanding officer General Morgunov orders them to blow up the Nevskaya Dam, allegedly to flood the region and prevent the warheads from falling into enemy hands. In the aftermath, a nuclear warhead is detonated in the Romashkino oil field, crippling Russia's energy supplies. Consequently, Russian Ultranationalists seize control of Russia and start a war with Europe to obtain the much-needed resources by force.

While Sokov is piloting a UAV to kill the separatist leaders, Drachev contacts him and has him listen on a phone call between one of the separatists members and General Morgunov, revealing that the events in Russia had been a ruse for the Russian ultranationalists to sabotage Russia's energy industry and seize control of the Russian government. After being privy of the truth, Sokov escapes on a Su-30 and defects to Crenshaw with the incriminating evidence. H.A.W.X then undertakes an operation to secure one of the remaining warheads in Cape Town. Meanwhile, the Royal Navy repels an assault by the Russian Navy and pushes deep into Russian waters.

When the combined forces of the United States and Europe take the war to the Russian lands, H.A.W.X and Sokov fly a mission on Moscow. The Kremlin is captured by a Ghost Recon squad but Morgunov, who seems to have gone mad, flees to a Russian ICBM launch facility. He intends to launch nuclear missiles at every major city of the world, allegedly to kill the so-called mysterious people who control everyone and everything including him and Russia. H.A.W.X is sent in support of the ground forces to capture or destroy the facility. Denisov and his pilots fight H.A.W.X and are killed. In a last-ditch effort, Morgunov activates Russian orbital laser platforms and wipes out all H.A.W.X planes except Hunter's, who destroys the underground command bunker, killing Morgunov in it. Crenshaw swears to nominate Hunter for every medal in the United States military.

=== Wii version ===
The game tells the story of Arrow, a mercenary pilot initially in the employment of DDI, a ruthless private military corporation. Arrow does not approve of the DDI's lack of morality and eventually leaves the PMC to join its sworn enemy, H.A.W.X. The main adversaries in this game are DDI – whose CEO Rainmaker has world domination plans – and a mysterious mercenary ace codenamed Major Zeal.

== Development ==
Development on Tom Clancy’s H.A.W.X. 2 formally entered the public eye in early May 2010, when Ubisoft announced the sequel during a press campaign ahead of its planned autumn release window. The announcement confirmed that the title was in active development at Ubisoft’s Bucharest studio and outlined the target platforms and projected timeframe for launch later that year; this followed the commercial success of the original Tom Clancy’s H.A.W.X., which had sold over one million copies and established the franchise’s viability for a follow-up.

== Reception ==
Reception

Aggregate score
Aggregator	Score
Metacritic	68/100

Review scores
Publication	Score
GameSpot	7/10
IGN	4/10

Tom Clancy's H.A.W.X. 2 received "mixed or average" reviews from critics, according to review aggregator website Metacritic.

GameSpot praised the game as tense and enjoyable, but criticized due to inconsistent enemy artificial intelligence and collision detection issues. They also acknowledged that non-fighter mission types (such as UAV missions) provide variety, but often feel out of place or poorly integrated.

PC Gamer's Tim Stone described the game as being hampered by serious technical and design issues. He reports an incident where after crashing four aircraft in one play session, the game simply refused to allow him to start the next campaign sortie, there was no message or cutscene explaining that the player had been “grounded,” it just would not proceed. He likens occurrence to a game-breaking bug, suggesting that Ubisoft may have inadvertently shipped a title with a flaw of “the size of a B-52 bomber.”

Dan Whitehead from Eurogamer said that "H.A.W.X. 2 seems uncomfortably aware of its limitations and so goes out of its way to break up the aerial dogfighting." Suggesting that the game deliberately intervenes in its core combat to mitigate its weaknesses.
