= Tom Clancy's EndWar =

2008 video game

- Developers: Ubisoft Shanghai; Funatics (PSP/DS)
- Publisher: Ubisoft
- Producer: Audrey Leprince
- Designer: Michael de Plater
- Programmer: Wei Xiang
- Artist: Junchen Liao
- Composers: Alistair Hirst; Matt Ragan
- Engine: Unreal Engine 3 (consoles and PC)
- Platforms: Microsoft Windows, PlayStation Portable, PlayStation 3, Nintendo DS, Xbox 360
- Release: Nintendo DS, PlayStation 3, PlayStation Portable, Xbox 360: USA: November 4, 2008; EU: November 6, 2008; UK: November 7, 2008; Microsoft Windows: NA: February 24, 2009; EU: February 26, 2009; AU: February 26, 2009
- Genres: Real-time tactics (turn-based for handhelds)
- Modes: Single-player, multiplayer

Tom Clancy's EndWar is a strategy video game released by Ubisoft for PlayStation 3, Xbox 360, PlayStation Portable and Nintendo DS in November 2008. A Windows version was released in February 2009. The gameplay differs across platforms; the console and PC version is a real-time tactics game designed by Ubisoft Shanghai, while the handheld versions feature turn-based tactics.

The game received mixed to positive reviews. A sequel was in the works, but due to EndWar's commercial failure, it was cancelled in February 2010.

== Synopsis ==
=== Setting ===
A nuclear terrorist attack occurs in Saudi Arabia in 2016, killing six million people and crippling the supply of oil from the Middle East, plunging the world into an unprecedented energy crisis. The following year, the United States and the European Union sign the historic SLAMS (Space-Land-Air Missile Shield) Treaty, agreeing to co-develop technologies for a comprehensive, interlocking anti-ballistic missile system. The US and EU test-launch nuclear salvos against each other, which the SLAMS weapons completely destroy. Emboldened by the success of the tests, the US and the EU pronounce "the end of strategic nuclear warfare," and the world celebrates a new age of peace.

With the price of crude oil at US$800 a barrel, the EU member states are forced to consolidate political, economic, and military power to form a united European superstate, the European Federation (EF), which has a greater population and Gross National Product (GNP) than the US. The United Kingdom and Ireland opt not to join the new state, however, and instead form their own union known as the "New Commonwealth," which remains neutral but allows European forces to man the missile defense uplink sites on its territory.

As EF membership is restricted to only the richest entities in Europe, nations too weak to join the EF, notably those in the Balkans and Eastern Europe, collapse completely and are subsequently taken over by Russia, who refer to it as "their land." The US and the EF regard each other's power as a threat to their own, and the fractured former allies embark on a costly space arms race with each other.

Russia, being the world's number one supplier of natural gas and crude oil, experiences a massive economic boom as a result of the worldwide energy crisis. Its newfound wealth is spent on modernizing its military, creating its own missile defense system, and utilizing its power to influence world events.

The militarization of space reaches its peak in 2020, when the US reveals plans to launch the Freedom Star space station in an effort to regain its position as the premier world superpower. While partly designed for civilian research purposes, the station will also house three companies of US Marines, who can deploy anywhere on Earth within ninety minutes.

International reaction is very hostile, particularly from both Russia and the EF, who see the space station as a way in which the United States could neutralize their portion of anti-ballistic defenses and upset the balance of power. The EF withdraws from the already divided NATO in protest, causing the organization to collapse. Former NATO bases and facilities in Europe, such as Ramstein Air Base, are subsequently taken over by the EF.

=== Prelude to War ===
The prelude to war takes place before World War III and explains how the conflict began.

On March 23, 2020, EF uplink sites in the "lawless zone", where Croatia used to be, are attacked by an as-yet unidentified group of terrorists, who are using T-80 tanks, from a beached cargo ship. They are repulsed by EF Enforcers Corps (EFEC) forces. During the battle, the EF attempts to gain access to the cargo ship that the terrorists use, but the ship is destroyed before they can gain access. Details of the attack are kept secret.

On April 4, 2020, when the final module of the Freedom Star is set to launch from Kennedy Space Center amid international outcry, the same group of terrorists attack the module and attempt to destroy it, using the same methods as the Croatian attack. Once again they are repulsed, this time by the United States Joint Strike Force (JSF) as reports of yet another terrorist attack come in, this time of an assault on the Rozenburg petrol plant in the Netherlands. After being defeated by EFEC forces, the terrorists identify themselves as the "Forgotten Army," composed of people from a collection of failed states in the Balkans, Africa, and South America.

Following a final terrorist attack, this time on a Russian power plant near Minsk (an attack which the Russians had been aware of beforehand, but played along with for aesthetic purposes), the US finds "conclusive evidence" that the EF's defense minister, François Pulain, funded the Forgotten Army with modern military equipment. Suspecting there to be a conspiracy within the European government to prevent the completion of the Freedom Star, the Americans send a black ops team to abduct Pulain while he inspects the uplink network in Copenhagen, the site of the EF's main naval base.

They manage to capture him, but an anonymous call by Russia informs the police of Denmark, allowing EFEC forces to prevent extraction and trap the team in one of the uplinks. On April 7, 2020, the US crashes Copenhagen's uplinks and sends in JSF units to rescue the trapped team. The US successfully repels the EFEC's first attack, but European forces are able to counterattack and reboot Copenhagen's uplinks in their favor. The JSF forces are forced to surrender and are allowed safe passage back to the US in exchange for releasing Pulain.

The events in Copenhagen spark a major international incident, but the US and EF stop just short of declaring war. As last-minute peace talks are arranged to be held on neutral ground in London, it is revealed (to the player only) that Russia funded the Forgotten Army's attacks and planted the evidence against Pulain, citing the need to keep the EF and the US from uniting in order to take Russia's oil. To ensure that war is sparked between the two powers, elements of Russia's Spetsnaz Guard Brigade (SGB) embark on a covert operation, disguised as Forgotten Army soldiers, to upload a virus into the European SLAMS network at Rovaniemi Airport in Finland.

The virus causes an EF orbital laser satellite to shoot down the new Freedom Lifter module during liftoff, thinking it to be an ICBM. The entire crew is killed, and news reports blame problems from "malfunction" to "terrorist hijacking" to (finally) "EF satellite". This final act starts a war between the two powers. Russia initially joins the US under the guise of "aiding it in its crusade against Europe" and invades EF-controlled Poland, but the Americans see this as an attempt to reform the Eastern Bloc and then attack Russia. World War III has begun.

=== World War III ===
World War III is an open-ended part of the story where the player chooses their faction and character and tries to take all three capitals or 28 battlefields.

The campaign plays much like Prelude to War with a few additional options. During World War III, between battles, the player has the option to choose between several battle locations. The battles that the player did not choose will be fought by the machine. Also, battles lost or quit by players cannot be replayed and the territory is lost, whereas in Prelude to War, players could retry each battle until successful. Players may upgrade their chosen battalion, with improved attack, defense, mobility, and ability characteristics.

At the conclusion of each campaign battle a summary screen is shown. This screen includes information including number of battalion units promoted, amount of credits (money) received, command rating, medals, mission duration, and a quote by a famous military leader. The player can gain a more in depth understanding of the battle summary by viewing the details screens, which provide a breakdown of statistics, ranking, etc.

During the course of the war, several background situations arise, such as adverse weather, conditions like typhoons causing people to become homeless and rescue teams being dispatched. There are also reports of protest against the war from around the world as well as by individual figures such as the Pope. These parts of the story are told via television reports. They also report the sinking of enemy shipping by airstrikes and weapons of mass destruction. As the war progresses, the leader of an opposing nation survives an assassination attempt, around Turn 15.

When the war has ended, the winning faction takes control of the world and a special scene is shown, which shows the winning faction's flag and troops parading with the voice of the faction's general talking about their victory and what will happen in the future. Depending on whether it is the United States, Europe or Russia that is the winning side, the cutscene is different due to different speeches by generals and different reasons for starting the war.

=== Locations ===
In an IGN interview, De Plater said the setting of EndWar (as a possible series, but now cancelled due to poor sales) is a global battle, but the first installment is focused on the North Atlantic theater of battle: Europe, Russia, and North America. Players will hear reports of events in other parts of the world, such as reactions to the war by the Pope and various other countries, as well as actions in the war that the player takes no part in.

== Gameplay ==
Imp Rebs has confirmed 4x4 will be offered in the full version. De Plater confirmed the game to be a Real-time tactics strategy war game. Units will gain experience as they are used in battle. The emphasis will be more on smaller scale battles rather than the overarching campaign.

Ubisoft also claims that the game is "completely controllable through voice commands." This is demonstrated on a handful of gameplay videos by de Plater himself. The voice commands can be input through any headset that works with the console/computer the player is using.

=== Factions ===
There are three playable factions in EndWar:

- (European Union) The European Federation Enforcer Corps (EFEC), which is made up of veteran elite counter-terrorist and peacekeeping forces throughout Europe, especially skilled in urban warfare. Their units are lightly armored, but their vehicles move faster than the other factions, and their infantry can capture and upgrade control points faster. They also excel in electronic warfare, as well as advanced directed energy and microwave weapons. Their ranks notably contain many previous members of the elite counter-terrorist unit, Rainbow. Their WMD (weapon of mass destruction) is an Orbital Tactical High Energy Laser. Unit camouflages tend to consist of blues and greys with tiger or leopard patterns.
- The Russian Federation Spetsnaz Guards Brigade (SGB), which is composed of veterans of Russia's many regional conflicts, specializing in heavy weapons and heavy armor. They believe in winning at all costs, while still saving face. A few Rainbow veterans from Eastern Europe serve as Battalion commanders. Their WMD is a Fuel-Air Missile / Vacuum bomb, as are many of the 'special weapon' upgrades for units - e.g.: engineers and tanks gain access to flamethrowers, while artillery and gunships make use of fuel-air weaponry. Their units are more heavily armored and can hit harder, but they have the slowest movement speeds and shortest engagement range. The unit camouflages tend to contain mostly greens, with browns and blacks mixed in.
- The United States Joint Strike Force (JSF), led by Ghost Recon main character Scott Mitchell, is modeled after today's Marine Expeditionary Units. The J.S.F. is built around small units packing a precise punch, and is made up of elite servicemen from all branches of the United States Armed Forces. They also specialize in access to state-of-the-art stealth technology and battlefield robotics, such as UAVs and automated sentry drones. Their WMD is a Kinetic Strike. A few veteran Ghost Recon members serve as battalion commanders. The JSF specialize in long range combat, focusing on accurate fire before the enemy can get within retaliation range. Unit colors are mostly desert browns and tans, with more modern digitalized patters than the other two factions.

=== Units ===
There are seven types of units available for direct command: riflemen, engineers, tanks, transports, helicopter gunships, artillery, and command vehicles. Each unit type having combat advantages over others, allowing for rock-paper-scissors style of combat. Troops which have been with the player for many battles will be more effective than fresh recruits. De Plater, Creative Director, says this creates a "Pokémon-like" ownership of the player's units and will have a large effect on his tactics. "It's a battalion that you own," says de Plater. "You can personalize it. You can customize it. You can choose its motto and its heraldry. You can change its composition and abilities." According to a Pre-GC IGN article: "Each faction has roughly 150 upgrades and units have six levels of experience. These upgrades are where the seven unit types can gain great variety and specialization through three different ways-experience, equipment, and training, all of which have different effects and abilities. This allows many of the related unit types other games consider a different class have merely to be folded into one of the eight present in EndWar. For example, a rifleman may be upgraded to a sniper unit rather than having that unit type exist by itself."

Each unit type can be upgraded, improving their armor or offensive capability. Upgrades must be bought from points earned in the game, and once bought will be applied to every unit in that type once they reach the proper rank.

The player will not control individual soldiers, but much larger platoons and companies. The soldiers will behave realistically, using cover when available, using stealth when able, and military tactics. Veterans will hive higher combat efficiency due to their veteran bonuses and respective upgrades.

Craters, walls, debris, and buildings can be used for cover, and units can be pinned down by heavy enemy fire.

De Plater hinted at the game being streamlined with regards to units, resource management, etc. He stated that "every time they cut features out, it just made the game better." For example, only 12 groups are allowed under control at once. Also, the resource system will be stripped down compared to other RTS games. Each unit costs the same amount of resources, which are gained by capturing strategic points on the battlefield. Reinforcements will be handled realistically meaning all new units must be transported onto the battlefield by a transport vehicle (or in the case of helicopters, will fly in from off-screen).

To call in new units it costs between one and six CP (Command Points), Command Points are also used to call in airstrikes, force recon, and electronic warfare, the three kinds of off-map support. Command Points regenerate at a rate of around one point for every 30 seconds and are also gained for killing enemy units, the player gains a bonus of four Command Points for capturing an uplink.

=== Mission supports ===
There are also three mission supports that can be upgraded:

Air strikes that can be used to damage or destroy enemy units. Electronic warfare disrupts enemy communications, disables shields, reveals hidden traps and infantry, and immobilizes enemy vehicles and helicopters. Force Recon is a support that sends NPC-controlled regular army units to a designated location to defend it or to bolster friendly units defending there, to attack or occupy enemy held positions, or to distract or disrupt enemy maneuvers while the player's units prepare their own attacks. It consists of up to two infantry units, two FAVs (Fast Attack Vehicle) units, and two Tank units from the regular army, depending on the level of the mission support. All types of supports require a number of points to request, each increasing with every available level.

=== DEFCON 1 supports ===
When a battle reaches DEFCON 1 two supports are unlocked for the losing player; these are the ability to Crash an Uplink and deploy a WMD. When an uplink is crashed its upgrade can no longer be used and it no longer counts towards victory; Crashing an Uplink does not damage any units on the battlefield and can only be done once. A WMD, however, destroys all units within a large blast area, whether friendly or not. WMDs recharge slowly, so they can be used again. If the losing player uses a WMD, their opponent can retaliate by using a WMD of their own. Using the WMD will also destroy any destructible buildings in the blast radius, allowing for some tactical usage. Additionally, during DEFCON 1, units used as reinforcements only cost two Command Points.

=== Mission types ===
There are four types of missions in the game: conquest, assault, raid and siege.

- Conquest: These battles are the most common, as Conquest is the primary mode in EndWar. The player starts with up to four units and has access to reserves and off map support. The aim of this mission type is to maintain control over a majority of the uplinks for a five-minute period. The player can also win by controlling all of the uplinks on the map at once which grants an instant victory. When over half the uplinks are controlled, DEFCON 1 initiates and access to DEFCON 1 supports is granted.
- Assault: These battles are the most straightforward. To win this battle, the player must wipe out all enemy units.
- Raid: These battles are like conquest mode, but the player has to sabotage the enemy by destroying half of the key buildings on the map within ten minutes on offense or prevent them from being destroyed on defense. WMDs are not available.
- Siege: These battles are exclusive to capital cities and require the player to capture or defend a critical uplink identified by being larger than all other uplinks. The attacker must secure the uplink before reinforcements arrive in ten minutes. The defender will be given eight units and must hold on to the uplink for ten minutes time, at which point a massive Force Recon team deploys. Until the timer runs out, the defenders must do without any off-map support, including reinforcements and evacuation choppers, forcing units to fight to the last man. Off-map supports, including WMDs and reinforcements, are half the CP cost.

In all mission types, the player can also win by annihilating the enemy force.

=== Voice interface ===
Tom Clancy's EndWar offers the player a voice interface. Instead of controlling the game via mouse and keyboard, the player may optionally issue commands using a microphone. The voice interface is made possible by a speech recognition engine, supporting at least the English language.

Officials at Ubisoft Shanghai said it was also possible to control the game using only voice commands; Jeff Bakalar of CNET concurred, saying the demonstration he watched ran for twenty minutes without any perceptible faults.

Hearing enemy soldiers communicate gives the player a strategic advantage to counter the enemy's attack with one of their own. Ubisoft has even created a video showing parrots commanding units using their voice.

=== Point of view ===
The primary view in the game is from the perspective of one of the units under the player's command. The view can be moved a short distance from the selected unit or switched to that of another unit. Enemy units will only be detected if they are within the Line-of-Sight of a unit, which is a more realistic type of fog of war than is found in most other strategy games.

In addition to the units' point of view, there is a tactical map or Sitrep view, which shows the entire map with the locations of all allied and any visible enemy units which can be used to issue commands. Sitrep can only be accessed if a Command Vehicle is deployed on the battlefield.

== Development ==
=== Xbox 360 beta ===
A private beta test version was playable among Xbox Live Gold members. It included three maps and both 1v1 and 2v2 matches. The beta test began June 16, 2008 and ended July 9, 2008. Participants were placed under non-disclosure agreement until the game's first commercial launch.

=== Demo ===
The VIP demo for Xbox 360 users who pre-ordered the game was released a little more than a week late on October 11. The demo features one single-player story mission, one map that is playable in Skirmish mode with either 1 vs. 1 or 1 vs. AI, and a Voice Command Trainer.

The VIP demo has a campaign mission at Kennedy Space Center. The Skirmish mode features the European Federation versus the United States over the Kennedy Space Center in Conquest mode. The demo was released on the Xbox Live Marketplace on October 15, and on the PlayStation Store on October 30.

There is also a special code that appears when the user exits the demo, which is used to unlock a special Spetznaz battalion for use in the full game.

=== PlayStation 2 version ===
A version for PlayStation 2 was planned before eventually being cancelled.

== Marketing and release ==
The special edition of Rainbow Six Vegas 2 included a video with the first live gameplay footage of this game. There have been online advertisements, as well as an EndWar website at Endwargame.com.

Endwar's release date was pushed back three times originally planned to be released in 2007, but was pushed back to March 2008 and then to November 4, 2008.

=== Trailer ===
The first EndWar trailer released in 2007, displays an overhead map of Western Europe with only a large part of Spain and half of France under Joint Strike Force control, while the Russian Federation Spetsnaz has engrossed the rest of the continent. The camera then zooms to an ongoing battle in Paris, where a local Joint Strike Force commander, Major General Smith, directs the action from a mobile headquarters vehicle by using an interactive holographic map display. Outside, U.S. soldiers armed with assault rifles similar to the XM8, along with advanced IFVs, DPVs, and M5A2 Schwarzkopf tanks, attack Russian forces holding out at the Place de la Concorde and the Louvre museum.

Eventually, the US troops call in air support in the form of AH-80 Blackfoot attack helicopters and V-25 transports, forcing the Russians to retreat. However, the assault is short-lived, as in addition to a mechanized counterattack, the Russian forces launch multitudinous Tu-3 UCAVs that shoot down the helicopters right on top of the soldiers and nearly wiping out the entire Joint Strike Force.

Realizing this problematic situation in which the Spetsnaz are on the upper hand, General Smith issues voice attack commands to a Kinetic Strike satellite in orbit over Europe. Russian soldiers suppress him, as he emerges from his command vehicle.

Just before the Spetsnaz take him in as a prisoner of war, the general says, "Now." The satellite fires at least three kinetic rods down on his position, obliterating himself and the Russian Spetsnaz along with large portions of Paris. Smith's death would be mentioned in passing in the EndWar novel.

The music used in this trailer was composed by Michael McCann and can be found at his website. The music of a different trailer is The End of the World by Skeeter Davis.

=== Novelization ===
Endwar was published as a novel, on February 4, 2008, in paperback form. The back cover says "Based on Ubisoft's bestselling game, Tom Clancy's EndWar", despite the game not yet having been released at that time. The sequel Tom Clancy's EndWar: The Hunted was released on February 1, 2011, by Berkley Books. A second sequel Tom Clancy's EndWar: The Missing was released in 2013. The first two books are written by Grant Blackwood under the pseudonym David Michaels. The third book is written by Peter Telep.

== Downloadable content ==
Since release, Endwar has received the "Escalation" downloadable pack on the PlayStation Network and Xbox Live Marketplace which contains three new unit upgrades (one per faction) and four new maps playable in skirmish mode, as well as additional achievements/trophies. Another set of upgrades were released, entitled the "Faction Elite pack" which included six new unit upgrades (two per faction) and three new battalions (one per faction). Also, announced on March 13, two new missions on two new maps will be available for free. Their assault on Russia's Cosmodrome and conquest on the Strategic Petroleum Reserve in Richton, Mississippi, U.S.

== Reception ==
Reception

Aggregate scores
Aggregator	Score
GameRankings	70.36% (DS); 68.00% (PC); 77.76% (PS3); 69.67% (PSP); 78.13% (X360)
Metacritic	69% (DS); 68% (PC); 76% (PS3); 68% (PSP); 77% (X360)

Review scores
Publication	Score
1Up.com	C
Famitsu	34/40 (X360)
Game Informer	7.75/10
GameSpot	7.5/10 (PS3)
Official Xbox Magazine (US)	8.0/10

EndWar received mixed to positive reviews. The Guardian gave the game a 4/5. It was praised for its "Highly addictive solo play...the game comes into its own with the massively multiplayer online Theatre of War." while being docked somewhat for "occasional voice recognition blip". The website www.gametrailers.com gave EndWar a 9/10 saying that it was "Console strategy done right." IGN rated EndWar as an 8 out of 10 taking marks away for the "Uninspired single player campaign" but still saw it as a more than solid RTS. Gamespot's Kevin VanOrd rated the PS3 version of EndWar as a 7.5 out of 10, praising its "Innovative voice command mechanic" and stating "Persistent online campaign makes matches feel meaningful" but berated it for its lack of story and "simple rock-paper-scissors skirmishes". 1Up and Electronic Gaming Monthly both gave the game a C.

During the 12th Annual Interactive Achievement Awards, the Academy of Interactive Arts & Sciences nominated Tom Clancy's EndWar for "Strategy/Simulation Game of the Year" and "Outstanding Achievement in Gameplay Engineering".

== Cancelled sequel ==
A sequel to the game was confirmed to be in the early stages of development by Ubisoft's creative director Michael De Plater in an interview with VideoGamer.com. A small team from Ubisoft Shanghai is in charge of the development, he said, and "is concentrating on two areas of improvement – single-player story and depth". He could not, however, place a date as to when more information on the sequel would be released. On February 8, 2010, it was announced that the development of the sequel was canceled, due to the game's commercial failure.

On September 10, 2013, Ubisoft announced that Ubisoft Shanghai is working on EndWar Online for Windows and OS X, a browser-based free-to-play multiplayer online battle arena game which was released on December 3, 2015, however it was shut down indefinitely on October 31, 2016.
