= The Sum of All Fears =

1991 thriller novel by Tom Clancy

- First edition cover
- Author: Tom Clancy
- Language: English
- Series: Jack Ryan
- Release number: 5
- Genre: Political thriller; Techno-thriller; Military fiction; Realistic fiction
- Publisher: G.P. Putnam's Sons
- Publication date: August 14, 1991
- Publication place: United States
- Media type: Print (Hardcover, Paperback)
- Pages: 798
- ISBN: 0399136150
- Preceded by: Clear and Present Danger
- Followed by: Debt of Honor

The Sum of All Fears is a political thriller novel, written by Tom Clancy and released on August 14, 1991, as the sequel to Clear and Present Danger (1989). The main character Jack Ryan, who is now the Deputy Director of Central Intelligence, tries to stop a crisis concerning the Middle East peace process wherein Palestinian and former East German terrorists conspire to bring the United States and Soviet Union into a nuclear war. It debuted at number one on the New York Times bestseller list.

A film adaptation, which is a reboot of the Jack Ryan film series and starring Ben Affleck as the younger iteration of the CIA analyst, was released on May 31, 2002.

== Plot ==
During the first day of the Yom Kippur War in 1973, the Israeli Defense Force (IDF) prepares to conduct a tactical nuclear strike to stave off defeat. The necessity for the strike is averted, but an Israeli Mark 12 nuclear bomb is accidentally left on an A-4 Skyhawk attack aircraft, which is subsequently shot down over Syria near Kafr Shams. The nuclear weapon is lost, buried in the field of a Druze farmer.

Eighteen years later, an Israeli police captain kills a Palestinian demonstrator during a peaceful protest at the Temple Mount. The United States finds it hard to diplomatically defend Israel, yet knows it cannot withdraw its support without risk of destabilizing the Middle East. Following the advice of Deputy Director of Central Intelligence (DDCI) Jack Ryan, National Security Advisor Dr. Charles Alden enacts a plan to accelerate the peace process by converting Jerusalem into a Vatican-like independent city-state to be administered by a tribunal of Jewish, Muslim, Roman Catholic, and Eastern Orthodox religious leaders, and secured by an independent contingent of the Swiss Guards. Ryan's plan works, and with their religious contentions appeased, the factions in the Middle East find it much easier to negotiate their disputes.

Alden is later involved in a sex scandal that causes his death, and is succeeded by White House Foreign Affairs Advisor Elizabeth Elliot, who holds a grudge against Ryan. She begins a sexual relationship with U.S. president J. Robert Fowler and manipulates him into publicly omitting Ryan's role in the peace settlement. Elliot also engineers a smear campaign accusing Ryan of engaging in an extramarital affair and fathering a child with the young widow of an Air Force pilot who was killed on a classified operation in Colombia. (Note: As depicted in Clear and Present Danger) CIA operatives John Clark and Domingo "Ding" Chavez, who were involved in the operation and now working for Ryan, convince his wife Cathy that the allegations are false. Ryan later decides to retire from the CIA, but not before he puts together a covert operation to uncover corrupt dealings between Japanese and Mexican government officials.

Meanwhile, a small group of Popular Front for the Liberation of Palestine (PFLP) terrorists, led by Ismael Qati, come across the lost Israeli bomb and use it to construct their own weapon by using the bomb's plutonium pit as fissile material for a new bomb. Qati and PFLP's explosives expert Ibrahim Ghosn enlist the help of disaffected East German nuclear physicist Manfred Fromm to enhance the bomb into a boosted fission weapon. They plot to detonate the bomb at the Super Bowl in Denver, while simultaneously staging a false flag attack on U.S. military forces stationed in Berlin by East Germans disguised as Soviet soldiers, in order to cause a nuclear war between the U.S. and the Soviet Union.

Thinking that his work on the bomb is complete, the Palestinians kill Fromm. However, Fromm had not yet told them that the tritium for the booster still needed to be filtered before use, to eliminate accumulated helium-3. The Palestinians assemble the bomb for use, but when detonated, the impure booster material causes only a low yield fizzle to occur. Even with low yield, the bomb still destroys the Super Bowl venue, killing nearly everyone there including the Secretary of Defense, the Secretary of State, and the commander of NORAD. With the corresponding attacks in Berlin, the United States briefly assumes DEFCON-1 status as Fowler and Elliott prepare for a nuclear war. The crisis is averted by Ryan, who learns of the domestic origin of the bomb's plutonium, gains access to the hotline, and convinces the Soviet President to stand down his country's military.

When the terrorists are captured and interrogated by Clark in Mexico City, they implicate the Iranian Ayatollah in the attack. President Fowler orders the Ayatollah's residence in the holy city of Qom to be destroyed by a nuclear strike. Ryan averts the attack by enforcing the two-man rule. The terrorists are delivered to the FBI field office in Buzzard Point, where Ryan questions them. During questioning, Ryan falsely asserts that Qom was destroyed, tricking Qati into revealing that Iran was not involved, and that their deceit was meant to discredit the United States; thus destroying the peace process and allowing the campaign against Israel to continue. Elliot is sedated after suffering a nervous breakdown, while Fowler resigns from office and is succeeded by his Vice President, Roger Durling.

The terrorists are executed by beheading in Riyadh by the commander of the Saudi Arabian special forces using an ancient sword owned by the Saudi royal family. Later, the sword is presented to Ryan as a gift. In the sequels, the gift (combined with his origins as a Marine) inspires Ryan's Secret Service codename of "Swordsman."

== Characters ==
=== The United States government ===
- Jack Ryan: Deputy Director of Central Intelligence. He develops the Vatican Treaty providing a final settlement on the Arab-Israeli conflict, but is overworked and unappreciated by President Fowler, who is unable to replace Ryan due to the latter's popularity in Congress. He also has a deep rivalry with Dr. Elliot. As a result, he begins to develop alcoholism and increasingly poor health. He later decides to retire from the agency in order to overcome his drinking problem and spend more time with his family. During the events of the novel, Ryan becomes increasingly concerned about the growing economic dominance of Japan, which becomes a theme in the following novel Debt of Honor.
- J. Robert Fowler: President of the United States. Fowler was introduced in Clear and Present Danger as the Governor of Ohio and a presidential candidate, and won against the incumbent President after he deliberately threw the election. Fowler is depicted as a former prosecutor opposed to capital punishment and in favor of broad social programs, although he angers Dr. Elliot and many of his supporters by refusing to commute the death sentences of the Ulster Liberation Army members depicted in Patriot Games. He is nicknamed "Hawk" by the U.S. Secret Service. He was widowed after his wife died from multiple sclerosis, and begins a romantic relationship with Dr. Elizabeth Elliot. He is motivated by his public image and desire to secure a legacy, and as a result takes credit for Ryan's program. After the crisis on the Denver bombing, during which his decision-making deteriorates rapidly, he resigned from office and was succeeded by his Vice President, Roger Durling. According to an audio commentary in the DVD release of the film adaptation, Clancy has said that he based Fowler on 1988 Democratic presidential candidate Michael Dukakis, claiming that left-wing politicians are more likely to use nuclear weapons than right-wing ones.
- Elizabeth Elliot: Key advisor to President Fowler, and his lover. A former professor of political science at Bennington College, she was promised the position of National Security Advisor but later denied on the insistence of Fowler's running mate Durling. At the beginning of the book, she finally achieves the position using a sex scandal against Dr. Charles Alden, and nearly derails Ryan's plan by withholding a new radar system from Israel to coerce them to accept the deal. Holding a grudge on Ryan from their first encounter (depicted in previous novel Clear and Present Danger), she denies him credit for the Middle East peace plan and falsely leaks to the media that he has a mistress, severely straining his marriage. Her advice worsens the situation during the Denver crisis and she is later placed under sedation. She is nicknamed "Harpy" by the U.S. Secret Service.
- Arnold "Arnie" van Damm: Chief of Staff to President Fowler. Van Damm is known for his informal dress style and his alertness to intrigue. Although he is personally areligious, he works with Ryan to consult the Vatican over his peace deal. Asks Ryan for his resignation the morning after Elliot is confronted by Cathy Ryan over Elliot's media leaks, and they agree that Ryan can stay two weeks to wrap up Operation NIITAKA.
- Brent Talbot: Secretary of State. Talbot is a former Northwestern University professor of political science. He is killed in the Denver bombing.
- Scott Adler: Deputy Secretary of State.
- G. Dennis Bunker: Secretary of Defense. Bunker is a decorated former U.S. Air Force captain from the Vietnam War, flying a hundred F-105 combat missions and earning three Distinguished Flying Crosses during the bombing of Hanoi. He later gained fame by constructing a large business conglomerate in southern California and gaining ownership of the San Diego Chargers, and he bonds with the President over their mutual love of football. He is killed in the Denver bombing.
- John Clark: Ryan's personal driver and bodyguard, former CIA operative.
- Domingo “Ding” Chavez: Clark's partner, CIA field operative. Works as Ryan's bodyguard while studying for a degree at George Mason University.
- Dan Murray: Deputy Assistant Director of the Federal Bureau of Investigation
- Marcus Cabot: Director of Central Intelligence. Although he is initially inexperienced and adversarial towards Ryan, he grows to respect him after the Vatican Treaty.
- Ben Goodley: Ryan's assistant and protégé. A postdoctoral fellow at Harvard Kennedy School, he became noticed by the White House and the CIA for his analysis of the Cuban Missile Crisis, and is researching a thesis on the Vietnam War. Initially manipulated by Elliot into providing classified information on Ryan, which she would later use in her attempt to discredit him. Ryan's diligence and professionalism with intelligence information during Elliot's attacks makes Goodley rethink his initial opinions of Elliot and Ryan.
- Inspector Sean Patrick "Pat" O’Day: FBI agent who is Murray's second-in-command.
- Dr. Charles Alden: A Yale professor of history who becomes the first National Security Advisor to President Fowler. Alden is a brilliant tactician who has a good relationship with Ryan despite their differing political views. However, his tendency to have affairs allows him to be undercut by Elliot, and he dies of a stroke after his affair with a student is discovered.
- Alan Trent: "Japan-bashing" Chairman of the U.S. House Permanent Select Committee on Intelligence.

=== The United States military ===
- Bart Mancuso: Full captain (selected for Rear Admiral) commanding a squadron of ballistic missile submarines for the United States Pacific Fleet.
- Captain James "Jim" Rosselli: Duty officer at the National Military Command Center at the Pentagon during the Denver crisis, and former commanding officer of the Gold Crew of USS Maine, an Ohio-class submarine (the real-life Maine was launched in 1994, three years ahead of the novel's timeline).
- Captain Harrison Sharpe "Harry" Ricks: Commanding officer of the Gold Crew of Maine, succeeding Rosselli. Dies after the Maine sinks following an explosion in his ship's wake from a torpedo launched by the Soviet nuclear-powered attack submarine Admiral Lunin.
- Robby Jackson: Commander of the air group assigned to USS Theodore Roosevelt, an American aircraft carrier.

=== The Soviet Union ===
- Andrey Illich Narmonov: President of the Soviet Union, first introduced in The Hunt for Red October. He attempts to carry out democratization reforms in the Soviet Union during the events of the novel but is hindered by an unstable political system. His assistance helps to bring the Eastern Orthodox Church to support the Vatican Treaty. President Narmonov dislikes Fowler, finding him to be arrogant and overly controlling.
- Sergey Golovko: First Deputy Chairman of the Committee for State Security (KGB).
- Oleg Kirilovich Kadishev: Leader of the opposition party in the Congress of People's Deputies of the Soviet Union and opportunistic CIA agent (codename SPINNAKER). His false reports to the CIA unfortunately reinforces the narrative that Narmonov has lost control of the Soviet military. This convinces Fowler and Elliot that the Soviet president had been a victim of a coup d'etat following the Denver bombing, which progressively worsens their judgment of the crisis.
- Oleg Yurevich Lyalin: A KGB illegal based in Japan who has a well-developed network of agents codenamed THISTLE. He uncovers the Japanese Prime Minister's corrupt dealings with Mexico over trade agreements and offers his services to the CIA, which accepts him (codename MUSHASHI). Based on his intelligence, Ryan launches Operation NIITAKA, which later becomes instrumental in blackmailing the President of Mexico into allowing the arrest of Qati and Ghosn in Mexico City after the Denver bombing. Unfortunately, he was caught by the Soviets and charged with treason, but Ryan pleads with Golovko to free Lyalin since he did not reveal Soviet state secrets.
- Valentin Borissovich Dubinin: Captain First Rank of the Soviet Navy and commanding officer of the Akula-class submarine Admiral Lunin.

=== The terrorists ===
- Ismael Qati: Palestinian terrorist and mastermind of the bomb plot. He is suffering from terminal cancer. After being captured by Clark in Mexico City, he was later executed in Saudi Arabia.
- Ibrahim Ghosn: Palestinian terrorist and one of PFLP's experts on explosives and electronics. It is stated that he nearly received a degree in engineering from the American University of Beirut but was prevented from formally completing his studies due to the 1982 Lebanon War. Allied with Qati, he is also executed along with him in Saudi Arabia.
- Günther Bock: German terrorist and ally of Qati and Ghosn. A former Red Army Faction member, the collapse of Marxism, coupled with the arrest of his wife and fellow terrorist Petra Hassler-Bock as well as the loss of their children, forces him to go into hiding. After learning about the Soviet Union's cooperation with the United States in combating terrorism and Petra's suicide, he is motivated to trigger a nuclear war with the U.S. and Russia by arranging a false-flag attack on American and Soviet forces in Berlin. Later killed during the battle and was identified by the German police.
- Marvin Russell: Professional criminal, drug dealer, and activist for the fictional Native American Warrior Society. A Sioux Indian living in the Badlands. Along with his brother John Russell, he had a history of juvenile delinquency while living with their impoverished family at a reservation in Minnesota and spent a year in prison. He developed a resentment towards the United States. After his brother is killed in a botched FBI operation, he travels to Europe to connect with international terrorists, gaining the trust of Qati by killing an undercover Hellenic Police officer in Athens and by comparing the Indian Wars to the Israeli–Palestinian conflict. He helps Qati and Ghosn enter the United States with the bomb. Deemed as a security risk, he was murdered by the two Palestinian terrorists in a Denver motel on the day of the nuclear detonation, but their sloppy work allows the FBI to ascertain the circumstances behind the bomb.
- Dr. Manfred Fromm: German engineer and terrorist who is recruited by Bock to assist in rebuilding and improving the captured Israeli nuclear weapon. Later executed by Qati's men after his services were complete, unaware that Dr. Fromm had not yet finished the bomb.

=== Israel ===
- General Abraham "Avi" Ben Jakob: Assistant director of the Mossad, Israel's foreign intelligence agency. Depicted as a friend of Ryan, he helps convince the Israeli Cabinet to accept the Fowler Plan after meeting with him despite his distrust of the U.S. government.
- Rafi Mandel: The Defense Minister of Israel. Mandel initially opposes the treaty but accepts it after admitting that Israel's security status has improved from it and after Prime Minister Askenazi promises to support his planned bid for Prime Minister
- David Askenazi: The Prime Minister of Israel.
- Captain Benjamin "Benny" Zadin: An Israeli National Police officer in command in a demonstration at the Temple Mount in Jerusalem. Embittered by his personal problems, he kills an unarmed demonstrator there. Coincidentally the younger brother of Lieutenant Mordecai "Mutti" Zadin, an Israeli Air Force pilot who was shot down by Syrian surface-to-air missiles during the Yom Kippur War, unaware that he was carrying a nuclear weapon. The younger Zadin is ultimately committed to a mental institution.

=== The Muslim world ===
- Prince Ali bin-Sheik: Crown Prince of Saudi Arabia
- Ayatollah Mahmoud Haji Daryaei: The Supreme Leader of Iran. Opposes the Vatican Treaty, and is falsely implicated by the terrorists in the Denver bombing.
- Hashimi Moussa: A 20-year-old Arab sociology student in Jerusalem and the leader of the demonstrations. Hashimi, who bears physical scars from police beatings, convinces the demonstrators not to enter the Temple Mount and adopt nonviolent protest, resulting in Israel losing international sympathy. Hashimi is killed by Captain Zadin.

=== Others ===
- Bob Holtzman: Senior White House correspondent for The Washington Post, used by Elliot to discreetly out Ryan as being suspected of financial and marital improprieties. After being confronted with Clark's evidence of Ryan's innocence, he exposes Elliot's part in the whole affair.
- Cathy Ryan: Ophthalmic surgeon at the Wilmer Eye Institute at the Johns Hopkins University School of Medicine. Becomes troubled with media reports of her husband Jack having a mistress, but is convinced by Clark, Chavez and Murray that the reports are lies. She then publicly embarrasses Elliot at a White House dinner, whom she knew from her student days at Bennington College. She is pregnant with Katie by the end of the novel.
- Carol Zimmer: Hmong American widow of Sergeant Buck Zimmer (detailed in Clear and Present Danger). Ryan helps her and her family through an educational trust fund as well as setting up a 7-Eleven convenience store to supplement her family income. Elliot assumed this was proof that Zimmer is Ryan's mistress.
- Solomon Mendelev: An Orthodox Jewish rabbi from New York City who accuses the U.S. government of trying to subjugate Israel through the Treaty. Although he has never set foot in Israel himself due to his religious beliefs, he sparks widespread opposition to the Treaty among the Israeli public, and Dr. Elliot's attitude towards him worsens Ryan's relations with her.

== Themes ==
Written under the working title The Field of Camlan, which was based on King Arthur's final battle, The Sum of All Fears explores nuclear fears that humans endured during the Cold War, with Clancy warning that complacency regarding such threats is dangerous. Published months after the first Gulf War, Clancy also envisioned a fictional “next great step” toward lasting peace in the Middle East. The book was said to be inspired by the 1977 thriller film Black Sunday, which depicts a blimp being used as a weapon to blow up a football stadium during the Super Bowl; the movie was referenced three times.

A major theme is the limits and uncertainties surrounding information collected by intelligence agencies and the need for policy makers to acknowledge such limits and uncertainties: "There is a difference between not knowing anything and understanding that you don't know."

The novel also explores the danger of "electing someone who covets power for all the wrong reasons and who is totally inept at managing it", according to Marc Cerasini's essay on the book. President Fowler and Elliot were compared to Bill and Hillary Clinton.

=== Etymology ===
The title is a reference to nuclear war and to the plot by the novel's antagonists to reconstruct a lost nuclear weapon. It comes from a Winston Churchill quote serving as the first of the novel's two epigraphs:

Why, you may take the most gallant sailor, the most intrepid airman or the most audacious soldier, put them at a table together—what do you get? The sum of their fears.

=== Jerusalem background ===
The Vatican-like solution for Jerusalem, which was implemented in the book, is ultimately derived from the 1947 United Nations Partition Plan for Palestine, which indeed provided for making Jerusalem such a "Corpus separatum" (Latin for "separated body"). The course which the 1948 Palestine war took prevented implementation of this plan. In later years, various peace plans and diplomatic initiatives sought to revive the idea, but in reality it has never come close to implementation. The plan is known for being popular outside the Middle East, but unpopular among the actual residents of Jerusalem, who would prefer that their "side" should rule entirely rather than submit to a neutral administration.

=== Rainbow Six reference ===
A database file with certain limited details about John Clark is included as background information within the first Rainbow Six game, and moreover, the same database entry is also found in many of the sequels. That entry mentions in passing that "the Denver, Colorado atomic detonation [occurred] in 1989". That information might not be canonical, since the book is set after both the fall of the Berlin Wall (November 9, 1989) and the First Persian Gulf War (January–February 1991). If it is canonical, though, this means that the book is not set in the same year it was published. A second inference is that 1989 was likely the year in which President Fowler's administration ended.

== Development ==
Clancy started working on the novel in 1979, setting the first chapter during the Yom Kippur War. Then he abandoned his idea for other novels until he wrote The Cardinal of the Kremlin (1988), where Ryan first meets Russian premier Narmonov. After figuring out the resolution to The Sum of All Fears, Clancy then used his next novel Clear and Present Danger (1989) as a way to introduce future President Fowler. Speaking of the consistency, Clancy said: "The whole series really is a logical and connected network of plot lines which would continue to diverge and converge throughout the body of the work." The novel was notable for detailing the process in making a bomb; however, certain technical details were altered, and Clancy made clear in the novel's afterword that a lot of information in his book can be found in the public domain.

Whilst the Israelis used both the A-4 single-seat single-engine subsonic light attack jet and F-4 two-seat twin-engined all-weather supersonic fighter-bomber during the Yom Kippur War, use of the A-4's nuclear capability was never envisaged. Nuclear warheads were assembled at the Tel Nof Airbase, but for deployment on F-4 rather than A-4 as told in the novel. This was done on October 8 in such a way that the U.S. got to know of it by the next morning, prompting President Nixon to initiate the same day an immediate air-lifted re-supply to Israel of conventional arms, including tanks and planes to replace losses, in Operation Nickel Grass. Whether any of these nuclear bombs were actually carried during a sortie has never been documented.

At least one real-world buried nuclear warhead has actually been documented however, but American and in the U.S., rather than Israeli in Syria. The plutonium pit of a Mark 39 nuclear bomb warhead remains buried 33m deep in a North Carolina field, now fenced-off, following the fatal 1961 Goldsboro B-52 crash. Many B-52 Stratofortresses crashed while carrying live nuclear warheads on training flights, mostly inside the U.S., between 1961 and 1968, but many have been recovered.

== Reception ==
=== Commercial ===
The book entered at number 138 on the USA Today's Best-selling Books list for the week of August 18, 1994, and later peaked at number three.

=== Critical ===
The book received positive reviews. Publishers Weekly praised the novel as "a nonstop roller-coaster ride to a nail-biting finish", adding: "Fundamentally, Clancy is writing about a vital and elusive quality: grace under pressure. Whether terrorists or statesmen, Clancy's characters face a common challenge—situations that break down pretensions of rank, power and ideology. Their responses, carefully and empathetically constructed, make this book compelling instead of merely ingenious." Kirkus Reviews hailed it as "hair-raising" and "quite a rouser".

== Film adaptation ==
The book was adapted as a feature film, which was released on May 31, 2002. Jack Ryan was played by Ben Affleck while John Clark was played by Liev Schreiber; additionally, CIA director Marcus Cabot, whose first name was changed into William, was played by Morgan Freeman. The film is a reboot that departs from all previous Ryan films, and as a result, there were significant changes from the book, such as the antagonists being neo-Nazis instead of Palestinian terrorists, Ryan becoming a low-level CIA analyst, and the time period changed to 2002. Clancy served as executive producer on the film, and regarding the changes from his book, jokingly introduced himself in the commentary track on the DVD release as "the author of the book that he [director Phil Alden Robinson, who is present with Clancy] ignored". Nevertheless, he complained about technical inaccuracies throughout the film in the commentary.

The Sum of All Fears was a major financial success, grossing a total of $193 million in box office. However, it received mixed reviews from critics; Rotten Tomatoes reported that 59% of critics gave the film positive reviews and that the average rating was 6/10 based on a total of 171 reviews counted.

In turn, the film had its video game adaptation, which is a tactical first-person shooter game that is similar to the Rainbow Six series of games. It was developed by Red Storm Entertainment and released by Ubisoft in 2002.
