= Rainbow Six (novel) =

1998 thriller novel by Tom Clancy

- First edition cover
- Author: Tom Clancy
- Language: English
- Series: John Clark
- Release number: 2
- Genre: Techno-thriller; Military fiction; Medical fiction; Crime fiction; Realistic fiction
- Publisher: G.P. Putnam's Sons
- Publication date: August 3, 1998
- Publication place: United States
- Media type: Print (hardcover, paperback)
- Pages: 740
- ISBN: 0399143904
- Preceded by: Without Remorse
- Followed by: The Bear and the Dragon

Rainbow Six is a techno-thriller novel written by Tom Clancy and released on August 3, 1998. It is the second book to primarily focus on John Clark, one of the recurring characters in the Ryanverse, after Without Remorse (1993); it also features his son-in-law, Domingo "Ding" Chavez. Rainbow Six follows "Rainbow", a secret international counterterrorist organization headed by Clark (codenamed "Rainbow Six"), and the complex apocalyptic conspiracy they unravel after handling multiple seemingly random terrorist attacks.

The novel debuted at number one on The New York Times Best Seller list. It received mixed reviews from critics, who praised the action scenes and suspense but criticized the writing of some characters and its unrealistic plot. It also received some backlash from the environmental movement for its negative depiction of radical environmentalism. Clark, Chavez, and Rainbow later appeared in Clancy's next novel The Bear and the Dragon (2000).

Rainbow Six was adapted into a video game, Tom Clancy's Rainbow Six, which was developed by Red Storm Entertainment in tandem with the novel and released in August 1998 to critical and commercial success, spawning a highly successful series of video games currently owned by Ubisoft. A film adaptation, set to be the sequel to the 2021 film adaptation of Without Remorse, was announced in 2017 and was confirmed to be directed by Chad Stahelski in 2023, with an unannounced release date.

== Plot ==
Following a post-Cold War rise in terrorism, CIA officer John Clark forms a top secret international counterterrorist organization known as Rainbow, based in Hereford. Rainbow consists of two teams of elite special forces operatives from NATO countries, supported by intelligence and technology experts from the FBI, MI6, and Mossad. Clark serves as Rainbow's commanding officer (call sign "Rainbow Six") while SAS officer Alistair Stanley is his second in command; the two teams are each led by CIA officer Domingo "Ding" Chavez (Clark's son-in-law) and SAS member Peter Covington.

Rainbow finds themselves deployed to a bank robbery in Bern, followed by a hostage-taking at a schloss in Vienna committed by Cold War-era German left-wing terrorists. They are also sent to a hostage crisis at an amusement park in Madrid, where Basque separatists demand the release of Carlos the Jackal from a French prison. After swiftly resolving the incidents, Clark and his colleagues investigate the attacks, which occurred within a few weeks of each other.

Unbeknownst to Rainbow, the attacks at Bern and Vienna were orchestrated by ex-KGB officer Dimitry Popov, ordered by biotechnology firm Horizon Corporation's CEO John Brightling as part of his secret radical environmentalist plot, "the Project". Viewing humanity as a "disease" for causing environmental destruction, Brightling plans to wipe out nearly all of humanity using a modified strain of the Ebola virus (Note: As depicted in Executive Orders) named "Shiva", created using unethical human experimentation. The attacks were meant to spread global fears of terrorism, allowing co-conspirator Bill Henriksen's security firm to secure a contract for the Olympic Games in Sydney, where Shiva would be released through Stadium Australia's fog-cooling systems, infecting the attendees who would then spread it across the world. A fake deadlier Shiva "vaccine" distributed by Horizon would kill any survivors, while the real vaccine would be introduced to inoculate Brightling's "chosen few" to inherit the emptied Earth.

Popov discovers the existence of Rainbow when he reviews footage of the apparent police tactical teams that thwarted his attacks (in fact these were Rainbow in disguise). Brightling and Henriksen order him to orchestrate an attack on Rainbow, for which he recruits a Provisional Irish Republican Army splinter group to seize the hospital near Rainbow's base in Hereford and take Clark's wife Sandra and Chavez's pregnant wife Patricia as hostages, luring the arriving Rainbow team into an ambush that results in casualties. Nevertheless, they retake the hospital and capture the PIRA cell leader, who confirms Popov's involvement.

Brightling moves Popov to Horizon's remote facility in Kansas, where co-conspirator Foster Hunnicutt inadvertently reveals to him the full scope of the Project. Appalled by what he had unknowingly assisted, Popov kills Hunnicutt, flees the facility, and turns himself in to Clark and the FBI. Popov reveals the details of the Project to Clark (in exchange for not being charged with his activities), allowing Chavez and his team, who had been deployed to Sydney to evaluate security measures, to stop its release at the last minute.

Their plans now ruined, Brightling and his co-conspirators flee to a secret Horizon compound in the Amazon rainforest. Clark personally leads Rainbow in an assault on the compound, easily eliminating their untrained guards and capturing Brightling and the survivors. Aware that Brightling will likely avoid prosecution and will inevitably restart the Project once freed, Clark orders the compound razed, has the Project members stripped of their clothes, and leaves them to fend for themselves in the jungle.

Six months later, Horizon achieves medical breakthroughs under new management, Popov becomes wealthy after finding a rich gold deposit at Hunnicutt's former property, and Clark informs Chavez that no human activity has been detected near the Horizon compound ever since. Musing on nature's disregard for friend or foe, Clark surmises that humanity must be its own worst enemy.

== Characters ==
=== Team Rainbow ===
==== Executive and support branches ====
- John Clark: Commander of Rainbow
- Alistair Stanley: Deputy Commander
- Bill Tawney: Head of the intelligence section, former MI6 intelligence analyst
- Dr. Paul Bellow: Resident psychologist specializing in criminal psychology, FBI agent
- Tim Noonan: Resident tactical electronics and surveillance specialist, FBI special agent
- David Peled: Technical staff lead, Mossad agent
- Sam Bennett: Communications officer, U.S. Air Force major
- Daniel "Bear" Malloy: Pilot of Rainbow's MH-60K Night Hawk helicopter, United States Marine Corps lieutenant colonel
  - Harrison: Malloy's co-pilot, United States Air Force first lieutenant, former 1st Special Operations Wing pilot
  - Jack Nance: Mallow and Harrison's helicopter crew chief, Royal Air Force sergeant
- Dave Woods: Firing range instructor, British colour sergeant
- Alice Foorgate and Helen Montgomery: Executive secretaries
- Katherine Moony: Secretary

==== Team-1 ====
- Major Peter Covington: Team-1 commander, SAS member
- Miguel "Mike" Chin: Former United States Navy SEAL, Master Chief Machinist's Mate
- Mortimer "Sam" Houston: Sniper-observer
- Fred "Freddy" Franklin: Rifle 1-2, former United States Army Marksmanship Unit instructor and Army Ranger at Fort Benning
- Geoff Bates: Former British SAS member

==== Team-2 ====
- Domingo "Ding" Chavez: Team-2 commander, former CIA Special Activities Division member, Clark's son-in-law, and former Army Special Operations soldier
- Eddie Price: Deputy Commander, Senior member, former SAS sergeant major, pipe smoker
- Julio "Oso" Vega: heavy weapons operator, former Delta Force member
- Louis Loiselle: Specialist, former DGSE member
- George Tomlinson: Former Delta Force member
- Mike Pierce: Former 82nd Airborne Division member
- Steve Lincoln: Former SAS member
- Scotty McTyler: Former SAS member
- Hank Patterson: Former Delta Force member
- Paddy Connolly: Demolitions expert, former SAS member
- Homer Johnston: Sniper, former Delta Force member
- Dieter Weber: Sniper, German former GSG 9 Feldwebel

=== Horizon Corporation and the Project ===
- John Brightling: Billionaire chairman of Horizon Corporation, mastermind of the Project
- Bill Henriksen: Security consultant, head of Global Security, former FBI agent and Hostage Rescue Team member
- Carol Brightling: Science Advisor to the President, "former" wife of John Brightling (their divorce being a ruse used to safeguard her position, enabling her to pass government secrets to Horizon)
- John Killgore: Senior research scientist involved in testing the Shiva virus
- Barbara Archer: Researcher involved in testing the Shiva virus
- Kirk Maclean: Researcher tasked with kidnapping homeless men and single women in New York City to be used as Shiva test subjects; also a member of the Sierra Club
- Steve Berg: Researcher tasked with developing the vaccine to Shiva
- Lani Palacheck: Researcher working under John Killgore, on Shiva transmission study
- Mark Waterhouse: Recruiter for Brightling
- Foster Hunnicutt: Survivalist, member of Brightling's "chosen few"
- Wilson Gearing: Former United States Army Chemical Corps lieutenant colonel, tasked with releasing Shiva at the Olympics
- David Dawson: Chief of security at the OLYMPUS base, ex-Army
- Benjamin Farmer: Ex-Marine, security guard for Horizon
- Dick Voss: Former Army sergeant major at Fort Bragg (Special Operations Training Center), now working for Global Security

=== Other characters ===
- Dmitriy Arkadyevich Popov: Former KGB operations officer let go due to budget cuts, working for Brightling
- Sandra "Sandy" Clark: John Clark's wife, nurse
- Patricia "Patsy" Clark-Chavez: John Clark's daughter and Domingo Chavez's pregnant wife, MD
- Ernst Model: Sociopathic former Red Army Faction member who leads the botched bank robbery in Bern
- Hans Fürchtner: Left-wing terrorist, recruited by Popov to take over the schloss of a wealthy Austrian businessman
- Petra Dortmund: Left-wing terrorist, Fürchtner's longtime partner
- Erwin Ostermann: Austrian financier taken hostage by Fürchtner and Dortmund at his schloss
- Andre Herr: Former Action Directe member leading the terrorists at Worldpark
- Sean Grady: Hardline Provisional IRA cell commander who leads the attack on the Hereford hospital
- Tom Sullivan: FBI agent based in New York investigating Mary Bannister's disappearance
- Frank Chatham: FBI agent, Sullivan's partner
- Ed Foley: Director of Central Intelligence
- Mary Pat Foley: CIA Deputy Director for Operations and Ed Foley's wife
- Mary Bannister: Shiva test subject who manages to email her father, alerting the FBI

== Themes ==
Rainbow Six explores the issue of radical environmentalism. According to Marc Cerasini's essay on the novel, the philosophy of the antagonists are considered as an extreme form of naturalism, based on Jean-Jacques Rousseau's view that society's functions corrupt mankind and that "a natural or primitive state is actually morally superior to civilization". The novel shares elements found in James Bond movies: a biological weapon being used to end or rather cull the human race, mad scientists plotting world domination, and high-tech secret bases hidden from civilization. Clancy makes the plot relevant and morally ambiguous by incorporating motivations similar to those of real-life radical ecocentric environmentalists and deep ecologists, such as Pentti Linkola and Paul R. Ehrlich, rather than blanket hunger for power and brash misanthropic resentment. In several regards, critics have noted similarities in the John Brightling population control and humanity view regard to the later-released Agent Smith from The Matrix, Richmond Valentine from Kingsman: The Secret Service, Bertrand Zobrist from Dan Brown's Inferno, those of Thanos in Marvel's Avengers: Infinity War and Avengers: Endgame and Alan Jonah and Emma Russell from Godzilla: King of the Monsters.

== Development ==
The concept of Rainbow Six was conceived from a discussion between Clancy and Doug Littlejohns, a former Royal Navy submarine commander and CEO of Red Storm Entertainment, a video game development company co-founded by Clancy in 1996. Their discussion occurred during a Red Storm company outing in Colonial Williamsburg, when Littlejohns suggested a strategy shooter game based on the FBI Hostage Rescue Team. When Clancy mentioned that he was writing a novel about a hostage rescue team, their conversation led to Littlejohns noting the protracted diplomatic delays in authorizing a foreign counterterrorist unit's deployment overseas, and he suggested the concept of a permanent counterterrorist unit that already had authorization to deploy internationally. The name "Rainbow" came from the term "Rainbow nation", a term coined by Desmond Tutu to describe post-apartheid South Africa under Nelson Mandela's presidency. "Six" came from the American rank code for captain (O-6); though Clark would more accurately be described as a major general (O-8) in the novel, "Rainbow Six" read better than "Rainbow Eight". The strategy shooter game Littlejohns suggested was eventually developed into Tom Clancy's Rainbow Six.

== Reception ==
=== Commercial ===
The book debuted at number one on the New York Times bestseller list. It also debuted at number one on the USA Today's Best-selling Books list for the week of August 13, 1998.

=== Critical ===
The book received mixed reviews. Entertainment Weekly praised the novel's "sprawling, Bondesque plot" as well as its action scenes that are "vivid and cinematic—and notably lacking in the clichés and B-movie tone of his dialogue". Publishers Weekly also hailed the scenes as "immensely suspenseful, breathtaking combos of expertly detailed combat and primal emotion".

Criticism focused on flat characters and the implausibility of the plot. A review from Orlando Sentinel stated: "Clancy may have crossed the line into the realm of the unbelievable...I suspect even some of his most rabid fans will shake their heads at parts of this novel." Entertainment Weekly also noted that "some of [Clancy's] secondary characters have a flat, dime-novel feel". Canadian environmentalist Paul Watson condemned the book as "a vicious defamation of the Environmentalist Movement, embodying, amplifying and packaging all the worst stereotypes and prejudices."

== Adaptations ==
=== Video game ===
Tom Clancy's Rainbow Six was released on August 21, 1998, about two weeks after the release of the novel. It was developed alongside the novel and bases its plot on an early manuscript of the story. The game was developed by Red Storm Entertainment (which was co-founded by Clancy in 1996) based on their preexisting concept of the FBI Hostage Rescue Team in an international setting. Tom Clancy's Rainbow Six was a commercial success for Red Storm and spawned a number of sequels, now developed by Ubisoft. It revolutionized the first-person shooter genre by forcing the player to think tactically and realistically in every mission, unlike the arcade-style shooters of the time.

=== Film adaptation ===
The film rights to the novel were brought to Paramount Pictures by Michael Ovitz through his Artists Management Group in March 1999, with writer Jonathan Hensleigh in talks to pen the screenplay adaptation, and Ovitz attached as producer. Other screenwriters including Michael Schiffer, Bill Wisher, Art Monterastelli, Frank Cappello, and John Enbom had all worked on the script at various stages. Directors such as John Woo and Zack Snyder had previously been attached to direct.

In July 2017, Paramount Pictures announced plans to make a film adaptation of the novel with Akiva Goldsman as producer, and a new draft penned by Josh Appelbaum & André Nemec. Ryan Reynolds was reported to be in early talks to play John Clark. In September 2018, Michael B. Jordan was announced to be playing John Clark in a two-part film series, with Rainbow Six as the intended sequel to Without Remorse. In January 2023, the Rainbow Six film was confirmed to be directed by Chad Stahelski, with Michael B. Jordan reprising his role as Clark, and writers Daniel Fajemisin-Duncan and Marlon Smith tapped to write the screenplay. Stahelski then switched to his next project Ballerina which was released in the United States on June 6, 2025, after being delayed a year from its originally announced date of June 7, 2024.

== Release details ==
- 1998, U.S., G. P. Putnam's Sons ISBN 0-399-14390-4, Pub date August 3, 1998, hardcover
- 1998, U.K., Michael Joseph Ltd ISBN 0-7181-4336-1, Pub date August 27, 1998, hardback
- 1998, U.S., Putnam Publishing Group ISBN 0-399-14413-7, Pub date August 1998, hardcover (Limited Edition)
- 1998, U.S., Demco Media ISBN 0-606-17207-6, Pub date September 1998, unbound
- 1998, U.S., Random House ISBN 0-375-70324-1, Pub date August 1998, paperback (Large Type Edition)
- 1999, U.S., Berkley Publishing Group ISBN 0-425-17005-5, Pub date September 1999, paperback
- 1999, U.S., Berkley Publishing Group ISBN 0-425-17034-9, Pub date September 1999, mass market paperback
