= Locked On (novel) =

2011 thriller novel by Tom Clancy

- Author: Tom Clancy with Mark Greaney
- Audio read by: Lou Diamond Phillips
- Language: English
- Series: The Campus; Jack Ryan
- Release number: 11
- Genre: Spy fiction; Techno-thriller; Military fiction
- Publisher: G.P. Putnam's Sons
- Publication date: December 13, 2011
- Publication place: United States
- Media type: Print (Hardcover, Paperback), Audio, eBook
- Pages: 864
- ISBN: 9780399157318
- Preceded by: Dead or Alive
- Followed by: Threat Vector

Locked On is a techno-thriller novel written by Tom Clancy and Mark Greaney released on December 13, 2011. A direct sequel to Dead or Alive (2010), it is Clancy's first of three collaborations with Greaney and features Jack Ryan Jr. and The Campus as they try to avert a nuclear threat from a rogue Pakistani general, as well as his father Jack Ryan Sr. in his presidential campaign. The book debuted at number two on the New York Times bestseller list.

== Plot ==
A year after the Emir's capture, The Campus investigates Pakistani intelligence official and brigadier general Riaz Rehan. Unbeknownst to them, Rehan plots to bring his country and India to nuclear war by orchestrating terrorist attacks behind the scenes on behalf of terror groups allegedly backed by the Pakistani government, aiming to create an Islamic caliphate in its aftermath. For the final step of his operation, he steals two nuclear weapons from the Pakistani military armory and then secretly gives them to Dagestani terrorist organization Jamaat Shariat, who would then use them to attack Moscow using space delivery rockets.

Meanwhile, former president Jack Ryan is in the middle of his presidential campaign and ahead in the polls. Even though his opponent and successor Ed Kealty publicly reveals the capture of the Emir in their second presidential debate in a desperate attempt to win voters, Ryan opposes his plan to a public trial for the terrorist. The resulting turnaround in public opinion enrages Czech billionaire and Kealty supporter Paul Laska, later launching a vendetta to discredit Ryan six weeks before the presidential election.

Laska's progressive organization provides the Emir with a legal defense team. After CIA deputy director Charles Sumner Alden identifies Campus operatives John Clark and Domingo "Ding" Chavez from the Emir's rough sketches of the men who captured him, Laska enlists the help of SVR officer Valentin Kovalenko for collecting information about the former's CIA activities. Kovalenko uncovers Clark's unauthorized assassination of an East German Stasi operative in Berlin in 1981, which is not part of the full presidential pardon Ryan had signed for his friend and making him accountable for murder. Laska covertly gives the dossier to Kealty, who then orders the FBI to hunt down Clark.

Campus operative Sam Driscoll goes to Miranshah, Pakistan to investigate a lead on Rehan regarding his connection with the Haqqani terror network. However, he was captured by Rehan's men in an attack on his safehouse, while his asset, ISI official Mohammed al Darkur, barely escapes. Sam was later kept by Haqqani forces in a North Waziristan prison. Meanwhile, Chavez and his colleagues Dominic "Dom" Caruso and Jack Ryan Jr. surveil Rehan's safe house in Abu Dhabi and later rescue al Darkur from Rehan's men; the Pakistani general barely escapes. They find out that Sam had been captured, and after al Darkur later pinpoints Sam's whereabouts, Chavez, Caruso, and Jack, along with the ISI major and his trusted Zarrar battalion commandos, storm the Haqqani prison and free Sam.

Meanwhile, Clark goes on the run and travels to Europe in order to find out the source of the information on the Berlin hit. It was revealed that he had been personally tasked by his friend and CIA station chief of Berlin with giving money to extorting Stasi officers who had caught him in a honey trap; when it became apparent that the Stasi officers wanted more than their fair share, Clark kills one of them while escaping from the botched swap. As soon as Clark finds out about Kovalenko and Laska in Moscow, he gets captured by French investigators hired as cutouts by Laska. After the Frenchmen fail to get information from Clark, Laska blackmails Kovalenko into torturing him for information about his current employer.

In Kazakhstan, Jamaat Shariat forces led by the head of a Russian space company allied with them hijack the Baikonur Cosmodrome, threatening to launch the nuclear-tipped missiles and send them into Moscow unless their imprisoned commander has been freed from military custody. When Russian special forces and later Rainbow fail to retake the facility, the desperate Russian government decides to assign Clark as the temporary head of Rainbow in order to resolve the crisis. The FSB then frees Clark from Kovalenko, who is arrested. The former then contacts Chavez to take part in the operation, which becomes successful. However, they find out that the hijackers had been fooled by Rehan into using only one nuclear weapon and that the Pakistani had switched out the other bomb at the last minute, intent on using it himself to attack India. Meanwhile, the CIA tracks down Rehan to war-torn Lahore; Jack, Caruso, and al Darkur are immediately deployed there. When they find out about the missing nuke, Jack later dispatches Rehan after a lengthy chase across the train tracks, while Caruso and al Darkur defuse the bomb.

Ryan wins the presidential election with a narrow percentage of the popular vote. Alden was later arrested, and the Emir was sent to Guantanamo Bay. However, Jack Junior's girlfriend Melanie, a CIA intelligence officer, is revealed to be a spy planted by Alden to find out his affiliation with Clark and The Campus.

== Reception ==
=== Commercial ===
The book debuted at number two on the New York Times bestseller list, making it the first Clancy novel not to chart at number one. It also debuted at number nine on the USA Today's Best-selling Books list.

=== Critical ===
The novel received positive reviews. Chicago Tribune praised the book, saying that "Ultimately, it's Clancy's gift for taking three novels' worth of plotting and knitting it into a single continuous and compelling story that makes this new offering so successful." The Pittsburgh Post-Gazette gave it a mixed review, noting the implausibility of the plot but concluding that "the action is nearly nonstop and only occasionally wildly improbable; the description of weapons and tactics employed by protagonists and antagonists is accurate and comprehensive, and is inserted smoothly into the narrative."
