= Without Remorse =

1993 thriller novel by Tom Clancy

- First edition
- Author: Tom Clancy
- Language: English
- Series: John Clark
- Release number: 1
- Genre: Crime fiction; Military fiction; Historical fiction; Techno-thriller
- Publisher: G.P. Putnam's Sons
- Publication date: August 11, 1993
- Publication place: United States
- Media type: Print (Hardcover, Paperback)
- Pages: 639
- ISBN: 0399138250
- Followed by: Rainbow Six

Without Remorse is a thriller novel, written by Tom Clancy and published on August 11, 1993. Set during the Vietnam War, it serves as the origin story for John Clark, one of the recurring characters in Clancy's Ryanverse. Without Remorse introduces Clark as former Navy SEAL John Kelly, as he wages a one-man war against drug dealers in Baltimore while also executing a raid at a prisoner of war camp in North Vietnam. The book debuted at number one on The New York Times Best Seller list.

== Plot ==
In 1970, former Navy SEAL John Kelly picks up a hitchhiker named Pam on his way home near the Chesapeake Bay. They become lovers, and over time Kelly discovers that Pam is a drug mule and prostitute who had recently escaped from her pimp Henry Tucker. With the help of husband-and-wife doctors Sam and Sarah Rosen, Pam starts to recover. Weeks later, Kelly and Pam go to Baltimore for a follow-up, where she is recognized and pursued by one of Henry's men. Kelly is gravely wounded while Pam is recaptured and later tortured, gang-raped and killed.

In North Vietnam, a U.S. target drone discovers Air Force Colonel Robin Zacharias as a prisoner of war in a secret camp administered by the NVA. Since Zacharias possesses highly classified knowledge and has been declared killed in action, Admiral Dutch Maxwell arranges a secret rescue mission for him and other American POWs in the camp. Unbeknownst to them, Soviet colonel Nikolay Grishanov has been interrogating the prisoners and lobbies his government to transport Zacharias and his fellow prisoners into the Soviet Union, citing their intelligence value.

Kelly recovers from his wounds with the help of Dr. Rosen and his head nurse, Sandra "Sandy" O'Toole. He wages a private war on Tucker's drug ring by killing some of its players. Kelly asks the Rosens and O'Toole to help rehabilitate one of the rescued prostitutes, Doris Brown, and obtains more information on the drug ring from brutally torturing one of Pam's pimps, William "Billy" Grayson, using a pressure chamber designed to simulate deep-water diving conditions; Billy is left to die from severe decompression sickness. The murders draw the attention of detective Emmet Ryan, who had investigated Kelly's initial altercation and Pam's subsequent death.

Kelly is recruited by Admiral Maxwell as a pathfinder for the rescue mission on Zacharias and other American POWs, since he had previously gone behind enemy lines to rescue Maxwell's son. However, an American mole informs the Soviets of the rescue mission, leading to the NVA moving the prisoners to a different location. Nevertheless, Kelly manages to capture Grishanov while he escapes from the camp. The Soviet colonel is then used as leverage to negotiate the transfer of Colonel Zacharias and his fellow prisoners to the Hanoi Hilton.

Returning from Vietnam, Kelly discovers that Doris and her father Raymond have been murdered and continues his mission. He also finds out that the heroin processed by Tucker's drug ring was smuggled into the U.S. through the corpses of American soldiers. Meanwhile, the CIA try to recruit him following his actions in Vietnam, but due to Kelly's difficult position, they agree to help him escape his legal troubles in return for the assassination of the mole who had jeopardized the Vietnam operation. Kelly forces the supposed mole, an aide to the Special Assistant to the National Security Advisor named Walter "Wally" Hicks, to kill himself, inadvertently leaving the real mole, a Senate aide and anti-war activist named Peter Henderson, in place. Kelly then rushes to complete his vendetta by killing Tucker, his partner Tony Piaggi, and corrupt police lieutenant Mark Charon.

Ryan finds out that Kelly is the vigilante targeting drug dealers and his colleague Charon. He confronts him on his boat, where Kelly bargains for an hour's head start before he arrests him. Ryan agrees, and Kelly fakes his death by capsizing his boat near a cargo ship at the Chesapeake Bay. He is then extracted by his CIA superiors, who officially recruit him under his new identity as John Clark. Kelly quietly resumes contact with O'Toole and marries her. Three years later, Zacharias and his fellow POWs are released after the end of the American involvement in the Vietnam War.

== Characters ==
=== Baltimore ===
- John Terrence Kelly: Former Navy SEAL, later a full-time operative for the Central Intelligence Agency under the name John Clark.
- Pamela "Pam" Madden: Kelly's lover. Drug mule and prostitute who escaped from Henry Tucker
- Dr Sam Rosen: Professor of neurosurgery at Johns Hopkins University, Dr. Sarah Rosen's husband.
- Dr Sarah Rosen: Pharmacologist and professor at Johns Hopkins University, Dr. Sam Rosen's wife.
- Sandra "Sandy" O'Toole: a Vietnam war widow and nurse-practitioner at Johns Hopkins Hospital.
- Henry Tucker: Pimp and leader of the Baltimore drug ring. He is possibly inspired by Frank Lucas. Tucker, like the real-life Lucas, is an African American drug lord who is smuggling heroin into the United States using military transport planes.
- William "Billy" Grayson: Drug dealer working for Tucker.
- Tony Piaggi: A drug dealer, member of the Baltimore Mafia, and a major distributor of Tucker's heroin.
- Doris Brown: Pam's fellow drug mule and prostitute.
- Pierre Lamarck: Pam’s first pimp based in New Orleans.
- Lt Emmet Ryan: Lieutenant at the Baltimore Police Department (Homicide Division) and Jack Ryan's father. Jack himself also appears briefly to announce his decision to join the Marines to his parents.
- Lt Mark Charon: Lieutenant at the Baltimore City Police Department (Narcotics Division), on Tucker's payroll
- Manuel "Portagee" Oreza: Quartermaster First Class for the United States Coast Guard, Kelly's friend. Pursued Kelly when he faked his death, believes him to be dead.

=== Vietnam ===
- Colonel Robin Zacharias: fighter-bomber pilot for the United States Air Force who helped in the formulation of the Strategic Air Command war plans. Shot down and captured by the North Vietnamese Army during a Wild Weasel attack on their SAM sites.
- Colonel Nikolay Yevgeniyevich "Kolya" Grishanov: The sole interrogator at the POW camp holding Zacharias.
- Vice Admiral Winslow Holland "Dutch" Maxwell: Assistant chief of naval operations (Air) for the United States Navy. Formed the rescue mission (codename "Boxwood Green") and personally recruited Kelly to take part in the operation.
- Rear Admiral Casimir Podulski: Aide to Vice Admiral Maxwell. Involved in the planning and execution of Boxwood Green
- Admiral James Greer: Rear admiral for the U.S. Navy who started working for the CIA. Supervised Boxwood Green and later recruits Kelly into the agency.
- Robert Ritter: Senior executive in the Operations Division of the CIA. Supervised Boxwood Green and also recruits Kelly into the agency.
- Walter "Wally" Hicks: Aide to the Special Assistant to the National Security Advisor. Misidentified as the KGB mole by Ritter and was killed by Kelly under the pretense of a heroin overdose.
- Peter Henderson: Minor Senate aide, revealed to be a KGB mole (codename "Cassius") that burned Boxwood Green. Appeared in several Ryanverse novels.

== Themes ==
Without Remorse is said to be inspired by David Morrell's novel First Blood (1972) as well a string of action films that feature violent and "psycho" Vietnam veterans of the 1980s. Clancy subverted the cliché by framing Kelly's rage and frustration as "pro-social". Moreover, it gave him a platform to express his disgust with the U.S. government for neglecting Vietnam veterans, who "understand the arts of war".

Regarding the message of the novel, Clancy said: "The central question in this book is: What is justice? And how is justice applied? What if you're in the situation where a great wrong has been done and the law does not respond to it? Now, is your duty as a citizen just to forget about it and permit society as a whole to make that mistake? Or is your duty as a citizen to become the instrument of justice, if you can do so in a controlled and structured and just way? Do you have the moral right to become the instrument of justice yourself?"

== Development ==
Clancy started working on Without Remorse in 1971. He later went back to the previously abandoned story in 1992, spending about four months on the novel. He explained the process: "You gotta tell a good story if people are going to read it. I think you have an ethical obligation to deal with those issues as truthfully as possible. So, there's an educational aspect to what I do."

In 1992, Putnam paid $14 million for the North American rights, a record for a single book.

== Reception ==
=== Commercial ===
The book debuted at number one on the New York Times bestseller list for the week of August 29, 1993. In addition, it debuted at number 20 on the USA Today's Best-selling Books list for the week of October 28, 1993, and later peaked at number two.

=== Critical ===
Without Remorse received generally positive reviews. Dallas Morning News hailed it as "Mr. Clancy's best", while the San Diego Union-Tribune praised it as "a non-stop emotional roller coaster". However, Kirkus Reviews gave it a mixed verdict, stating that it is "twice as long as the two rather creaky storylines can bear, but the millions of midlevel, desk-bound, action-loving bureaucrats whose adventurous wishes Clancy so faithfully fulfills are unlikely to complain." Publishers Weekly also gave it a mixed review, bemoaning Clancy's "attempts to rationalize this amoral crusade with passages of introspection by characters who are either noble warriors or human scum" as well as "failings of style and moral judgment"; however, they agree that "this overlong, often melodramatic novel seems destined to follow its predecessors to the top of the bestseller lists."

== Film adaptation ==
Savoy Pictures first bought the film rights to Without Remorse soon after the novel was released for $2.5 million. At one point, Keanu Reeves was offered the role as Clark for $7 million but declined. Variety magazine reported that Laurence Fishburne and Gary Sinise were later attached to star in the adaptation, but production was shut down due to script problems and financial woes with the production company.

The film went under development hell for years until Christopher McQuarrie signed on with Paramount Pictures to direct the adaptation in 2012. Tom Hardy was approached by Paramount to play Clark, and Kevin Costner was slated to reprise his role as mentor William Harper from another Clancy-based film, Jack Ryan: Shadow Recruit (2014), but this version was scrapped.

In 2017, Akiva Goldsman signed on with the same studio to produce another film adaptation starring Clark, Rainbow Six. Michael B. Jordan was brought to play the character in a two-part film series, composed of Without Remorse and Rainbow Six and with Goldsman, Jordan, Josh Appelbaum, and Andre Nemec producing. Stefano Sollima was hired to direct the film. Taylor Sheridan was later brought to rewrite the screenplay. Tom Clancy's Without Remorse was released on Prime Video on April 30, 2021.
