= Without Remorse (film) =

2021 film by Stefano Sollima

- Promotional release poster
- Directed by: Stefano Sollima
- Written by: Taylor Sheridan; Will Staples
- Based on: Without Remorse by Tom Clancy
- Produced by: Akiva Goldsman; Josh Appelbaum; André Nemec; Michael B. Jordan
- Starring: Michael B. Jordan; Jamie Bell; Jodie Turner-Smith; Jacob Scipio; Jack Kesy; Guy Pearce; Lauren London
- Cinematography: Philippe Rousselot
- Edited by: Matthew Newman
- Music by: Jónsi
- Production companies: Paramount Pictures; Skydance; Weed Road Pictures; New Republic Pictures; The Saw Mill; Outlier Society
- Distributed by: Amazon Studios
- Release date: April 30, 2021
- Running time: 109 minutes
- Country: United States
- Language: English

Without Remorse, also known as Tom Clancy's Without Remorse, is a 2021 American action thriller film directed by Stefano Sollima and written by Taylor Sheridan and Will Staples. It is based on the 1993 novel of the same name by Tom Clancy. The film stars Michael B. Jordan, Jamie Bell, Jodie Turner-Smith, Luke Mitchell, Jack Kesy, Brett Gelman, Lauren London, Colman Domingo and Guy Pearce. In the film, John Kelly, a U.S. Navy SEAL, seeks revenge after his wife and unit members are killed by Russian hitmen.

The film had been in development since the novel was published in 1993, with various actors, including Keanu Reeves and Tom Hardy, approached for the role of John Kelly. After over 20 years in development hell, Jordan was announced as the lead role in September 2018, and Sheridan was hired to rewrite a script originally written in the 1990s. Filming began in Berlin in October 2019 and completed production in October 2020.

Without Remorse was originally produced and set for a theatrical release by Paramount Pictures, but was delayed and then acquired by Amazon Studios, who digitally released it on Prime Video on April 30, 2021. The film received mixed reviews from critics with praise for Jordan's performance, action sequences and technical aspects, but called the film generic.

== Plot ==
In Aleppo, Syria, a team of US Navy SEALs, including Senior Chief Petty Officer John Kelly, rescue a CIA operative taken hostage by a suspected pro-Assad para-military group. The situation escalates as the SEALs discover that the captors are actually Russian military. Three months later, in apparent retaliation for their role in the mission, two members of the team are covertly killed by Russian FSB operatives. Kelly's pregnant wife Pam is murdered when the Russians break into their house. Kelly kills three, all except one of the attackers, before being rushed to the hospital with near-fatal wounds.

In Washington, D.C., Lt. Commander Karen Greer, Kelly's SEAL team leader and friend, meets with Ritter and Secretary of Defense Thomas Clay to discuss how the FSB discovered the SEALs' identities and review their response options. Leaked news of Russia's unprecedented attack on American soil has caused the already-strained relationship between the two nations to sour further, possibly causing a new cold war. The CIA refuses to conduct an investigation into the murders, motivating Greer to pass confidential information to Kelly. Healed from his injuries, Kelly tracks down the corrupt Russian diplomat, who issued the passports to the FSB operatives, and forces him to give the name of the surviving assassin before killing him. Incarcerated for murder, Kelly bargains his way out by revealing the escaped operative is Victor Rykov, an ex-Spetznaz officer, who is hiding in Murmansk, Russia.

Despite Greer's objections, Clay allows Kelly to participate in Rykov's capture on the condition that Kelly serves his sentence after the mission. Kelly flies to Murmansk with Greer and a CIA black ops team, planning to HALO jump into Russia. Intercepted and attacked by a Russian fighter, their modified Airbus A320 crashes into the Barents Sea. Kelly dives into the wreckage to recover essential equipment, including a zodiac boat. The team arrives in Murmansk and finds Ritter, whom Kelly suspects is to blame for the intelligence leaks. Ritter swears that he is not responsible and leads the team to Rykov. Kelly goes off mission to confront Rykov, finding him wearing a suicide vest and learns that he is a deep cover CIA asset. Rykov detonates his vest, killing himself as the team becomes pinned down by sniper fire. As police arrive, the team realizes that the mission was a set-up to have American soldiers killed on Russian soil to start a war.

Kelly volunteers to cover the team's escape so that his death could be plausibly denied as he is a convict. Kelly buys the team time to reach safety, but is badly injured. Kelly uses an explosion as cover to steal a Russian military police uniform and hijacks an ambulance to escape. Kelly and the surviving team members leave the country by boat. Ritter officially reports Kelly as dead, allowing Kelly to hunt for the traitor.

Back in D.C., Kelly confronts Clay and forces him into his car. After Kelly threatens Clay's family, Clay confesses to being behind the intelligence leaks and orchestrating the conflict between the U.S. and Russia, intending to start a war with Russia to boost the economy and unite the American people against a common enemy. Kelly drives the car over a bridge and lets it sink to the bottom of the Potomac River, drowning Clay. Kelly escapes with a recording of the confession, with the help of Greer, who was waiting in the river with diving gear. At Washington Union Station, Greer gives Kelly a new identity provided by Ritter, where Kelly leaves to begin his new life as "John Clark".

A year later, Clark meets with Ritter, newly promoted to director, and proposes to create a multinational counter-terrorism team: Rainbow. (Note: i.e. the team from Rainbow Six.)

== Cast ==
- Michael B. Jordan as John Kelly
- Jamie Bell as Robert Ritter
- Jodie Turner-Smith as Lt. Commander Karen Greer
- Lauren London as Pam Kelly
- Brett Gelman as Victor Rykov
- Jacob Scipio as Hatchet
- Jack Kesy as Thunder
- Colman Domingo as Pastor West
- Guy Pearce as Secretary Clay
- Todd Lasance as Dallas
- Cam Gigandet as Keith Webb
- Luke Mitchell as Rowdy King
- Merab Ninidze as Andre Vaseliev
- George Asprey as Denis Stewart

== Production ==
Savoy Pictures first bought the film rights to Without Remorse soon after the novel was released, for $2.5 million. At one point, Keanu Reeves was offered the role as John Kelly for $7 million but declined. Although the film failed to meet its expected December 1995 release date, it was fast tracked after John Milius joined the production with the intent to write and direct the film, working in close consultation with the original book's author Tom Clancy. Variety magazine reported that Laurence Fishburne and Gary Sinise were later attached to star in the adaptation; however, production was shut down for script problems and financial woes with the production company. The film went under development hell for years until Christopher McQuarrie signed on with Paramount Pictures to direct the adaptation in 2012. Tom Hardy was approached by Paramount to play Kelly, and Kevin Costner was slated to reprise his role as mentor William Harper from another Clancy-based film, Jack Ryan: Shadow Recruit (2014), but this version did not happen.

In 2017, it was announced that Akiva Goldsman signed on with the same studio to produce another film adaptation starring Clark, Rainbow Six. On September 20, 2018, Michael B. Jordan was announced to be playing the character in a two-part film series, which will be composed of Without Remorse and Rainbow Six and produced by Goldsman, Jordan, Josh Appelbaum, and Andre Nemec. In December 2018, Stefano Sollima was hired to direct the film. On January 9, 2019, Variety announced that Taylor Sheridan would rewrite the screenplay.

In September 2019, Jamie Bell and Jodie Turner-Smith were cast, with Luke Mitchell, Jacob Scipio, Cam Gigandet, Jack Kesy, Todd Lasance and Brett Gelman joining in October.

Filming began in Berlin on October 25, 2019. Some filming was scheduled to begin on December 19 near Dupont Circle in Washington, D.C. The film possibly completed filming in Los Angeles on October 19, 2020.

Jónsi composed the film score. Paramount Music has released the soundtrack, coinciding with the film's release.

== Release ==
Without Remorse was originally scheduled to be released on September 18, 2020, by Paramount Pictures, but due to the COVID-19 pandemic, it was delayed to October 2, 2020, and again to February 26, 2021. In July 2020, Amazon Studios entered talks to acquire the distribution rights to the film and release it digitally on Amazon Prime Video. Paramount officially took the film off its theatrical release calendar in November 2020. The film was teased in Amazon's commercial featuring Alexa and Jordan made for Super Bowl LV.

The film was released on Prime Video on April 30, 2021. According to Samba TV, the film was watched in 4.8 million households in its first 30 days of release.

== Reception ==
On Rotten Tomatoes, the film has a 45% approval rating based on 191 reviews, with an average score of 5.3/10. The website's critics consensus reads: "Despite a commanding performance from Michael B. Jordan, Without Remorse fails to escape its outdated patriotic tropes and forced franchise place settings." Metacritic assigned the film a weighted average score of 41 out of 100, based on 41 critics, indicating "mixed or average reviews".

The Hollywood Reporter's David Rooney called the film "pacey and punchy, buoyed by its magnetic lead" and wrote: "The result is a solid entry in the Clancy screen canon — gritty, briskly paced, laced with vigorously choreographed fight scenes, explosive weapons action and twisty political intrigue that seems prescient as it taps into the most strained period in U.S.-Russian relations since the Cold War."

Randy Meyers of The Mercury News wrote, "Without Remorse improves on its source material and delivers a satisfyingly sleek and ultra-violent spy thriller." Owen Gleiberman of Variety called the film "...a lively formulaic action-hero origin story, dunked in combat grunge, that demonstrates how a resourceful lead actor can bend and heighten the meaning of a commercial thriller."

Barry Hertz of The Globe and Mail wrote, "Without Remorse is a half-hearted attempt to exfiltrate an espionage brand that just won't come in from the cold. If you like your shootouts generic, your characters disposable, and your plot twists as predictable as airport newsstand merchandise, then have I got the far-from-impossible mission for you." David Ehrlich of IndieWire gave the film a grade of C− and said: "Without Remorse doesn't understand the role it's meant to serve as the foundation of a potential franchise. It's a movie locked in a tedious custody battle between legacy and potential, too safe to whet appetites for what's to come while also too sequel-oriented to stand on its own two legs."

Anupama Chopra of Film Companion wrote, "The action is fierce and relentless. The body count is high. But it isn't seductive."

== Sequel ==
In September 2018, Jordan's selection to play Kelly was reported to serve as an origin story for the character before he would appear in a sequel, based on Clancy's Rainbow Six novel.

In January 2023, the film adaptation was officially greenlit and entered development. Chad Stahelski will serve as director, with Jordan reprising his role from the previous movie, with the plot centering around Jordan's character commanding a multi-country anti-terrorist squad, against an international conspiracy. Additionally Jordan is a producer, alongside Akiva Goldsman, Greg Lessans, Josh Appelbaum, André Nemec, and Elizabeth Raposo. The project will be distributed by Paramount with the studio developing Rainbow Six for theatrical release. The film will also be a joint-venture production between Paramount, Outlier Society, Weed Road Pictures, The Saw Mill Productions, and 87Eleven Entertainment. Principal photography is expected to commence as Stahelski's next project, following the release of John Wick: Chapter 4 (2023). Stahelski then switched to his next project Ballerina which was released in the United States on June 6, 2025, after being delayed a year from its originally announced date of June 7, 2024.
