= The Sum of All Fears (video game) =

2002 video game

- Developers: Red Storm Entertainment; Ubi Soft Milan (GBA)
- Publisher: Ubi Soft
- Producer: Deke Waters
- Composer: Bill Brown
- Platforms: Microsoft Windows, Game Boy Advance, PlayStation 2, GameCube
- Release: Microsoft Windows: NA: May 28, 2002; EU: August 9, 2002; Game Boy Advance: EU: October 4, 2002; NA: November 19, 2002; PlayStation 2: EU: November 8, 2002; GameCube: NA: December 17, 2002; EU: March 21, 2003
- Genre: Tactical shooter
- Modes: Single-player, multiplayer

The Sum of All Fears (known as Tom Clancy's The Sum of All Fears) is a 2002 tactical shooter video game which is developed by Red Storm Entertainment and published by Ubi Soft. It was released for Microsoft Windows, PlayStation 2 (only released in Europe) and GameCube, based on the Ghost Recon game engine; another version was released for the Game Boy Advance.

The game is based on the 2002 film of the same name. It is a tactical first-person shooter game and is very similar in style to that of the Rainbow Six series of games.

== Plot ==
A screenshot showing the PC version of the game.

The game's first two missions take place sometime during the film, in which the FBI Hostage Rescue Team (HRT) works to save hostages in a Charleston, West Virginia television station, and shut down operations from a West Virginian militia calling themselves the "Mountain Men". From the third mission on, John Clark recruits the team to work for the CIA and has the operatives work on seeking out and killing the conspirators behind an incident in Baltimore, Maryland, in which a nuclear bomb has been detonated during an American football game, killing a large number of people.

== Gameplay ==
The Sum of All Fears uses a simplified way of gameplay from the Rainbow Six series. There is no planning phase for missions; instead the player's three-man team executes a pre-planned insertion with other anti-terrorist teams controlled solely by the computer. However, the player is free to deviate from the planned route and select their own path. The player also cannot individually select the equipment each team member carries. Instead, the player chooses from a small selection of pre-defined equipment packages for the entire team. On each mission, the player has control of their two teammates, and can take direct control of either of them at any time. The player can also give a few rudimentary commands to the teammates, such as "wait here", "follow me", and "clear/grenade/flashbang the next room".

== Reception ==
Reception

Aggregate scores
Aggregator	Score			
Aggregator	GBA	GameCube	PC	PS2
GameRankings	68%	36%	72%	53%
Metacritic	69/100	36/100	72/100	N/A

Review scores
Publication	Score			
Publication	GBA	GameCube	PC	PS2
Electronic Gaming Monthly	N/A	5.5/10	N/A	N/A
Eurogamer	N/A	N/A	6/10	N/A
Game Informer	N/A	5.5/10	7.5/10	N/A
GamePro	N/A	2/5	N/A	N/A
GameRevolution	N/A	N/A	C−	N/A
GameSpot	6.7/10	2.6/10	7.2/10	N/A
GameSpy	N/A	1/5	3/5	N/A
GameZone	8.3/10	N/A	8.3/10	N/A
IGN	6/10	2.5/10	8.7/10	N/A
Nintendo Power	4.1/5	3.1/5	N/A	N/A
PC Gamer (US)	N/A	N/A	72%	N/A

The Sum of All Fears sold 180,000 copies by September 30, 2002. By the end of 2002, its sales had surpassed 400,000 copies, although Ubisoft had projected sales of only 350,000 by March 2003.

The PC and Game Boy Advance versions received "average" reviews, while the GameCube version received "unfavorable" reviews according to video game review aggregator Metacritic.
