= Clear and Present Danger =

1989 novel by Tom Clancy

- First edition
- Author: Tom Clancy
- Language: English
- Series: Jack Ryan
- Release number: 4
- Genre: Political thriller; Techno-thriller; Military fiction
- Publisher: G. P. Putnam's Sons
- Publication date: August 17, 1989
- Publication place: United States
- Media type: Print (hardcover and paperback)
- Pages: 688
- ISBN: 0399134409
- Preceded by: The Cardinal of the Kremlin
- Followed by: The Sum of All Fears

Clear and Present Danger is a political thriller novel, written by Tom Clancy and published on August 17, 1989. A sequel to The Cardinal of the Kremlin (1988), character Jack Ryan becomes acting deputy director of Intelligence at the Central Intelligence Agency (CIA) and discovers that he is being kept in the dark by his colleagues who are conducting a covert war against a drug cartel based in Colombia. It debuted at number one on The New York Times Best Seller list. A film adaptation, featuring Harrison Ford reprising his role as Ryan, was released on August 3, 1994.

== Plot summary ==
The President of the United States is running for reelection. His fierce opponent, Ohio Governor J. Robert Fowler, has rallied the American public behind the current administration's failures in the war on drugs. National Security Advisor James Cutter seizes an opportunity to help the president initiate covert operations within Colombia with the intent to disrupt the illegal drug trade there. Aided by CIA Deputy Director (Operations) Robert Ritter and CIA director Arthur Moore, the plan involves inserting light infantry troops of Hispanic descent (divided into four 11 man teams, codenamed BANNER, KNIFE, OMEN and FEATURE) into the country to stake out airstrips used by the cartel (SHOWBOAT), which then allows F-15 Eagles to intercept drug flights (EAGLE EYE). In addition, mobile phone communications between cartel management are intercepted through CAPER, which is also the communications arm for SHOWBOAT.

Meanwhile, a United States Coast Guard Cutter intercepts a yacht in the Caribbean Sea; two Hispanic men are found cleaning the vessel after murdering its owner and his family. When a senior crewman says the murderers could escape justice by claiming they found the ship after the murders took place, the Coast Guard captain orders a mock trial and execution, and the killers are forced to confess their crimes; it is later learned that the murdered owner was a businessman involved in a money laundering scheme for a Colombian drug cartel. The Federal Bureau of Investigation (FBI) seizes laundered money and other assets from several U.S. and European banks totaling over $650 million.

The seizure of the cartel money by the FBI infuriates drug cartel leader Ernesto Escobedo, who ordered the hit on the American businessman. Meanwhile, his intelligence officer, Felix Cortez, starts dating Moira Wolfe, the secretary of FBI director Emil Jacobs and finds out about Jacobs's official visit to the Attorney General of Colombia. Escobedo orders the assassination of Jacobs without informing Cortez. Upon arriving in the city of Bogotá, the FBI director's motorcade is ambushed, killing him as well as the head of the Drug Enforcement Administration and the U.S. ambassador to Colombia. Moira is horrified by the events and later attempts suicide, but survives. Enraged, the President authorizes Operation RECIPROCITY, stepping up Cutter's operations and declaring war on Escobedo's drug organization.

Later, a surgical airstrike on a drug kingpin's mansion during a meeting of several cartel members kills everyone inside. Escobedo did not attend the meeting and sent Cortez to represent him; Cortez was delayed and witnessed the explosion as a result. Cortez later deduces that the Americans have been conducting operations against the Colombian drug cartel, but plays along, planning to engineer a war within the cartel that will leave him in a position to seize power. He dispatches cartel men to hunt down the American troops, and later blackmails Cutter in a secret meeting into shutting down all covert operations against the cartel in exchange for reducing drug exports to the United States. The point man for team BANNER, not paying attention due to suffering from food poisoning, accidentally blunders the team into an encampment of cartel men, which results in a firefight that kills half of them, with the survivors later meeting up with team KNIFE.

Meanwhile, Jack Ryan, former Marine and acting CIA Deputy Director (Intelligence) after his boss, Admiral James Greer, was hospitalized for pancreatic cancer, suspects the Agency's involvement in the situation in Colombia. His position enables him to be aware of most operations, but he realizes he is being kept out of the loop on what is happening in South America. After his friend, fighter pilot Robby Jackson, makes an inquiry into activity in the region, Ryan becomes determined to find out what is going on. He learns about the covert operations by breaking into Ritter's files. Outraged, he seeks help from the FBI and later meets John Clark, a CIA field operative and former Navy SEAL coordinating CAPER. The cartel men surround and attack team KNIFE and the survivors of BANNER, killing most of them, leaving just Staff Sergeant Domingo "Ding" Chavez and a few other escaping survivors, while suffering heavy casualties of their own.

Having been previously ordered by the President to shut down all covert operations against the cartel to avoid the political fallout, Cutter does so after his secret meeting with Cortez. He secretly provides Cortez with the coordinates of the American troops in Colombia for him to hunt down. Their meeting having been shadowed by the FBI, Ryan and Clark are outraged. They team up to rescue American troops left behind in Colombia, using a U.S. Air Force special operations helicopter. This results in their missing Greer's funeral, which raises the suspicions of Moore and Ritter. Although the rescue team suffers casualties from the cartel men hunting the American soldiers in Colombia, they successfully extract the survivors, including Chavez. Later, the team captures Cortez and Escobedo in a raid on the cartel's command post. They then fly out to sea, where they safely land on the cutter Panache.

After being confronted by Clark with evidence of his treason, Cutter commits suicide by running in front of an oncoming bus. Ryan confronts the defiant President for not informing him about the covert operations in Colombia and nearly starting a war. After he briefs the heads of the Special Intelligence Committee, the President deliberately loses the election to Fowler in order to hide the operations and protect the honor of those involved.

Escobedo is turned over to his fellow cartel chieftains, who will likely execute him. Cortez is later returned to Cuba, where he has been branded as a traitor by his former DGI colleagues. Meanwhile, Clark takes Chavez under his wing and recruits him into the CIA.

== Characters ==
=== United States ===
- The President (unnamed)
- Vice Admiral James A. Cutter Jr.: Assistant to the President for National Security Affairs
- Judge Arthur Moore: Director of Central Intelligence
- Vice Admiral James Greer: Deputy Director (Intelligence)
- Jack Ryan: Acting CIA Deputy Director (Intelligence)
- Robert Ritter: CIA Deputy Director (Operations)
- Emil Jacobs: Director of the Federal Bureau of Investigation
- Dan Murray: Deputy assistant director of the Federal Bureau of Investigation
- Moira Wolfe: Executive secretary to FBI Director Jacobs. Seduced by Cortez in order to obtain information about his boss and the FBI, especially his secret trip to the Attorney General of Colombia.
- Mark Bright: Assistant special agent in charge (ASAC) of the FBI office in Mobile, Alabama. Assigned to the Pirates Case involving the two Hispanic men who killed the American businessman and his family in a yacht in the Caribbean Sea.
- Red Wegener: Commanding officer of the United States Coast Guard cutter Panache, nicknamed "the King of SAR (Search and Rescue)"
- Robby Jackson: Naval aviator serving aboard USS Ranger
- Jonathan Robert Fowler: Governor of Ohio and the President's main opponent in the presidential elections, which he later wins

=== Colombia ===
- John Clark: CIA operations officer
- Felix Cortez: Chief security and intelligence officer for Escobedo, a former colonel in the Cuban intelligence service (DGI)
- Ernesto Escobedo: One of the leaders of the Medellín drug cartel
- Domingo "Ding" Chavez: Staff sergeant for the United States Army, of Hispanic descent and a former Los Angeles gang member
- Julio "Oso" Vega: First sergeant for the U.S. Army, assigned to Chavez's squad of light infantry troops in Colombia.
- Captain Ramirez: U.S. Army officer who leads Chavez's squad. Later dies in a battle with the cartel.
- Buck Zimmer: U.S. Air Force senior master sergeant and crew chief of the Sikorsky MH-53 Pave Low helicopter used for the covert troop insertions and later for the rescue mission. Mortally wounded by ground fire during the rescue, he later dies in Ryan's arms; Ryan vows to financially help his family, a Laotian wife and seven children living in Florida and keeps his word.
- Captain Jeff "Bronco" Winters: U.S. Air Force F-15 pilot assigned to EAGLE EYE
- Colonel Paul "PJ" Johns: U.S. Air Force officer assigned to the 1st Special Operations Wing in Florida, in charge of the Pave Low covert ops helicopters
- Carlos Larson: CIA operative in Colombia, operating undercover as a general-aviation pilot and flight instructor who often does business with the cartel.

== Themes ==
Clear and Present Danger discusses the abuse of political and military power, and addresses the dangers of a government bureaucracy where no one can be held accountable for actions implied to be illegal by a democratic society. The book was released around the time of the Iran-Contra affair, which strikingly bears many parallels with the novel. Additionally, it pushes the narrative that the war on drugs, which was also a major issue during the time of the book's publication, is corrupting law enforcement, and that the status quo is enforced in this struggle.

== Reception ==
=== Commercial ===
The book debuted at number one on the New York Times bestseller list, and stayed on the chart for several years as well as its paperback edition. It became the best-selling novel of the 1980s, selling 1,625,544 hardcover copies.

In the same year its film adaptation was released, the book entered at number 33 on the USA Today's Best-selling Books list for the week of July 21, 1994, and later peaked at number seven.

=== Critical ===
The book received wide critical acclaim. The Washington Post praised it as a "rousing adventure" and "a crackling good yarn". The New York Times remarked in its review: "The issues raised are real ones, and a jump ahead of the headlines." Publishers Weekly hailed it as Clancy's best work since The Hunt for Red October.

=== Year-end lists ===
- 5th – David Stupich, The Milwaukee Journal

== Film adaptation ==
The book was adapted as a feature film, which was released on August 3, 1994. Harrison Ford reprised his role from the previous movie Patriot Games (1992) as Ryan, while Willem Dafoe played Clark. The film received positive reviews, with Rotten Tomatoes giving it a rating of 80% based on 40 reviews. It was a major financial success, earning over $200 million at the box office.

As in the previous film Patriot Games, Clancy was less than pleased with the movie due to script changes. He favored John Milius’s initial script, which was written before Patriot Games started production and closer to the book. However, when Donald Stewart was hired by Paramount Pictures to rewrite the script due to Ryan not being the central character, Clancy lambasted the new screenplay as "really awful" and criticized its technical inaccuracies. "First things first," Clancy continued, "Clear and Present Danger was the No. 1 best-selling novel of the 1980s. One might conclude that the novel’s basic story line had some quality to it. Why, then, has nearly every aspect of the book been tossed away?" Regarding the different ending, in which Ryan testified before Congress about the covert operations instead of privately confronting the President, Ford said: "We have softened somewhat the political bias [Clancy] brings to the subject, not because we’re bleeding-heart liberals, but because we wanted to divest it of some of its baggage and let it walk on its own two legs."

In a 2018 interview with Entertainment Weekly, Tom Clancy’s Jack Ryan creators Carlton Cuse and Graham Roland revealed that they originally opted to adapt Clear and Present Danger for television. Roland then explained: "About a month into it, we realized the reason the Clancy books worked so well was because they were relevant for the time that they were written. So we had to take the spirit of what he did and create our own original story."
