= Tom Clancy's Rainbow Six: Critical Hour =

2006 video game

- Developer(s): Ubisoft Quebec
- Publisher(s): Ubisoft
- Composer(s): Bill Brown
- Series: Tom Clancy's Rainbow Six
- Platform(s): Xbox
- Release: NA: March 14, 2006
- Genre(s): Tactical shooter
- Mode(s): Single-player, multiplayer

Tom Clancy's Rainbow Six: Critical Hour is a 2006 tactical first-person shooter video game developed by Ubisoft Quebec and published by Ubisoft exclusively for the Xbox. It is a console-exclusive entry in the Rainbow Six series. The game's plot, set during John Clark's retirement as leader of international counterterrorist organization Rainbow, recaps several past missions Clark handled during his time commanding Rainbow.

Critical Hour primarily consists of remastered levels from Rainbow Six, Rainbow Six: Rogue Spear, and Rogue Spear Mission Pack: Urban Operations. Fitting with the game's theme, gameplay is reminiscent of these titles, contrasting with the gameplay changes introduced in Rainbow Six: Lockdown.

Critical Hour was released on March 14, 2006. The game received mixed reception due to its small amount of content, though it was praised for following the roots of the first two Rainbow Six games. A PlayStation 2 port was planned, but never released. A sequel, Tom Clancy's Rainbow Six: Vegas, was released in November 2006.

== Gameplay ==
Critical Hour returns to the more realistic tactical formula seen in previous Rainbow Six games. The game returns to the classic gameplay from the original Rainbow Six and Rogue Spear, removing the "run and gun" element seen in Lockdown. Classic weapons and the tactical map return to Critical Hour from the previous games. Weapon accuracy is affected by injuries and running. The game features nonlinear levels.

=== Multiplayer ===
There are eight new multiplayer maps for Critical Hour, with 18 maps in all. The game modes include the standard Rainbow Six game modes, an assassin mode, sharpshooter, and last man standing. There is also a new skill for every PEC character type, and players can now have up to four PEC characters stored on one gamertag.

== Plot ==
In Critical Hour, John Clark is retiring and passing the leadership of Rainbow on to Domingo Chavez. While cleaning out his office, he reminisces on seven missions from his years as the head of Rainbow. He leaves these missions for future members of Rainbow to study and use for training.

== Development ==
A PlayStation 2 port was planned but never released.

== Reception ==
Reception

Aggregate scores
Aggregator	Score
GameRankings	56.58%
Metacritic	54/100

Review scores
Publication	Score
GameSpot	4.7/10
GameZone	6/10
IGN	6/10
Official Xbox Magazine (US)	4.5/10
TeamXbox	6.5/10

Critical Hour was met with a mixed reception. Video game review aggregator GameRankings displays a score of 56.58%, while Metacritic displays a score of 54 out of 100.
