= Tom Clancy's Rainbow Six Mobile =

2025 video game

- Developer: Ubisoft Montreal
- Publisher: Ubisoft
- Composer: Ludvig Forssell
- Series: Tom Clancy's Rainbow Six
- Engine: Unity
- Platforms: Android; iOS; iPadOS
- Release: July 15, 2025; 15 months ago (Latin America); February 23, 2026; 8 months ago (internationally)
- Genre: Tactical shooter
- Mode: Multiplayer

Tom Clancy's Rainbow Six Mobile is a free-to-play tactical shooter video game developed by Ubisoft Montreal and published by Ubisoft.

The game was announced on April 5, 2022. It closed its beta launch in September 2022. In 2023, the beta version was made available in Canada, Mexico, France, Chile and Colombia. In July 2024, Ubisoft delayed the game to April 2025 at the earliest. The game was released in Latin America on July 16, 2025. It was released internationally on February 23, 2026. Ubisoft announced on October 8, 2026, that the game would be discontinued as the development team shifts focus to other long-term strategic projects. The tactical shooter's servers are scheduled to shut down on January 15, 2027.
