= Tom Clancy's Rainbow Six: Lockdown =

2005 video game

- North American cover art
- Developers: Red Storm Entertainment; Ubisoft Montreal (Xbox)
- Publisher: Ubisoft (Note: Mobile version developed and published by Gameloft)
- Producers: Stuart White; Deke Waters
- Designers: Clint Richards; John E. Slaydon
- Programmers: John O'Brien; Jim Van Verth
- Artists: Tommy Jacob; Tony Nichols
- Series: Tom Clancy's Rainbow Six
- Platforms: PlayStation 2, Xbox, GameCube, Windows, mobile phone
- Release: September 8, 2005: Mobile; NA: August 3, 2005 PlayStation 2 & Xbox; NA/PAL: September 8, 2005; UK: September 9, 2005 GameCube; NA: September 27, 2005; PAL: September 29, 2005; UK: September 30, 2005 Windows; NA/PAL: February 16, 2006; UK: February 17, 2006
- Genre: Tactical shooter
- Modes: Single-player, multiplayer

Tom Clancy's Rainbow Six: Lockdown is a 2005 tactical first-person shooter video game published by Ubisoft for the PlayStation 2, Xbox, GameCube, and Windows. It is the fourth game in the Rainbow Six series. The game's plot follows Rainbow, an international counterterrorist organization, as they battle a terrorist organization that has stolen a deadly bioweapon. The PlayStation 2, GameCube, and Windows versions were developed by Red Storm Entertainment and the Xbox version was developed by Ubisoft Montreal.

Lockdown was first released on August 3, 2005 for mobile phones, with console versions being released in September of the same year and the PC version being released in February 2006. The game received average reviews mostly due to its departure from traditional Rainbow Six gameplay. A sequel, Tom Clancy's Rainbow Six: Critical Hour, was released in 2006.

== Gameplay ==
The player controls the main character, Rainbow team commander Domingo "Ding" Chavez, and leads a single squad in real-time through each level. The player can issue orders to team members, such as to breach a door or toss a grenade into a room. Missions are broken up into linear levels, instead of each mission taking place on a single non-linear map. Lockdown also gives players the ability to save their in-game progress at any time during a level, in contrast to some previous games' lack of an in-game save feature.

=== Console versions ===
The console versions of Lockdown features several "shooting gallery"-style sniper missions, in which players take control of Rainbow sniper Dieter Weber, and snipe terrorists from a position such as a small room or a helicopter while covering the entry of an AI-controlled squad into an area. The console versions also feature cutscenes that flesh out the personality and background of each Rainbow member, as well as collectible suitcases hidden throughout each level that can be collected for bonus material.

=== Windows ===
The Windows version of Lockdown removed the sniper segments and storyline-related cutscenes, and also included redesigned levels to match the less linear gameplay of previous entries in the series. Several other longstanding elements of the series that were removed from the console versions were added back into the PC version, including helmets on the character models. Lockdown is the first game in the series to remove the planning phase.

=== Multiplayer ===
The Xbox version of Lockdown features an exclusive gameplay mode for Microsoft's Xbox Live service called "Persistent Elite Creation" (PEC). This mode allows the player to have a persistent character while playing in online multiplayer games, who can gain levels. There are four "careers" to choose from: Commando, Medic, Engineer, and Spec-Op. Each class features different abilities and strengths: Commandos are able to use heavy weaponry and armor, Medics can use items to heal teammates during battle, Engineers can set up gun turrets, and Spec-Ops are stealthy and can use surveillance equipment. As incentive to continue leveling up, bonuses can be unlocked by achieving certain goals, such as new weapons and items. Light role-playing video game-like elements exist, such as stat points that can be distributed across various skills.

The PlayStation 2 version, while lacking the Xbox version's PEC mode, has its own online mode. Called "Rivalry", this mode pits teams of terrorists against teams of counterterrorist operatives.

The GameCube version of the game does not take advantage of the system's optional broadband or modem adapters, meaning there is no online mode. However, the GameCube version does include an exclusive two-player co-op mode.

== Plot ==
In 2009, Rainbow, led by John Clark, deploys their Alpha team, commanded by Domingo Chavez, to rescue the South African President from a rebel army surrounding Pretoria. Elsewhere in the city, the Global Liberation Front, an anti-Western left-wing terrorist organization led by Bastian Vanderwaal, steals "Legion", a nanite aerosol bioweapon that causes massive hemorrhaging and has a 100% fatality rate.

Later, the GLF attacks the Scottish Parliament Building. Alpha saves the hostages and captures some of the terrorists, who reveal a GLF cell's training facility under a distillery in Olivet. Alpha raids it to capture cell leader Derek Mergen; however, Mergen is shot by his own men in an attempt to silence him, but he survives and is hospitalized. After Alpha defends the hospital from a GLF onslaught, Mergen tells Clark the GLF is planning something, though he does not explain what.

Raiding another GLF facility in Paris, Rainbow learns a GLF cell will conduct an arms deal for the plan at the Port of Calais. Rainbow and the GIGN ambush the deal, but the GLF, expecting their presence, hijacks a ferry and rigs it with explosives to deter pursuit. Alpha, assisted by Rainbow sniper Dieter Weber, is able to board the ferry and defeat them without incident. GLF informant Nicolai Yazhov, a KGB rival from Chavez's CIA career, offers to meet with Rainbow in Marseille, but the meeting is an ambush and Yazhov flees; Chavez pursues and captures Yazhov, and Alpha saves him from GLF hit squads. Yazhov claims he was forced to organize the ambush, and presents Algerian arms dealer Faisal Amidan as a lead for their investigation.

Alpha infiltrates Amidan's heavily-guarded compound in Algeria, where they identify Vanderwaal. However, while exfiltrating, Weber is captured by the GLF. NATO, one of Rainbow's overseeing organizations, declares him an acceptable loss, but Chavez defies orders and rescues Weber from captivity. Investigating Vanderwaal's Gibraltar estate, Rainbow learns the GLF's plan is to attack the NATO summit in Barcelona and infect the world leaders present with Legion in a live broadcast. The GLF launches the attack later that day, but Alpha is able to defeat the terrorists and rescue the NATO leaders.

Rainbow tracks Vanderwaal to an old castle on Menorca, but he is nowhere to be found. Interrogations reveal Vanderwaal is attempting to leave Menorca to poison European water supplies with Legion. Alpha intercepts them, defeating the remnants of the GLF and killing Vanderwaal, ending the GLF's threat.

The plot of the PC version is essentially the same as the console version, the only differences being less missions, a slightly different chronology (such as Amidan being identified earlier), and the antagonists being multiple terrorist groups with the GLF acting as their organizer and Legion distributor.

== Reception ==
Reception

Aggregate scores
Aggregator	Score
GameRankings	(Mobile) 75.67% (Xbox) 72.83% (PS2) 68.67% (GC) 68% (PC) 63.47%
Metacritic	(Xbox) 74/100 (GC) 72/100 (PS2) 70/100 (PC) 59/100

Review scores
Publication	Score
Eurogamer	6/10
Game Informer	(Xbox) 8.5/10; 7.5/10
GameRevolution	(Xbox) C+ (PS2) C
GameSpot	(PC) 8/10; 7.7/10 (Mobile & GC) 7.6/10
GameSpy	3.5/5 (PC) 2/5
GameZone	(Xbox) 8/10 (GC) 7.8/10 (PC) 6.9/10
IGN	(Mobile) 7.9/10 (Xbox) 7.8/10 (PS2) 7.6/10 (GC) 7.4/10 (PC) 6.5/10
Nintendo Power	6/10
Official U.S. PlayStation Magazine	3.5/5
Official Xbox Magazine (US)	6.7/10
PC Gamer (US)	45%
Detroit Free Press	3/4

The change in gameplay from previous versions of Rainbow Six was considered a controversial move, and the PC version received significantly lower scores than its predecessors. The console versions of the game received more positive but still overall average reviews.
