= John Clark (Ryanverse character) =

Fictional character created by Tom Clancy

- Ryanverse character
- First appearance: The Cardinal of the Kremlin (1988)
- Created by: Tom Clancy
- Portrayed by: Willem Dafoe; Liev Schreiber; Michael B. Jordan
- Voiced by: Douglas Rye

In-universe information
- Aliases: Snake; J.T. Williams; Mr. Carlson; Ivan Sergeyevich Klerk; Rainbow Six
- Occupation: Director of operations for The Campus; Director of Rainbow (call sign "Rainbow Six"); Bodyguard for Jack Ryan; CIA operations officer; Navy SEAL (call sign "Snake")
- Family: Timothy Kelly (father, deceased); Mrs. Kelly (mother, deceased); Domingo Chavez (son-in-law); John Conor Chavez (grandson)
- Spouses: Patricia Kelly (deceased); Sandra "Sandy" O'Toole-Clark
- Children: Margaret Pamela Clark; Patricia Doris Clark

John Clark (né John Terrence Kelly) is a character created by American author Tom Clancy. He has been featured in many of his Ryanverse novels, often alongside its main character Jack Ryan. While Clark first appeared in The Cardinal of the Kremlin (1988), his origin story is detailed in Without Remorse (1993).

In comparison to Ryan, Clark has been described by Clancy as "Ryan's dark side" and "more inclined to take physical action than Jack is." A former Navy SEAL, he became an operations officer for the Central Intelligence Agency, and at one point served as Ryan's driver and bodyguard. During Ryan's first term as president of the United States, Clark served as director of a multinational counterterrorism unit codenamed Rainbow. After retiring from CIA and Rainbow, Clark worked for The Campus, an off-the-books intelligence organization created by President Ryan, later acquiring a position as director of operations.

In film, Clark has been portrayed by Willem Dafoe, Liev Schreiber, and Michael B. Jordan, the latter in a planned series including adaptations of Without Remorse and the in-development Rainbow Six. Clark has also appeared in the Rainbow Six series of video games.

== Profile ==
=== Personal life ===
John Kelly was born in Indianapolis, Indiana to Irish-American parents. His father, Timothy Kelly, served in the U.S. Navy during World War II and was a fireman who perished from a heart attack during a fire. John lost his mother to cancer when he was nine. He attended Brebeuf Jesuit Preparatory School in Indianapolis.

His first wife Patricia ("Tish") was pregnant when she was killed in a car accident. Six months after his wife died, Kelly had a brief relationship with Pamela “Pam” Madden, a former prostitute who had been forced into working as a courier for a drug ring. She was later recaptured by members of the ring and subsequently tortured, raped, and killed; Kelly was gravely wounded. While recovering from his injuries at Johns Hopkins Hospital, he met his future second wife, nurse Sandra "Sandy" O'Toole. (Note: As depicted in Without Remorse) They eventually had two daughters, Patricia Doris and Margaret Pamela.

Kelly, who had by now changed his identity to Clark, first met Domingo "Ding" Chavez during a black operation in Colombia. (Note: As depicted in Clear and Present Danger) They would later work together in succeeding novels. Chavez becomes Clark's son-in-law when he marries his daughter Patricia, and they later have a son, John Conor, who was born in Rainbow Six, although misnamed as John Patrick in Threat Vector.

=== Professional life ===
John Clark
- Military career
- Units: US Navy SEAL, CIA Special Activities Division Special Operations Group
- Awards: Military - Medal of Honor, Navy Cross, Silver Star with an oak leaf cluster, Bronze Star with Valor devices with 3 oak leaf clusters, three Purple Hearts; CIA - four Intelligence Stars (CIA's Silver Star equivalent)

As John Kelly, Clark joined the U.S. Navy at age 18 and later became a member of the 3rd Special Operations Group. He participated in special missions during the Vietnam War, which included the rescue of Admiral Dutch Maxwell's son Winslow III, a pilot who had been shot down and captured by the North Vietnamese Army; afterwards, Admiral Maxwell promoted him to chief bosun's mate. Kelly left the Navy soon after but was later re-hired by Maxwell and Admiral James Greer of the CIA for a rescue operation of a secret POW camp in North Vietnam. The operation was compromised by a KGB mole; nevertheless, Kelly manages to capture a Soviet colonel, who is then used as leverage to negotiate the transfer of the camp's prisoners to Hanoi Hilton. At the same time, Kelly wages a one-man war against a drug ring that killed his girlfriend Pam, and while he succeeds in taking them down, the Baltimore Police Department (including lieutenant Emmet Ryan, Jack Ryan's father) eventually identifies him as the man who murdered the drug dealers. In response, Kelly fakes his own death and goes to work for the CIA under the name John Clark.

As a CIA officer, Clark worked as a liaison with French intelligence (DGSE) during their raid on an Action Directe camp in the North African desert. (Note: As depicted in Patriot Games, revealed by Clark to Ryan in Clear and Present Danger) He also taught CIA trainees at the agency's secret training facility called "the Farm" at Camp Peary in Williamsburg, Virginia. (Note: As depicted in Red Rabbit) In the 2022 prequel Red Winter, Clark was assigned to provide covert security for then-CIA analyst Jack Ryan and CIA officer Mary Pat Foley when they investigate a possible East German defector in East Berlin. In his first literary appearance in The Cardinal of the Kremlin, he extracted KGB chairman Nikolay Gerasimov's wife and daughter from Tallinn, Estonia after the chairman defects to the United States.

In Clear and Present Danger, Clark was in charge of U.S. Army black ops units carrying out a secret war against the Medellín Cartel in Colombia. When the government abandons the men for political reasons, Clark works with Ryan as they fly down to Colombia and rescue the survivors, including Domingo “Ding” Chavez. In The Sum of All Fears, Clark becomes Ryan's personal driver and bodyguard, alongside Chavez. He is later tasked with bugging the aircraft of the prime minister of Japan in Mexico City, and when Palestinian terrorists Ismael Qati and Ibrahim Ghosn try to escape through Mexico after detonating a bomb at the Super Bowl in Denver, Clark and Chavez intercept them and secure their confessions.

In Debt of Honor, Clark and Chavez are sent to Japan to reactivate a network of CIA assets. When war between Japan and the United States breaks out, Clark and Chavez work to establish contacts in the Japanese government and are at one point tasked to eliminate a pair of Japanese AWACS aircraft. In Executive Orders, Ryan, who had become president of the United States following a terrorist attack on the United States Capitol, issues a pardon to Clark's previous identity as John Kelly. He is later tasked alongside Chavez with finding the perpetrators of a biological attack on the United States, who are revealed to be working for United Islamic Republic dictator Mahmoud Haji Daryaei, who is subsequently killed in a surgical airstrike in Tehran.

Clark later becomes the head of an international counter-terrorist unit named Rainbow, composed of elite special forces soldiers from NATO countries and based in Hereford, England. In Rainbow Six, they are deployed to seemingly unrelated hostage crises in Bern, Vienna, and Madrid, which are revealed to be ordered by a radical eco-terrorist group, which Rainbow tracks down to the Amazon rainforest in Brazil. In The Bear and the Dragon, Rainbow is temporarily deployed to the Russo-Chinese war in Siberia, working with the Russian Spetsnaz. In The Teeth of the Tiger, Clark is mentioned to have been awarded the Medal of Honor by President Ryan.

In Dead or Alive, Clark and Chavez are pushed into retirement from the CIA. They join The Campus, an off-the-books counter-terrorism and intelligence organization founded by President Ryan before the end of his presidency. Clark becomes involved with finding "the Emir", an international terrorist based on Osama bin Laden, as well as serving as mentor to Jack's son Jack Junior, a Campus analyst who wants to be directly involved in field operations.

In Locked On, Clark becomes a pawn in Czech billionaire Paul Laska's vendetta to discredit Ryan during the presidential campaign against incumbent Ed Kealty. He goes on the run in eastern Europe but was captured and tortured by rogue Russian foreign intelligence (SVR) operative Valentin Kovalenko. Clark is later rescued by the Russian government, who assigns him to temporarily lead Rainbow in order to retake the Baikonur Cosmodrome, which had been hijacked by Dagestani terrorists intent on launching nuclear weapons into Moscow.

In Threat Vector, Clark has been exonerated by the outgoing Kealty administration. After an assassination job on a cell of former Libyan intelligence officers in Istanbul, he briefly retires from The Campus due to old age. However, he later comes out of retirement when Chinese special operations forces attack the headquarters of The Campus. He travels to China with fellow Campus operatives and works with the local rebels and FSB to assassinate People's Liberation Army Chairman Su Ke Qiang, who has been waging war against the United States by trying to annex Hong Kong, Macau, Taiwan, and territories in the South China Sea by military force as well as sanctioning cyberattacks on the U.S.

In Command Authority, Clark becomes director of operations for The Campus, and has appeared in subsequent Ryanverse novels. In Defense Protocol and Rules of Engagement, Clark is portrayed as the commander of Task Force 99, a multinational unit similar to Rainbow.

Outside the novels, John Clark's career continues further in the Rainbow Six video game series. In Rainbow Six: Critical Hour, Clark retires and passes the leadership of Team Rainbow on to Chavez. Although Chavez appears in Rainbow Six: Vegas as Rainbow commander, no mention is made of Clark.

=== Awards ===
John Clark has been awarded the Navy Cross, Silver Star with an oak leaf cluster, Bronze Star with Valor devices with three oak leaf clusters, three Purple Hearts and four Intelligence Stars. He is also a recipient of the Medal of Honor, awarded and presented to him by Jack Ryan (then President of the U.S.) for the rescue of a downed fighter pilot during his time in Vietnam (see Without Remorse). He is a simulated major general in the Rainbow Six book, though he only reached the rank of Chief Boatswain's Mate (Chief Petty Officer) during his Naval career.

=== Distinguishing marks ===
Clark has a small tattoo of a red seal, sitting up on its hind flippers "grinning impudently" on his forearm. Though no other visual details are given, a comment made by Lieutenant Colonel Daniel "Bear" Malloy in Rainbow Six indicated that at least some soldiers in Ryanverse who dealt with special operations had heard of the red seal tattoo and understood that it was associated with the Third Special Operations Group (SOG), with whom Clark served during the Vietnam War. Clark stated that everyone in his unit got the tattoo. In the real world, having such a tattoo would violate operations security (OPSEC); however, similar tattoos are not particularly uncommon, so long as the tattoo is not specifically unit identifiable. Also, the Third SOG is not a real military unit, but a similarly named group, the Studies and Observation Group MACV-SOG, was initially named the Special Operations Group and was active in Vietnam in the types of operations and environments referenced in the series, and had Navy SEALs among its personnel. The symbol of the red seal is actually the unit insignia for SEAL Team 1.

== Literary appearances ==
The character John Clark appears in the following books:

- The Cardinal of the Kremlin (1988)
- Clear and Present Danger (1989)
- The Sum of All Fears (1991)
- Without Remorse (1993)
- Debt of Honor (1994)
- Executive Orders (1996)
- Rainbow Six (1998)
- The Bear and the Dragon (2000)
- Red Rabbit (2002) (mentioned only)
- Dead or Alive (2010)
- Locked On (2011)
- Threat Vector (2012)
- Command Authority (2013)
- Full Force and Effect (2014)
- Under Fire (2015)
- Commander in Chief (2015)
- True Faith and Allegiance (2016)
- Power and Empire (2017)
- Oath of Office (2018)
- Code of Honor (2019)
- Firing Point (2020)
- Shadow of the Dragon (2020)
- Target Acquired (2021)
- Chain of Command (2021)
- Zero Hour (2022)
- Red Winter (2022)
- Flash Point (2023)
- Command and Control (2023)
- Act of Defiance (2024)
- Shadow State (2024)
- Defense Protocol (2024)
- Line of Demarcation (2025)
- Terminal Velocity (2025)
- Rules of Engagement (2026)
- Pressure Depth (2026)

== In other media ==
=== Film ===
In 2012 Paramount Pictures began developing a film adaptation of Without Remorse, and reportedly were in early negotiations with Tom Hardy to play Clark. By September 2018, Michael B. Jordan was cast to play John Clark in the new film series. Without Remorse was released on 30 April 2021 and was directed by Stefano Sollima from a screenplay written by Taylor Sheridan and Will Staples. It is produced by Akiva Goldsman. Rainbow Six is currently in development.

==== Jack Ryan films ====
John Clark has been portrayed by Willem Dafoe in Clear and Present Danger (1994) and Liev Schreiber in The Sum of All Fears (2002).

In Clear and Present Danger Clark is initially depicted as a cynical and opportunistic mercenary, but slowly reveals his virtues. Clark aids Ryan in rescuing Clark's men from Escobedo and Cortez, saving Ryan's life.

In The Sum of All Fears Clark is depicted as a much more sardonic character, though he, like his novel counterpart, has also participated in numerous CIA operations.

=== Video games ===
John Clark features in his role as leader of Rainbow in the games Tom Clancy's Rainbow Six (1998), Tom Clancy's Rainbow Six: Rogue Spear (1999), Tom Clancy's Rainbow Six: Take-Down – Missions in Korea (2001), Tom Clancy's Rainbow Six 3: Raven Shield (2003), Tom Clancy's Rainbow Six: Lockdown (2006) and Tom Clancy's Rainbow Six: Critical Hour (2006).

Clark also features in The Sum of All Fears based on the film of the same name.

== See also ==
- Tom Clancy's Rainbow Six
- Tom Clancy's Rainbow Six (video game)
