= Fastlane (TV series) =

American action-crime drama television series (2002-2003)

- Promotional image: Facinelli, Thiessen, and Bellamy (from left to right)
- Genre: Action; Crime drama Police procedural
- Created by: McG; John McNamara
- Starring: Peter Facinelli; Bill Bellamy; Tiffani Thiessen
- Country of origin: United States
- Original language: English
- No. of seasons: 1
- No. of episodes: 22

Production
- Running time: 44 minutes
- Production companies: McNamara Paper Products; Wonderland Sound and Vision; Warner Bros. Television

Original release
- Network: Fox
- Release: September 18, 2002 – April 25, 2003

Fastlane is an American action crime drama television series that was broadcast on Fox from September 18, 2002 to April 25, 2003. On August 14, 2005, G4 began rebroadcasting the complete series.

== Plot summary ==
Van Ray and Deaqon Hayes are two mismatched cops teamed together by shady police lieutenant, Wilhelmina "Billie" Chambers, in a secretive undercover division of the Los Angeles Police Department. Operating with the motto "Everything we seize, we keep. Everything we keep, we use," their base of operations is the "Candy Store"—a warehouse containing a fortune in confiscated cars, clothes, weapons and everything else needed to blend into the seedy criminal underworld of Los Angeles. Given criminal covers, the officers use all of the resources at their disposal to apprehend dangerous criminals while walking the line between cop and criminal.

== Cast ==
=== Main ===
- Peter Facinelli as Donovan "Van" Ray
- Bill Bellamy as Deaqon "Deaq" Hayes
- Tiffani Thiessen as Wilhemina "Billie" Chambers

=== Recurring ===
- Jay Mohr as Roland Hill
- Mark Famiglietti as Jarod
- Big Boy as Aquarius
- Vondie Curtis-Hall as Andre Hayes
- Jennifer Sky as Cassidy Shaw
- Robert Forster as Raymond Ray
- Jamie Brown as Sophia Jones
- Bill Duke as Captain Parish
- Lamont Johnson as Wisdom Bailey

== Reception ==
Fastlane gained a cult following especially for the chemistry between the cast, the action scenes, the humor and the direction.

About the cult following, Peter Facinelli said:

You know that show had such a phenomenal life, I’ve gotten fan mail from all over the world. From Brazil to Europe to China, it’s been crazy where it has been shown. Yes, it has been in a lot of reruns on a lot of different stations. I know it was on G4 Network; it was on Court TV. But yes, definitely for a series that only had one year, it has definitely in the last four or five years been on a lot. I’m glad. I thought it was a phenomenal series. I had a fun time doing it. I’m glad that people are discovering it and rediscovering it and I hope that it continues this way.”

In retrospect, Tiffani Thiessen said: “That was an extremely fun show. I get stopped quite often by people asking why it ended, and I think it was a little ahead of its time. If Fox wouldn't have made the mistake – and they've actually [copped to] this – of showing the reruns four days later on MTV, and if that didn't take almost all of our audience away from our actual primetime showing, I think we would have been a huge hit and lasted a lot longer. You learn from the mistakes.

== Episodes ==
No.	Title	Directed by	Written by	Original release date	Prod. code
1	"Pilot"	McG	Story by : McG & John McNamara; Teleplay by : John McNamara	September 18, 2002	475183
After Deaq's brother's death, Billie partners Van with him to work on catching Deaq's brother's murderer. Meanwhile, Van seems to be interested in the murderer's fence, Cassidy Shaw. Guest stars: Craig Sheffer, Vondie Curtis-Hall, Jennifer Sky, Paul Gleason, John Doe, Big Boy, and Issac Hayes Cameo appearance: Fred Durst
2	"Girls Own Juice"	Paris Barclay	Kim Newton	September 25, 2002	175752
After taking a 1968 Mustang for a ride, Van and Deaq run into a group of three female jewel thieves. Billie subsequently puts them on the case after they convince her they can do the job better than RHD can. Guest stars: Abby Brammell, Tangi Miller, Tatyana Ali, Big Boy, Courtney Gains, Michael Cudlitz, and Antonio Fargas
3	"Gone Native"	Josh Pate	Alexandra Cunningham	October 30, 2002	175754
Billie assigns the duo to take on a brother-sister team of arms dealing Russian mobsters. After getting their cover almost blown by an ATF agent, Billie wants them to find out whether he's dirty or not. Guest stars: Rod Rowland, Ilia Volok, Natasha Alam, Levani, Lamont Johnson, and the Red Elvises
4	"Things Done Changed"	Josh Pate	Salvatore J. Stabile	November 6, 2002	175755
Deaq's ex-girlfriend contacts him to get him to help her get rid of her husband. As it turns out, her husband is a known criminal and Billie decides to let them go undercover anyway to get him off the streets. Guest stars: Terrence Howard, Tammy Townsend, Robert LaSardo, Dex Elliott Sanders, Jeff Philips, and Big Boy
5	"Ryde or Die"	Winrich Kolbe	Josh Appelbaum & Andre Nemec	November 13, 2002	175753
Billie forcefully assigns the boys to go after an Ecstasy dealer for no apparent reason. As the case unfolds, it's revealed Billie is a former heroin addict, and that the Ecstasy dealer was her provider of said heroin. Guest stars: Bill Duke, Salvator Xuereb, Big Boy, and Biz Markie
6	"Ray Ray"	Marcos Siega	Matthew Carnahan & John McNamara	November 20, 2002	175756
To stop a recently inherited crime boss seeking counterfeit to pay off Colombian mobsters, Van seeks help from his father, Raymond "Ray-Ray" Ray. Guest stars: Robert Forster, Iggy Pop, Brad Hawkins, T.J. Thyne, and Big Boy
7	"Wet"	Chris Long	Kevin G. Boyd	November 27, 2002	175757
When the contracted murder of club owner/thug, Wisdom Bailey, goes awry, Billie sends in Van to find out if a suspected hit woman, Sophia Jones, is the woman who tried to kill him. Guest stars: Jamie Brown and Lamont Johnson
8	"Mighty Blue"	Guy Bee	Josh Appelbaum & Andre Nemec	December 4, 2002	175758
Billie's best friend, Alexa Tan, receives help from Van and Deaq to take down Chinese Triad leader, Jackson Yu. Deaq and Alexa, however, seem to be more interested in each other rather than the case itself. Guest stars: Catherine Kwong and Ian Anthony Dale
9	"Get Your Mack On"	Leslie Libman	John McNamara	December 11, 2002	175751
After several prostitutes go missing, Van and Deaq are sent in after a murderous pimp, Nathan, to make sure it never happens again. Everything goes wrong when one of the prostitutes they're using to get in with Nathan turns out to be dating a federal prosecutor, and Nathan wants her dead. Guest stars: Pras, Bill Duke, Bianca Kajlich, and Channon Roe Cameo appearance: Michelle Forbes as Lena
10	"Dogtown"	David Barrett	Matthew Carnahan	January 10, 2003	175760
After busting one of Billie's former snitches, the snitch opts to let them take out the "Circle Gang" he's part of and their marijuana dealing schemes. But the snitch seems to have his own scheme in mind, instead. Guest stars: John Asher, Eric Mabius, Nicole Paggi, Billy Rieck, and Big Boy
11	"Strap On"	Greg Yaitanes	Kim Newton	January 17, 2003	175762
With several rich people's houses being recently robbed, Billie sends in Van and Deaq to take down the girls behind the burglaries, only to discover they are lesbians. Instead, Billie opts to go undercover with Van as a lesbian coming out of a marriage to a criminal. Guest stars: Jaime Pressly, Colleen Porch, Danny Murphy, Paul Ben-Victor, and Big Boy Special guest appearance: George Hamilton
12	"101"	Sanford Bookstaver	John McNamara	January 24, 2003	175761
The entire team helps rookie officer, Jarod, solve his first case against blackmailers who may be involved in the suicide of Jarod's friend. Guest stars: Mark Famiglietti, Hudson Leick, Bradford Tatum, and Jake Busey
13	"Defense (Part 1)"	Marcos Siega	Josh Appelbaum & Andre Nemec	January 31, 2003	175763
The team begins a case against a cop killer known as "Cyrus One", only to discover his tribe is involved in far more than that. Internal Affairs officer, Roland Hill, seeks out Billie to tell her she, Van and Deaq are being watched closely. The episode ends with a cliffhanger. Guest stars: Jay Mohr, Treach, Krista Allen, and Ricky Harris
14	"Offense (Part 2)"	Sanford Bookstaver	John McNamara	February 7, 2003	175764
The cliffhanger is resolved, Billie gets sentenced to jail for the murder of Cyrus by an agent on the inside, Skylar Case. Internal Affairs gives Van and Deaq 72 hours to solve the case and find out if she's dirty, without use of the Candy Store. Guest stars: Bill Duke, Jay Mohr, Krista Allen, Ricky Harris, Andy Umberger, Mark Famiglietti, and Big Boy
15	"Popdukes"	Josh Pate	Leonard Dick	February 14, 2003	175765
Van's father is released from prison and as far as Van can see, he's no longer interested in the life of crime. Until Nigerian criminals attempt to kill him, then Billie wants him to go under with Van and Deaq to settle it by giving the crime boss savings bonds of enormous amounts, which will result in the boss's arrest. Guest stars: Robert Forster, Jenny McCarthy, and Evan Dexter Parke
16	"Slippery Slope"	Guy Bee	Kim Newton & Case Krell	March 7, 2003	175767
Cassidy Shaw, who was let go at the end of the pilot, has been scamming and conning her way across the country and Billie puts Van and Deaq up to the challenge to get her. Many things go wrong, even so much as criminals contracted by Cassidy's boyfriend's boss trying to kill her. Eventually, Sophia Jones (from the episode "Wet", who escaped prison in the end) is one of the contract killers. Guest stars: Jamie Brown, Jennifer Sky, Costas Mandylor, Ned Schmidtke, and Robert Lipton
17	"Simone Says"	Paris Barclay	Alexandra Cunningham	March 14, 2003	175766
A former arms dealer recently gone straight is worried about his own safety and the safety of his teenage daughter, Simone. After realizing its best for her to know that she's being protected, he decides to let Van and Deaq guard her in public. Guest stars: Bill Duke, Mischa Barton, Don McManus, Timothy V. Murphy, and Mark Sheppard Cameo appearance: Jillian Barberie as herself
18	"Monster"	David Straiton	Alexandra Cunningham	March 21, 2003	175759
A gang banger's brother is murdered and Aquarius wants Van and Deaq to find the murderer and promises no gang related crimes will result from finding the man, who ends up being a rich white guy who runs a modeling agency with his wife. Guest stars: Sam Ball, Lobo Sebastian, Rebecca Mader, Darren Kennedy, and Big Boy
19	"Overkill"	Bill Duke	Hunt Baldwin & John Coveny	March 28, 2003	175768
Van and Deaq are sent after worldwide arms dealers who ship the weapons from Los Angeles to many international cities. Once their initial bust in Morocco goes awry, they discover the guns were stored in crates containing CD's from one label and they assume he, or someone working with him, is behind the distribution. Guest stars: Vondie Curtis-Hall, Bokeem Woodbine, Roweena King, David Chism, Joan Pringle, Clarence Williams III, and Big Boy Cameo appearance: Dale Earnhardt, Jr. as himself
20	"Asslane"	David Barrett	Josh Appelbaum	April 4, 2003	175769
Billie splits the team up for their latest assignment against a bimonthly meth deal called "The Summit" that goes down between two parties. Deaq goes after Murdoch and Ghost Goucher, the producers, as a dirt bike loving, meth smoking criminal. Van goes after the distributor, Lena Savage, a porn producer, as a porn star agent. Billie joins Van in the case as a porn star. Internal Affairs officer, Roland Hill, requests Billie sends in her old friend and informant, Nat Raiden, to help die mark the meth produced. Guest stars: Naomi Campbell, Tommy Lee, Navi Rawat, Scott William Winters, and Jay Mohr
21	"Dosed (Part 1)"	Sanford Bookstaver	David H. Goodman	April 18, 2003	175770
After going on a date with his hotel clerk, Hillary, Van gets poisoned by an unknown man who calls him offering Van the antidote in exchange for breaking out a prisoner. During the cliffhanger, Billie discovers clues that lead her to think the blackmailer is her former protege. Guest stars: Ali Landry, Hal Ozsan, Darren Richardson, Kurupt, Clarence Williams III, and Big Boy
22	"Iced (Part 2)"	Sanford Bookstaver	John McNamara	April 25, 2003	175771
Billie's former protege is revealed to be the blackmailer all along, apparently looking for revenge against her. He requests this time that they rob a bank in exchange for him giving up the names of the families he's poisoned with the same drug Van was poisoned with. The episode ends with an unresolved cliffhanger. Guest stars: Jay Mohr, Bill Duke, Ali Landry, Gina Tognoni, and Kirk Acevedo

== Home media ==
Warner Home Video released Fastlane: The Complete Series on DVD as a six disc set on July 8, 2008 in the Region 1. The soundtrack was significantly altered for the DVD release due to licensing issues. Episodes are cropped to be in the 4:3 format rather than the 16:9 widescreen format as they initially appeared on television.

As of 2026, the series is made available for streaming online on Amazon Prime Video, Plex, The Roku Channel (via their Howdy subscription-video-on-demand service), Sling Freestream and Tubi in the United States.
