= The Bear and the Dragon =

2000 thriller novel by Tom Clancy

- First edition cover
- Author: Tom Clancy
- Audio read by: Frank Muller (abridged edition)
- Language: English
- Series: Jack Ryan
- Release number: 8
- Genre: Techno-thriller; Military fiction; Spy fiction; Crime fiction; Realistic fiction
- Publisher: G.P. Putnam's Sons
- Publication date: August 21, 2000
- Publication place: United States
- Media type: Print (Hardcover, Paperback)
- Pages: 1,028
- ISBN: 0-399-14563-X
- Preceded by: Executive Orders
- Followed by: Red Rabbit

The Bear and the Dragon is a techno-thriller novel, written by Tom Clancy and released on August 21, 2000. A direct sequel to Executive Orders (1996), President Jack Ryan deals with a war between Russia and China, referred respectively in the title as the Russian Bear and the Chinese Dragon. At over 1,000 pages, it is Clancy's longest novel. The book debuted at number one on The New York Times Best Seller list.

== Plot ==
In Moscow, SVR director Sergey Golovko survives an attack on his way to work, when a car identical to the armored white Mercedes that he was in was shot with an RPG-7, killing the occupants (one of them a former KGB agent turned pimp) inside. Investigation of the incident by Russian police and later intelligence officers points to involvement from Chinese intelligence, and that Golovko was the real target. After the failed attempt on the SVR director's life, the Chinese later plot to assassinate the Russian president, but their agent, also a former KGB officer, is arrested by the FSB.

Meanwhile, U.S. President Jack Ryan gives Taiwan diplomatic status, which is implied as retaliation to China for secretly assisting in previous plots by Japan (Debt of Honor) and Iran (Executive Orders) against the U.S. Months later, during trade negotiations between the U.S. and China in Beijing, a CNN crew witnesses the murders of the Papal Nuncio to the country and a Chinese Baptist minister, when the two attempt to stop Chinese authorities from performing a forced abortion on one of the latter's followers. Two days later, police officers brutally break up a prayer service led by the Baptist minister's widow in their home, who had been outraged that her husband's body was cremated and dumped into a river without her permission. International outrage over the incidents leads to a boycott on Chinese-made products. With its economy already struggling due to recent military expansions, the country hastens its planned invasion of Siberia to access newly discovered oil and gold fields.

Ryan persuades NATO to admit Russia, and promises assistance against China to the Russian president. When the Chinese enter Siberia, the Russians repel their invasion force with help from the United States, causing heavy casualties on the Chinese side. The U.S. Navy attacks the Chinese mainland's coastal defenses and destroys much of the Chinese navy's aging fleet while it lies in port. F-117 Nighthawks destroy railroad bridges in Harbin and Bei'an with GBU-27 Paveway IIIs, seriously damaging Chinese lines of communication for their army in Russia. Ryan later decides to broadcast CNN's coverage of the war, plus direct feeds from U.S. reconnaissance drones, over a CIA website to counter the Chinese government's propaganda about the war's status and purpose.

Beijing's increasingly desperate leaders decide to ready their ICBMs for a potential launch. A joint NATO-Russian special operations team led by Rainbow operative John Clark is dispatched to destroy them. The team destroys all but two of the Chinese missiles. Of the two that launch, one is shot down by an AH-64 Apache while the second heads toward Washington, D.C. Ryan's family is evacuated, but Ryan himself decides at the last minute to stay behind on board a docked naval ship, the USS Gettysburg, which is equipped with the experimental Aegis Ballistic Missile Defense System. Ryan watches as the ship destroys the ICBM at the last possible moment. News footage of the ICBM's interception is later streamed through the CIA website.

Meanwhile, in Beijing, a group of Chinese students, spurred on by what they have seen on the CIA website, march through Tiananmen Square and invade a Politburo meeting, setting the stage for an overthrow of the government. A reformist Politburo member, Fang Gan, takes over and has the Communist leaders responsible for the debacle arrested, then orders an immediate withdrawal of Chinese forces from Siberia. Fang next holds an open discussion with the student leaders.

== Characters ==
=== The United States government ===
- Jack Ryan: President of the United States
- Robby Jackson: Vice President of the United States
- Scott Adler: Secretary of State
- Tony Bretano: Secretary of Defense
- Arnie van Damm: President Ryan's Chief of Staff
- George Winston: Secretary of the Treasury
- Ben Goodley: National Security Advisor to President Ryan
- Cliff Rutledge II: Assistant Secretary of State for Policy

=== The Central Intelligence Agency ===
- Ed Foley: Director of Central Intelligence
- Mary Pat Foley: Deputy Director (Operations)
- Chester "Chet" Nomuri: CIA field officer working in China, covered as an electronics salesman

=== The United States military ===
- Admiral Bart Mancuso: Commander in chief of the Pacific Fleet (CINCPAC)
- Major General Marion Diggs: Commander of the 1st Armored Division
- Dick Boyle: Commander of the Aviation Brigade attached to 1st Armored Division
- Bronco Winters: United States Air Force captain and F-15C pilot
- General Mickey Moore: Chairman of the Joint Chiefs of Staff

=== Rainbow ===
- John Clark: Commander of Rainbow
- Domingo "Ding" Chavez: Squad leader of Team 2
- Ettore "Hector" Falcone: Team 2 member, former Italian Carabinieri officer

=== Russia ===
- Sergey Golovko: Chairman of the Russian Foreign Intelligence Service (SVR)
- Gennady Bondarenko: Commander in chief of armed forces in the Far East
- Eduard Grushavoy: President of Russia
- Yuri Kirillin: Chief of Russian special forces, or Spetsnaz
- Oleg Provalov: Police officer based in Moscow
- Klementi Ivanovich Suvorov (Ivan Yurievich Koniev): Former Committee for State Security (KGB) lieutenant colonel hired by the Chinese to assassinate Golovko and later Grushavoy
- Gregoriy Avseyenko (Rasputin): Former KGB agent turned pimp who was killed by an RPG attack meant for Golovko
- Pavel Petrovich Gogol: Former sniper in the Red Army during World War II

=== China ===
- Fang Gan: Minister without portfolio
- Zhang Han San: Minister without portfolio
- Xu Kun Piao: General Secretary of the Chinese Communist Party
- Luo Cong: Defense minister and head of the People's Liberation Army
- Peng Xi-Wang: Commander of the Red Banner 34th Shock Army
- Yu Fa An: Baptist minister of Chinese descent
- Lian Ming: Secretary to Fang Gan and Nomuri's lover and asset (codename SONGBIRD) after unknowingly installing a program on her computer that downloads her superior's diary entries to the CIA
- Yang Lien-Hua: Yu Fa An's parishioner who had an unauthorized pregnancy

=== Other characters ===
- Cathy Ryan: First Lady of the United States
- Mark Gant: Secretary Winston's aide
- Alan Gregory: Junior vice president of TRW, later recruited by Secretary Bretano to investigate the feasibility of upgrading the Aegis Ballistic Missile Defense System to deal with Chinese intercontinental missiles (ICBMs)
- Mike Reilly: Federal Bureau of Investigation (FBI) agent assigned to Moscow, specializing in organized crime
- Renato Cardinal DiMilo: Papal Nuncio to China
- Reverend Gerry Patterson: Baptist pastor based in Jackson, Mississippi, Yu Fa An's friend
- Reverend Doctor Hosiah Jackson: Baptist minister and Vice President Jackson's father
- Barry Wise: CNN correspondent

== Reception ==
=== Commercial ===
The book debuted at number one on the New York Times bestseller list. It also debuted at number one on the USA Today's Best-selling Books list for the week of August 31, 2000.

=== Critical ===
The book received mixed reviews. While comparing it to Leo Tolstoy's novel War and Peace (1869), Entertainment Weekly praised the novel for its "excitingly cinematic climax", as well as for an abundance of African-American characters. Publishers Weekly noted "a handbook's worth of intoxicating, expertly researched, seemingly inside information". In a negative review, The Guardian bemoaned the length as "on full autopilot, and readers who haven't already quit from exhaustion might get the sneaking suspicion that the author too has long jumped ship", continuing: "Given [Clancy's] top-selling status, he has clearly progressed beyond any kind of editing."
