= Threat Vector =

2012 thriller novel by Tom Clancy

- Author: Tom Clancy with Mark Greaney
- Audio read by: Lou Diamond Phillips
- Language: English
- Series: Jack Ryan; The Campus
- Release number: 12
- Genre: Techno-thriller; Military fiction; Spy fiction; Realistic fiction
- Publisher: G.P. Putnam's Sons (US); Michael Joseph
- Publication date: December 4, 2012
- Publication place: United States
- Media type: Print (Hardcover, Paperback), Audio, eBook
- Pages: 868
- ISBN: 9780399160455
- Preceded by: Locked On
- Followed by: Command Authority

Threat Vector is a techno-thriller novel, written by Tom Clancy and co-written with Mark Greaney, and published on December 4, 2012. A direct sequel to Locked On (2011), President Jack Ryan and The Campus must prevent a Chinese expansionist government from enacting war in the South China Sea. The book debuted at number one on the New York Times bestseller list.

== Plot ==
Chinese leader Wei Zhen Lin has been dealing with mounting political opposition over his country's economic recession. He tries to commit suicide in order to avoid his inevitable arrest when he is prevented by General Su Ke Qiang, the leader of the People's Liberation Army (PLA). Aware that his life now depends on the hawkish military leader, Wei resolves to recoup his country's economic losses by retaking disputed territories in the South China Sea by military force, as well as Hong Kong, Macau, and finally Taiwan.

Expecting the United States to react to China's actions militarily, Su secretly orders cyberattacks on the country’s military infrastructure through sub rosa cyber espionage and cyber warfare militia Ghost Ship and its head, Dr. Tong Kwok Kwan. The Chinese Navy then aggressively harasses and sinks ships passing through the South China Sea, including an Indian aircraft carrier (sent there by India to protect its own interests). U.S. President Jack Ryan tries to resolve the conflict by covertly sending in a contingent of Marine fighter pilots in order to reinforce the Taiwanese Air Force. However, Su discovers this and further sanctions more cyber attacks on the U.S.

Meanwhile, The Campus deals with a breach in their organization when a hit job on a cell of former Libyan intelligence officers in Istanbul attracts the attention of a mysterious hacker codenamed Center, who is later revealed to be Dr. Tong. They later find out about one of his associates, Zha Shu Hai (codenamed FastByte22), who is a fugitive from the United States and is pursued by CIA non-official cover operative Adam Yao in Hong Kong. While a SEAL Team Six unit sent by the Department of Defense captures Zha first after a crossfire with his 14K Triad bodyguards, Campus operatives Jack Ryan Jr. and Domingo "Ding" Chavez, as well as I.T. head Gavin Biery, manage to gather intelligence from his hand-held computer, locating one of Center's command servers in Miami. Jack and fellow Campus operative Dominic Caruso try to go there against orders from operations head Sam Granger, only to be nearly killed by Russian mobsters sent by Center. After dispatching their would-be attackers and hastily escaping from Miami, the cousins are suspended from their duties.

Upon hearing news about Zha, Center relocates the Ghost Ship headquarters to Guangzhou. He later orders his hit squad, composed of a few Chinese special operations forces, to assassinate FastByte22 in a CIA safehouse in Georgetown in order to silence him. Center then arranges for Yao to be killed by a car bomb; however, the CIA officer survives the blast and goes off the grid, investigating Center on his own.

Jack later realizes that his girlfriend and CIA analyst Melanie Kraft had bugged his phone with a remote access trojan, explaining how Center knew of his whereabouts. Melanie had been blackmailed into spying on her boyfriend on behalf of corrupt FBI special agent Darren Lipton under orders from Center. While tailing Melanie on her way to work, Jack witnesses and later intervenes on an attempt by Center's hit squad to assassinate her. After calling in retired Campus operative John Clark to take care of Melanie, he leaves for Hong Kong to find Yao.

Center orders his hit squad to attack The Campus's headquarters in order to erase all their intelligence on Ghost Ship, killing Granger in the process. Clark and Melanie later intervene in the attack, killing all but two of the operatives. They also capture ex-SVR officer Valentin Kovalenko, who was unwittingly working for Center at the time.

In China, Jack tracks down Yao, who had discovered the location of the Ghost Ship headquarters in Guangzhou. After he informs his father, the building is later destroyed in a coordinated airstrike by American fighter jets, killing Center and his colleagues. The two then flee to Hong Kong and rescue a Marine pilot who was shot down during the strike.

Meanwhile, realizing that Su has been manipulating him for his own gain, Wei intentionally leaks his whereabouts during a phone call with President Ryan, who interprets it as an implicit plea to assassinate the military leader and passes this information to The Campus. Clark then travels to China and joins Chavez, Dom, and Sam Driscoll, who were sent earlier by director of national intelligence Mary Pat Foley to liaise with an underground faction of Chinese dissidents. Together and with assistance from Russian foreign intelligence, they manage to ambush and assassinate Chairman Su in his motorcade with few casualties. Afterwards they plant Center's two surviving operatives there as scapegoats.

President Ryan addresses the nation and threatens China with blockading the Strait of Malacca, crippling their economy by starving them of their oil supplies unless they cease military activity around the South China Sea. Once again cornered, Wei tries to commit suicide for a second time but accidentally shoots himself in his jaw instead and ends up choking to death on his own blood. Meanwhile, Jack and Melanie decide to break up due to their trust issues. The latter decides to resign from the CIA due to lying to the polygraph about her father being an unwitting asset for Egyptian intelligence.

== Reception ==
=== Commercial ===
The book debuted at number one on the New York Times bestseller list for the week of December 23, 2012. In addition, it charted at number three on USA Today's Best-Selling Books list.

=== Critical ===
The book received generally positive reviews. Kirkus Reviews praised the book as "a satisfying thriller" where "Clancy’s writing has shed some of its erstwhile woodenness" and "doesn't read a technical manual, which is all to the good". Publishers Weekly hailed the "highly readable if workmanlike techno-thriller", concluding: "Clancy fans will welcome all the high-tech data as well as heroes who can single-handedly take out whole teams of bad guys."

The book was nominated for Best Mystery & Thriller during the Goodreads Choice Awards of 2013, but lost to the novel Inferno by Dan Brown.
