= Tom Clancy's Rainbow Six =

Action video game franchise based on Tom Clancy's novel Rainbow Six Siege

- Genres: Tactical shooter First-person shooter
- Developers: Red Storm Entertainment; Ubisoft Montreal; Ubisoft Shanghai; Ubisoft Quebec
- Publisher: Ubisoft
- Platforms: Microsoft Windows, Nintendo 64, PlayStation, Classic Mac OS, Game Boy Color, Dreamcast, Game Boy Advance, Xbox, PlayStation 2, GameCube, macOS, Mobile phone, PlayStation 3, PlayStation Portable, Xbox 360, iOS, Xperia Play, Android, PlayStation 4, Xbox One, PlayStation 5, Xbox Series X/S
- First release: Tom Clancy's Rainbow Six; August 21, 1998
- Latest release: Tom Clancy's Rainbow Six Mobile; July 15, 2025

Tom Clancy's Rainbow Six, often shortened to Rainbow Six or R6, is a tactical shooter video game series by Red Storm Entertainment and Ubisoft, marketed under the Tom Clancy's banner of military-themed video games. Based on the novel Rainbow Six by American author Tom Clancy, it revolves around a fictional international counterterrorist organization called "Rainbow". Tom Clancy's Rainbow Six started in 1998 and as of 2024 consists of 13 entries with 6 expansion pack from early installments.

Tom Clancy's Rainbow Six is one of the most popular and most influential tactical shooter series, and early installments in the series helped propel the tactical shooter genre into the mainstream. Since the mid-2010s, a significant esports scene has formed around newer Rainbow Six games. As of 2016, over 32 million units have been sold.

== Setting ==
Tom Clancy's Rainbow Six follows a secret international counterterrorist organization called "Rainbow" (or "Team Rainbow"; capitalization varies between "Rainbow" and "RAINBOW"). The series is set in the canon Tom Clancy's universe, which is mostly shared with Tom Clancy's Splinter Cell and Tom Clancy's Ghost Recon.

Formed in 1999 by various militaries, law enforcement, and intelligence agencies to combat the post-Cold War global rise in terrorism, Rainbow is a rapid reaction force composed of "operators" from nations and organizations worldwide, ranging from special operations personnel and police tactical unit members to intelligence officers and field experts, trained and equipped to be the most capable counterterrorist professionals in the world, trained to resolve terrorist attacks, hostage-takings, bomb threats, raids, and major crises that local authorities cannot handle in an effective, reliable, or timely manner. Rainbow is headquartered at Stirling Lines in Hereford, England, but has global jurisdiction and can base themselves at other compatible headquarters (such as the Pentagon) should their continued presence in a region be necessary.

Due to the sensitive nature of their operations, such as being deployed in multinational incidents or against threats possessing weapons of mass destruction, and to simply prevent terrorists from knowing of their existence, Rainbow operates in absolute secrecy with complete plausible deniability, with only the most top-ranking government, military, and intelligence officials knowing they even exist. Cover-ups are often conducted after Rainbow's deployments to disguise operators as local police or military units, omit details that could alarm the public, or prevent the reporting of certain deployments.

The leader of Rainbow is designated "Rainbow Six" (or just "Six"), a designation created between the unit name and callsign (Rainbow) and Six, a radio call sign system used by the American military. The first Six was former U.S. Navy SEAL and CIA operations officer John Clark, who led the organization from its founding until his retirement. (Note: As depicted in Tom Clancy's Rainbow Six: Critical Hour) Since then, numerous individuals have taken the role of Six, the most recent being Harry Pandey. (Note: As depicted in Tom Clancy's Rainbow Six Siege and its later updates)

Though the Rainbow Six universe is generally grounded in reality and maintains its basic premise, newer installments and plot events partially depart from the series' established setting or Rainbow's traditional policies, with Rainbow hosting a publicly visible tactical competition, recruiting non-government or independent operators such as the private military company Nighthaven, and being deployed to defeat invading extraterrestrials. (Note: As depicted in Tom Clancy's Rainbow Six Extraction, which is considered non-canon)

== Video games ==
The first game was developed by Red Storm Entertainment, while the novel was being written. Red Storm was acquired in 2000 by Ubisoft, which has continued to manage the series ever since.

=== List of games ===
Games in bold indicate main installments.

Overview of released games
Title	PC versions	Console versions	Handheld console and mobile	Comments
**Rainbow Six**	Windows (1998); Mac OS (1999)	N64, PS1 (1999); DC (2000)	GBC (2000)	
Rainbow Six: Eagle Watch	Windows (1999)	N64 (1999); DC (2000)	—N/a	Expansion pack
**Rainbow Six: Rogue Spear**	Windows (1999); macOS (2001)	DC (2000); PS1 (2001)	GBA (2002)	
Rainbow Six: Rogue Spear – Urban Operations	Windows (2000)	DC (2000)	—N/a	Expansion pack
Rainbow Six: Covert Ops Essentials	Windows (2000)	—N/a	—N/a	Expansion pack (stand-alone)
Rainbow Six: Rogue Spear – Black Thorn	Windows (2001)	—N/a	—N/a	Expansion pack (stand-alone)
Rainbow Six: Take-Down – Missions in Korea	Windows (2001)	—N/a	—N/a	Not released outside of South Korea (stand-alone)
Rainbow Six: Lone Wolf	—N/a	PS1 (2002)	—N/a	PlayStation-exclusive game
**Rainbow Six 3: Raven Shield**	Windows, macOS (2003)	Xbox (2003); PS2, GameCube (2004)	Mobile phone (2004)	
Rainbow Six 3: Athena Sword	Windows, macOS (2004)	—N/a	—N/a	Expansion pack
Rainbow Six 3: Black Arrow	—N/a	Xbox (2004)	—N/a	
Rainbow Six 3: Iron Wrath	Windows (2005)	—N/a	—N/a	Expansion pack (DLC)
Rainbow Six: Broken Wings	—N/a	—N/a	Mobile phone (2003)	
Rainbow Six: Urban Crisis	—N/a	—N/a	Mobile phone (2003)	
**Rainbow Six: Lockdown**	Windows (2006)	PS2, Xbox, GameCube (2005)	Mobile phone (2005)	
Rainbow Six: Critical Hour	—N/a	Xbox (2006)	—N/a	
**Rainbow Six: Vegas**	Windows (2006)	Xbox 360 (2006); PS3 (2007)	Mobile phone (2006); PSP (2007)	
**Rainbow Six: Vegas 2**	Windows (2008)	PS3, Xbox 360 (2008)	—N/a	
Rainbow Six: Shadow Vanguard	—N/a	—N/a	iOS, Xperia Play (2011); Android (2012)	Based on the original game
**Rainbow Six Siege**	Windows (2015)	PS4, Xbox One (2015); PS5, Xbox Series X/S (2020)	—N/a	Online-only reboot
Rainbow Six Extraction	Windows (2022)	PS4, PS5, Xbox One, Xbox Series X/S	—N/a	Spin-off based on the limited time mode “Outbreak” from Rainbow Six Siege
Rainbow Six: SMOL	—N/a	—N/a	iOS, Android (2024)	Requires a Netflix account. No longer available.
Rainbow Six Mobile	—N/a	—N/a	iOS, Android (2025)	
Rainbow Six Tactics	Windows (2027)	PS5, Xbox Series X/S (2027)	—N/a	Turn based tactical game, spin-off of Rainbow Six Siege
