= André Nemec =

American screenwriter and producer

- Born: 1972 (age 53–54); Yonkers, New York, U.S.
- Education: University of Southern California (B.A.)
- Occupations: Screenwriter, film producer, television writer, television producer, showrunner

André Nemec (born 1972) is an American screenwriter and producer of television and film. He often works as a duo with his professional partner Josh Appelbaum.

His feature screenplays include Mission: Impossible – Ghost Protocol and Teenage Mutant Ninja Turtles. He is also the co-creator of the CBS series Zoo, as well as ABC dramas October Road, Life on Mars, and Happy Town. Other past credits include Alias, Fastlane, Going to California, and Profiler. He was also an executive producer and showrunner of the 2021 American live-action series based on Cowboy Bebop.

== Early life ==
Nemec was born and raised in a Jewish family in Yonkers, New York, where he attended Riverdale Country School with longtime writing and producing partner Josh Appelbaum. He then went on to attend University of Southern California. After college, he reunited with Appelbaum and subsequently broke into the entertainment industry as a television writer.

== Career ==
Nemec's list of early credits include Early Edition for CBS, Going to California for Showtime and Fastlane for FOX. Recognized for his writing talent by J. J. Abrams, Nemec spent three years working on ABC's Alias, where he rose to the level of co-executive producer. He then went on to co-create and executive produce ABC's October Road, Life on Mars, and Happy Town.

Nemec was then re-approached by friend and colleague J. J. Abrams to write Mission: Impossible – Ghost Protocol, the fourth installment in the multibillion-dollar film franchise starring Tom Cruise. This was Nemec's first produced feature film. Building on the successful experience Nemec had with Paramount Pictures on Mission: Impossible – Ghost Protocol, Nemec and Appelbaum were tapped to pen a reboot of the Beverly Hills Cop film franchise, starring Eddie Murphy. Other film writing projects include the 2014 installment of the Teenage Mutant Ninja Turtles franchise, as well as its sequel, and unaccredited writing work on Now You See Me, G.I. Joe: Retaliation, and Ghost in the Shell.

Nemec and Appelbaum also remain active in television where they are writing and developing (with longtime collaborators and friends Scott Rosenberg and Jeff Pinkner) under their banner Midnight Radio. As well, the aforementioned foursome, are writing and developing a Sci-Fi cable project for Steven Spielberg's DreamWorks Studio. He frequently collaborates with a tightly knit group of film professionals which include J. J. Abrams, Damon Lindelof, Adam Horowitz, Alex Kurtzman, Roberto Orci, Edward Kitsis, Jeff Pinkner, and Bryan Burk.

== Filmography ==
=== Films ===
Year	Title	Writer	Producer	Director
2011	Mission: Impossible – Ghost Protocol	Yes	Co-producer	Brad Bird
2014	Teenage Mutant Ninja Turtles	Yes	No	Jonathan Liebesman
2016	Teenage Mutant Ninja Turtles: Out of the Shadows	Yes	Executive	Dave Green
2019	Wonder Park	Yes	Yes	Dylan Brown
2025	Heads of State	Yes	Executive	Ilya Naishuller

==== Producer only ====
Year	Title	Director	Notes
2015	Project Almanac	Dean Israelite	Executive producer
2021	Without Remorse	Stefano Sollima	

==== Uncredited script contributions ====
- G.I. Joe: Retaliation (2013)
- Now You See Me (2013)
- Ghost in the Shell (2017)

=== Television ===
Year	Title	Writer	Producer	Creator	Showrunner	Notes
1998	Martial Law	Yes	No	No	No	1 Episode
1999	Profiler	Yes	No	No	No	1 Episode
1999-2000	Early Edition	Yes	No	No	No	2 Episodes
2000	In a Heartbeat	Yes	No	No	No	1 Episode
2001	Los Luchadores	Yes	No	No	No	2 Episodes
2001-02	Going to California	Yes	Co-producer	No	No	
2002	The Chronicle	Yes	No	No	No	1 Episode
2002	She Spies	Yes	Yes	No	No	
2002-03	Fastlane	Yes	Yes	No	No	
2003-06	Alias	Yes	Yes	No	No	
2007-08	October Road	Yes	Executive	Yes	No	
2008	Samurai Girl	No	Executive	No	No	
2008-09	Life on Mars	Yes	Executive	Yes	No	
2010	Happy Town	Yes	Executive	Yes	No	
2014	Star-Crossed	No	Executive	No	No	
2015-17	Zoo	Yes	Executive	Yes	Yes	
2016	Transylvania	No	Executive	No	No	TV movie
2017	Salamander	Yes	Executive	No	No	TV movie
2017-19	Knightfall	No	Executive	No	No	
2018	Everything Sucks!	No	Executive	No	No	
2018	Origin	No	Executive	No	No	
2019	Limetown	No	Executive	No	No	
2020	High Fidelity	No	Executive	No	No	
2021	Cowboy Bebop	No	Executive	No	Yes	
2022-present	From	No	Executive	No	No	
2023	Citadel	Yes	Executive	No	No	
2027	Scooby-Doo: Origins	Yes	Executive	No	No	
