= Josh Appelbaum =

American screenwriter and producer

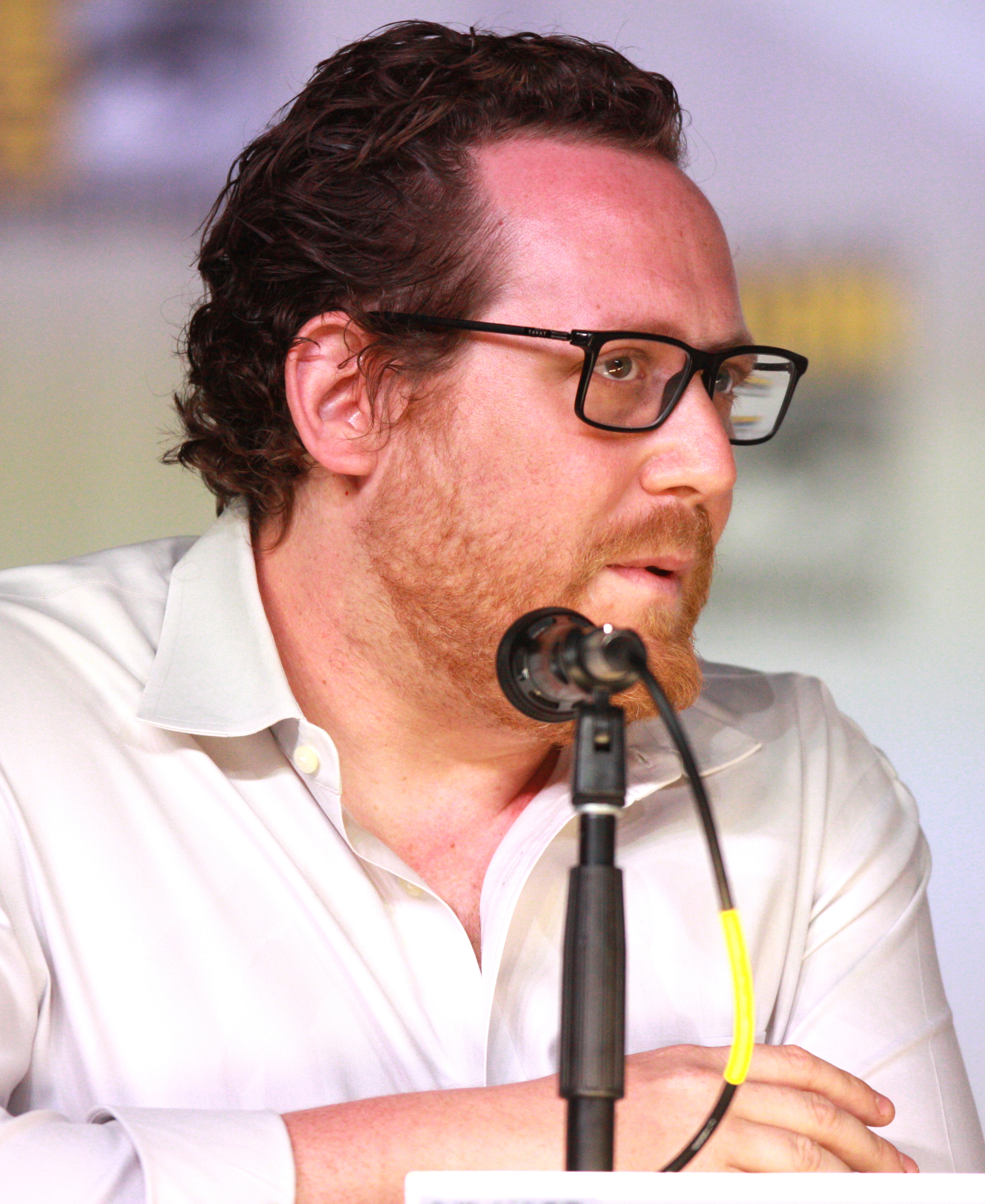
- Born: United States
- Education: B.A. The University of Southern California
- Occupations: Screenwriter, television writer, television producer, film producer, showrunner
- Years active: 1998–present

Josh Appelbaum is an American television writer, screenwriter, showrunner and producer.

== Biography ==
Appelbaum is from a Jewish family. He attended the Riverdale Country School in the Riverdale section of the Bronx, New York, with longtime writing and producing partner André Nemec. He then went on to attend the University of Southern California.

Appelbaum has written for shows such as Life on Mars, October Road, Happy Town and Citadel. He has also written or produced such films as Mission: Impossible – Ghost Protocol, Teenage Mutant Ninja Turtles, Project Almanac, Teenage Mutant Ninja Turtles: Out of the Shadows, Wonder Park and Without Remorse.

He frequently collaborates with a tightly knit group of film professionals which include J. J. Abrams, Damon Lindelof, Adam Horowitz, Alex Kurtzman, Roberto Orci, Edward Kitsis, André Nemec, Jeff Pinkner, Scott Rosenberg and Bryan Burk.

In March 2025, it was announced Applebaum and Rosenberg will produce an eight episode live action Scooby-Doo series for Netflix.

== Filmography ==
=== Films ===
Year	Title	Writer	Producer
2011	Mission: Impossible – Ghost Protocol	Yes	Co-producer
2014	Teenage Mutant Ninja Turtles	Yes	No
2015	Project Almanac	No	Executive
2016	Teenage Mutant Ninja Turtles: Out of the Shadows	Yes	Executive
2019	Wonder Park	Yes	Yes
2021	Without Remorse	No	Executive
2025	Heads of State	Yes	Executive

=== Television ===
Year	Title	Writer	Producer	Notes
1998	Martial Law	Yes	No	1 episode
1999	Profiler	Yes	No	1 episode
1999–2000	Early Edition	Yes	No	2 episodes
2001–2002	Going to California	Yes	No	3 episodes
2002	The Chronicle	Yes	No	1 episode
2002	She Spies	Yes	Yes	Wrote 2 episodes
2002–2003	Fastlane	Yes	Yes	Wrote 4 episodes
2003–2005	Alias	Yes	Supervising	Wrote 7 episodes; Also co-executive producer
2007–2008	October Road	Yes	Executive	Wrote 7 episodes; Also creator
2008	Samurai Girl	No	Executive	Miniseries
2008–2009	Life on Mars	Yes	Executive	Wrote 1 episode; Also developer
2010	Happy Town	Yes	Executive	Wrote 2 episodes; Also creator
2014	Star-Crossed	No	Executive	
2015–2016	Zoo	Yes	Executive	Wrote 1 episode; Also developer
2017–2019	Knightfall	No	Executive	
2018	Everything Sucks!	No	Executive	
2018	Origin	No	Executive	
2019	Limetown	No	Executive	
2020	High Fidelity	No	Executive	
2021	Cowboy Bebop	No	Executive	
2022–present	From	No	Executive	
2023	Citadel	Yes	Executive	
2027	Scooby-Doo: Origins	Yes	Executive	Showrunner
