= Jack Ryan (franchise) =

American series of action installments depicting the character created by Tom Clancy

- Official home release artwork, for the film series.
- Based on: Jack Ryan novels by Tom Clancy
- Starring: See cast below
- Distributed by: Paramount Pictures; Amazon Prime Video
- Country: United States
- Language: English
- Budget: Total (6 films): $265 million

The Jack Ryan franchise consists of American action-thriller installments, based on the fictional titular character from a series of novels written by Tom Clancy. Various actors have portrayed the role.

Despite inconsistency with its lead actors and crew members, the series has been distributed solely by Paramount Pictures since its inception. Mace Neufeld has produced every film in the series, with producing partner Robert Rehme co-producing Patriot Games and Clear and Present Danger, and Lorenzo di Bonaventura co-producing Shadow Recruit. With a combined unadjusted worldwide gross of $788.4 million to date, the films constitute the 57th highest-grossing film series. The films have been nominated for five Academy Awards, winning in Sound Effects (now Sound) for The Hunt for Red October (at the 63rd Awards).

The continuity of the films does not follow the established timeline of the novels. In the book series, Patriot Games occurs before The Hunt for Red October, but the order was reversed in the film adaptations. Additionally, The Sum of All Fears departs significantly from its source material, with the events of the plot shifted from 1991 to 2002. Jack Ryan: Shadow Recruit was a reboot set in 2013, intended to launch a new film series. A sequel was planned, but was never made. The franchise continued with a television series simply titled Jack Ryan, on Prime Video until 2023. Jack Ryan: Ghost War, which continues the show's story, was released in 2026.

== Development ==
After viewing galley proofs of Tom Clancy's 1984 novel The Hunt for Red October, producer Mace Neufeld optioned the rights to the novel in 1985. Despite the book becoming a best seller, no Hollywood studio was interested in purchasing the film rights because of the high cost of trying to condense the book's massive content into a two-hour film. "This book doesn't condense well into two or three pages", said Neufeld. "I read some of the reports from the other studios and the story was too complicated to understand. Fortunately, I was able to get a major executive at Paramount to read the book and he said: 'I think this can make a great movie. Let's see if we can develop it'".

== Films ==
Film	U.S. release date	Director	Screenwriter(s)	Story by	Producer(s)
The Hunt for Red October	March 2, 1990	John McTiernan	Larry Ferguson & Donald Stewart	Larry Ferguson & Donald Stewart	Mace Neufeld
Patriot Games	June 5, 1992	Phillip Noyce	W. Peter Iliff & Donald Stewart	W. Peter Iliff & Donald Stewart	Mace Neufeld & Robert G. Rehme
Clear and Present Danger	August 3, 1994	Phillip Noyce	John Milius, Donald Stewart, & Steven Zaillian	John Milius, Donald Stewart, & Steven Zaillian	Mace Neufeld & Robert G. Rehme
The Sum of All Fears	May 31, 2002	Phil Alden Robinson	Daniel Pyne & Paul Attanasio	Daniel Pyne & Paul Attanasio	Mace Neufeld
Jack Ryan: Shadow Recruit	January 17, 2014	Kenneth Branagh	Adam Cozad & David Koepp	Adam Cozad & David Koepp	Mace Neufeld, David Barron, Mark Vahradian, & Lorenzo di Bonaventura
Jack Ryan: Ghost War	May 20, 2026	Andrew Bernstein	Aaron Rabin and John Krasinski	Noah Oppenheim & John Krasinski	John Krasinski, Allyson Seeger, Andrew Form, Carlton Cuse, & Graham Roland

Jack Ryan story chronology
Original continuity
- The Hunt for Red October
- Patriot Games
- Clear and Present Danger
The Sum of All Fears continuity
- The Sum of All Fears
Jack Ryan: Shadow Recruit continuity
- Jack Ryan: Shadow Recruit
Jack Ryan (2018) continuity
- Jack Ryan (2018–2023; TV series)
- Jack Ryan: Ghost War (2026; film)

=== The Hunt for Red October (1990) ===
During 1984, Central Intelligence Agency analyst Jack Ryan (Alec Baldwin) must track down Red October, a technologically superior Soviet nuclear submarine heading to America's east coast under the command of Captain Marko Ramius (Sean Connery), and prove to the American government his theory that the sub's mission is not to attack the American coast, but to defect. Upon successfully boarding the vessel, Ryan is to signal the American submarine USS Dallas to assist Red October in escaping from attacks by the Soviet submarine V.K. Konovalov so that it may be brought safely into U.S. waters.

=== Patriot Games (1992) ===
Former CIA analyst-turned field operative Jack Ryan (Harrison Ford), is now a professor at the U.S. Naval Academy after previously receiving serious injury while intervening in an attack on the British Secretary of State for Northern Ireland in London and successfully killing one of the assailants. Because the remaining attackers were able to escape, the group now seeks revenge including Sean Miller (Sean Bean), the brother of the man Ryan killed. Miller vows to hunt down Ryan and avenge his brother, no matter how long it takes. Eventually, Ryan and his family are attacked in two separate, but simultaneous attempts. Ryan decides to rejoin the CIA, so that he can stop this group of Irish revolutionaries and protect the ones he loves.

=== Clear and Present Danger (1994) ===
Jack Ryan (Harrison Ford) is appointed as acting-CIA Deputy Director of Intelligence, as Vice Admiral James Greer (James Earl Jones) has been battling cancer. When a family close to the President is murdered in their sleep, by what appears to be a drug cartel, Ryan is called as investigator. Unknown to him, the CIA sends in a secret field-operative to lead an illegal, paramilitary force against the cartels in Colombia with the help of John Clark (Willem Dafoe). Risking both his life and his career, Ryan races against time to expose the truth.

=== The Sum of All Fears (2002) ===
A contemporary reboot, set during 2002, the plot portrays a younger Jack Ryan. After the President of the Russian Federation dies and is replaced by a man with a mysterious past, the United States goes on a Cold War-like state of alert. CIA director William Cabot (Morgan Freeman) recruits young analyst Jack Ryan (Ben Affleck) and assigns him to the situation in Russia, with the task to determine whether the paranoia is legitimate. Ryan soon discovers that a neo-nazi terrorist group plans to provoke a war between the U.S. and Russia, by detonating a nuclear bomb at a football game in Baltimore. Ryan works to resolve the assignment before it's too late.

=== Jack Ryan: Shadow Recruit (2014) ===
A second reboot of the film series, set during 2013. After the events of the September 11 attacks, Jack Ryan (Chris Pine), studying at the London School of Economics, becomes a Marine second lieutenant in Afghanistan. While on military tour he is critically injured after his helicopter is shot down. Twelve years later, Ryan is working undercover as a CIA analyst, and posing in a cover job on Wall Street as a compliance officer at a stock-brokerage firm. He quickly discovers that certain accounts are inaccessible to him as the auditor, which leads him to discover the scheme of Viktor Cherevin (Kenneth Branagh). With the help of Thomas Harper (Kevin Costner), Jack works to stop Cherevin's plot to collapse the US dollar.

=== Jack Ryan: Ghost War (2026) ===
In October 2024, it was announced that a feature film serving as a continuation to the Jack Ryan television series was in development, with Andrew Bernstein serving as director on the project with a script written by Aaron Rabin. John Krasinski and Wendell Pierce will reprise their roles as Jack Ryan and James Greer, respectively. The studio entered early negotiations with Michael Kelly to also return in his role from the series; while Krasinski, Allyson Seeger, and Andrew Form will produce the movie. The project will be a joint-venture production between Amazon MGM Studios, Sunday Night Productions and Paramount Pictures.

== Television ==
=== Jack Ryan (2018–2023) ===
Season	Episodes	Originally released
1	8	August 31, 2018
2	8	October 31, 2019
3	8	December 21, 2022
4	6	June 30, 2023

== Cast and crew ==
=== Cast ===
Characters	Films						Television series			
Characters	The Hunt for Red October	Patriot Games	Clear and Present Danger	The Sum of All Fears	Jack Ryan: Shadow Recruit	Jack Ryan: Ghost War	Season 1	Season 2	Season 3	Season 4
Characters	1990	1992	1994	2002	2014	2026	2018	2019	2022	2023
Jack Ryan	Alec Baldwin	Harrison Ford	Harrison Ford	Ben Affleck	Chris Pine	John Krasinski	John Krasinski	John Krasinski	John Krasinski	John Krasinski
Catherine "Cathy" Ryan (née Muller)	Gates McFadden	Anne Archer	Anne Archer	Bridget Moynahan	Keira Knightley		Abbie Cornish			Abbie Cornish
James Greer	James Earl Jones	James Earl Jones	James Earl Jones			Wendell Pierce	Wendell Pierce	Wendell Pierce	Wendell Pierce	Wendell Pierce
Sally Ryan	Louise Borras	Thora Birch	Thora Birch							
John Clark			Willem Dafoe	Liev Schreiber						
Domingo "Ding" Chavez			Raymond Cruz							Michael Peña
Matice Garth / Jeff							John Hoogenakker	John Hoogenakker		
Mike November						Michael Kelly		Michael Kelly	Michael Kelly	Michael Kelly
Elizabeth Wright						Betty Gabriel			Betty Gabriel	Betty Gabriel
Others	Marko Ramius: Sean Connery; Bart Mancuso: Scott Glenn; Vasily Borodin: Sam Neill; Andrei Lysenko: Joss Ackland	Kevin O'Donnell: Patrick Bergin; Sean Miller: Sean Bean; William Holmes: James Fox; Robby Jackson: Samuel L. Jackson	Robert "Bob" Ritter: Henry Czerny; Félix Cortez: Joaquim de Almeida; Ernesto Escobedo: Miguel Sandoval; Bennett: Donald Moffat	William Cabot: Morgan Freeman; J. Robert Fowler: James Cromwell; Anatoly Grushkov: Michael Byrne; Olson: Colm Feore	Viktor Cherevin / Rykov: Kenneth Branagh; Thomas Harper: Kevin Costner; Dixon Lewis: David Paymer; Rob Behringer: Colm Feore		Joe Muller: Victor Szelak; Mousa bin Suleiman: Ali Suliman; Hanin Ali: Dina Shihabi	Harriet "Harry" Baumann: Noomi Rapace; Marcus Bishop: Jovan Adepo; Nicolás Reyes: Jordi Molla; Miguel Ubarri: Francisco Denis; Gloria Bonalde: Cristina Umaña		

=== Crew ===
Film / Television	Crew/Detail					
Film / Television	Composer	Cinematographer(s)	Editor(s)	Production companies	Distributing company	Running time
The Hunt for Red October	Basil Poledouris	Jan de Bont	Dennis Virkler & John Wright	Mace Neufeld Productions, Nina Saxon Film Design	Paramount Pictures	135 minutes
Patriot Games	James Horner	Donald McAlpine	William Hoy & Neil Travis	Paramount Pictures, Mace Neufeld Productions	Paramount Pictures	117 minutes
Clear and Present Danger	James Horner	Donald McAlpine	Neil Travis	Paramount Pictures, Mace Neufeld Productions	Paramount Pictures	141 minutes
The Sum of All Fears	Jerry Goldsmith	John Lindley	Neil Travis & Nicolas de Toth	Paramount Pictures, Mace Neufeld Productions, MFP Munich Film Partners, S.O.A.F. Productions	Paramount Pictures	124 minutes
Jack Ryan: Shadow Recruit	Patrick Doyle	Haris Zambarloukos	Martin Walsh	Paramount Pictures, Mace Neufeld Productions, di Bonaventura Pictures, Skydance Media	Paramount Pictures	105 minutes
Jack Ryan	Ramin Djawadi	Richard Rutkowski, Christopher Faloona, Checco Varese, Patrick Murguia, Jeffrey Greeley, and Arnau Valls Colomer	Paul Trejo, John M. Valerio, Sarah Boyd, Vikash Patel, Mark Goldman, and Stephen Semel	Amazon Original Series, Genre Arts, Push, Boot., Platinum Dunes, Skydance Television, Paramount Television Studios, Amazon Studios, Sunday Night Productions	Amazon Prime Video	1800 minutes (1 hour per episode)
Jack Ryan: Ghost War	Ramin Djawadi and William Marriott	Arnau Valls Colomer	Jason Ballantine	Paramount Pictures, Amazon MGM Studios, Sunday Night Productions	Amazon Prime Video	107 minutes

== Reception ==
=== Box office performance ===
Film	U.S. release date	Box office revenue			Budget	Reference
Film	U.S. release date	United States	International	Worldwide	Budget	Reference
The Hunt for Red October	March 2, 1990	$122,012,643	$78,500,000	$200,512,643	$30,000,000	
Patriot Games	June 5, 1992	$83,351,587	$94,700,000	$178,051,587	$45,000,000	
Clear and Present Danger	August 3, 1994	$122,187,717	$93,700,000	$215,887,717	$62,000,000	
The Sum of All Fears	May 31, 2002	$118,907,036	$75,014,336	$193,921,372	$68,000,000	
Jack Ryan: Shadow Recruit	January 17, 2014	$50,577,412	$84,933,618	$135,511,030	$60,000,000	
Total		$497,036,395	$426,847,954	$923,884,349	$265,000,000	

=== Critical and public response ===
Film	Rotten Tomatoes	Metacritic	CinemaScore
The Hunt for Red October	88% (76 reviews)	58 (17 reviews)	A
Patriot Games	72% (102 reviews)	64 (23 reviews)	A–
Clear and Present Danger	81% (47 reviews)	74 (14 reviews)	A
The Sum of All Fears	59% (175 reviews)	45 (35 reviews)	A–
Jack Ryan: Shadow Recruit	55% (191 reviews)	57 (36 reviews)	B
Jack Ryan: Ghost War	43% (46 reviews)	38 (14 reviews)	—N/a

== Home media ==
On February 7, 2003, Paramount announced a box set entitled The Jack Ryan Special Edition DVD Collection, which includes new editions of The Hunt for Red October, Patriot Games and Clear and Present Danger as well as the special edition of The Sum of All Fears. Both the set and the individual editions of each film were released on May 6, 2003. While the four films were originally intended to be released in a Blu-ray collection entitled The Jack Ryan Collection, the films were later broken up into separate releases for the high definition format on July 29, 2008. On December 3, 2013, The Jack Ryan Collection was finally issued on Blu-ray.

== Other media ==
=== Video games ===
The film series has spawned three video games for various systems. Two side scroller games were produced in 1990 to coincide with the release of The Hunt for Red October, one for computer systems was released by Grandslam Interactive Ltd. while another was released for Nintendo consoles by Hi-Tech Expressions, Inc. In 2002, the video game The Sum of All Fears was released by Ubisoft for Microsoft Windows, PlayStation 2, and GameCube.

Domingo Chavez (as Ding Chavez) and John Clark both appear as a member and the leader of Team Rainbow in the older Rainbow Six games, these characters also appeared in the book.

=== Cancelled projects ===
A film, based on the novel The Cardinal of the Kremlin, was planned. It was to involve Harrison Ford and William Shatner. It was never produced and the idea was most likely scrapped. A sequel to Jack Ryan: Shadow Recruit was planned, however it was cancelled due to the film's box office performance.
