= The Sum of All Fears (film) =

2002 film by Phil Alden Robinson

- Theatrical release poster
- Directed by: Phil Alden Robinson
- Screenplay by: Paul Attanasio; Daniel Pyne
- Based on: The Sum of All Fears by Tom Clancy
- Produced by: Mace Neufeld
- Starring: Ben Affleck; Morgan Freeman; James Cromwell; Liev Schreiber; Alan Bates; Philip Baker Hall; Ron Rifkin; Bruce McGill
- Cinematography: John Lindley
- Edited by: Neil Travis; Nicolas de Toth
- Music by: Jerry Goldsmith
- Production companies: Mace Neufeld Productions; MFP Munich Film Partners; S.O.A.F. Productions; Paramount Pictures
- Distributed by: Paramount Pictures
- Release dates: May 29, 2002 (Los Angeles premiere); May 31, 2002 (United States)
- Running time: 124 minutes
- Country: United States
- Language: English
- Budget: $68 million
- Box office: $194 million

The Sum of All Fears is a 2002 American spy thriller film directed by Phil Alden Robinson, based on Tom Clancy's 1991 novel of the same name. The film, which is set in the Jack Ryan franchise, is a reboot taking place in 2002. Jack Ryan is portrayed as a younger character by Ben Affleck, in comparison with the previous films: The Hunt for Red October (1990) starring Alec Baldwin as Jack Ryan and the sequels, Patriot Games (1992) and Clear and Present Danger (1994), both starring Harrison Ford in the role.

In the film, an Austrian Neo-Nazi (Alan Bates) attempts to trigger a nuclear war between the United States and Russia by setting off a nuclear device in Baltimore, simultaneously with a rogue Russian officer launching an attack on an American aircraft carrier in his desire to establish a European fascist superstate. CIA analyst Ryan (Affleck) races against time to find a way to prevent a nuclear war.

The film was a co-production between the motion picture studios of Paramount Pictures, Mace Neufeld Productions, MFP Munich Film Partners, and S.O.A.F. Productions. The film premiered in theaters in the United States on May 31, 2002, and received mixed reviews from critics, but was a financial success, having a worldwide theatrical run of $193.9 million compared to its production budget of $68 million and related marketing costs. On June 4, 2002, the original motion picture soundtrack was released by Elektra Records. The soundtrack was composed and orchestrated by musician Jerry Goldsmith.

== Plot ==
In 1973, during the Yom Kippur War, an Israeli warplane carrying a nuclear bomb crashes. In 2002, Ghazi, a Syrian scrap collector, recovers the bomb from a field in the Golan Heights. He sells it to South African black market arms trafficker Derek Olson, who resells it to a neo-Nazi group led by Austrian billionaire Richard Dressler. The group's aim is to start a war between the United States and Russia that will devastate them both, leaving a united fascist Europe to rule the world.

CIA analyst Jack Ryan is summoned by Director William Cabot to accompany him to Moscow to meet new Russian President Alexander Nemerov. There, Cabot and Ryan are allowed to examine a Russian nuclear weapons facility as prescribed by the START treaty, where Ryan notices the absence of three scientists listed on the facility's roster. After receiving intelligence from "Spinnaker", an informant inside the Kremlin, Cabot sends operative John Clark to investigate. Clark tracks the scientists to a former Soviet military facility in Ukraine, where Cabot suspects they are building a nuclear weapon that Russia could use untraceably; Russian and U.S. relations are strained due to Russia's war in Chechnya.

Ryan and his colleagues discern that a crate from the Ukraine facility was flown to the Canary Islands, then sent to Baltimore on a cargo ship. Ryan warns Cabot, who is attending a football game in the city with U.S. President Robert Fowler. Fowler is evacuated before the bomb detonates, but the stadium and much of Baltimore is destroyed, Cabot is also mortally wounded. Worsening matters, a corrupt Russian Air Force general paid by Dressler sends warplanes to attack a U.S. aircraft carrier, leading the U.S. to believe that Russia perpetrated the nuclear bombing. Fowler orders a nuclear strike on Russia.

Ryan learns from a radiation assessment team that the isotopic signature from the nuclear blast indicates that the bomb was manufactured in the U.S., which seems to exonerate Russia. In Syria, Clark tracks down Ghazi, now dying of radiation exposure. He tells Clark that he sold the bomb to Olson, who lives in Damascus. Ryan's colleagues at Langley infiltrate Olson's computer and download files that implicate Dressler as the person behind the explosion. Ryan is able to reach the National Military Command Center in The Pentagon and get a message to Nemerov, saying that he knows that Russia was not behind the attack, while also asking him to unilaterally stand down his forces as a show of good faith. Nemerov agrees to do so as Fowler follows suit.

The attack's perpetrators, including Olson and Dressler, are assassinated. Fowler and Nemerov announce new measures to counter nuclear proliferation in joint speeches at the White House, as Ryan and his fiancée Dr. Catherine Muller listen in. Spinnaker, who is revealed to be Nemerov's senior advisor Anatoli Grushkov, gives Catherine a gift for their engagement, despite them having told no one the news.

== Cast ==
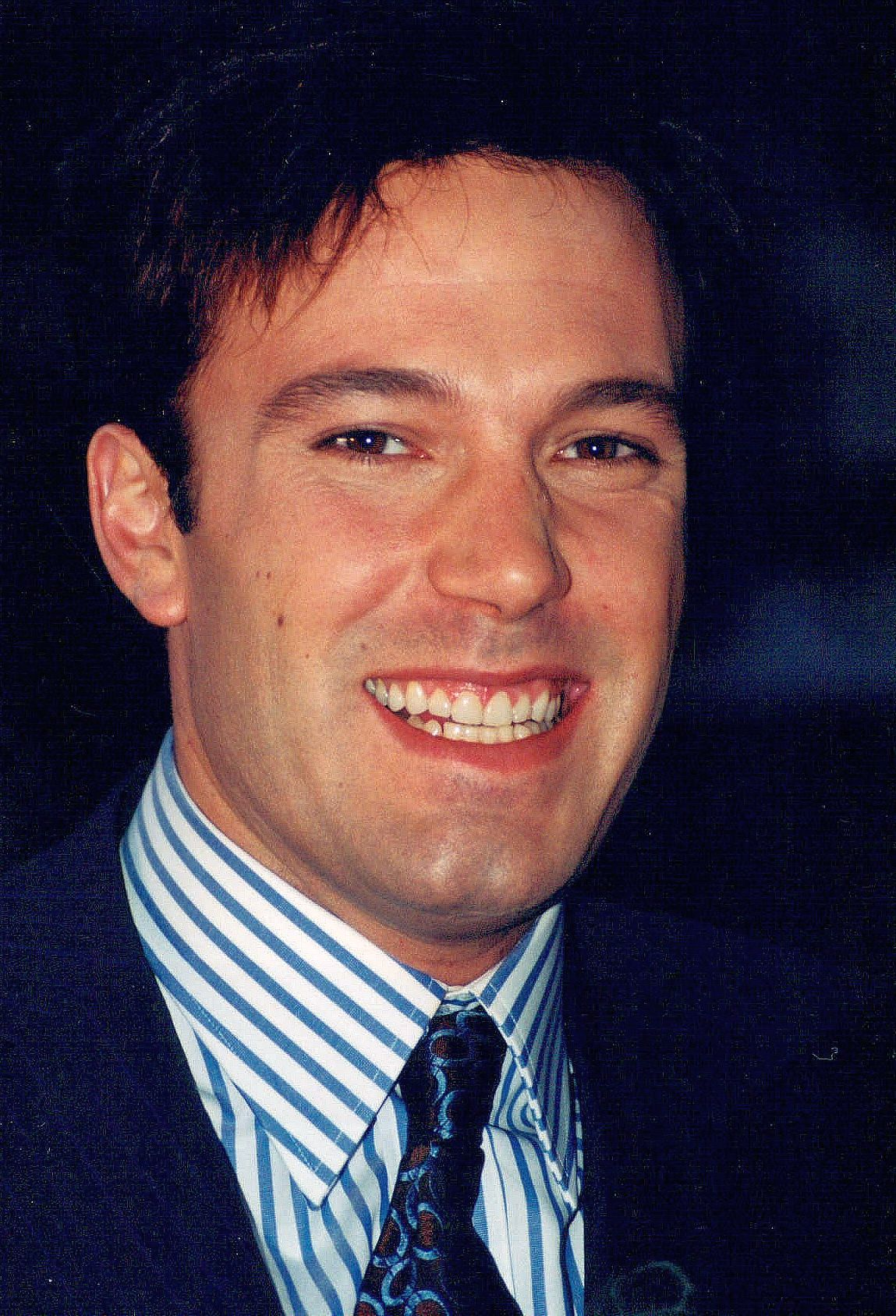
Ben Affleck, the third actor in the film series to portray the character of Jack Ryan, in 1998

- Ben Affleck as Jack Ryan
- Morgan Freeman as DCI William Cabot
- James Cromwell as President Robert Fowler
- Liev Schreiber as John Clark
- Bridget Moynahan as Dr. Cathy Muller
- Alan Bates as Richard Dressler
- Ciarán Hinds as Russian President Alexander Nemerov
- Philip Baker Hall as Defense Secretary David Becker
- Ron Rifkin as Secretary of State Sidney Owens
- Bruce McGill as National Security Advisor Gene Revell
- Colm Feore as Derek Olson
- Josef Sommer as Senator Jessup
- Ken Jenkins as Admiral Pollack
- Michael Byrne as Anatoli Grushkov
- John Beasley as General Lasseter
- Jamie Harrold as Dillon
- Stefan Kalipha as Arab Gravedigger

== Production ==
=== Development ===
In 1991, Paramount Pictures negotiated with Tom Clancy for the rights to adapt The Sum of All Fears, but the talks stalled after he became reluctant to concede film rights to further works due to his dissatisfaction with the adaptation of Patriot Games. Clancy ultimately agreed after he reached a large cash settlement with the studio president Brandon Tartikoff. However, producer Mace Neufeld was not enthusiastic to adapt the book after the release of Clear and Present Danger in 1994 due to its similarities with the story of Black Sunday and concerns over depicting controversial subjects such as terrorism and the Israeli–Palestinian conflict. A year was spent developing Tom Clancy's The Cardinal of the Kremlin before the material was deemed too difficult to adapt. An adaptation of Debt of Honor or a new screenplay unrelated to any of Clancy's books were also considered.

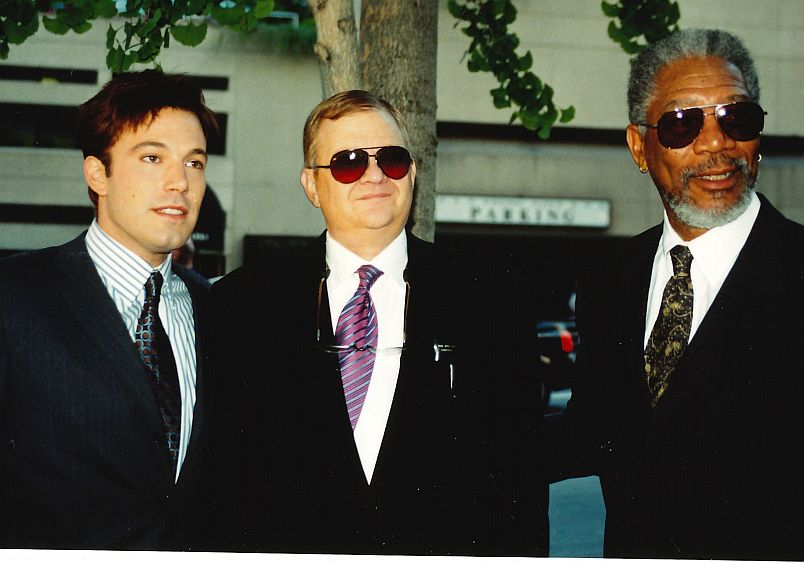
Left to right: Ben Affleck, Tom Clancy, and Morgan Freeman in 2002

In October 1999, Harrison Ford announced that the next Jack Ryan novel being scripted into a film would indeed be The Sum of All Fears and that "hopefully we'll get that to a place where we can make a movie." During this time, writer Akiva Goldsman wrote multiple drafts of the script. However, on June 8, 2000, it was announced that Ford had dropped out of the film after he and director Phillip Noyce were unable to work out script problems. It was later announced that Ben Affleck would take on the role in a $10 million deal that would see the series rebooted with Jack Ryan portrayed at an earlier stage in life. "The day I received the offer to play Jack Ryan, I was filming a Pearl Harbor scene with Alec Baldwin. He was very sweet and said I should do it," said Affleck. "I wouldn't have done the movie without talking to Harrison Ford first. He gave me his blessing. That's what I needed to hear." Months after Affleck became attached to the project, director Phil Alden Robinson was brought on to lead it.

While the basic plot is the same in the movie as in the book, there were significant changes. Noting these substantial changes, in the commentary track on the DVD release, Tom Clancy jokingly introduced himself as "the author of the book that he [director Phil Alden Robinson, who is present with Clancy] ignored" and spending most of the commentary poking fun at the film's factual inaccuracies and differences from the source material. Perhaps the largest change were the original terrorists. In the novel, they were Arab nationalists, but in the film, they were changed to neo-Nazis. A common misconception is that this was done as a reaction to the September 11, 2001, attacks, but the movie finished filming in June 2001.

On the "making-of" DVD extra, director Alden Robinson said that the change was purely for elements relating to the plot, because Arab terrorists would not be able to plausibly accomplish all that was necessary for the story to work. In addition, the terrorists in the book received significant aid from disaffected former agents of the recently defunct East Germany. The group Council on American-Islamic Relations (CAIR) did mount a two-year lobbying campaign that ended on January 26, 2001, against using "Muslim villains", as the original book version did.

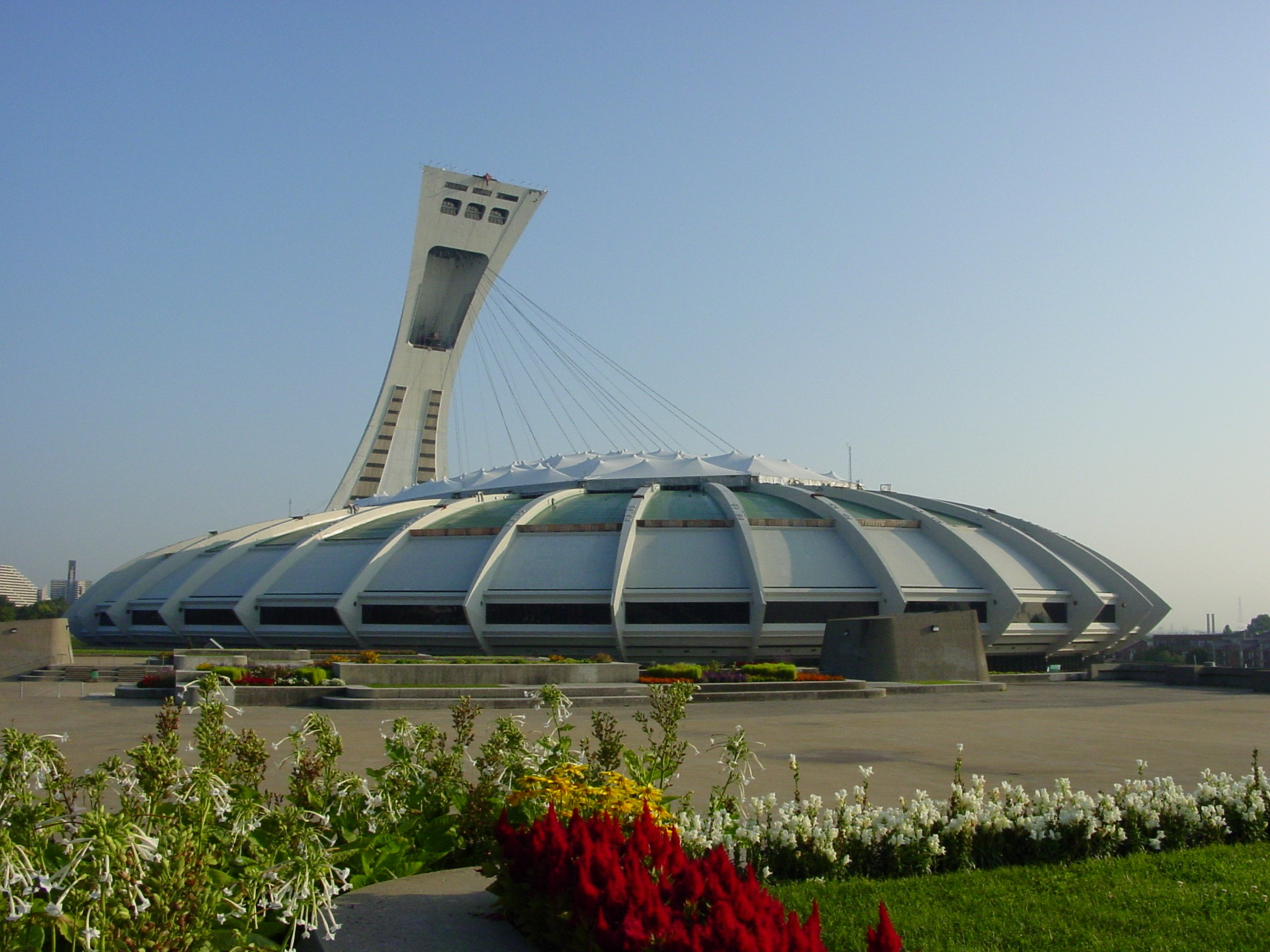
Olympic Stadium in Montreal, where the football game scenes were filmed

Screenwriter Dan Pyne claimed that the decision to not use Arab terrorists was "possibly because that has become a cliché. At the time that I started writing The Sum of All Fears, Jörg Haider was just starting to come into play in Austria. And simultaneous with that, I think, there was some neo-nationalist activity in Holland, and there was stuff going on in Spain and in Italy. So it seemed like a logical and lasting idea that would be universal." It has also been noted that a larger percent of profits stems from international audiences, and US filmmakers work to avoid alienating large segments of this customer base.

=== Filming ===
Principal photography for The Sum of All Fears began on February 12, 2001, in Montreal, Quebec. A majority of the film was shot in Montreal, including the sequences at the football game that were shot in the city's Olympic Stadium. Additional filming was done at the Diefenbunker in Ottawa, Ontario. Production finished in June 2001. The interior scene of the aircraft carrier USS John C. Stennis was filmed on a set used in the television series JAG.

The US Army provided fighter jets, helicopters, ground vehicles and soldiers for the film, while National Airborne Operations Center and the CIA served as on-set advisors for filming in Montreal. The Pentagon disliked a scene where a carrier was blown up due to the impression they believed it gave, as a result the scene was rewritten.

== Soundtrack ==
The Sum of All Fears (Music from the Motion Picture)

Film score by Jerry Goldsmith
- Released: June 4, 2002 (original); March 12, 2014 (expanded)
- Length: 49:30 (original); 78:48 (expanded)
- Labels: Elektra (original); La-La Land (expanded)

The musical score to The Sum of All Fears is composed by Jerry Goldsmith. A soundtrack album was released on June 4, 2002, by Elektra Records. In addition to Goldsmith's score, the soundtrack also includes source music such as "If We Get Through This" by Tabitha Fair and "Nessun dorma" by Giacomo Puccini. There are also two tracks from the album ("If We Could Remember" and "The Mission") that are vocal interpretations of Goldsmith's primary theme co-written by singer-songwriter Paul Williams. On March 12, 2014, an expanded edition was released by La-La Land Records.

The Sum of All Fears (Music from the Motion Picture): Elektra
No.	Title	Length
1.	"If We Could Remember"	3:30
2.	"The Mission"	5:57
3.	"The Bomb"	2:55
4.	"That Went Well"	2:45
5.	"Clear the Stadium"	1:33
6.	"If We Get Through This"	3:36
7.	"The Deal"	2:34
8.	"Changes"	2:27
9.	"Snap Count"	2:12
10.	"His Name Is Olson"	1:51
11.	"Nessun Dorma from Turandot"	2:58
12.	"Deserted Lab"	1:52
13.	"Real Time"	2:51
14.	"How Close?"	6:05
15.	"The Same Air"	2:01
16.	"If We Could Remember (Reprise)"	3:34
Total length:		49:30

The Sum of All Fears (Music from the Motion Picture): La-La Land: added material in bold
No.	Title	Length
1.	"The Mission"	5:56
2.	"**Do It!**/**I'll Go**/The Bomb"	4:35
3.	"**14 Months**/The Deal"	4:05
4.	"**Thanks a Lot**/That Went Well"	3:22
5.	"**The Shipment/Moscow Time**"	1:16
6.	"**Nice Going/The Docks**"	3:36
7.	"**Mrs. Spassky/The Lab**"	2:10
8.	"**The Reservoir**/**Night Landing**/Deserted Lab"	3:34
9.	"**Shoot Him**/Changes"	3:16
10.	"**Clear the Stadium (film version)/Not the Russians/Man Your Aircraft**"	4:24
11.	"**Further Aggressions/State of War**"	2:53
12.	"**Supplies/To the Docks**"	2:02
13.	"Real Time"	2:50
14.	"**Cabot Is Dead**/His Name Is Olson"	2:50
15.	"Snap Count"	2:11
16.	"**Maximum Readiness/Get a Doctor**"	1:57
17.	"How Close?"	6:08
18.	"The Same Air"	3:16
19.	"If We Could Remember"	3:36
20.	"**Star-Spangled Banner**"	1:55
21.	"Nessun Dorma from Turandot"	2:57
22.	"**The Mission (synth choir)**"	4:31
23.	"Clear the Stadium (album version)"	1:31
24.	"**His Name Is Olson (alt. with synth choir)**"	1:50
25.	"**Theme from The Sum of All Fears (synth demo)**"	2:13
Total length:		78:48

== Release ==
While the film was speculated to be released in late 2001, The Sum of All Fears was theatrically released on May 31, 2002. Many media outlets characterized this apparent change in release date to be a delay due to the September 11 attacks. Addressing the release date, director Phil Alden Robinson said, "When I came on board in August 2000, they said, 'This is a Summer-of-2002 picture.'" As the first film released since September 11 to deal so vividly with terrorism, critics believed it to be too alarming to be released nine months after the attacks.

== Home media ==
The Sum of All Fears was released on DVD and VHS on October 29, 2002.

The film debuted on Blu-ray alongside the other three Jack Ryan installments on July 29, 2008.

== Reception ==
=== Critical response ===
The Sum of All Fears received mixed reviews. Rotten Tomatoes reported that 59% of critics gave the film positive reviews and that the average rating was 5.90/10 based on a total of 176 reviews counted. The consensus was that the film was "A slick and well-made thriller that takes on new weight due to the current political climate." At Metacritic, which assigns a weighted average out of 100 to critics' reviews, The Sum of All Fears received a score of 45 based on 35 reviews. Audiences polled by CinemaScore gave the film an average grade of "A−" on an A+ to F scale.

Peter Travers criticized Affleck's performance, saying it "merely creates an outline for a role he still needs to grow into, a role that Harrison Ford effortlessly filled with authority." Richard Roeper felt the film "is almost impossible to follow – and there's something cringe-inducing about seeing an American football stadium nuked as pop entertainment." Michael Wilmington of the Chicago Tribune called it "an implausible apocalypse without depth or resonance", while Peter Rainer of New York magazine felt the "movie has been upstaged by the sum of our fears."

"There are some frightening special effects in the movie, which I will not describe, because their unexpected appearance has such an effect."

— Roger Ebert, writing for the Chicago Sun-Times

A few positive reviews came from The Argus, who praised Freeman for giving "the William Cabot character such validity." Roger Ebert awarded the film 3.5 out of 4, stars and felt that "the use of the neo-Nazis is politically correct: Best to invent villains who won't offend any audiences. This movie can play in Syria, Saudi Arabia and Iraq without getting walkouts." On the other hand, Ebert found weaknesses in the character of Jack Ryan, whose "one-man actions in post-bomb Baltimore" were "unlikely and way too well-timed". Other reviewers disparaged the recasting of the novel's Arab terrorist villains as Neo-Nazis.

In Reel Power: Hollywood Cinema and American Supremacy, author Matthew Alford observed that the American political characters in the film act benevolently, declaring "When the President and his advisers do apply force it is with heavy hearts and purely as a way of demonstrating 'deterrence' in the hope that this will encourage the Russians to back down. They never apply excessive violence and are ultimately successful — with Ryan's help — in avoiding nuclear warfare." Furthermore, he argued that "the film celebrates and makes light of the enormous covert powers of a globally operating US national security state and its allies."

Ed Gonzalez of Slant magazine took issue with the film's violent content, especially as it was released not long after the September 11 terrorist attacks in the US.

=== Box office ===
The Sum of All Fears made $31.1 million during its opening weekend, ranking in first place at the box office, beating Star Wars: Episode II – Attack of the Clones, Spider-Man and Undercover Brother. It then made $19.2 million in its second weekend, outgrossing Divine Secrets of the Ya-Ya Sisterhood and Bad Company in the process. According to Box Office Mojo, the film made $118,907,036 domestically and $75,014,336 in foreign totals, easily recovering its $68 million production costs.

== Accolades ==
The film won a Visual Effects Society Award for "Best Supporting Visual Effects in a Motion Picture." The recipients were Glenn Neufeld, Derek Spears, Dan Malvin, and Al DiSarro.

== See also ==
- 2002 in film
- The Sum of All Fears (video game)
- National Response Scenario Number One
- The Peacemaker (1997 film), a movie with similar themes.
