= Jack Ryan: Shadow Recruit =

2014 American action thriller film

- Theatrical release poster
- Directed by: Kenneth Branagh
- Written by: Adam Cozad; David Koepp
- Based on: Characters created by Tom Clancy
- Produced by: Mace Neufeld; Lorenzo di Bonaventura; David Barron; Mark Vahradian
- Starring: Chris Pine; Kevin Costner; Kenneth Branagh; Keira Knightley
- Cinematography: Haris Zambarloukos
- Edited by: Martin Walsh
- Music by: Patrick Doyle
- Production companies: Paramount Pictures; Skydance Media; di Bonaventura Pictures; Mace Neufeld Productions
- Distributed by: Paramount Pictures
- Release date: January 17, 2014 (United States)
- Running time: 105 minutes
- Country: United States
- Language: English
- Budget: $60 million
- Box office: $135.5 million

Jack Ryan: Shadow Recruit is a 2014 American action thriller film based on the character Jack Ryan created by author Tom Clancy. It is the fifth film in the Jack Ryan series and the second reboot thereof. Unlike its predecessors, it is not an adaptation of a particular Clancy novel, but rather an original story. Chris Pine stars in the title role, becoming the fourth actor to play Ryan, following Alec Baldwin, Harrison Ford, and Ben Affleck. The film is directed by Kenneth Branagh, who also stars alongside Kevin Costner, and Keira Knightley.

The original screenplay was written by Adam Cozad and David Koepp. The film was produced by Mace Neufeld, Lorenzo di Bonaventura, David Barron and Mark Vahradian, with David Ellison, Dana Goldberg, Paul Schwake and Tommy Harper as executive producers. The film score was composed by Patrick Doyle.

The film was released in the United States on January 17, 2014. It grossed over $130 million and was met with mixed critical reviews. It is dedicated to Clancy, who died on October 1, 2013.

== Plot ==
After the September 11 attacks, Jack Ryan, studying at the London School of Economics, becomes a U.S. Marine officer serving in Afghanistan, until his spine is critically injured while saving two of his fellow Marines when his helicopter is shot down. During a lengthy recovery back in the United States, he meets Cathy Muller, a medical student helping him to recover. Later, Thomas Harper, a veteran CIA official, recruits Jack.

Ten years later, Ryan is working on Wall Street covertly for the CIA looking for suspicious financial transactions that indicate terrorist activity, while Muller is now his fiancée. When Russia loses a key vote before the United Nations and the markets do not respond as expected, Ryan discovers that billions of dollars possessed by Russian business interests, most of which belong directly or indirectly to Russian oligarch Viktor Cherevin, have disappeared.

Ryan's employer conducts business with one of Cherevin's businesses. When Ryan finds certain accounts inaccessible to him as an auditor, he uses it as a legitimate excuse to visit Moscow and investigate. After narrowly surviving an attempt on his life by an assassin posing as his bodyguard, Ryan contacts the CIA and is surprised that his backup is Harper. During their debrief at Staraya Square, Ryan explains how Cherevin's web of international investments makes the United States vulnerable to complete financial collapse following a staged terrorist attack.

The next day, Ryan is met by Katya, who escorts him to Cherevin's office. At their meeting, he is told that the problem company and all its assets have just been sold, preventing an audit. Meanwhile, Muller suspects that Ryan is having an affair and flies to Moscow. Against protocol for unmarried couples, Ryan reveals his CIA employment to her. Improvising the situation, Harper convinces Muller to help them infiltrate Cherevin's offices. Ryan and Muller meet Cherevin at an upscale restaurant across the street from the office. Ryan, who supposedly had too much to drink already before dinner, acts boorish and Muller suggests he "take a walk." Having obtained Cherevin's access card, Ryan enters an office adjacent to Cherevin's, where he downloads crucial files from the computer, while Muller remains with Cherevin distracting him with a variety of topics, including his terminal cirrhosis symptoms.

The suspicious computer activity is detected, and guards rush through the building to locate the intruder. Katya is alerted to find Cherevin, who in a rage takes Muller out of the restaurant to return to his office. On the street, they run into Ryan, who apologizes for his behavior and leaves with Muller. Cheverin's men locate and invade the CIA group's base and kidnap Muller; enraged, Ryan follows and rescues her.

Ryan and the CIA discover Cherevin has secretly propped up the struggling Chinese and Japanese state economies for years, leaving the U.S. economy vulnerable, as well as using a falsified death certificate to place his son, Aleksandr, in the U.S. as a sleeper agent. Ryan uses his talent for pattern recognition to determine that Aleksandr will execute a terrorist attack on Wall Street. Returning to New York City, he locates and catches up to a fake police response vehicle driven by Aleksandr, and discovers a bomb inside the vehicle. Unable to defuse it, he hijacks the vehicle and crashes it into the East River while jumping out; the bomb detonates, killing Aleksandr. Cherevin's fellow conspirators kill him to cover their tracks. Afterward, Ryan, now married, and Harper are called to the White House to brief the President on their next move.

== Cast ==
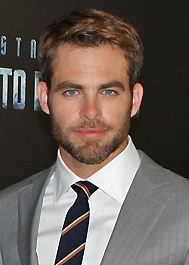
Chris Pine became the fourth actor to assume the role of Jack Ryan, following Alec Baldwin, Harrison Ford and Ben Affleck.

- Chris Pine as Jack Ryan
- Keira Knightley as Dr. Catherine "Cathy" Muller
- Kevin Costner as Thomas Harper
- Kenneth Branagh as Viktor Cherevin
- Lenn Kudrjawizki as Konstantin
- Alec Utgoff as Aleksandr Borovsky
- Elena Velikanova as Katya
- Peter Andersson as Dimitri Lemkov
- Nonso Anozie as Embee Deng
- Colm Feore as Rob Behringer. Feore also appeared in The Sum of All Fears, as a supporting character, Olson.
- Gemma Chan as Amy Chang
- David Paymer as Dixon Lewis
- Karen David as FBI Lead Agent
- Eric Michels as FBI Operative
- John Schwab as New York DWP Worker

Mikhail Baryshnikov makes an uncredited appearance as Interior Minister Sergey Sorokin

== Production ==
=== Development ===
After the financial success of their film The Sum of All Fears (2002), Paramount Pictures made attempts to continue the Jack Ryan film series, but nothing came to fruition. According to Mace Neufeld, Ben Affleck was not hired to reprise his role in future films after his involvement with the box office flop Gigli, stalling the series as the producers failed to recast the role. In 2008, the company engaged director Sam Raimi to spearhead a revival of the series, but he later dropped out due to focus on the development of the ultimately unproduced Spider-Man 4.

In October 2009, Paramount and co-financier Skydance Productions were negotiating with actor Chris Pine to portray Jack Ryan in a film based on Tom Clancy's character, but not on any of the books. At the time, producers Mace Neufeld and Lorenzo di Bonaventura were working with an original concept drafted by Hossein Amini, with David Ready serving as co-producer for di Bonaventura. In August 2010, director Jack Bender was the frontrunner to direct the film, based on a script tentatively titled Moscow by Adam Cozad. The following month, writer Anthony Peckham was brought on to perform rewrites, and later Steve Zaillian, who wrote the screenplay for Clear and Present Danger (1994), was engaged to perform rewrites as well. However, Zaillian withdrew after a few weeks and the film was put on hold by Paramount for Pine to reprise his role as James T. Kirk in Star Trek Into Darkness. During this time, David Koepp was brought on to rewrite the script, with shooting scheduled to begin in the second half of 2012.

The film faced another setback in March 2012, when director Bender dropped out due to scheduling conflicts. Paramount and Skydance Pictures quickly hired Kenneth Branagh to replace him, in order to start production after Pine was finished with Into Darkness around September 2012. "This script arrived and was un-put-down-able and I knew the previous films, I'd read some of the books and, simple as that, it came out of the blue", said Branagh. "I was going to be making another movie, but it went away and this one came to me and I read it and responded very strongly and it's the kind of the film that I go to see".

=== Filming ===
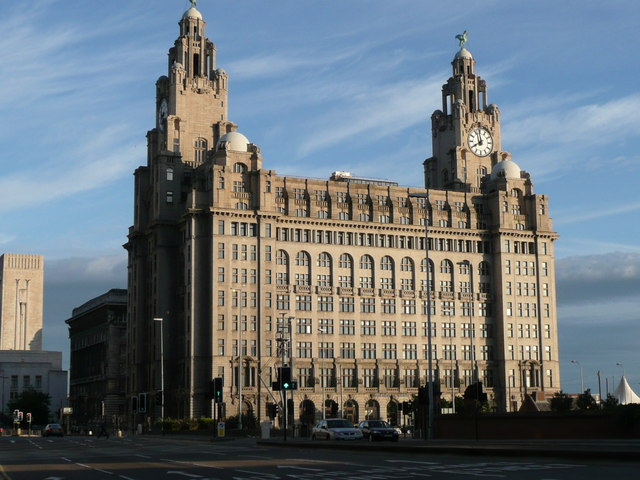
A number of scenes were filmed outside the Royal Liver Building in Liverpool, England.

Pre-production for Jack Ryan: Shadow Recruit took place at the production offices of August Street Films Limited, based at Pinewood Studios in Buckinghamshire. Months after signing on as director, Kenneth Branagh also made a deal with the studio to star as the film's villain.

In early August 2012, Keira Knightley, Felicity Jones, and Evangeline Lilly were being considered for the female lead while Kate Beckinsale and Jessica Biel were approached but declined. Days later, Knightley won the role. That same month, Kevin Costner signed on to play Thomas Harper in a two-picture deal that would have also seen him play the character in a film adaptation of Clancy's Without Remorse.

While images from the film's production in Manhattan surfaced in late August 2012, Paramount Pictures and Skydance Productions did not announce the start of principal photography on Jack Ryan: Shadow Recruit until September 18, 2012. At that time, filming took place in Liverpool city centre, which doubled as Moscow. Filming in New York City had been completed earlier that month. Other shooting locales included London and Moscow. Later, reshoots were also done in New York City.

== Music ==
The musical score of Jack Ryan: Shadow Recruit was composed by Patrick Doyle, who has collaborated on many of Kenneth Branagh's directorial efforts. Writing the score took Doyle up to seven months, which is more than usual. "In Jack Ryan, [Kenneth] wanted a piece of music for this scene and I had the theme the following day for it," said Doyle on his relationship with Branagh. "I actually wrote the main theme of the movie, just sitting there watching it. This is the expectation of a person you're very close to. There's no pressure in that you're so relaxed, especially someone like Kenneth. He brings out the best in you because he creates such a casual, relaxed, but hard-working environment at the same time." A soundtrack album was released digitally by Varèse Sarabande on January 14, 2014, and in physical formats on February 4.

== Release ==
The film was originally scheduled to be released on December 25, 2013, but was pushed back by Paramount Pictures to give the release date to Martin Scorsese's The Wolf of Wall Street. It then was slated for release on January 17, 2014, corresponding with the Martin Luther King Jr. holiday in the United States. In August 2013, Paramount began rolling out a trailer for the film to test audiences bearing the title Jack Ryan: Shadow One. On October 2, 2013, a day after the death of Tom Clancy, the first film poster was released, featuring the new title, Jack Ryan: Shadow Recruit. The first trailer for the film was released the same day. In December 2014, Pine confirmed that there would not be a sequel to the film due to its lackluster box office performance.

The film was later released in Video on Demand format for home media markets on May 20, 2014. It was released on DVD and Blu-ray formats by Paramount Home Entertainment on June 10, 2014.

== Reception ==
=== Box office ===
Jack Ryan: Shadow Recruit earned $5.4 million on its opening day in North American markets. and reached $17.2 million by the end of its opening weekend. The film opened below all previous Jack Ryan films despite a wider theatre count. Based on exit-polling service CinemaScore, more than a third of the film's opening weekend audience was over the age of 50. With only 15 percent of viewers under the age of 25, the film failed to attract younger viewers despite the casting of Chris Pine. The film is the twenty-fourth highest grossing of 2014 and was the first film of the year to have reached over $100 million worldwide. During its theatrical run, the film had grossed $50.6 million domestically and $85 million in foreign business, for a worldwide total of $135.6 million.

=== Critical response ===
On Rotten Tomatoes, the film holds an approval rating of 55% based on 191 reviews, with an average rating of 5.6/10. The website's critics consensus reads: "It doesn't reinvent the action-thriller wheel, but Jack Ryan: Shadow Recruit offers a sleek, reasonably diverting reboot for a long-dormant franchise." Metacritic assigned the film a weighted average score of 57 out of 100, based on 36 critics, indicating "mixed or average" reviews. Audiences polled by CinemaScore gave the film an average grade of "B" on an A+ to F scale.

The film is slow in getting started and once it's underway it's only intermittently involving. It's also occasionally far-fetched. Why is Jack the only person capable of facing the dangerous Cherevin? How does he overpower a hitman built like a refrigerator?

— Claudia Puig, writing for USA Today

Peter Hartlaub of the San Francisco Chronicle gave the film a positive review, saying, "Under taut direction from Kenneth Branagh (who also plays the Russian heavy), Pine is convincing as a character who is pushing papers one day and dodging assassins in Moscow the next." Hartlaub added, "Even with its thrifty set pieces and smaller ambitions, this attempt to reboot the series based on Tom Clancy characters does the most important thing right: It almost always feels like a Jack Ryan movie."

Peter Travers of Rolling Stone was less enthusiastic about the film, saying it "has no personality of its own." Travers added, "It's a product constructed out of spare parts and assembled with computerized precision. It's hard to care when Jack turns operational and becomes a CIA robocop. The movie feels untouched by human hands." Todd McCarthy of The Hollywood Reporter also gave the film a negative review, saying, "While [the film] benefits from an attractive cast, the perennial allure of the spy game and the exoticism of the contemporary Moscow setting, the biggest problem afflicting this modest diversion is that it's the sort of film in which computers get to the bottom of every problem that comes up in about five seconds."
