= Necessary Roughness (film) =

1991 film by Stan Dragoti

- Theatrical release poster
- Directed by: Stan Dragoti
- Written by: Rick Natkin; David Fuller
- Produced by: Mace Neufeld; Robert Rehme
- Starring: Scott Bakula; Robert Loggia; Harley Jane Kozak; Sinbad; Kathy Ireland; Hector Elizondo
- Cinematography: Peter Stein
- Edited by: Steve Mirkovich; John Wright
- Music by: Bill Conti
- Distributed by: Paramount Pictures
- Release date: September 27, 1991
- Running time: 108 minutes
- Language: English
- Budget: $13.5 million
- Box office: $26.3 million (US)

Necessary Roughness is a 1991 American sports comedy film directed by Stan Dragoti. The film stars Scott Bakula, Héctor Elizondo, Robert Loggia, and Harley Jane Kozak. Co-stars include Larry Miller, Sinbad, Jason Bateman, Kathy Ireland, Rob Schneider, and Fred Dalton Thompson.

The film touches on an up-and-coming season at the (then) fictional higher learning institution of Texas State University and its football team nicknamed the Fighting Armadillos. (At the time the film was made, there was no Texas State University, but in 2003, Southwest Texas State University changed its name to Texas State University, nicknamed the Bobcats, which coincidentally was the "season opener" opponent of the fictional Texas State Armadillos.)

The once-powerful Armadillos are forced to start the season with a host of new coaches and players after the previous staff and all but one player, Charlie Banks, are banned following a scandal. This predicament is based on the "death penalty" handed out to the Southern Methodist University football team for violations very similar to the ones found at the fictional Texas State.

== Plot ==
The Texas State University Fighting Armadillos were once one of the most powerful teams in college football. After winning consecutive conference and national championships, massive NCAA violations resulted in the program having to forfeit years' worth of victories. All of the coaches were fired and all of the players are banned from returning and expelled from college except Charlie Banks, the only "clean" player, who never got to play despite having "heart".

This move forces new head coach Ed "Straight Arrow" Gennero to build an almost entirely new team with little assistance. No athletic scholarships are available, forcing them to hold tryouts. Along with this, they must worry about Phillip Elias, the dean of the university, who wants the team to fail so he can scrap it due to the corruption the football program has caused over the years, and funnel the funding into his own pocket. The coaches soon have a makeshift team in place.

Due to Dean Elias declaring many prospective players ineligible because of poor grades, only 17 players are allowed on the team—not enough for separate offensive and defensive squads. The Armadillos are thus forced to play ironman football. The team lacks experience and talent in all areas, especially at quarterback, placekicker, and the defensive line. Assistant coach Wally "Rig" Riggendorf finds Paul Blake, a 34-year-old high school star who never attended college due to his father's death. Rig convinces him to enroll and become the Armadillos' quarterback.

Blake arrives on campus and catches everyone's attention due to his age, especially professor Dr. Suzanna Carter. Blake then recruits a graduate student teaching assistant named Andre Krimm, who is also enrolled at the school and still has some eligibility remaining. Blake convinces him to join, and he is positioned on the defensive line, where he excelled years earlier. Even with the new members, the team is unable to win.

Carter tells Blake that she knows him from 16 years earlier. Carter's ex-boyfriend was a high school football star, but Blake and his team humiliated him and his team in a 1975 championship game. This episode actually caused Carter to become infatuated with Blake. Now, years after the fact, the two begin a romantic relationship which Dean Elias opposes due to their student-teacher dynamic—not to mention Elias' own lascivious interest in Carter.

Coach Rig makes one more recruiting move to secure a kicker. He shocks everybody by selecting Lucy Draper from the school's women's soccer team. When she is brought on board, the team has its first taste of success, as Draper kicks a field goal in a driving rainstorm to forge a 3–3 tie with Kansas. After this game, Blake quits the team after arguments with Gennero and Carter, but convinces himself to come back after a teammate Jarvis Edison, who is also quitting, inadvertently changes his mind and both come back. Dean Elias barges into Carter's office after end-of-term exams, first coming onto her as a distraction from him tampering with the team's grades (to sabotage their eligibility for the final game), but she plays along momentarily before warning him that if one grade changes, she'll report him to University President Carter Purcell.

With the coaches and players now on the same page, the team plays their last game of the season against the number one ranked team in the state of Texas, the University of Texas Colts, with whom the Armadillos were involved in a barroom brawl earlier in the season. They head into the game as huge underdogs, and without Gennero, who is hospitalized just before the game for a potential heart attack, leaving Coach Rig in charge. After a horrible first half, they rally in the second half to cut the deficit to one, and Gennero returns to the sideline, having only suffered from indigestion, though he lets Coach Rig call the final play. Minutes before the final touchdown, after learning about his scheme to get rid of the football program (and his sexual harassment of Carter), Purcell fires Elias, though not before the entire Armadillo defensive line runs him down. The team decides to try to win it all with a two-point conversion. They fake a point after attempt and pass for two. Blake scrambles and finally finds Banks in the end zone to win the game.

== Cast ==
=== Team ===
- Scott Bakula as Paul Blake
- Héctor Elizondo as Coach Ed "Straight Arrow" Gennero
- Robert Loggia as Coach Wally "Rig" Riggendorf
- Sinbad as Andre Krimm
- Jason Bateman as Jarvis Edison
- Andrew Bryniarski as Wyatt Beaudry
- Duane Davis as Featherstone
- Michael Dolan as Eric "Samurai" Hansen
- Marcus Giamatti as Sargie "Fumblina" Wilkinson
- Kathy Ireland as Lucy Draper
- Andrew Lauer as Charlie Banks
- Louis Mandylor as McKenzie
- Peter Tuiasosopo as Laikai "The Slender" Manumana

=== Other ===
- Harley Jane Kozak as Dr. Suzanne Carter
- Larry Miller as Dean Phillip Elias
- Fred Thompson as President Carver Purcell
- Rob Schneider as Chuck Neiderman
- Garrett Schenck as Grant Edison
- Rodger Boyce as Sheriff Woods
- Chris Berman as Himself
- Tom Whitenight as Harlan 'Flat-top' Meyers
- Sidney Karlos Bradford as Sidney 'Doberman' Harris

== Production ==
The film was shot at various locations in Texas. Azle, Dallas, Fort Worth, and Denton were the primary locations used for filming. The University of North Texas in Denton, specifically Fouts Field, which was then UNT's football stadium, was a major location for filming football and college scenes. Texas State's green and white uniforms in the movie are exactly the same colors worn by North Texas. Texas State's helmet logo, a large "T" flanked by a smaller "s" and "u", is a nod to the Texas Southern University Tigers, whose helmet logo is a large "T" flanked by a smaller "s" and "u".

During one scene, when the team takes part in a scrimmage game with a team of convicts, cameos are made by several NFL players. These players included Jerry Rice, Roger Craig, Earl Campbell, Dick Butkus, Ben Davidson, Tony Dorsett, Ed "Too Tall" Jones, Herschel Walker, Jim Kelly, and Randy White. The film also has some cameo appearances from Chris Berman and Evander Holyfield.

== Reception ==
The film was released on September 27, 1991, and went on to gross over $26 million at the box office. The film earned an approval rating of 35% on Rotten Tomatoes based on 31 reviews. The consensus states: "This likable, goofy football comedy has its moments, but it ultimately adheres too closely to the sports movie playbook to overcome the cliches in the script." The film was released in the United Kingdom on March 27, 1992, and failed to reach the Top 10.

The Los Angeles Times called it "a genial, slight, entirely predictable football comedy". Roger Ebert wrote a more positive review, giving the film three out of four stars. Ebert stated that the film is predictable but does not pretend to be anything more than entertainment.

== Legacy ==
Southwest Texas State University, the real team that is the fictional Texas State's first opponent in the film, was renamed Texas State University several years after the film was released. Prior to the renaming a "Texas State University" did not exist. The real Texas State's Bobcats (as opposed to the fictional Fighting Armadillos) now compete at the FBS (Div 1) level, the same level as the fictional Texas State.

== See also ==
- List of American football films
