= Clear and Present Danger (film) =

- Theatrical release poster
- Directed by: Phillip Noyce
- Screenplay by: John Milius; Donald E. Stewart; Steven Zaillian
- Based on: Clear and Present Danger by Tom Clancy
- Produced by: Mace Neufeld; Robert Rehme
- Starring: Harrison Ford; Willem Dafoe; Anne Archer; James Earl Jones
- Cinematography: Donald McAlpine
- Edited by: Neil Travis
- Music by: James Horner
- Production company: Mace Neufeld Productions
- Distributed by: Paramount Pictures
- Release date: August 5, 1994
- Running time: 141 minutes
- Country: United States
- Languages: English; Spanish
- Budget: $62 million
- Box office: $215.9 million

Clear and Present Danger is a 1994 American action thriller film directed by Phillip Noyce and based on Tom Clancy's 1989 novel of the same name. It is a sequel to The Hunt for Red October (1990) and Patriot Games (1992) and part of a series of films featuring Clancy's character Jack Ryan. It is the last film version of Clancy's novels to feature Harrison Ford as Ryan and James Earl Jones as Vice Admiral James Greer, as well as the second of two installments directed by Noyce.

As in the novel, Ryan is appointed CIA Acting Deputy Director (Intelligence) (DDI), and discovers he is being kept in the dark by colleagues who are conducting a covert war against a drug cartel in Colombia, apparently with the approval of the President. The film was released in theaters in the United States on August 5, 1994, by Paramount Pictures, and was a critical and financial success, earning over $215 million worldwide.

== Plot ==
A United States Coast Guard vessel intercepts and boards an American yacht in the Caribbean Sea and finds evidence that the ship's owner and passengers, American businessman Peter Hardin and his family, were murdered by the piloting Colombian crew. CIA analyst Jack Ryan learns that Hardin was laundering money for the South American Cali Cartel, the leader of which, Ernesto Escobedo, ordered Hardin's murder for embezzling millions in drug profits. U.S. President Bennett, Hardin's close friend, discreetly authorizes National Security Advisor James Cutter to initiate covert operations in Colombia to destroy the cartel.

Ryan is appointed acting Deputy Director of Intelligence when Admiral James Greer undergoes treatment for pancreatic cancer. Ryan requests Congress to increase funding to support Colombians fighting the drug cartels, giving his assurance there is no U.S. military involvement, unaware that Cutter will use the funds to assemble RECIPROCITY, a special forces team recruited by CIA operative John Clark and aided by Robert Ritter, the CIA Deputy Director of Operations. President Bennett sends Ryan to negotiate with the Colombian government to allow the United States to seize Escobedo's assets, including $650 million hidden in off-shore accounts, while Escobedo's intelligence officer, Colonel Félix Cortez, secretly orders the Cartel to ambush Ryan's convoy. Ryan survives the fracas, though several colleagues are killed, including Dan Murray and FBI Director Emile Jacobs. Cortez's identity is ascertained after he murders Jacobs' secretary, Moira, who was an unwitting informant.

Blamed for the attack, Escobedo organizes a meeting with the other Cartel heads. RECIPROCITY discovers this and launches an airstrike on their gathering, though Escobedo and Cortez, en route, barely escape unscathed. Cortez learns Americans were responsible and brokers a deal with Cutter: Cortez will kill Escobedo to assume leadership, then will reduce drug shipments to the U.S. and allow American law enforcement to make regular arrests to influence public opinion on the United States' declared war on drugs. As part of the exchange, Cortez wants the location of RECIPROCITY disclosed to him and all CIA support to RECIPROCITY eliminated. Clark's team is stranded when Cutter accepts Cortez's deal, and are overwhelmed by Cortez's mercenaries in the jungle.

U.S. surveillance monitored Cutter's conversation with Cortez unbeknownst to him and Ryan accesses Ritter's computer to obtain evidence regarding the illegal Colombian operations. Ritter, however, warns Ryan that because he secured funding for the operation, Congress will hold Ryan solely responsible, revealing that he and Cutter have been granted pre-emptive pardons by President Bennett for any wrongdoing. Greer succumbs to his illness and Ryan flies to Bogota after the funeral to seek out Clark, unaware that Cutter and Ritter have led Clark to believe that Ryan betrayed RECIPROCITY. Clark captures Ryan, but teams up with him when he realizes Ritter and Cutter played them both.

Ryan and Clark procure a helicopter and fly to RECIPROCITY's last known position, where they find team sniper Chavez, who reports that most of the other team members were killed, and learn Captain Ramirez and one remaining squad member were captured. Ryan meets with Escobedo and informs him of Cortez's deception, while Clark simultaneously commences the rescue of his men who are being held captive in a coffee facility fronting Escobedo's cocaine operation. Escobedo confronts Cortez but is killed by Cortez's associate. Chavez kills Cortez during the escape, and Ryan narrowly escapes along with Clark and the freed prisoners.

Back in the United States, Ryan refuses President Bennett's request to help cover up the conspiracy and instead testifies before the House Oversight Committee about the recent events.

== Cast ==
- Harrison Ford as Jack Ryan
- Willem Dafoe as John Clark
- James Earl Jones as Admiral James Greer
- Anne Archer as Cathy Ryan
- Joaquim de Almeida as Félix Cortez
- Henry Czerny as Robert Ritter
- Harris Yulin as James Cutter
- Donald Moffat as President Edward Bennett
- Miguel Sandoval as Ernesto Escobedo
- Benjamin Bratt as Captain Ramírez
- Raymond Cruz as Domingo Chavez
- Dean Jones as CIA Director Judge Moore
- Thora Birch as Sally Ryan
- Ann Magnuson as Moira Wolfson
- Hope Lange as Senator Mayo
- Tom Tammi as Emile Jacobs
- Tim Grimm as Dan Murray
- Belita Moreno as Jean Fowler
- Jorge Luke as Sipo, Cortez's henchman
- Greg Germann as Petey
- Ellen Geer as Rose
- Rex Linn as DC Homicide Detective
- Reg E. Cathey as Sergeant Major
- Clark Gregg as Staff Sergeant
- Colleen Flynn as Coast Guard Captain
- Reed Diamond as Coast Guard Chief
- Patrick Bauchau as Enrique Rojas

== Production ==
=== Development ===
After completing The Hunt for Red October, John McTiernan had wanted to direct an adaptation of Clear and Present Danger, and departed from the production after an early script by John Milius was rejected in favor of Patriot Games. Milius's first draft was more faithful to the original book than the final film, and he later added the sequence where Jack Ryan is ambushed in SUVs. He said that the original ending had Cortez going to Washington to kill the National Security Advisor, only to be killed in a mugging by drug addicts. After Clancy's dissatisfaction with Patriot Games, he was reluctant to allow any further adaptations of his material, but acquiesced after negotiations with Paramount Pictures and a large financial deal. In March 1992, Donald E. Stewart was hired to rewrite Milius's script to provide greater screen time to Jack Ryan. After Clancy openly criticized the script, Steven Zaillian rewrote it further in an attempt to gain his approval. Milius was retained during production to provide consultation on the action scenes.

The Pentagon had issues with the script and in order to get approval for the use of military equipment, the script was rewritten. In a letter to the producer, Max Neufeld, the Pentagon explained that it was unhappy with “very negative portrayals of the U.S. President and his national security advisor; U.S. military combat forces conducting illegal, covert operations in Colombia; very negative portrayal of Colombia".

=== Production ===
The film was shot in Mexico after the studio decided that filming on-location in Colombia was too dangerous, with Mexico City standing in for Bogotá and the Hacienda San Gabriel de la Palmas in Cuernavaca serving as a set for Escobedo's headquarters. Ironically, the decision to produce the film in Mexico encountered further difficulties due to the outbreak of the Chiapas conflict. The film ran drastically behind schedule and over budget, and part of the footage shot in the United States was destroyed due to the 1994 Northridge earthquake. After negative results from test screenings, parts of the film were reshot using scenes written by Stewart and Zaillian.

=== Music ===
Clear and Present Danger - Music from the Original Motion Picture Soundtrack

Film score by James Horner
- Released: August 2, 1994
- Length: 50:35
- Label: Milan Records

The film's musical score was composed by James Horner. Milan Records released an album featuring selections from the score on August 2, 1994.

== Reception ==
=== Critical response ===
The film received positive reviews from critics. Rotten Tomatoes gives it a rating of 81% based on reviews from 47 critics, with an average score of 7/10. The site's consensus states: "Perfecting the formula established in earlier installments, Clear and Present Danger reunites its predecessor's creative core to solidly entertaining effect." At Metacritic, which assigns a weighted average out of 100 to critics' reviews, Clear and Present Danger received a score of 74 based on 14 reviews. Audiences polled by CinemaScore gave the film an average grade of "A" on an A+ to F scale.

Noyce, who also directed "Patriot Games," manages to keep the complex story lines from snarling even though he relies heavily on crosscutting. The technique, which he uses ingeniously here, enlivens scenes that are technologically driven and potentially deadly.

— Rita Kempley, writing for The Washington Post

Mick LaSalle, writing for the San Francisco Chronicle, commented how it "delights in an almost boyish way in the trappings of power: rocket launchers and high-tech missiles, flags, ceremony and political double-speak." James Berardinelli, who wrote for ReelViews, remarked, "Clear and Present Danger is all plot and no characters. The people running around on screen have about as much depth as the sheen of sweat on Harrison Ford's forehead. Jack Ryan is the most disappointing of all. He's disgustingly virtuous: a flawless fighter for good and justice, a Superman without the cape. I spent half the movie wondering if this guy was ever going to show anything to mark him as vaguely human." In Reel Power: Hollywood Cinema and American Supremacy, author Matthew Alford formulated a critique of the film, pointing out that supporting characters like Cutter and Ritter are pointedly squeamish about the use of force. He queried, "Where is this abundance of sensitivity from the US national security apparatus towards the people of Latin America in the real world?" He concluded, "The answers are all too obvious, except to a Hollywood hooked on schmaltz, willfully ignorant of reality and in thrall to power."

=== Box office ===
Clear and Present Danger opened strongly at the U.S. box office, grossing $20,348,017 in its first weekend, reaching the number one spot ahead of The Mask, Forrest Gump and The Little Rascals. It went on to gross $122 million in the U.S. and Canada, and $94 million in foreign revenue for a worldwide total of $216 million. The film grossed $15 million in Japan, $9 million in the United Kingdom, $7 million in both France and Germany and $5 million in Australia.

=== Year-end lists ===
- 8th – Kenneth Turan, Los Angeles Times
- Honorable mention – Glenn Lovell, San Jose Mercury News
- Honorable mention – John Hurley, Staten Island Advance
- Honorable mention – David Elliott, The San Diego Union-Tribune
- Honorable mention – Michael Mills, The Palm Beach Post
- Honorable mention – Dan Craft, The Pantagraph
- Honorable mention – Bob Carlton, The Birmingham News

=== Accolades ===
The film was nominated for two Academy Awards for Best Sound (Donald O. Mitchell, Michael Herbick, Frank A. Montaño and Art Rochester) and Best Sound Effects Editing (John Leveque and Bruce Stambler), but lost both awards to Speed.

== See also ==
- 1994 in film
