= Escape: Human Cargo =

- Home video cover art
- Genre: Action; Drama
- Based on: "Flight from Dhahran" by John McDonald
- Screenplay by: William Mickelberry; Dan Vining
- Directed by: Simon Wincer
- Starring: Treat Williams; Stephen Lang; Sasson Gabai
- Music by: Eric Colvin
- Country of origin: United States
- Original language: English

Production
- Executive producers: Robert Rehme; Mace Neufeld
- Producers: Nick Grillo; Anne E. Curry; David Franco
- Cinematography: David Burr
- Editor: Terry Blythe
- Running time: 107 minutes
- Production company: Neufeld Rehme Productions

Original release
- Network: Showtime
- Release: March 22, 1998

Escape: Human Cargo is a 1998 American action television film, directed by Simon Wincer. The film was based upon the autobiography Flight from Dhahran by John McDonald In 1999, the film was nominated at the Motion Picture Sound Editors for the Golden Reel Award in the Best Sound Editing - Television movies category. It lost to A Soldier's Sweetheart.

== Plot ==
John McDonald, an American prefabricated housing entrepreneur, is working on a business deal in Saudi Arabia. The business deal goes awry and he's soon arrested by his business partner and made a virtual hostage within the Kingdom and does not receive any help from the U.S. Embassy as they have a noninterference policy with the Saudi government. Fearing for the worst, McDonald crafts a plot to smuggle himself out in a wooden cargo box.

== Cast ==
- Treat Williams as John McDonald
- Stephen Lang as Dennis McNatt
- Sasson Gabai as Suliman Nasir Rasi
- Ze'ev Revach as Sheik Abdulla Fazza
- Rinan Haim as Sam "Silent Sam"
- Uri Gavriel as Khalid
