= Patriot Games (film) =

1992 film by Phillip Noyce

- Theatrical release poster
- Directed by: Phillip Noyce
- Screenplay by: W. Peter Iliff; Donald E. Stewart
- Based on: Patriot Games by Tom Clancy
- Produced by: Mace Neufeld; Robert Rehme
- Starring: Harrison Ford; Anne Archer; Patrick Bergin; Sean Bean; Thora Birch; James Fox; Samuel L. Jackson; James Earl Jones; Richard Harris
- Cinematography: Donald McAlpine
- Edited by: William Hoy; Neil Travis
- Music by: James Horner
- Production company: Mace Neufeld Productions
- Distributed by: Paramount Pictures
- Release date: June 5, 1992 (United States)
- Running time: 117 minutes
- Country: United States
- Language: English
- Budget: $45 million
- Box office: $178.1 million

Patriot Games is a 1992 American action thriller film directed by Phillip Noyce and based on Tom Clancy's 1987 novel of the same name. It is a sequel to the 1990 film The Hunt for Red October, part of a series of films featuring Clancy's character Jack Ryan, but with different actors in the leading roles. Harrison Ford stars as Jack Ryan and Anne Archer as his wife, and James Earl Jones reprises his role as Admiral James Greer. The cast also includes Sean Bean, Patrick Bergin, Thora Birch, Samuel L. Jackson, James Fox, and Richard Harris.

During production, Clancy repeatedly voiced his displeasure with his understanding of the script, in particular details of technical items to be shown onscreen and the 49-year-old Ford conflicting with his vision of Jack Ryan's age, but publicly stated his satisfaction once he actually saw a cut of the film a few weeks before it was released.

The film premiered in theaters in the United States on June 5, 1992, released by Paramount Pictures, and spent two weeks as the No. 1 film, grossing $178.1 million worldwide at the box office. It received a generally positive reception from critics. It was followed by Clear and Present Danger (1994), with Ford, Archer, Jones and Birch reprising their roles.

== Plot ==
Former CIA analyst Jack Ryan now teaches history at the United States Naval Academy. In London with his wife Cathy and their young daughter Sally, Ryan witnesses and intervenes in a terrorist kidnapping attempt on Lord William Holmes, the British Minister of State for Northern Ireland and a cousin to the Queen Mother. Ryan is wounded but disarms one terrorist and fatally shoots two others, then subdues Sean Miller. Among those killed is Miller's younger brother. All belong to a radical IRA splinter cell led by Kevin O'Donnell. Shortly after the incident, IRA operatives attempt and fail to assassinate O'Donnell, considering him and his followers too radical.

Miller is tried and convicted for his efforts. As he is being transported to prison, O'Donnell and his team ambush the police convoy, killing the guards and freeing Miller. Retreating to North Africa, O'Donnell plans the next attempt on Lord Holmes. Miller vows to avenge his brother's death, and O'Donnell allows him, O'Donnell's lover Annette, and several squadmates to travel to the US to assassinate Ryan. Meanwhile, British police have determined that an informant has been tipping off the terrorists and are surveilling Dennis Cooley, a book shop owner, who is an IRA operative.

Back in Maryland, Ryan is informed first that Cathy is pregnant again, and then about Miller's escape. He brushes off the bad news, figuring a wanted fugitive would not have the nerve to travel all the way to the United States. Soon after, he narrowly survives an assassination attempt by Miller's accomplices close to the Academy, while Miller simultaneously targets Cathy while she drives home, causing her car to crash, seriously injuring her and Sally.

Ryan's former CIA superior, Vice Admiral James Greer, asks Ryan to rejoin the agency to help capture the terrorists. While investigating, Ryan recalls seeing a red-headed woman during the attacks on both him and Lord Holmes. Ryan approaches Sinn Féin representative Paddy O'Neil for information. O'Neil denies IRA involvement and denounces the attacks, but refuses to betray any fellow Irishmen. Ryan threatens to sabotage O'Neil's American fundraising efforts by showing images of his hospitalized daughter to the media. O'Neil eventually identifies the female accomplice as an Englishwoman, Annette. Locating her will lead to Miller. Satellite analysis indicates that Miller and O'Donnell are at a terrorist training camp in Libya, along with Annette. Having been revealed as an agent in London, Cooley flees to the training camp and entreats Miller and O'Donnell to join them, even though he has no military skills. Miller kills Cooley on O'Donnell's say-so in order to tie up loose ends. The Special Air Service raid the camp, killing everyone, although Miller, O'Donnell, and their cohort have already fled to America to coincide with Lord Holmes's visit there.

While Lord Holmes is at the Ryan residence to present Ryan's KCVO medal, a severe thunderstorm apparently knocks out the house's power. Ryan notices the boat-house lights are still on, leading him to think the house's power was deliberately cut. He suspects an imminent attack and is unable to radio any DSS agents or state troopers guarding the premises. Ryan realizes that Holmes's assistant, Geoffrey Watkins, is the informant and forces him to reveal information. Outside, O'Donnell, Miller, and their team have killed all of the security personnel, then infiltrate the house. After Ryan and his Naval Academy associate, Lt. Commander Robby Jackson, eliminate several terrorists, Miller pursues Ryan, accidentally killing Watkins in the process. Ryan lures O'Donnell, Miller, and Annette into pursuing him on open water in their waiting speed boats. Upon realizing it is a ruse, O'Donnell demands they return and complete their mission to abduct and ransom Holmes. Miller, crazed with revenge against Ryan, refuses, then kills O'Donnell and Annette. He leaps aboard Ryan's boat where a struggle ensues; Ryan kills Miller on an anchor and jumps overboard just before the burning boat crashes into jutting rocks and explodes. An FBI Hostage Rescue Team arrives, rescuing Ryan.

In the final scene, during breakfast, Cathy's doctor calls saying the yet-to-be born baby is healthy, and asks if she would like to know if it's a boy or a girl. The family decides they want to know and the doctor tells Cathy, who smiles.

== Cast ==
- Harrison Ford as Jack Ryan
- Anne Archer as Cathy Ryan
- Patrick Bergin as Kevin O'Donnell
- Sean Bean as Sean Miller
- Thora Birch as Sally Ryan
- James Fox as Lord Holmes
- Samuel L. Jackson as Robby Jackson
- Polly Walker as Annette
- J. E. Freeman as Marty Cantor
- David Threlfall as Inspector Robert Highland
- Alun Armstrong as Sergeant Jimmy Owens
- James Earl Jones as Admiral James Greer
- Richard Harris as Paddy O'Neil
- Hugh Fraser as Geoffrey Watkins
- Bob Gunton as interviewer
- Alex Norton as Dennis Cooley

== Production ==
=== Development and casting ===
Viacom tried to option the rights for an ABC television adaptation of Patriot Games after the release of the novel in 1987. However, Tom Clancy got into a legal dispute over whether he had retained the rights to the character in his deal for the U.S. Naval Institute to publish the previous novel in the series The Hunt for Red October. In 1988, during the pre-production of the film adaptation of The Hunt for Red October, Paramount Pictures filed a lawsuit claiming that it had purchased the rights to the character of Jack Ryan with its $455,000 contract to adapt The Hunt for Red October and that the ABC adaptation could not move forward. Although Clancy's attorney Robert Yodelman disputed Paramount's claim to full character rights, the lawsuit led to the project's cancellation. After the release of The Hunt for Red October, Paramount Pictures paid $2.5 million for the rights to Patriot Games and Clear and Present Danger.

The actors who played Jack and Caroline Ryan in The Hunt for Red October, Alec Baldwin and Gates McFadden, did not appear in the film. Baldwin was in negotiations to reprise his role, but committed to perform in A Streetcar Named Desire on Broadway after filming on Patriot Games was delayed by two months. In 2011, Baldwin claimed the role was recast due to David Kirkpatrick forcing him to choose between performing in A Streetcar Named Desire or agreeing to an open-ended clause relating to dates for the first sequel. Baldwin further claimed this occurred after a famous actor, widely believed to be the film's eventual star Harrison Ford, offered to play Ryan. Ford was favored by both the studio and the director John McTiernan due to a large debt the studio owed to him from Harold Becker's unproduced action-historical film Night Ride Down, a film set around a Brotherhood of Sleeping Car Porters strike in the 1930s, which was cancelled due to the early 1990s recession. (Note: Attributed to multiple sources:) McTiernan had originally desired Ford in the role in the first film and confirmed that "there was a great deal of scheming that went on to push Alec out of that part." Kirkpatrick responded to Baldwin's claims by saying that negotiations with him to reprise the role had already broken down due to his insistence on script approval. Ford signed a $9 million three-picture contract to play Ryan after Baldwin's departure.

McTiernan initially wanted to follow The Hunt for Red October by directing an adaptation of Clear and Present Danger using a script written by John Milius. After the studio opted to adapt Patriot Games, he declined to direct because of his Irish-American background. Walter Hill, Kevin Reynolds, and John Badham were considered to replace McTiernan. Badham was almost hired but asked for too high a fee, and Phillip Noyce was chosen instead. Donald Stewart returned from the first film to co-write the script with W. Peter Iliff.

In the original novel, the assassination attempt was made on the Prince of Wales and many members of the British royal family appeared as important characters. They were replaced with fictitious characters in the screenplay, with Prince Charles being replaced by Lord Holmes, a nonexistent cousin of Queen Elizabeth The Queen Mother.

=== Filming ===
Shooting began on November 2, 1991. The budget was initially $28 million, but was raised to $40 million by Brandon Tartikoff. The movie was filmed on location in areas around London, at Royal Naval College, Greenwich, and at Pinewood Studios. Scenes were also filmed at the U.S. Naval Academy in Annapolis, Maryland. Jack Ryan's home was filmed on the California coast and made to look like it was in Maryland.

The scenes set at a terrorist camp in Libya were filmed in the desert near Brawley, California. To make the attack on the camp appear as infrared footage, actors wearing black body suits were filmed from a helicopter and the resulting video images were reversed in post-production.

Patriot Games was the first movie to be allowed to film at the George Bush Center for Intelligence, CIA Headquarters.

Filming also took place at Aldwych tube station (closed 1994), which was then only being used for weekday peak hour service, for a sequence later in the film.

Test audiences in April 1992 responded negatively to the original ending, which had Jack Ryan and Sean Miller fighting underwater. The ending was re-shot with a more explosive finale. The reshoots increased the film's production budget to $45 million, and with the marketing budget included, the cost to the studio was $65 million. While reshooting the scene, Harrison Ford accidentally hit Sean Bean with a boat hook; Bean has a scar over his eye as a result.

Before seeing the film, numerous differences between the script and the novel caused Clancy to distance himself from the film production. Clancy was unhappy with details of technical items scripted to be shown onscreen, and complained about the age of then-49-year-old Ford, as compared to the 34-year-old Baldwin, to portray his vision of Ryan. During production he asked for his name to be taken off the film. He complained that the final attack scene was "unrealistic" and that he had not been shown any rushes. He said he was not sure a film of Clear and Present Danger would be made, as the script for Patriot Games meant it "will turn out so bad." However, after meeting with Tartikoff and actually seeing a cut of the film, which did not in fact contain the details that Clancy thought were going to be in the film, Clancy was "impressed with how the movie depicted the CIA's intelligence-gathering process", and stated that he looked forward to working with the studio on the adaptation of Clear and Present Danger.

=== Music ===
Patriot Games: Music From The Original Motion Picture Soundtrack

Film score by James Horner
- Released: June 9, 1992
- Length: 45:10
- Label: RCA Records

On June 9, 1992, the original motion picture soundtrack was released by the RCA Records music label. The film's musical score was composed by James Horner and contains musical references to works by Aram Khachaturian (Adagio from "Gayane" Suite) and Dmitri Shostakovich (Symphony No. 5, 3rd mvt.). A music video is shown in an early scene featuring Clannad's song "Theme from Harry's Game", originally made for an ITV drama about The Troubles in 1982. All other vocal performances featured on the soundtrack were performed by Maggie Boyle.

In 2013, a 2-disc expanded soundtrack album was released by La-La Land Records. Limited to 3000 copies, the album contains over 50 minutes of previously unreleased music (including cues by Wolfgang Amadeus Mozart and John Philip Sousa).

== Reception ==
=== Critical response ===
On the review aggregator website Rotten Tomatoes, 72% of 103 critics' reviews are positive, with an average rating of 6.8/10. The website's consensus reads: "Patriot Games doesn't win many points for verisimilitude, but some entertaining set pieces—and Harrison Ford in the central role—more than compensate for its flaws." Metacritic, which uses a weighted average, assigned the film a score of 67 out of 100, based on 20 critics, indicating "generally favorable" reviews. Audiences polled by CinemaScore gave the film an average score of "A−" on an A+ to F scale.

Roger Ebert called it "absorbing" and commented that Harrison Ford "once again demonstrates what a solid, convincing actor he is". Chris Hicks of the Deseret News mentioned how director Noyce gave the film "flourish and tension" while star Harrison Ford injected "a commanding sense of decency and humanity to the role of CIA analyst Jack Ryan, making it his own."

There was controversy associated with the specifics of a negative review by Joseph McBride, in Variety. McBride, of Irish descent, wrote that it was "fascistic, blatantly anti-Irish", and that the likely opening weekend box office draw of Harrison Ford would quickly be eliminated when "downbeat word-of-mouth spreads like wildfire." In response, the editor-in-chief of Variety, Peter Bart, sent a letter to Martin S. Davis, chairman of Paramount, which—while not apologizing for the review being negative—stated that it was unprofessional for McBride to impose his political opinions into the film review. While some staff at Variety were disapproving of the letter, others confirmed that they were "embarrassed" by McBride including his political views.

=== Box office ===
Patriot Games grossed $83.4 million in the United States and Canada, and $94.7 million in other territories, for a worldwide total of $178.1 million, against a budget of $45 million. It debuted at No. 1 for the weekend of June 5, 1992, repeated in the top spot in its second weekend, and spent its first six weeks in the Top 10 at the box office.
