= CIA activities in Colombia =

Overview of activities conducted by the CIA

The Central Intelligence Agency focuses on fighting two major conflicts, the cultivation and trafficking of cocaine and the local extremist groups in Colombia. The Revolutionary Armed Forces of Colombia (FARC) is one of the main extremist groups in Colombia. The CIA activities revolve heavily around stopping the production of cocaine, and stopping the FARC.

== Background ==
During La Violencia, the CIA dispatched a special survey team to research and document the issue of violence in Colombia. As a result of the survey, the Kennedy Administration established a dual policy of Military and Socioeconomic assistance as part of the broader Alliance for Progress program in Latin America. The Colombian government received 1.5 million dollars' worth of military hardware, including helicopters, to establish a special counterinsurgency air cavalry unit. The CIA also helped establish COIN protocol during this period, including interrogations and other matters of conduct.

== Colombia 1991 ==
As part of transnational counterdrug activity, the CIA financed a military intelligence network in Colombia in 1991. Speaking on behalf of the Deputy Director for Intelligence, David Carey, director of the DCI Crime and Narcotics center, spoke about

- trends in transnational criminal activity
- the impact of crime and corruption on political and economic stability in foreign countries
- expanding international networks and cooperation among criminal organizations.

Carey described that the illicit drug trade could spill over into other areas, including the smuggling of illegal aliens. "Although organized crime groups appear to be only peripherally involved in the gray arms market—which is dominated by freelance brokers, corrupt exporters, and import front companies—conflicts in the Balkans and in the former Soviet Union have encouraged Italian and Russian criminal organizations in particular to expand their involvement in arms trafficking.

"As criminal organizations grow in sophistication and expand their networks, they could become increasingly involved in supporting proliferation and terrorist activities. Their networks and mechanisms for illicit financial deals could also make them greater players in international sanctions violations.

Dr. Bruce Michael Bagley, of the University of Miami, found that US counterdrug policy in Colombia was counterproductive.

This essay examines the impact of U.S. and Colombian government drug control policies on the evolution of drug cultivation, drug trafficking, and political violence in Colombia during the 1990s. Its central thesis is that the Washington/Bogota-backed war on drugs in Colombia over the decade did not merely fail to curb the growth of the Colombian drug trade and attendant corruption, but actually proved counterproductive. Among the most important unintended consequences were the explosion of drug cultivation and production activities, the dispersion and proliferation of organized crime, and the expansion and intensification of political violence and guerrilla warfare in the country. As a result, Colombia at the outset of 2000 faced more serious threats to its national security and political stability than it had in 1990. ... the massive escalation of the flawed anti-drug strategies of the past decade proposed by the Clinton administration in January 2000 is more likely to worsen Colombia’s ongoing problems of spiraling violence and insecurity than to resolve them.

One author, independent journalist Frank Smythe, writing in The Progressive, a journal with a pronounced leftist perspective, alleged that CIA counter-narcotics efforts were linked with covert support for right-wing death squads:

In the name of fighting drugs, the CIA financed new military intelligence networks there in 1991. But the new networks did little to stop drug traffickers. Instead, they incorporated illegal paramilitary groups into their ranks and fostered death squads. These death squads killed trade unionists, peasant leaders, human-rights monitors, journalists, and other suspected "subversives." The evidence, including secret Colombian military documents, suggests that the CIA may be more interested in fighting a leftist resistance movement than in combating drugs.

Colombia, like many Latin American countries, has problems with violent groups on the left and right. "This wasn't a romantic act -- it was a realistic one," said Fernando Cubides, a sociology professor, while applauding the squads' disarmament, doubt that their motives are altruistic "He explained that a series of death-squad leaders had been killed, beginning with the shooting in July of Gonzalo Perez, founder of the so-called civilian self-defense groups. Mr. Perez's son Henry, who became acting leader, was killed two weeks later, and two other sons died in an October attack. The Perez family, with army approval, helped create the organizations in the 1960s and 70's in the Magdalena Valley in central Colombia. In those days they were simple peasant bands, protecting each other from guerrillas who kidnapped land owners."

The Times article continued,"..in the 1980s, drug traffickers began buying huge tracts of land in the region and poured money into these armed groups so that their interests, too, would be safeguarded. The peasant bands turned into private armies...Human rights organizations believe that in their zeal to rid the area of guerrillas and their supporters, these private armies have carried out some of the worst massacres in recent Colombian history.

A Human Rights Watch article from 1994 does speak of very real abuses in Colombia, but does not mention non-Colombian sources.

Most individuals have few defenses against crime. Far from being seen as society's protectors, Colombian police are often viewed as hoodlums. Repeatedly, government investigators and human rights groups have found evidence tying police to crimes and human rights violations.In Bogotá, a study by the mayor's Oficina Permanente de Derechos Humanos (Permanent Human Rights Office) found that one quarter of the complaints they received between March 1993 and March 1994 involved police, implicated in attempted murders, beatings, and illegal searches.

In that HRW article, however, there is no mention of any non-Colombian participation. The article describes a real problem in Colombia, but speaks of the abuses as coming from Colombians, sometimes anonymous, and also speaks of the failure of the Colombian government to control the abuses.

Smyth said,

But the CIA remains a Cold War institution. Many officers, especially within the clandestine operations wing, still see communists behind every door. They maintain warm relationships with rightist military forces worldwide that are engaging in." Later in the article, he gives a disclaimer that In 1994, Amnesty International accused the Pentagon of allowing anti-drug aid to be diverted to counterinsurgency operations that lead to human-rights abuses. U.S. officials including General Barry R. McCaffrey, the Clinton Administration drug czar who was then in charge of the U.S. Southern Command, publicly denied it.But back at the office, McCaffrey ordered an internal audit.

There is a reference to McCaffrey in a rather detailed paper by a University of Miami professor, Bruce Michael Bagley. He introduces his article with

This essay examines the impact of U.S. and Colombian government drug control policies on the evolution of drug cultivation, drug trafficking, and political violence in Colombia during the 1990s. Its central thesis is that the Washington/Bogota-backed war on drugs in Colombia over the decade did not merely fail to curb the growth of the Colombian drug trade and attendant corruption, but actually proved counterproductive. Among the most important unintended consequences were the explosion of drug cultivation and production activities, the dispersion and proliferation of organized crime, and the expansion and intensification of political violence and guerrilla warfare in the country. As a result, Colombia at the outset of 2000 faced more serious threats to its national security and political stability than it had in 1990. The essay concludes that the massive escalation of the flawed anti-drug strategies of the past decade proposed by the Clinton administration in January 2000 is more likely to worsen Colombia’s ongoing problems of spiraling violence and insecurity than to resolve them.

He concludes,

Clearly, Washington’s current strategy towards Colombia fully satisfies neither the hard-liners nor the reformers. In effect, it seeks to straddle the line between them. The drug war remains the formal priority and human rights monitoring a condition of U.S. aid. Yet the bulk of U.S. assistance will be channeled into the Colombian military rather than into socio-economic and institutional reforms. This "two track" strategy may well prove capable of propping up the Colombian political regime at least for the next few years, but it is unlikely to foster either lasting peace or enduring political stability in the coming decade.

Returning to Smyth's article,

It found that thirteen out of fourteen Colombian army units that Amnesty had specifically cited for abuses had previously received either U.S. training or arms.

According to Smyth, Amnesty made these documents public in 1996. There is no reference to them on Amnesty International's site. There was a 1999 annual report about death squads in Colombia, but it did not mention any non-Colombian involvement, other than the UN Commission on Human Rights. "Some of these concerns were addressed in a statement by the Chairman of the Commission which expressed concern about the gravity and scale of human rights violations and breaches of international humanitarian law and, inter alia, urged the government to take steps to end impunity and to take effective action to prevent internal displacement. The Commission welcomed the agreement with the Colombian government to extend the mandate of the office of the un High Commissioner for Human Rights in Colombia until April 1999." The situation described by Amnesty, however, was:

More than 1,000 civilians were killed by the security forces or paramilitary groups operating with their support or acquiescence. Many victims were tortured before being killed. At least 150 people disappeared. Human rights activists were threatened and attacked; at least six were killed. Death squad-style killings continued in urban areas. Several army officers were charged in connection with human rights violations; many others continued to evade accountability. Armed opposition groups were responsible for numerous human rights abuses, including deliberate and arbitrary killings and the taking of hundreds of hostages. Conservative Party candidate Andrés Pastrana Arango was elected President and assumed office in August. He immediately announced his willingness to negotiate with armed opposition groups to end decades of armed conflict. During the presidential campaign both principal armed opposition groups – the Fuerzas Armadas Revolucionarias de Colombia (farc), Revolutionary Armed Forces of Colombia, and the Ejército de Liberación Nacional (eln), National Liberation Army – expressed their willingness to enter into talks with the incoming government.

== Colombia 1999 ==
When the Colombian military seized some rifles in mid-1999, the CIA helped trace them, and found they had been diverted from a Jordanian shipment to Colombia in 1998. That discovery was promptly reported to White House, State Department and Defense officials.

== Colombia 2002 ==
According to a report in the Los Angeles Times, CIA has provided, to US policymakers, reports, not fully confirmed, the head of Colombia's U.S.-backed army, Gen. Mario Montoya Uribe cooperated with right-wing militias that Washington considers terrorist organizations, including a militia headed by one of the country's leading drug traffickers.

The article says "Disclosure of the allegation about army chief comes as the high level of U.S. support for Colombia's government is under scrutiny by Democrats in Congress." Colombia is the third-largest recipient of US foreign aid, and, if the allegations are established, it could heighten pressure to reduce or redirect that aid because Montoya has been a favorite of the Pentagon and an important partner in the U.S.-funded counterinsurgency strategy called Plan Colombia.

According to the CIA document provided to the reporters, from an anonymous source an allied Western intelligence agency reported the existence of such links during a 2002 Medellín offensive carried out against the Revolutionary Armed Forces of Colombia (Spanish: Fuerzas Armadas Revolucionarias de Colombia) (FARC) under the title of "Operation Orion".

While the operation was considered a success, there were allegations that over 40 people had disappeared during the operation and that the impending power vacuum was filled by paramilitary forces. The Western intelligence agency mentioned in the report considered that, the source of the claim was yet-unproven. A Defense attaché to the United States Embassy in Bogotá told the Los Angeles Times that "this report confirms information provided by a proven source."

General Mario Montoya was commander of the area police force during the operation. The report cites an informant who claimed that plans for the attack were signed by General Montoya and paramilitary leader Fabio Jaramillo, who was a subordinate of Diego Fernando Murillo Bejarano, also known as Don Berna. Don Berna became known for taking over the drug trade around Medellín after drug kingpin Pablo Escobar was killed.

President of Colombia, Álvaro Uribe (no relation to Montoya Uribe), has denied any links between his government and paramilitary forces.

== Colombia 2003 ==
Colombian army troops search for three United States Department of Defense contractors who are abducted by the FARC, who were captured after crash-landing a Cessna airplane in the Colombian countryside. FARC describes these individuals as "gringo CIA agents".

== Colombia 2005 ==
=== Intelligence analysis ===
As part of testimony to the Senate Intelligence Committee in early 2005, Porter Goss mentioned that extremist groups in Colombia, with FARC heading the list, were of concern to the US. Pointing out that there would be an election in 2006, he warned that "progress against counternarcotics and terrorism under President Uribe's successful leadership, may be affected by the election."

== Colombia 2007 ==
Reports on the 2002 event were not associated with the CIA, so it would appear that the funding does not come directly from the CIA, but from State or Defense. On April 16, according to HRW, Secretary of State Condoleezza Rice certified that the Colombian government and armed forces are making progress on human rights. Until allegations of Montoya's possible collaboration are neither confirmed or denied, although several organizations recommend that the US Congress should maintain a hold on military assistance to Colombia until alleged links between paramilitary groups and state officials are thoroughly investigated, Amnesty International USA, the Center for International Policy, Human Rights Watch, the US Office on Colombia and the Washington Office on Latin America.

On April 16, the US Congress put a hold on the remaining fiscal year 2006 funding to the Colombian Armed Forces. Congress has apparently placed the remaining funding of $55.2 million on hold out of concern about alleged links between the head of the Colombian Army and the rightist paramilitary group known as United Self-Defense Forces of Colombia (AUC), a US-designated foreign terrorist organization. Its major opponents, also on the US list of terrorist organizations, are the leftist FARC and ELN.

== Colombia 2008 ==
Hostages held by FARC, including possible CIA contractors, are rescued by the Colombian Army on July 2, 2008.
