= The Hunt for Red October (console game) =

1991 video game

- Developers: Beam Software (NES & Game Boy); Riedel Software Productions (SNES)
- Publisher: Hi-Tech Expressions, Inc.
- Designer: Andrew Davie
- Composers: Tania Smith, Gavan Anderson (Game Boy / NES); John Spence (SNES)
- Platforms: NES, Game Boy, SNES
- Release: NES: NA: January 1991; EU: 1991; Game Boy: NA: May 1991; JP: April 28, 1992; EU: June 11, 1992; SNES: NA: January 1993; JP: October 1, 1993; EU: 1993
- Genre: Side scroller
- Mode: Single-player

The Hunt for Red October is a video game based on the 1990 film The Hunt for Red October. It was first released in 1991 for the Nintendo Entertainment System. Versions for the Game Boy and Super NES were subsequently released.

== Gameplay ==
Screenshot from the NES version.

The game features deep sea combat, side-scrolling action, and cinematic sequences. The object is to evade destruction and eliminate saboteurs. The caterpillar drive is particularly useful for quietly escaping the enemy.

The Super NES version is one of 11 games that uses the Super Scope accessory, though it is only used to play bonus stages that put the submarine in first person view, where the player has to destroy a number of enemies and projectiles. The use of the Super Scope is optional.

The NES version has an exclusive level: the final stage changes to platform-style gameplay. The player, as Ramius, must find and disable bombs Soviet-loyal crewmembers have set in the weapons bay of the Red October.

The Game Boy version offers the option to play as Ramius or the convoy commander of the Soviet Navy. It has eight stages, beginning in Greenland and ending on the Western Seaboard of the United States. The fifth stage shows Greek architecture, an Easter egg where the lost city of Atlantis has been unknowingly discovered. As the convoy commander, the player's mission is to sink the Red October, sparing no expense. As Ramius, the player's mission is to make it to the United States. As such, the game had two different endings, as well as two losing endings. If the Red October ran into too many traps, a losing scene would be shown of a torpedo making a direct hit on the submarine and saying "Game over; Red October". If Ramius successfully evaded all assaults, a scene would be shown of the Red October firing a torpedo and saying "Game over; Convoy Commander".

== Reception ==
Reception

Review scores
Publication	Score
Nintendo Power	NES: 10.9/20
Player One	GB: 20%
Raze	GB: 67/100
Total!	NES: 32%
Video Games (DE)	NES: 65%
