= Mace Neufeld =

American film and television producer (1928–2022)

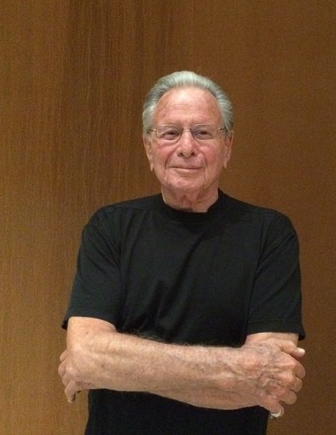
- Born: Morris Alvin Neufeld; July 13, 1928; New York City, New York, U.S.
- Died: January 21, 2022 (aged 93); Beverly Hills, California, U.S.
- Education: Stuyvesant High School, Yale University, B.A.
- Occupations: Film and television producer
- Spouses: Helen Katz (m. 1954; died 1995): Diane Conn
- Children: Bradley David Neufeld; Glenn Jeremy Neufeld; Nancy Ann Neufeld
- Parent(s): Margaret Ruth (née Braun); Philip M. Neufeld

Morris "Mace" Alvin Neufeld (July 13, 1928 – January 21, 2022) was an American film and television producer. Born in New York City, Neufeld began working in the entertainment industry as a songwriter and production assistant in the late 1940s and then as a talent agent, managing comics, actors, musicians and writers, including Don Adams, Don Knotts, Neil Diamond, and the Carpenters. He began producing for television in the 1970s and in 1981 was nominated for a Primetime Emmy for the TV movie East of Eden.

Described by the Los Angeles Times as "a prolific producer with old-school Hollywood charm and a Renaissance-man résumé", Neufeld's first feature film production was the successful horror film The Omen in 1976, starring Gregory Peck and Lee Remick. Three successful sequels followed. In the 1990s and early 2000s, Neufeld produced several screen adaptations of works by author Tom Clancy, beginning with The Hunt for Red October starring Sean Connery and Alec Baldwin and continuing with Patriot Games, Clear and Present Danger and The Sum of All Fears. Film productions in the 2000s included Sahara and Invictus, and in the 2010s, The Equalizer, The Equalizer 2 and the Tom Clancy's Jack Ryan series for Amazon.

During his life, Neufeld was honored with lifetime achievement awards from the Israel Film Festival and the Palm Springs Film Festival, as well as a star on the Hollywood Walk of Fame.

== Early life ==
Neufeld was born July 13, 1928, in New York City, New York, the son of Margaret Ruth (née Braun) and Philip M. Neufeld, a stockbroker.

In 1944, during his senior year at New York's Stuyvesant High School, he snapped a photo of an American soldier on crutches emerging from a taxi to greet his parents upon returning from World War II. The New York Daily News bought the photo and devoted a full page to it. The photo became a finalist for that year's Pulitzer Prize. As a result, Neufeld was offered photography scholarships at the University of Ohio and at USC. He chose instead to enroll at Yale University, where his classmates included George H. W. Bush. After graduation, Neufeld went to work as a production assistant at the DuMont Television Network. He also composed music, writing songs for Sammy Davis Jr., the Ritz Brothers, and Rosemary Clooney.

== Career ==
In the 1950s, Neufeld became a talent agent and managed Don Knotts, Don Adams, Randy Newman, Neil Diamond, Jim Croce and Jay Ward. Neufeld entered television series production in the late 1970s. His productions of the time included the variety show The Captain and Tennille, which ran from 1976 to 1977 on ABC, The Kids from C.A.P.E.R., which ran from 1976 through 1977 on CBS, and Quark, which ran for one year in 1978 on NBC. He also became a film producer, beginning with The Omen in 1976, along with its sequels. Neufeld next produced the TV movie Angel on My Shoulder on ABC in 1980, as well as the features The Frisco Kid (the first of several film projects with Harrison Ford) in 1979, The Funhouse in 1981, and Transylvania 6-5000 in 1985. Neufeld's small screen work continued, including a 1981 family drama American Dream and the fantasy of The Magic Planet (both on ABC), as well as White Hot: The Mysterious Murder of Thelma Todd on NBC and the adventure of Lightning Force, a syndicated series, from 1991 to 1992.

His production company, with mogul Marvin Davis, was followed by one set up with Robert Rehme, which arranged an exclusive production deal with Paramount. Launching their partnership in the early 1990s, the team went on to shepherd Patriot Games and Clear and Present Danger, based on the bestselling books of Tom Clancy. They also produced 1991's Flight of the Intruder. Neufeld had earlier produced Clancy's The Hunt for Red October with Jerry Sherlock. When Rehme exited the partnership to become President of the Academy of Motion Picture Arts and Sciences, Neufeld went on to produce yet another Tom Clancy adaptation starring Ben Affleck, The Sum of All Fears, as well as Bless the Child, Lost in Space and Asylum.

Neufeld was a producer on Sahara, released in 2005, and on Invictus, directed by Clint Eastwood, starring Morgan Freeman and Matt Damon. Neufeld produced Jack Ryan: Shadow Recruit, starring Chris Pine, and Tom Clancy's Jack Ryan, starring John Krasinski, as well as The Equalizer and The Equalizer 2, both starring Denzel Washington. Neufeld was given the Lifetime Achievement Award at the 2014 Israel Film Festival.

== Personal life and death ==
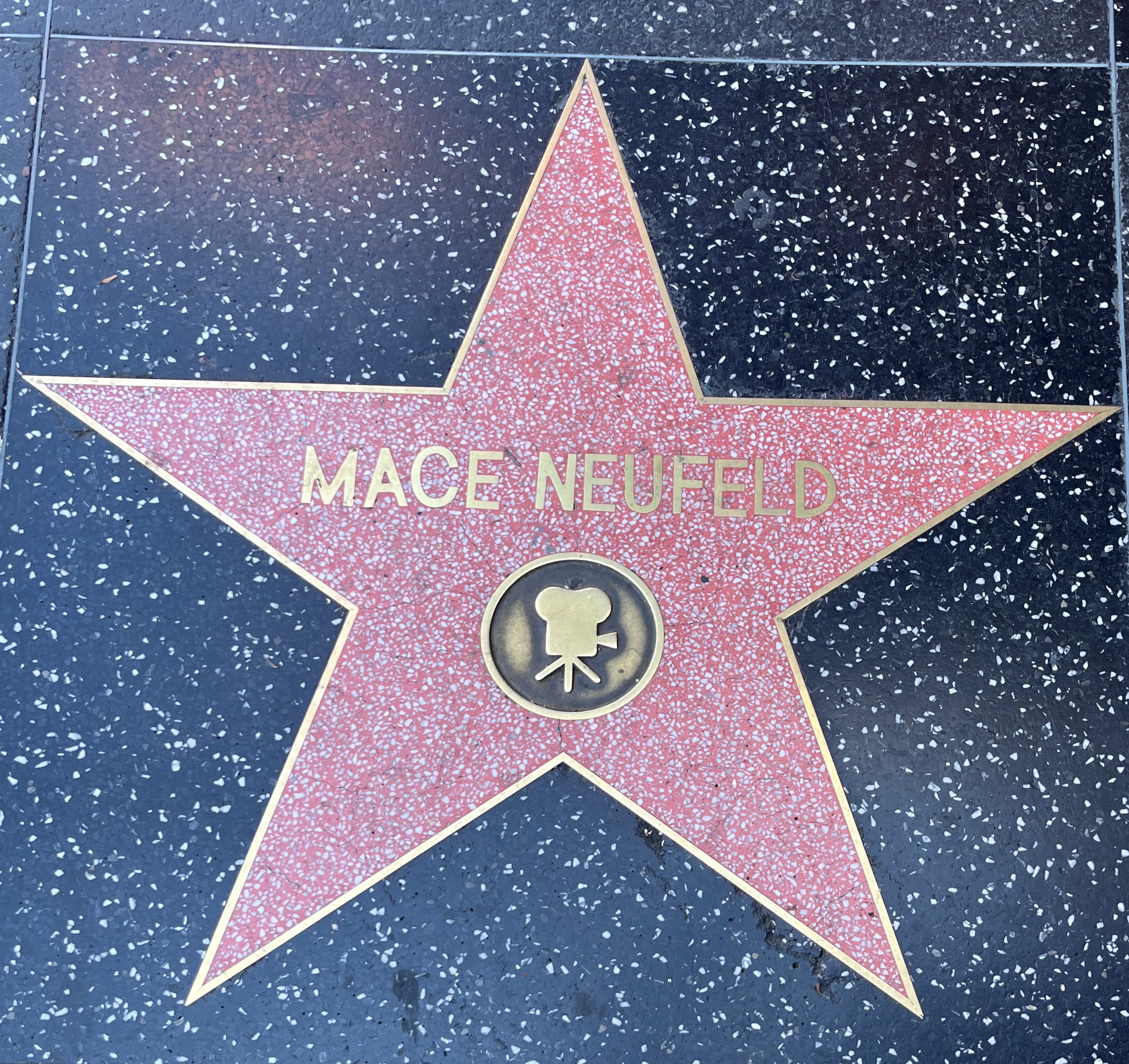
Mace Neufeld's star on the Hollywood Walk of Fame

Neufeld married fashion designer Helen Katz in 1954, and had three children, Bradley, Glenn and Nancy. The couple remained together until Helen's death in 1995. He continued working into his 90s, serving as executive producer on the Amazon series Tom Clancy's Jack Ryan. As he told a reporter in 2014: "I figure I'll continue doing movies as long as I can tie my own shoelaces."

Neufeld died in Beverly Hills, California, on January 21, 2022, at the age of 93.

== Filmography ==
He was a producer in all films unless otherwise noted.

=== Film ===
Year	Film	Credit	Notes
1976	The Omen	Executive producer	
1978	Damien - Omen II	Executive producer	
1979	The Frisco Kid		
1981	The Funhouse	Executive producer	
1985	The Aviator		
1985	Transylvania 6-5000		
1987	No Way Out	Executive producer	
1989	The Punisher	Associate producer	Uncredited
1990	The Hunt for Red October		
1991	Flight of the Intruder		
1991	Stone Cold		Uncredited
1991	Necessary Roughness		
1992	Patriot Games		
1994	Beverly Hills Cop III		
1994	Clear and Present Danger		
1997	The Saint		
1998	Blind Faith	Executive producer	
1998	Lost in Space	Executive producer	
1998	Black Dog	Executive producer	
1999	The General's Daughter		
2000	Bless the Child		
2002	The Sum of All Fears		
2003	Gods and Generals	Executive producer	
2005	Asylum		
2005	Sahara		
2009	Invictus		
2012	Zambezia	Executive producer	
2014	Jack Ryan: Shadow Recruit		
2014	The Equalizer		
2018	The Equalizer 2		

As an actor

Year	Film	Role
2002	The Sum of All Fears	WHCA Dinner Chairman

Thanks

Year	Film	Role
2015	Jasmine	Special thanks
2017	Heart, Baby	Special thanks

=== Television ===
Year	Title	Credit	Notes
1975	The Owl and the Pussycat		Television film
1977–78	Quark	Co-executive producer Executive producer	
1980	Angel on My Shoulder	Executive producer	Television film
1981	East of Eden	Executive producer	
1981	American Dream	Executive producer	
1985	A Death in California	Executive producer	
1991	White Hot: The Mysterious Murder of Thelma Todd	Co-executive producer	Television film
1991	Omen IV: The Awakening	Executive producer	Television film
1992	Lightning Force	Executive producer	
1996	Gridlock	Executive producer	Television film
1996	Woman Undone	Executive producer	Television film
1996	For the Future: The Irvine Fertility Scandal	Executive producer	Television film
1998	Escape: Human Cargo	Executive producer	Television film
2001	Love and Treason	Executive producer	Television film
2018–19	Jack Ryan	Executive producer	
TBA	Outrider	Executive producer	

As writer

Year	Title	Notes
1960–61	Laugh Line	Devised by

As an actor

Year	Title	Role
1968	Get Smart	Herbert

== Awards and nominations ==
Year	Association	Category	Title	Result	Ref.
1981	Emmy Award	Outstanding Limited Series	East of Eden	Nominated	
1993	National Association of Theatre Owners/ShoWest	Producer of the Year		Won	
2003	Santa Barbara International Film Festival	Career Achievement Award		Won	
2009	Critic's Choice Award	Best picture	Invictus	Nominated	
2014	Israel Film Festival	Lifetime Achievement Award		Won	
