= Robert Rehme =

American film producer (born 1935)

- Born: May 5, 1935 (age 91); Cincinnati, Ohio, U.S.
- Occupation: Film producer

Robert Rehme (born May 5, 1935) is an American film producer whose credits include the films Patriot Games, Clear and Present Danger and The General's Daughter.

== Career ==
In 1961, he was manager of RKO Theatres in Cincinnati and in 1969 he joined United Artists's advertising department. In 1976, he formed his own exhibition and distribution firm but later joined New World Pictures as vice president and general sales manager in February 1978.

=== Head of Avco Embassy ===
He joined Avco Embassy Pictures in December 1978 as vice-president and chief operating officer. In November 1979, he was elected president and chief executive officer.

When Rehme started at Avco, he asked for $5 million to make movies. He used it to make eight. "The important thing was not to put Avco at risk for any major amount of money," he said. "We'd finance a movie and find a financial group to buy us out, so we could use the money over again."

Under Rehme's stewardship, the company went from earning $20 million in 1978 to $90 million in 1981. Among its successful films were two from John Carpenter, The Fog and Escape from New York. He also backed The Howling and had a big success with Time Bandits which Avco picked up from Britain. Other hits included Phantasm, The Onion Field and Watership Down. Flops included Winter Kills, Death Ship and Hog Wild.

In December 1981, Avco was bought by Norman Lear and Jerry Perenchio.

=== Universal ===
In June 1981, Rehme joined Universal Pictures, becoming president of the Theatrical Motion Picture Group in December 1982. He quit in December 1983.

=== New World ===
In 1983, he became co-chairman and chief executive officer of New World Entertainment, Inc until 1989.

== Producer ==
In 1989, Rehme and producer Mace Neufeld co-founded the motion picture production company Neufeld/Rehme Productions. It was during this time that he created the pictures for which he is most known, such as Patriot Games and Flight of the Intruder.

Rehme served as a governor of the Academy of Motion Picture Arts and Sciences for eight years before becoming president in 1992, succeeding Karl Malden. Prior to that, he had been President of the Academy Foundation. He could only serve as Academy President for one year, as Academy rules stipulated that he could only sit on the board for nine consecutive terms. He rejoined the board and became president for a second time from 1997 to 2001.

== Select credits ==
He was a producer in all films unless otherwise noted.

=== Film ===
Year	Film	Credit	Notes
1981	An Eye for an Eye	Executive producer	
1982	Vice Squad	Executive producer	
1991	Flight of the Intruder		Uncredited
1991	Necessary Roughness		
1992	Patriot Games		
1994	Beverly Hills Cop III		
1994	Clear and Present Danger		
1998	Blind Faith	Executive producer	
1998	Lost in Space	Executive producer	
1998	Black Dog	Executive producer	
2000	Bless the Child	Executive producer	
2003	Gods and Generals	Executive producer	
2005	Asylum	Executive producer	

=== As Head of Avco ===
Year	Film	Director	Notes
1978	Go Tell the Spartans	Ted Post	Film about Vietnam War with Burt Lancaster
1978	Stingray	Richard Taylor	Action comedy
1978	Watership Down	Martin Rosen	British animated film, box office hit
1979	The Bell Jar	Larry Peerce	Based on Sylvia Plath book
1979	Phantasm	Don Coscarelli	Sci-fi horror, box office hit
1979	Old Boyfriends	Joan Tewksbury	Comedy, cult film
1979	Winter Kills	William Richert	Black comedy, box office flop, cult film
1979	Goldengirl	Joseph Sergeant	Sci-fi sports, box office flop
1979	City on Fire	Alvin Rakoff	Canadian disaster movie, box office flop
1979	The Onion Field	Harold Becker	Based on Joseph Wambaugh book
1979	A Man, a Woman, and a Bank	Noel Black	Canadian heist film
1979	Fish Hawk	Donald Shebib	Canadian drama
1979	Murder by Decree	Bob Clark	Canadian-British movie, Sherlock Holmes
1980	Hog Wild	Les Rose	Canadian comedy
1980	The Fog	John Carpenter	Horror, box office hit
1980	The Black Marble	Harold Becker	Based on Joseph Wamnaugh book
1980	Death Ship	Alvin Rakoff	Canadian horror
1980	The Baltimore Bullet	Robert Ellis Miller	Comedy
1980	Night Games	Roger Vadim	erotic thriller
1980	Prom Night	Paul Lynch	Canadian horror, box office hit
1980	The Exterminator	James Glickenhaus	vigilante film, box office hit
1980	Hopscotch	Ronald Neame	spy comedy
1980	Delusion	Alan Beattie	slasher
1981	Scanners	David Cronenberg	Canadian horror, box office hit
1981	Take This Job and Shove It	Gus Trikonis	Comedy based on a song, box office hit
1981	The Howling	Joe Dante	horror, box office hit
1981	Dirty Tricks	Alvin Rakoff	comedy
1981	The Night the Lights Went Out in Georgia	Ronald Maxwell	comedy based on a song, minor hit
1981	Dead & Buried	Gery Sherman	slasher
1981	Final Exam	Jimmy Houston	slasher film, minor hit
1981	Escape from New York	John Carpenter	sci fi action, box office hit
1981	An Eye for an Eye	Steve Carver	Chuck Norris action, box office hit
1981	Carbon Copy	Michael Schultz	comedy
1981	Tulips	Stan Ferris	comedy
1981	Time Bandits	Terry Gilliam	British sci fi, major hit
1982	Vice Squad	Gary Sherman	action, box office hit
1982	Zapped!	Robert Rosenthal	teen comedy, box office hit

Thanks

Year	Film	Notes
1982	Zapped!	Thanks

=== Television ===
Year	Title	Credit	Notes
1992	Lightning Force	Executive producer	
1996	Gridlock	Executive producer	Television film
1996	Woman Undone	Executive producer	Television film
1996	For the Future: The Irvine Fertility Scandal	Executive producer	Television film
1998	Escape: Human Cargo	Executive producer	Television film
2001	Love and Treason	Executive producer	Television film
2002	Conviction	Executive producer	Television film
2003	Deacons for Defense	Executive producer	Television film

Non-profit organization positions
Preceded by Karl Malden	President of Academy of Motion Pictures, Arts and Sciences; 1992-1993	Succeeded by Arthur Hiller
Preceded by Arthur Hiller	President of Academy of Motion Pictures, Arts and Sciences; 1997-2001	Succeeded by Frank Pierson
