= The Hunt for Red October (1990 video game) =

1990 video game

- Developer: Images Software
- Publisher: Grandslam Interactive
- Composers: Allister Brimble (Amiga, CPC, ST, Spectrum)
- Platforms: Amiga, Amstrad CPC, Atari ST, Commodore 64, MS-DOS, ZX Spectrum
- Release: NA: 1990
- Genre: Action
- Mode: Single-player

The Hunt for Red October is a 1990 action game based on the 1990 film The Hunt for Red October. It was developed by Images Software and released by Grandslam Interactive for the Amiga, Amstrad CPC, Atari ST, Commodore 64, ZX Spectrum, and MS-DOS.

== Gameplay ==
The game features five action sequences including jumping from a helicopter and navigating submarines through deep channels and avoiding various obstacles.
