= Adam Cozad =

American screenwriter

Adam Cozad is an American screenwriter best known for writing the scripts for Jack Ryan: Shadow Recruit, The Legend of Tarzan, and Underwater.

== Life and career ==
Cozad was born and grew up in Chico, California, where he attended Notre Dame School until his tenth grade. He later moved to Texas and went to Trinity University, where he got his major degree in history.

In 2014, Cozad wrote his first screenplay for the action film Jack Ryan: Shadow Recruit, based on the character created by Tom Clancy, with rewrites by David Koepp, of Jurassic Park and Spider-Man fame. Shadow Recruit stars Kevin Costner, Chris Pine, Keira Knightley and Kenneth Branagh (who also directed).

His second screenplay was for the action adventure film The Legend of Tarzan, which he wrote along with Craig Brewer from their own story, which stars Alexander Skarsgård, Margot Robbie, and Christoph Waltz.

Cozad had been hired to write the screenplay for the sequel to Suicide Squad film. He was replaced with James Gunn.

He also performed a revision of Underwater's script from Brian Duffield.

== Filmography ==
Year	Title	Credit	Notes
2014	Jack Ryan: Shadow Recruit	Written by	Co-wrote with David Koepp
2016	The Legend of Tarzan	Screenplay by, story by	Co-wrote with Craig Brewer
2020	Underwater	Written by	Co-wrote with Brian Duffield
2020	Bloodshot	Uncredited script work	
