= Donald E. Stewart =

American screenwriter

Donald Stewart
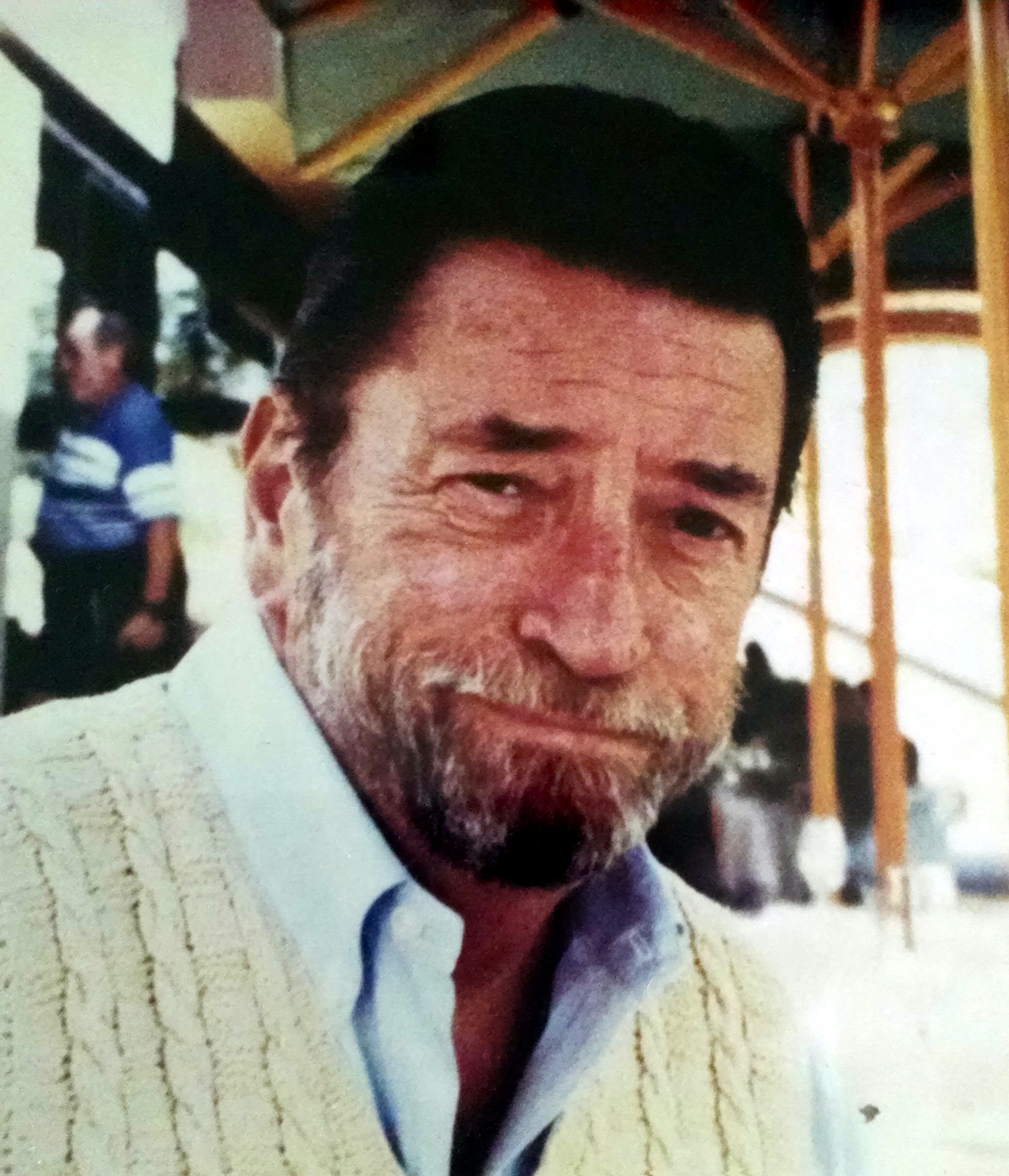
- Donald E. Stewart in 1997
- Born: January 24, 1930; Detroit, Michigan, United States
- Died: April 28, 1999 (aged 69); Los Angeles, California, United States
- Resting place: Westwood Village Memorial Park Cemetery
- Occupation: Screenwriter

Donald E. Stewart (24 January 1930 – 28 April 1999) was an American screenwriter, best known for his screenplay for Missing, which won the Academy Award for Best Adapted Screenplay, the Writers Guild of America Award, the London Film Critics' Circle award, a Christopher Award, (www.christophers.org) and the BAFTA Award for Best Screenplay, all shared with the film's director, Costa-Gavras.

== Life and career ==
Born in Detroit, Michigan, he had an early passion for cars. He began his writing career as a journalist for The Detroit Times. In his 20s, he founded and co-published Competition Press, a weekly magazine devoted to car-racing that eventually became Autoweek; he also briefly edited Motor Life magazine.

In 1960 he left reporting and moved to New York for the advertising industry, becoming copywriter and creative executive for a series of agencies such as J. Walter Thompson, Young & Rubicam and BBDO. Not surprisingly, he specialized in advertising copy for the motor trade, an area of booming competition in the car-obsessed economy of 1960s America. He became creative director of the Fletcher-Richards Agency and an expert on all things automotive.

He moved to Hollywood in his 40s to try his hand at screenwriting. His first film was Roger Corman's Jackson County Jail.

In his Oscar acceptance speech for Missing, Stewart thanked not only the film's director ("my co-writer and friend") but also Charles Horman, the American journalist whose disappearance was the centerpiece of the film. When interviewed about what impact the foreign policy issues raised by Missing had on audiences, Stewart commented: "Movies have a tendency to really heat up the emotions." The screenplay for Missing is used in film schools for instruction in structure and development.

He wrote or co-wrote the screenplays for the Tom Clancy trilogy of Jack Ryan films: The Hunt for Red October, Patriot Games, and Clear and Present Danger.

Stewart died in his apartment at the Sierra Towers in Los Angeles of cancer in 1999 at age 69. He had three children, Scott Stewart (now deceased), Sarah Cassleman, and Peter Stewart. He was separated from his fifth wife at the time of his death.

His last film before his death was Dead Silence, a TV-movie starring James Garner. Hostiles, released in December 2017, was based on a manuscript written by Stewart in the 1980s and brought to life by director and co-writer Scott Cooper.
