= The Hunt for Red October (film) =

1990 film directed by John McTiernan

- Theatrical release poster
- Directed by: John McTiernan
- Screenplay by: Larry Ferguson; Donald E. Stewart
- Based on: The Hunt for Red October by Tom Clancy
- Produced by: Mace Neufeld
- Starring: Sean Connery; Alec Baldwin; Scott Glenn; James Earl Jones; Sam Neill
- Cinematography: Jan de Bont
- Edited by: Dennis Virkler; John Wright
- Music by: Basil Poledouris
- Production company: Mace Neufeld Productions
- Distributed by: Paramount Pictures
- Release date: March 2, 1990 (United States)
- Running time: 135 minutes
- Country: United States
- Languages: English; Russian
- Budget: $30 million
- Box office: $200.5 million

The Hunt for Red October (alternate on-screen Russian title: Красный октябрь, "Red October") is a 1990 American submarine spy thriller film directed by John McTiernan, produced by Mace Neufeld, and starring Sean Connery, Alec Baldwin, Scott Glenn, James Earl Jones, and Sam Neill. The film is an adaptation of Tom Clancy's 1984 bestselling novel of the same name. It is the first installment of the film series featuring the protagonist Jack Ryan.

The story is set during the late Cold War era and involves a rogue Soviet naval captain who wishes to defect to the United States with his officers and the Soviet Navy's newest and most advanced ballistic missile submarine, a fictional improvement on the Soviet Typhoon-class submarine. A CIA analyst correctly deduces his motive and must prove his theory before a violent confrontation between the Soviet Red Fleet and the United States Navy spirals out of control.

The film was a co-production between the motion picture studios Paramount Pictures, Mace Neufeld Productions, and Nina Saxon Film Design. Theatrically, it was commercially distributed by Paramount Pictures and by the Paramount Home Video division for home media markets. Following its wide theatrical release, the film was nominated for and won a number of accolades. At the 63rd Academy Awards, the film won the Academy Award for Best Sound Editing, along with nominations for Best Sound Mixing and Best Film Editing. On June 12, 1990, the original soundtrack, composed and conducted by Basil Poledouris, was released by MCA Records. The Hunt for Red October received mostly positive reviews from critics and was the sixth-highest-grossing domestic film of the year, generating $122 million in North America and over $200 million worldwide in box office business.

== Plot ==
In November 1984, Soviet submarine captain Marko Ramius is given command of Red October, a new Typhoon-class ballistic missile submarine with a "caterpillar drive", rendering it nearly undetectable to passive sonar. At sea, Ramius secretly kills political officer Ivan Putin and relays false orders to his crew that they are to conduct missile drills off America's east coast. American Los Angeles-class attack submarine USS Dallas, which had been shadowing Red October, loses contact once the sub's caterpillar drive is engaged.

CIA analyst and former Marine Jack Ryan is based in London, but returns to Washington, D.C. After consulting with Vice Admiral James Greer, the deputy director of the CIA, Ryan briefs government officials on Red October and the threat it poses. Upon learning that the bulk of the Soviet Navy has been deployed to the Atlantic to locate and sink the sub, the military staff conclude that Ramius plans a renegade nuclear strike.

Countering this view, Ryan hypothesizes that Ramius, a native-born Lithuanian widower with few remaining personal ties to the Soviet Union, actually plans to defect with the sub, to the United States. National Security Advisor Jeffrey Pelt gives Ryan three days to confirm his theory before the U.S. Navy will be ordered to find and sink Red October. Ryan sets out to rendezvous with an aircraft carrier in the mid-Atlantic.

An unknown saboteur causes Red October's caterpillar drive to malfunction during risky maneuvers through a narrow undersea canyon. Aboard Dallas, Petty Officer Ronald "Jonesy" Jones, a sonar technician, discovers a way to detect Red October using his underwater acoustics software, and the boat plots an intercept course. After a hazardous mid-ocean transfer, Ryan is able to board Dallas, where he attempts to persuade its captain, Commander Bart Mancuso, to contact Ramius and determine his real intentions.

The Soviet ambassador informs Pelt that Ramius intends to launch a missile attack on the U.S. and asks for help in sinking Red October. That order is sent to the U.S. fleet, including Dallas, which has reacquired the Soviet sub. Ryan remains convinced that Ramius plans to defect with his officers and finally convinces Mancuso to contact Ramius and offer assistance. Ramius, stunned that the Americans correctly guessed his plan, accepts Mancuso's offer. Ramius then stages a nuclear reactor "emergency", ordering the sub to surface and his crew to abandon ship. After a U.S. frigate is spotted heading right for them, Ramius submerges, leaving his crew in life rafts, telling his medical officer, Dr. Petrov, who stays with the crew, that Ramius and his remaining officers will scuttle the Red October and go down with the sub. Ryan, Mancuso, and Jonesy board Red October via a rescue submarine, at which point Ramius turns over his sub to the Americans and requests asylum for himself and his officers.

Red October is then ambushed by Alfa-class submarine V. K. Konovalov, commanded by Ramius' former student, Captain Tupolev. Konovalov fires upon Red October with a torpedo which Ramius destroys by causing it to impact Red October before it can arm. As the two Soviet subs maneuver, one of Red October's cooks, Loginov, reveals himself to be the saboteur and an undercover agent for the Soviet GRU. He opens fire on the bridge, fatally wounding first officer Vasily Borodin, before retreating to the missile bay, intending to ignite a missile engine and destroy the ship.

Loginov is pursued by Ryan and Ramius, and he wounds Ramius before being killed by Ryan. Konovalov launches a second torpedo which is set to arm immediately. Dallas is able to divert it toward herself and evade by launching countermeasures and conducting an emergency blow to the surface. The torpedo reacquires Red October but Mancuso maneuvers towards the Konovalov, which the torpedo strikes and destroys. The crew of Red October, now rescued, witness the submerged explosion from the deck of the U.S. frigate. Unaware of the Konovalov's presence, they believe that Ramius has sacrificed himself and scuttled Red October to avoid being boarded.

With their subterfuge complete, Ryan and Ramius navigate Red October to the Penobscot River in Maine, where Ryan grew up. Later, despite his own fear of flying, Ryan falls asleep on a flight home to London next to a teddy bear for his daughter.

== Cast ==
Government Officials in Washington

- Alec Baldwin as Jack Ryan, CIA intelligence analyst, author, professor of naval history at the United States Naval Academy
- James Earl Jones as Vice Admiral James Greer, USN, deputy director of the CIA
- Jeffrey Jones as Skip Tyler, a former submarine commander who identifies Red October's propulsion system
- Richard Jordan as Jeffrey Pelt, National Security Advisor
- Joss Ackland as Andrei Lysenko, Soviet ambassador to the United States

Crew of the Red October

- Sean Connery as Captain 1st rank Marko Ramius, commanding officer
- Sam Neill as Captain 2nd rank Vasily Borodin, Executive Officer
- Tim Curry as Dr. Yevgeni Petrov, medical officer
- Peter Firth as 1st Lieutenant Ivan Putin, political officer
- Tomas Arana as Igor Loginov, a GRU agent
- Michael Welden as Captain Lieutenant Gregoriy Kamarov, Navigation officer
- Ronald Guttman as Lieutenant Melekhin, Chief Engineer
- Anatoly Davydov as Sonar Officer
- Boris Lee Krutonog as Viktor Slavin, Diving Officer
- Sven-Ole Thorsen as Red October COB
- Ivan G'Vera as Officer on Red October

Crew of the USS Dallas

- Scott Glenn as Commander Bart Mancuso, USN, commanding officer
- Anthony Peck as Lt. Commander "Tommy" Thompson, Executive Officer
- Larry Ferguson as Master Chief Petty Officer Watson, USN, Chief of the boat
- Courtney B. Vance as Petty Officer Ronald "Jonesy" Jones, sonar operator
- Ned Vaughn as Seaman Beaumont, a junior sonar operator
- Mark Draxton as Lieutenant Wolfe, Officer

Crew of the USS Enterprise

- Fred Dalton Thompson as Rear Admiral Joshua Painter, USN, Commander of the Enterprise carrier battle group
- Daniel Davis as Captain Charlie Davenport, Commanding Officer
- Timothy Carhart as Lt. Commander Bill Steiner, USN, commander of the US Navy's deep-submergence rescue vehicle Mystic

Miscellaneous

- Stellan Skarsgård as Captain 2nd rank Viktor Tupolev, Commanding Officer of Konovalov and Ramius's former student
- Krzysztof Janczar as Yevgeni Bonovia, Executive Officer of Konovalov
- Rick Ducommun as C-2A Navigator
- Peter Zinner as Admiral Yuri Padorin
- Gates McFadden as Dr. Caroline Ryan, Jack's wife

In addition, the director's father, John McTiernan Sr., has a credited cameo as one of the attendees at Ryan's briefing for the National Security Advisor.

== Production ==
=== Development ===
Producer Mace Neufeld optioned Tom Clancy's novel after reading galley proofs in February 1985. Although the book became a bestseller, no Hollywood studio was interested because of its content. Neufeld said, "I read some of the reports from the other studios, and the story was too complicated to understand". After a year and a half, he finally got a high-level executive at Paramount Pictures to read Clancy's novel and agree to develop it into a film.

Screenwriters Larry Ferguson and Donald Stewart worked on the screenplay while Neufeld approached the U.S. Navy for approval. They feared top secret information or technology might be revealed. However, several admirals liked Clancy's book and reasoned that the film could do for submariners what Top Gun did for the Navy's jet fighter pilots. Captain Michael Sherman, director of the Navy's western regional information office in Los Angeles, suggested changes to the script that would present the Navy in a positive light.

The Navy gave the filmmakers access to several Los Angeles-class submarines, allowing them to photograph unclassified sections of both Chicago and Portsmouth to use in set and prop design. Louisville was used for the scene in which Baldwin is dropped from a helicopter to the submarine. Key cast and crew members rode along in subs, including Alec Baldwin and Scott Glenn, who took an overnight trip aboard Salt Lake City commanded by then Commander Thomas B. Fargo. Glenn based his portrayal of Commander Bart Mancuso on Fargo.

=== Casting ===
Some of the principal cast had previous military service which they drew on for their roles. Sean Connery had served in the Royal Navy, Scott Glenn in the United States Marine Corps, and James Earl Jones in the United States Army. Baldwin and Glenn spent time on a Los Angeles-class submarine. Baldwin was trained to drive an attack submarine. Some extras portraying the Dallas crew were serving submariners, including the pilot of the DSRV, Lt Cmdr George Billy. Submariners from San Diego were cast as extras because it was easier to hire them than to train actors. Crew from USS La Jolla, including Lt Mark Draxton, took leave to participate in filming. According to an article in Sea Classics, at least two sailors from the Atlantic Fleet-based Dallas took leave and participated in the Pacific Fleet-supported filming. The crew of the Houston called their month-long filming schedule the "Hunt for Red Ops." Houston made more than 40 emergency surfacing "blows" for rehearsal and for the cameras.

The filmmakers' first choice to portray Jack Ryan was Kevin Costner, who turned down the film in order to star in and direct Dances with Wolves. Harrison Ford was also approached to play Jack Ryan but turned it down. He later replaced Alec Baldwin as Ryan in Patriot Games. Baldwin was approached in December 1988, but was not told for what role. Klaus Maria Brandauer was cast as Soviet sub commander Marko Ramius but resigned the role two weeks into filming due to a prior commitment.

The producers faxed the script to Sean Connery, who at first declined because the script seemed implausible in portraying the Soviet Union as an ambitious naval power. He was missing the first page which set the story before Gorbachev's coming to power, when the events of the book would have seemed more plausible. He arrived in L.A. on a Friday and was supposed to start filming on Monday but he requested a day to rehearse. Principal photography began on April 3, 1989, with a $30 million budget. The Navy lent the film crew the Houston, Enterprise, two frigates (Wadsworth and Reuben James), helicopters, and a dry-dock crew.

Filmmaker John Milius revised some of the film's script, writing a few speeches for Sean Connery and all of his Russian dialogue. He was asked to rewrite the whole film but was only required to do the Russian sequences. Rather than choosing between the realism of Russian dialog with subtitles, or the audience-friendly use of English (with or without Russian accents), the filmmakers compromised with a deliberate conceit. The film begins with the actors speaking Russian with English subtitles. But in an early scene, actor Peter Firth casually switches in mid-sentence to speaking in English on the word "Armageddon", which is the same spoken word in both languages. After that point, all the Soviets' dialogue is communicated in English. Connery continued using his native Scottish accent for the rest of the motion picture. Only towards the climax of the film, at the beginning of the scene in which the Soviet and American submariners meet, do some of the actors speak in Russian again.

=== Filming ===
Filming in submarines was impractical. Instead, five soundstages on the Paramount backlot were used. Two 50-square-foot (4.6 m^{2}) platforms housing mock-ups of Red October and Dallas were built, standing on hydraulic gimbals that simulated the sub's movements. Connery recalled, "It was very claustrophobic. There were 62 people in a very confined space, 45 feet (14 m) above the stage floor. It got very hot on the sets, and I'm also prone to sea sickness. The set would tilt to 45 degrees. Very disturbing." The veteran actor shot for four weeks and the rest of the production shot for additional months on location in Port Angeles, Washington and the waters off Los Angeles. Scenes of a shipyard in Patuxent, Maryland were filmed at a submarine base in Point Loma, San Diego.

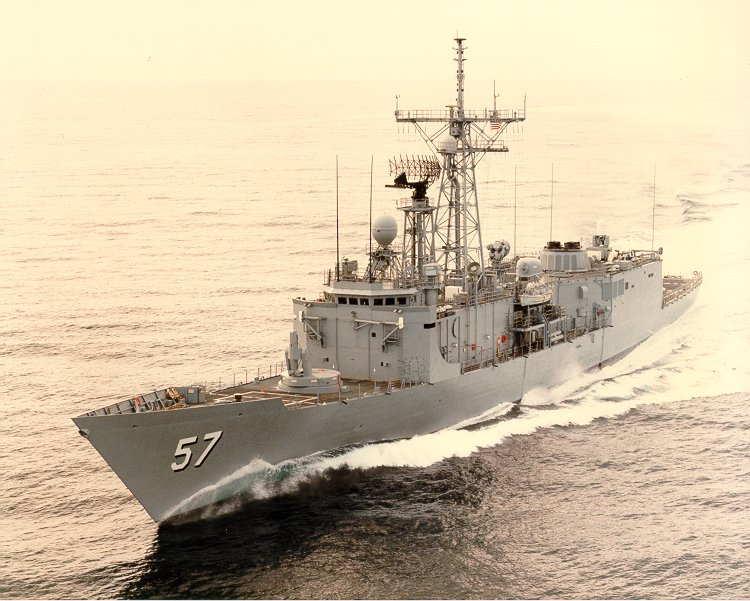
USS Reuben James, where a number of flight deck scenes were filmed

Made before the extensive use of CGI became the norm in filmmaking, the film's opening sequence featured a long pull-out reveal of the immense titular Typhoon-class sub. It included a nearly full-scale, above-the-water-line mockup of the sub, constructed from two barges welded together. Each country's submarine had its own background color: Soviet submarines, such as Red October and V.K. Konovalov, had interiors in black with chrome trim. American ships, such as Dallas and Enterprise, had grey interiors.

Early filming was aboard Reuben James in the area of the Juan de Fuca Strait and Puget Sound in March 1989. The ship operated out of U.S. Coast Guard Station Port Angeles. The SH-60B detachment from the Battlecats of HSL-43 operated out of NAS Whidbey Island, after being displaced by the film crew. Most underwater scenes were filmed using smoke, with a model sub connected to 12 cables, giving precise, smooth control for turns. Computer effects, in their infancy, created bubbles and other effects such as particulates in the water.

In March 1990, just before the film's theatrical release, the Soviet Parliament removed the Communist Party from government, effectively ending the Cold War. Set during this period, there were concerns that with its end, the film would be irrelevant but Neufeld felt that it "never really represented a major problem". To compensate for the change in the Soviet Union's political climate, an on-screen crawl appears at the beginning of the film stating that it takes place in 1984, during the Cold War. Tony Seiniger designed the film's poster and drew inspiration from Soviet poster art, using bold red, white and black graphics. According to him, the whole ad campaign was designed to have a "techno-suspense quality to it". The idea was to play up the thriller aspects and downplay the political elements.

The film caused a minor sensation in the submarine black projects warfare technology community. In one scene, where USS Dallas is chasing Red October through the submarine canyon, the crew can be heard calling out that they have various "milligal anomalies". This essentially revealed the use of gravimetry as a method of silent navigation in US submarines, though this method of navigation had been explained as the navigation method of Red October in the book six years earlier. Thought to be a billion-dollar black project, the development of a full-tensor gravity gradiometer by Bell Aerospace was a classified technology at the time. It was thought to be deployed on only a few Ohio-class submarines after it was first developed in 1973. Bell Aerospace later sold the technology to Bell Geospace for oil exploration purposes. The last Typhoon-class submarine was officially laid down in 1986, under the name TK-210, but according to sources was never finished and scrapped in 1990.

== Music ==
The Hunt for Red October: Music from the Motion Picture

Film score by Basil Poledouris
- Released: June 12, 1990
- Length: 29:48
- Label: MCA Records

The musical score of The Hunt for Red October was composed and conducted by Basil Poledouris and performed by the Hollywood Studio Symphony. A soundtrack album composed of ten melodies was released on June 12, 1990. The album is missing some of the musical moments present in the film, including the scene where the crew of Red October sings the Soviet national hymn. The soundtrack is limited due to the fact that it was originally compiled to fit the Compact Cassette. Later, it was remastered for the CD. An expanded version was released in late 2013 by Intrada Records. It features 40 additional minutes of the score, including the until-then-unreleased end titles.

== Release ==
=== Home media ===
A standard VHS release debuted on October 25, 1990; followed by another VHS in widescreen on September 10, 1996.

For the 30th anniversary commemoration, Paramount Home Entertainment released a 4K Steelbook + Blu-ray+Digital version of the film.

== Reception ==
=== Box office ===
The Hunt for Red October opened in 1,225 theaters on March 2, 1990, grossing $17 million on its opening weekend, more than half its budget. The film opened at number one at the U.S. box office and remained there for three weeks. Its opening was the 20th biggest weekend of all time and the biggest non-summer, non-Thanksgiving weekend to date.

The film went on to gross $122,012,643 in North America with a worldwide total of $200,512,643.

=== Critical response ===
On Rotten Tomatoes, the film holds an approval rating of 88% based on 76 reviews, with an average rating of 7.70/10. The site's consensus states: "Perfectly cast and packed with suspense, The Hunt for Red October is an old-fashioned submarine thriller with plenty of firepower to spare." On Metacritic, it has a weighted average score of 58 out of 100 based on 17 critics, indicating "mixed or average views". Audiences polled by CinemaScore gave the film an average grade of "A" on an A+ to F scale.

Roger Ebert gave the film three-and-a-half stars out of four, calling it "a skillful, efficient film that involves us in the clever and deceptive game being played", while Gene Siskel commented on the film's technical achievement and Baldwin's convincing portrayal of Jack Ryan. Nick Schager, for Slant magazine's review, noted, "The Hunt for Red October is a thrilling edge-of-your-seat trifle that has admirably withstood the test of time". In contrast, Newsweek's David Ansen wrote, "But it's at the gut level that Red October disappoints. This smoother, impressively mounted machine is curiously ungripping. Like an overfilled kettle, it takes far too long to come to a boil". In a review for The New York Times, Vincent Canby noted that "the characters, like the lethal hardware, are simply functions of the plot, which in this case seems to be a lot more complex than it really is."

In a review for Rolling Stone, Peter Travers criticized the film and wrote: "Like Top Gun before it, Hunt is tub thumping for a strong defense capability. If the plodding exposition doesn’t get you first, the propaganda will. The only sensible reaction can be summed up in one word: Mayday."

=== Accolades ===
The Hunt for Red October was nominated and won several awards in 1991. In addition, the film was also nominated for AFI's 100 Years...100 Thrills.

Award	Category	Nominee	Result
1991 63rd Academy Awards	Best Film Editing	Dennis Virkler, John Wright	Nominated
1991 63rd Academy Awards	Best Sound	Richard Bryce Goodman, Richard Overton, Kevin F. Cleary, Don J. Bassman	Nominated
1991 63rd Academy Awards	Best Sound Effects Editing	Cecelia Hall, George Watters II	Won
1991 44th British Academy Film Awards	Best Actor	Sean Connery	Nominated
1991 44th British Academy Film Awards	Best Production Design	Terence Marsh	Nominated
1991 44th British Academy Film Awards	Best Sound	Cecelia Hall, George Watters II, Richard Bryce Goodman, Don J. Bassman	Nominated
1991 BMI Film Music Awards	BMI Film Music Award	Basil Poledouris	Won
1991 Motion Picture Sound Editors Awards	Best Sound Editing – ADR	————	Won

== See also ==
- 1990 in film
- The Hunt for Red October (1990 video game)
- The Hunt for Red October (console game)
