= Mitch Rapp =

Fictional character created by novelist Vince Flynn

- First appearance: American Assassin
- Created by: Vince Flynn
- Portrayed by: Dylan O'Brien (film adaptation)

In-universe information
- Aliases: Mitch Kruse, Mike Kruse, Irving
- Gender: Male
- Title: Special Assistant to the Director of the CIA on Counterterrorism
- Occupation: Counter Terrorism Operative
- Family: Steven Rapp (brother)
- Spouse: Anna Rielly (from Executive Power to Consent to Kill)

Mitch Rapp is a fictional character in a series of novels that were written by Vince Flynn and in the film adaptation of American Assassin. Since Flynn's death in 2013, the series has been continued by Kyle Mills and Don Bentley.

== Character introduction ==
Rapp is a counter-terrorism operative employed, first unofficially then officially, by the CIA. The primary focus of the character is thwarting foreign terrorist attacks on the United States. He is presented as an aggressive operative who is willing to take measures that are more extreme than might be considered commonly acceptable.

== Biographical summary ==
Rapp attended Syracuse University, where he majored in international business and minored in French. He attended the college on a lacrosse scholarship and was an All-American. Rapp was also offered a scholarship by the University of North Carolina, but turned it down, because his high school sweetheart Maureen was attending Syracuse with the hope of getting into broadcasting. Maureen, whom Rapp had known since he was sixteen years old, was killed in the December 21, 1988 bombing of Pan Am Flight 103. She had been one of thirty-five Syracuse students returning from a semester overseas.

Almost a year after Maureen's death, Rapp was recruited into the CIA by Irene Kennedy. He began training the week after graduating from Syracuse. Rapp, who was twenty three years old at the time, did not go through the standard CIA training program at "The Farm", outside Williamsburg, Virginia. Instead, for a year his training was handled by Stan Hurley, a former CIA operative, who taught him "how to shoot, stab, blow things up, and even kill with his bare hands". He was schooled in firearms and marksmanship, hand-to-hand combat, and explosives. He was to build up endurance with long swims and runs, and also worked on his foreign language skills. Since he had minored in French at Syracuse, within a month at the CIA he was fluent in the language.

He speaks Arabic and Persian fluently, and can passably speak Urdu and Pashto. He also speaks French, German and Italian. He is ambidextrous, but naturally left-handed.

Following this training, Rapp became an operative of the Orion Team, a highly secretive organization supported by the CIA but outside the Agency, specializing in counter-terrorism. It is funded by money that has been diverted out of congressionally funded programs, and formed in response to the Lockerbie disaster, by the then CIA director of operations Thomas Stansfield. The unit operates in secret, independent of the U.S. national security apparatus and circumvents the leviathan of politics and gets around small impediments like the executive order banning assassinations. The team is headed by Rapp's recruiter, Irene Kennedy, whose official role is as director of the CIA's Counterterrorism Center.

Rapp became the Orion Team's star operative almost from the day he started and was honed into the most effective counterterrorism operative in America's arsenal. He spent significant amounts of time in Europe, the Middle East, and Southwest Asia collecting intelligence and carrying out assassinations when required.

Officially, Rapp has nothing to do with the U.S. government; rather, he is referred to in the business as a private contractor. Rapp lives a life completely separate from the Agency. His cover is that of a successful entrepreneur. With the help of the CIA, he runs a small computer consulting business on the side that trades internationally, which gives him the cover to travel frequently. To keep things legitimate, Rapp often does indeed conduct business while abroad.

One of Rapp's aliases is Mitch Kruse. In the special ops community he is often known only by his call sign, "Iron Man" after the annual Ironman Triathlon in which he has participated on several occasions and has twice won. His only remaining family is his brother, Steven Rapp, a millionaire financial genius. Mitch and Steven grew up in McLean, Virginia.

Throughout the books, Rapp works with several special operations units including Navy SEALs and DEVGRU, Delta Force, Air Force Special Operations Command, the FBI Hostage Rescue Team, and the 160th Special Operations Aviation Regiment (Airborne). He also has close ties with "SEAL Demolition and Salvage Corporation", a private military company specializing in underwater salvage such as getting rid of debris for ports and shipyards and training law enforcement divers, but whose employees also work from time to time as freelance operatives for the CIA. The company is owned and operated by Scott Coleman, former commanding officer of SEAL Team Six and friend of Rapp.

== Relationship with other characters ==
- Thomas Stansfield, the director of CIA (Transfer of Power, The Third Option, American Assassin, Kill Shot)
- Irene Kennedy, the Director of the Counter-terrorism Center (Transfer of Power and The Third Option, American Assassin, Kill Shot) and the Director of the CIA (Separation of Power through Total Power)
- Stan Hurley, his Trainer and Mentor (Pursuit of Honor, American Assassin, Kill Shot, The Last Man)
- Scott Coleman, Trusted Comrade in Arms, Former commander of SEAL Team Six, recipient of the Silver Star and the Navy Cross, owner of the SEAL Demolition and Salvage Corporation, and private contractor for the CIA (“Appeared in: Term Limits, The Third Option, Separation of Power, Executive Power, Consent to Kill, Act of Treason, Extreme Measures, Pursuit of Honor, The Last Man, The Survivor, Order To Kill, Enemy Of The State, Red War, Lethal Agent, Total Power)

== Novels ==
=== Vince Flynn ===
presented in order of storyline chronology

1. American Assassin (2010)
2. Kill Shot (2012)
3. Term Limits (1997) - Rapp does not appear but Scott Coleman does
4. Transfer of Power (1999)
5. The Third Option (2000)
6. Separation of Power (2001)
7. Executive Power (2003)
8. Memorial Day (2004)
9. Consent to Kill (2005)
10. Act of Treason (2006)
11. Protect and Defend (2007)
12. Extreme Measures (2008)
13. Pursuit of Honor (2009)
14. The Last Man (2012)

=== Kyle Mills ===
1. The Survivor (2015)
2. Order to Kill (2016)
3. Enemy of the State (2017)
4. Red War (2018)
5. Lethal Agent (2019)
6. Total Power (2020)
7. Enemy at the Gates (2021)
8. Oath of Loyalty (2022)
9. Code Red (2023)

=== Don Bentley ===
1. Capture or Kill (2024)
2. Denied Access (2025)
3. Double Tap (2026)

== Screen adaptation ==
The New York Times bestseller, Consent to Kill, was intended to be the first Mitch Rapp film in a proposed series of films by CBS Films. Consent to Kill was scheduled to be produced by Lorenzo di Bonaventura and Nick Wechsler; the screenplay was written by Jonathan Lemkin. The studio's last few films had performed poorly, causing them to delay the production of this film. Antoine Fuqua was originally attached to direct, with several names being rumored to play Rapp, including Gerard Butler, Colin Farrell and Matthew Fox, but the studio announced some major changes in June 2011. One of these changes was that although the first film in the series was initially going to be based on an earlier novel, it would now be based it on a later instalment, American Assassin, which explains how Rapp became a CIA officer. Another change was that the leading man would, consequently, be younger, to reflect Rapp at a younger age and still at the beginning of his covert career. On 19 January 2016 CBS Films announced that American Assassin would be directed by Michael Cuesta and written by Stephen Schiff. Production needed to start by April 30, 2016, or the rights to the film would revert to the Vince Flynn Estate. On May 10, 2016, Deadline announced that 24-year-old actor Dylan O'Brien was in talks to play Rapp, with the "idea that O’Brien’s Mitch Rapp is college aged, and the hope is the actor grows as the series progresses."

The movie filmed between the months of September and December 2016, with shooting taking place in London, Rome, Valletta, Phuket, and Birmingham. The action film follows the rise of Rapp (O’Brien), a CIA black ops recruit under the instruction of Cold War veteran Stan Hurley (Michael Keaton). The pair is then enlisted by CIA Deputy Director Irene Kennedy (Sanaa Lathan) to investigate a wave of apparently random attacks on both military and civilian targets. Together, the three discover a pattern in the violence leading them to a joint mission with a lethal Iranian agent (Shiva Negar) to stop a mysterious operative (Taylor Kitsch) intent on starting a World War in the Middle East.
