= The Fourth Option =

2026 novel by Jack Carr and M. P. Woodward

- Hardcover edition
- Author: Jack Carr and M. P. Woodward
- Language: English
- Genre: Thriller
- Publisher: Atria/Emily Bestler Books
- Publication date: May 12, 2026
- Publication place: United States
- Media type: Print (hardback & paperback)
- Pages: 414
- ISBN: 978-1-6680-7201-1

The Fourth Option is a thriller novel written by Jack Carr and M. P. Woodward. It introduces Chris Walker, a former Navy SEAL and CIA Ground Branch operative who becomes involved in an investigation of corruption and organized crime after the death of a former teammate's son.

The book was released on May 12, 2026, by Atria/Emily Bestler Books.

== Plot ==
Chris Walker, a former Navy SEAL and CIA Ground Branch operator, contemplates suicide inside his Volkswagen van on a Washington bluff. He suffers from survivor's grief following the death of his teammate, John Staub, during an assignment in Afghanistan. After contacting police to report his intended death, Walker receives text notifications from John's widow, Leigh Ann Staub, in New Orleans. Her messages interrupt his plans and bring back memories of his fallen teammate.

In 2019, at Bagram Air Base, Walker and Staub discussed their families, vehicles, and Staub's historic Tudor watch. They partnered with CIA case officer Leonard Fisk to manage an asset named Naji Mansour, codenamed Mongoose. Mansour supplied intelligence to American authorities in exchange for promised United States citizenship visas for his wife and two daughters. A tracking device concealed inside a rug helped their team locate a Haqqani network compound. An explosion caused a building to collapse onto Walker, leaving him with a severe traumatic brain injury.

In 2021, Staub rescued Walker, but died during the operation. His death left Walker with physical scars and lasting emotional suffering. After hearing Leigh Ann's messages, Walker abandons his suicide attempt and returns her call. She tells him about John's journal, which records an illegal narcotics operation distributing fentanyl and heroin. John had associated with dangerous people, and Leigh Ann's house had been ransacked. Fearing for her safety, she asks Walker for assistance.

Walker travels to New Orleans, Louisiana, using his customized Vanagon. Meanwhile, politician Irene Catherine Isaacson announces her candidacy for the upcoming gubernatorial election. The several corrupt New Orleans police officers protect a profitable narcotics business through their association with cartel affiliates. Upon arriving, Walker recognizes that local criminals and officers are watching him. He reunites with Belle, a trusted associate who helps examine files recovered from the criminal network. They retreat to a secluded cabin while examining evidence of police misconduct.

Lieutenant Bates orders an assault on Walker's position. During a nighttime gun battle, Walker kills two corrupt officers before relocating to an isolated oak grove near the Mississippi River. FBI Agent Stanton begins examining the officers' deaths and finds connections to Staub's past. He suspects an experienced military operative is responsible.

The criminal network's assassin, known as the Afghan, is Mansour. After surviving Afghanistan, he lost his wife and daughters to Taliban retaliation because their promised American visas never arrived. Their deaths prompted him to settle in Louisiana and join the cartel against the American institutions he blamed for their fate. Meanwhile, Belle is abducted at the cabin and used to lure Walker into an ambush.

Walker is captured and restrained inside the cabin. Bates taunts him while wearing Staub's stolen Tudor watch. The officers intend to kill Belle and dispose of Walker. Stanton arrives but Mansour disarms him and takes him hostage. During the confrontation, Walker manages to overcome Mansour and escape his restraints. He defeats the remaining criminals and rescues Belle.

With the narcotics operation dismantled and Staub's family protected, Walker begins to recover his sense of purpose. He drives his camper to Kerlerec Street, reunites with his dog Paladin, and prepares to play his vintage guitar.

== Release ==
The Fourth Option is scheduled to be released and publishing date by Atria/Emily Bestler Books in the United States on May 12, 2026.

== Reception ==
The Fourth Option received positive reviews from critics. EJ Ward of LBC praised its pacing, action sequences, and New Orleans atmosphere, describing it as an engaging start to a new thriller series. Ward also commended the characterization of Walker and his relationship with his Belgian Malinois, Paladin. Susan Gorgioski of The Cipher Brief examined Walker's personal struggles and the novel's themes of justice and redemption, highlighting the combination of military thriller and investigative fiction.

Ryan Steck of The Real Book Spy described the novel as a strong beginning to a new series, praising its central character and its exploration of justice, personal guilt, and vengeance.
