= Separation of powers (disambiguation) =

The separation of powers is a model for the governance of a state.

Separation of powers may also refer to:

- Separation of Power, 2001 novel by Vince Flynn
- "Separation of Powers" (The West Wing), episode 95 of The West Wing
