= Consent to Kill =

2005 political thriller novel by Vince Flynn

- Hardcover edition
- Author: Vince Flynn
- Language: English
- Series: Mitch Rapp series
- Genre: Fiction
- Publisher: Simon & Schuster
- Publication date: 11 October 2005
- Publication place: United States of America
- ISBN: 978-1-4165-0501-3
- OCLC: 71230465
- Preceded by: Memorial Day
- Followed by: Act of Treason

Consent to Kill is a thriller novel by Vince Flynn, and the eighth in a series that features CIA counterterrorism agent Mitch Rapp. In this thriller, Flynn focuses on the war on terror exploring all its aspects, from the president of the United States, to the CIA, the foot soldiers and the potentially deadly terrorists.

== Plot summary ==
In Flynn's previous novel, Memorial Day, CIA counter-terror operative and assassin Mitch Rapp uncovered an Al-Qaeda plot to use a nuclear weapon obtained from abandoned Russian nuclear storage bunkers. The ultimate goal was the destruction of Washington, D.C., and Rapp was forced to torture the only man who knew the details of the plan: Waheed Abdullah. Rapp then faked Waheed's death to prevent the Saudi Government from learning of it and rescuing him, while preserving a useful source for himself. To keep Waheed from being discovered, Rapp puts him in an Afghan prison.

However, this plan backfires: Waheed's father, Saeed Ahmed Abdullah, a billionaire Saudi businessman and a jihadist himself, learns that Rapp has "killed" his son. Saeed beseeches Saudi Prince Muhammed bin Rashid for help. Rashid puts Saeed in contact with a former East German Stasi officer, Erich Abel, and Saeed puts a $20 million contract on Rapp's head.

Abel, through his contacts, approaches two assassins, a husband and wife team, Louis Gould and Claudia Morrell. For $10 million, they agree to kill Rapp. Claudia, who is pregnant, specifically asks Louis not to kill Rapp's wife, Anna, as she is also pregnant. Louis agrees, and both leave for America.

In Washington, Rapp is angered by the new Director of National Intelligence, Mark Ross, who authorized surveillance of Rapp's co-worker and friend, former Navy SEAL Scott Coleman. Ross sends the IRS to investigate Coleman, and requests Coleman's personnel file from the Navy. Ross has ambitions to the presidency and views his current position as a stepping stone to the White House. He has no respect for Rapp because of Rapp's reckless actions and, despite his contributions, wants to fire him.

Rapp decides to visit Ross to stop his investigation of Coleman, but he loses his famous temper when he finds a satellite photo of Coleman and discovers his friend was an active topic of interest. He physically holds the National Security adviser by the collar and slaps him with a folder holding Coleman's files. Rapp warns Ross not to interfere with the war on terror. His words fall on deaf ears, though, and Ross decides that he must fire Rapp. Since Rapp has the president's full support, Ross decides he has to do it carefully.

Later, Rapp injures his left knee during a morning jog, and encounters the assassins Gould and Claudia, both dressed as bicyclists, examining his house. Rapp doesn't suspect anything and continues limping back towards his house. The next day, Rapp undergoes arthroscopic knee surgery. He and his wife Anna come home and as they settle down in their house, Louis detonates a bomb that kills Anna and throws a severely wounded Rapp into Chesapeake Bay where he is saved by a nearby boater. The CIA fakes Rapp's death and takes him to a safehouse to recuperate.

In a secret meeting with Irene Kennedy, Director of the CIA, President Hayes tells Kennedy that Rapp has his consent to kill any and all people involved in the murder of his wife.

Saudi Prince Rashid, who is visiting U.S., finds out from Director Ross that Rapp is in fact not dead. Ross carelessly informs Rashid of Rapp's safehouse location. Rashid orders his assistant, Saudi intelligence agent Nawaf Tayyib, to kill Rapp and Abel. Tayyib hires Latino gang leader Anibal Castillo to kill Rapp at the safehouse. Tayyib then goes hunting for the go-between Abel with two of his men, to sever the chain of contacts leading back to the prince.

Castillo and thirteen of his men attack the safehouse. Rapp kills all of Castillo's men, then wounds Castillo and brings him in to be questioned. Through different leads Rapp discovers Saeed was the one who put a bounty on his head.

Rapp goes to Afghanistan and gets Waheed out of prison, giving Waheed the impression that it is a hostage exchange. Rapp has Waheed unknowingly wear a vest full of explosives. As the released Waheed embraces his father in the street, Rapp pulls out a detonator and blows Saeed and Waheed and twelve of Saeed's bodyguards to pieces.

The CIA in the meantime has found out about Erich Abel's role in hiring the assassins and sends Rapp to Abel's office. There Rapp finds Tayyib torturing Abel's secretary for information on Abel's whereabouts. Rapp kills Tayyib's men, and he and Coleman capture Tayyib. A conscience-stricken Claudia is revealed to be the one who gave the CIA information on Abel.

Abel's secretary reveals to Rapp and Coleman that Abel is in Austria. Rapp flies there and captures Abel at his mountain retreat and tortures him for information. Abel reveals that Rashid was the mastermind behind the plot. He also gives information on the assassins. After hearing this, Rapp, who has become much more violent and vengeful after the killing of his wife, burns Abel alive inside the house.

Rapp travels to Spain where Rashid is staying. Coleman bribes Rashid's guards, who are British SAS sympathetic to Rapp, to let them in. Rapp completely covers Tayyib's body with explosives and drops him off in front of the mosque where Rashid is staying. Once Rashid's personal guards have Tayyib in custody, Rapp detonates the explosives, killing Tayyib and all the guards. Rapp finds Rashid and beats him severely before he puts a phosphorus grenade in his mouth and pulls the pin, melting Rashid's head.

In the epilogue, set nine months later, Rapp trails Louis and Claudia to Tahiti. Claudia has had her baby and Louis has retired. Rapp aims a gun at Louis's head, but once he hears that the baby was named after his deceased wife, he realizes she would not want her death avenged like this. He turns and leaves Louis, Claudia, and Anna unharmed. He then throws the gun into the ocean and continues walking down the boardwalk outside.

== Film adaptation ==
In a radio interview on the Hugh Hewitt show on February 6, 2009, Vince Flynn disclosed that he has signed a movie deal for this book to be the first of the Mitch Rapp books to make it to the big screen. The screenplay was written by Jonathan Lemkin but it had not yet been picked up by a studio. On January 1, 2010, Variety announced that Antoine Fuqua (Training Day, Shooter, Olympus Has Fallen) would direct a planned adaptation of Consent to Kill for CBS Films with Lorenzo DiBonaventura and Nick Wechsler producing.

Though CBS Films has expressed interest in Gerard Butler, Colin Farrell and Matthew Fox as possible candidates for Mitch Rapp Teen Wolf alum Dylan O'Brien subsequently won the part by 2016 for the movie adaptation of American Assassin.
