= The Handler =

The Handler may refer to:

- The Handler (TV series), a TV series
- The Handler (album), a 2004 album by Har Mar Superstar
- The Handler (novel), 2022 novel by M. P. Woodward
- "The Handler" (song), a 2015 song by Muse
- The Handler, a character from the Netflix adaptation of The Umbrella Academy.
