= Henry McMahon (disambiguation) =

Henry McMahon may refer to:

- Henry McMahon (diplomat) (1862–1949), diplomat known for the McMahon Line and the McMahon-Hussein Correspondence
- Henry McMahon, member of the band Big Tom and The Mainliners
- A fictional character in the 1997 book Term Limits by Vince Flynn
