= Lemkin =

Lemkin is a surname. Notable people with the surname include:

- Raphael Lemkin, Polish Jewish lawyer who is known for coining the term genocide
- Stav Lemkin, Israeli professional footballer
- Jonathan Lemkin, American screenwriter
