= Don Bentley =

American novelist

- Born: August 25, 1974 (age 52); Waterbury, Connecticut, U.S.
- Occupation: Writer
- Writing career
- Genres: Thriller, war fiction
- Notable works: Without Sanction; Tom Clancy: Target Acquired; Capture or Kill
- Website: donbentleybooks.com

Don Bentley (born August 25, 1974) is an American novelist. He is known for the Jack Ryan Jr. novels, which are part of the Ryanverse featuring characters created by Tom Clancy, as well as his own Matt Drake series. He is currently the writer of the Mitch Rapp series of novels, originally by Vince Flynn.

== Early life ==
Bentley graduated from Ohio State University with a bachelor's degree in electrical and computer engineering. He also graduated from Seton Hill University with a master's degree in fine arts.

== Career ==
Bentley served as a United States Army Apache helicopter pilot while stationed in South Korea, Germany, and Texas. He also served in Afghanistan. After his military service, he joined the Federal Bureau of Investigation as a special agent.

Bentley released his debut novel, Without Sanction, in 2020. Featuring the character Matt Drake, it was based on Bentley's own experiences in the military and the FBI. It was followed by The Outside Man (2021), Hostile Intent (2022), and Forgotten War (2023).

Bentley was approached by Tom Clancy’s longtime editor Tom Colgan about writing the Jack Ryan Jr. series of novels, succeeding Mike Maden. His debut, Tom Clancy: Target Acquired, was released in 2021. It was followed by Tom Clancy: Zero Hour (2022), Tom Clancy: Flash Point, and Tom Clancy: Weapons Grade (both 2023). In 2024, Bentley exited the series and was succeeded by M. P. Woodward.

Bentley took over for Kyle Mills as the author of the Mitch Rapp series of novels, originally written by Vince Flynn. His debut, Capture or Kill, was released in 2024. It was followed by Denied Access (2025) and Double Tap (2026).

== Bibliography ==
=== Matt Drake series ===
- Without Sanction (2020)
- The Outside Man (2021)
- Hostile Intent (2022)
- Forgotten War (2023)

=== Jack Ryan Jr. series ===
Featuring characters created by Tom Clancy

- Tom Clancy: Target Acquired (2021)
- Tom Clancy: Zero Hour (2022)
- Tom Clancy: Flash Point (2023)
- Tom Clancy: Weapons Grade (2023)

=== Mitch Rapp series ===
Featuring characters created by Vince Flynn

- Capture or Kill (2024)
- Denied Access (2025)
- Double Tap (2026)

=== Short stories ===
- "Flesh and Blood" - From Audible Original short story collection Pursuit (October 2026)
