= Memorial Day (novel) =

2004 political thriller novel by Vince Flynn

- Author: Vince Flynn
- Language: English
- Genre: Political thriller
- Publication date: May 2004
- Publication place: United States
- Media type: Print (hardback & paperback)
- Pages: 416 pp (hardcover) 608 pp (paperback)
- Preceded by: Executive Power
- Followed by: Consent to Kill

Memorial Day is thriller novel by Vince Flynn, and the seventh to feature Mitch Rapp, an American CIA agent that works for the counter-terrorism unit "Orion Team".

== Plot summary ==
Intelligence gathering has indicated unusual activity in financial markets, and Rapp, back in the field after a long stint on desk duty for insubordination, unearths a bomb plot during a daring commando raid on an al-Qaeda stronghold in Afghanistan. A decision is made for the President and his cabinet to leave Washington, D.C. in early morning hours based on the bomb threat. However a United States strike force manages to intercept and disarm the nuclear weapon moments after it arrives by freighter in Charleston, South Carolina. Everyone, including series stalwart President Robert Hayes, congratulates themselves on a job well done, but Rapp is not convinced; he believes al-Qaeda leader Mustafa al-Yamani has smuggled a second nuclear weapon into the country and plans to detonate it in Washington, D.C., during Memorial Day celebrations. Rapp, a ruthless terrorist pursuer by temperament and training, turns it up several notches this time around, following al-Yamani's scent with feverish abandon. When a missing Pakistani nuclear scientist is found to have passed through LAX on his way to Atlanta, and a truck driver turns up dead due to radiation sickness, the chase is on again. Ultimately the terrorists approach Washington D.C. by water, are spotted from the air, and killed by Rapp. The second bomb, however, has been activated and is in its countdown, unable to be deactivated. After an assessment of options, Rapp transports the bomb to a secure underground facility where it explodes with minimal human or environmental affect.
