= Executive Power =

2003 political thriller novel by Vince Flynn

- Author: Vince Flynn
- Language: English
- Genre: Political thriller
- Publisher: Atria Books
- Publication date: May 2003
- Publication place: United States
- Media type: Print (hardback & paperback)
- Pages: 384 pp (hardcover) 512 pp (paperback)
- Preceded by: Separation of Power
- Followed by: Memorial Day

Executive Power is a thriller novel by Vince Flynn, and the sixth to feature Mitch Rapp, an American agent that works for the CIA as an operative for a covert counter terrorism unit called the "Orion Team".

The audiobook is narrated by American voice actor George Guidall.

== Plot summary ==
After Mitch Rapp's cover is blown following his last assignment, preventing Saddam Hussein from obtaining nuclear weapons, he is removed from operation duties and given the role of a counter-terrorism advisor to CIA director Irene Kennedy. Upon returning from his honeymoon with his newly-wedded wife Anna Reilly, Rapp travels to D.C after a Navy SEAL team attempting to rescue an American family (the Andersons) held hostage in the Philippines is ambushed by Abu Sayyaf terrorists, killing two operatives. Its revealed by Kennedy to President Hayes that the Assistant Secretary of State illegally emailed the details of the operation to the U.S. Ambassador to the Philippines, who forwarded the operations details to the Filipino President, which then went to Philippine Army General Moro, who is being bribed by Abu Sayyaf and the Chinese. Rapp conceives a plan to deal with General Moro and rescue the family, volunteering himself to travel to the Philippines and oversee the operation, which Kennedy approves of as long as he doesn't involve himself directly.

While this is occurring, in Monte Carlo, a Palestinian-American assassin named "David" meets with Prince Omar, a wealthy and radical member of the House of Saud, whose paying David to help create a new Palestinian state. To start the plot, David travels to Amman to meet with General Hamza, head of the Al-Amn al-Khas, Saddam Hussein's secret police, to collect Iraqi funds for Palestinian terror groups. However, upon collecting the money, David breaks into Hamzas hotel room and tortures him to death, saving a young girl he was sexually assaulting in the process.

In the Philippines, Rapp goes to meet with Scott Coleman and Charlie Wicker, former Navy SEALS and members of a private military group, in order to execute his plan. Rapp meets with General Moro under the guise of a negotiator for the American government, but instead, he lures Moro out to be killed by Wicker with a sniper, allowing him to convince his men it was Abu Sayyaf. While finding a vantage point to kill Moro in the jungle, Coleman and Wicker discover Abu Sayyaf moving the Andersons and follow them to the location of their camp.

After killing General Hamza, David travels to Jerusalem to meet Mossad director Ben Freidman, who wants to use David's delivery of the money to a terrorist meeting as a chance to kill all those attending. David, seeing this an opportunity to gain vengeance on those who tortured him as a child, travels to a compound in Hebron where a high-level meeting between the leadership of groups like the PLO, Hezbollah, and Hamas is taking place. David destroys much of the compound using explosives laced within the money cases, but Freidman, not trusting of David, destroys the rest of the compound and much of the surrounding homes in an airstrike, killing dozens of civilians and almost killing David.

After killing Moro, the Navy decides to launch another operation to rescue the Andersons, which Rapp volunteers to lead. The operation goes well and the Andersons are rescued, but Rapp is shot during the rescue. Upon his return home, Reilly discovers Rapp's wound and how he lied about not going back into operation duties, causing her to storm out.

Following the Hebron strike, Israel is internationally condemned for its use of excessive force, and the Palestinian ambassador to the UN protests the Israelis before the General Assembly. Following this, he and his bodyguards are killed by David in New York City, who frames the attack as a hit job by the Israelis. This warrants a massive outcry from Palestinians, who begin launch terrorist attacks in Tel Aviv in retaliation.

After going to arrest the Assistant Secretary of State for her role in the botched rescue operation, Rapp reconciles with Anna, promising to be more truthful about his work in the CIA. After this, he rejoins Kennedy and helps her attempt to track down David. As he does this, the French ambassador to the UN puts forward a peace plan to establish a Palestinian state as a resolution to the crisis. The Saudi ambassador to the U.S. confronts the president, telling him that OPEC will embargo oil shipments to the U.S. if they don't vote for the peace plan at the UN. However, after he leaves, the ambassador is killed by David when a bomb is set off on his motorcades route, putting the US and Israel under more pressure.

Thanks to intelligence from the British, and after strongarming Freidman into giving information about the Hebron strike, the CIA discovers that David and Prince Omar were responsible for the crisis. They also learn through the Princes financial transactions that he bribed the French ambassador to create a peace solution to his liking. Rapp and David both travel to Cannes, France, but David is killed by Omar's bodyguard Chung on Omar's yacht in order to cover up loose ends. However, both Omar and Chung are killed by Rapp after they leave the yacht. After the details of Omar's plot is revealed to the world, the Israelis and Palestinians begin new peace talks after being shamed for the roles they played in the crisis, which President Hayes and Kennedy thank Rapp for resolving.
