= Weapons Grade =

2023 novel by Don Bentley

- Author: Don Bentley
- Audio read by: Scott Brick
- Language: English
- Series: Jack Ryan Jr.
- Release number: 11
- Genre: Techno-thriller; Crime fiction; Military fiction; Realistic fiction
- Publisher: G.P. Putnam's Sons
- Publication date: September 5, 2023
- Publication place: United States
- Media type: Print (hardcover), Audio, eBook
- Pages: 512
- ISBN: 9780593422816
- Preceded by: Flash Point
- Followed by: Shadow State

Weapons Grade (stylized as Tom Clancy Weapons Grade or Tom Clancy: Weapons Grade) is a techno-thriller novel, written by Don Bentley and released on September 5, 2023. It is his fourth and final book in the Jack Ryan Jr. series, which is part of the Ryanverse featuring characters created by Tom Clancy. Weapons Grade is the second of two books by Bentley featuring Jack to be published in the same year, the other being Flash Point.

In the novel, Jack investigates a cold case after witnessing a car accident turned professional hit in Texas. It debuted at number eight on the New York Times bestseller list.

== Plot summary ==
Jack Ryan Jr. witnesses a car accident while driving at Briar Wood in Texas. When he pulls over to help, he finds himself in a gunfight between South African mercenaries led by Leon Kruger and the driver of one of the vehicles, who later dies from his wounds. After being briefly interrogated by a local detective named Bradshaw, Jack finds a note from the driver with details on a meeting with a woman named Amanda.

Jack meets Amanda, who has information for the dead driver named Jeff Wellington about his son Troy's disappearance four months ago. Reported by local police to be a drug addict when he vanished, Amanda believes Troy was sober when he stopped at a gas station she worked at the day of his disappearance. Jack accompanies Amanda as they track down her teenage daughter Bella to a restaurant, where he is abducted and drugged by Leon and his men.

Jack wakes up on the train tracks and narrowly escapes being run over. He is then captured by Bradshaw, revealed to be a corrupt cop working for Leon who had killed Amanda's patrolman boyfriend Brian. Jack later escapes from Leon's men and meets with Amanda, who tells him that Leon had kidnapped Bella for her silence. Jack checks into a motel to lure the mercenaries as he sends a duress code to his Campus associates.

Meanwhile, an Israeli special forces team discovers a secret uranium enrichment facility at Saghand in Iran. Director of national intelligence Mary Pat Foley informs U.S. President Jack Ryan, who tasks an experimental unmanned combat aerial vehicle (UCAV) operated by SR-71 Blackbird pilot Bob Behler to surgically strike the heavily guarded facility. However, the UCAV was hacked, with its flight path headed for Texas.

Campus operative Lisanne Robertson, also on vacation in Texas with Jack, responds to her fiancé's duress code and meets with Green Beret snipers Cary Marks and Jad Mustafa, who were on a separate Campus mission in Las Vegas. Setting out to find Jack, they meet ex-Green Beret Isaac Black and former Black Hawk helicopter pilot Kyle Hogan, co-owners of a private company specializing in aerial hog hunting trips, whom Jack had hired to track him from a helicopter when Leon's men kidnapped him at the motel.

With Isaac and Kyle providing overwatch, Lisanne and the Green Berets rescue Jack and Bella from Leon's men and a pair of MS-13 gang members hired to kill them. Jack is then tasked by Mary Pat with intercepting the UCAV as it is guided towards a high-altitude balloon guarded by Leon and his remaining henchmen a few miles away at Widow's Peak. As the Green Berets and Isaac engage in a gunfight with Leon and his men, Jack and Kyle fly towards the balloon where Jack shoots its communications antenna, allowing Behler to regain control of the UCAV, which proceeds to Iran and bombs the enrichment facility.

Bella is reunited with Amanda, while Bradshaw is arrested by his colleagues. Jack and Lisanne decide to take care of her teenage niece Emily after her mother and Lisanne's sister goes to rehab.

== Characters ==
=== United States government ===
- Jack Ryan: President of the United States
- Mary Pat Foley: Director of national intelligence
- Arnold "Arnie" van Damm: White House chief of staff

=== The Campus ===
- John Clark: Director of operations
- Domingo "Ding" Chavez: Assistant director of operations
- Gavin Biery: Director of information technology
- Jack Ryan Jr.: Operations officer / senior analyst
- Lisanne Robertson: Former director of transportation
- Master Sergeant Cary Marks
- Sergeant First Class Jad Mustafa

=== Israeli Defense Forces Special Operations Team ===
- Elad Morag: Team leader
- Nimrod Diskin: Second-in-command
- David Miller: Drone operator
- Yossi Cohn: Sniper
- Benny Kokia: Communications expert

=== United States military ===
- General Clyde Woltman: Chairman of the Joint Chiefs of Staff
- Colonel Bob "Lorenzo" Behler: SR-71 pilot
- Charlie: SR-71 sensor operator
- Shannon Kent: Air Force Special Projects Office

=== In Texas ===
- Leon Kruger: Mercenary leader
- Hendricks: Mercenary
- Officer Bradshaw: Detective with Briar Wood PD
- Brian: Patrolman with Briar Wood PD
- Amanda: An eyewitness
- Bella: Her daughter
- Isaac Black: Former Third Special Forces Group Green Beret
- Kyle Hogan: Former Army Black Hawk helicopter pilot

== Development ==
In an interview with WECT, Bentley recalled that he wanted to write a small-scale story set in Texas after writing the previous novel Flash Point. "My son goes to Texas A&M, and I spend a lot of time driving through these small towns, and each small town has a Pizza Hut, a Dairy Queen and a brand new credit union. I’m like, ‘Why do they have that brand new credit union? What’s going on there?’ So, that's the book I sat down to write," he said. Bentley based the Iran and hypersonic airliner plotlines on current events, particularly with the startup company Hermeus.

== Reception ==
=== Commercial ===
The book debuted at number eight on the Combined Print and E-Book Fiction category of the New York Times bestseller list for the week of September 24, 2023, as well as number eleven on the Hardcover Fiction category of the same list. It charted at number four on the Mass Market Books category of the same list in August 2024.

=== Critical ===
Thriller novel reviewer The Real Book Spy praised the novel as a "worthy addition to the Ryanverse and a fitting end to the Don Bentley era", adding that the author "has shown to be a masterful storyteller, adept at crafting intricate plots that intertwine global politics, cutting-edge technology, and heart-stopping action". Kirkus Reviews gave a mixed verdict: "Lots of violent action with little payoff."
