= Shadow State =

2024 novel by M. P. Woodward

- Author: M. P. Woodward
- Audio read by: Scott Brick
- Language: English
- Series: Jack Ryan Jr.
- Release number: 12
- Genre: Techno-thriller; Military fiction; Realistic fiction
- Publisher: G.P. Putnam's Sons
- Publication date: August 20, 2024
- Publication place: United States
- Media type: Print (hardcover), Audio, eBook
- Pages: 384
- ISBN: 9780593717943
- Preceded by: Weapons Grade
- Followed by: Line of Demarcation

Shadow State (stylized as Tom Clancy Shadow State or Tom Clancy: Shadow State) is a techno-thriller novel, written by M. P. Woodward and released on August 20, 2024. It is his first book in the Jack Ryan Jr. series, which is part of the Ryanverse featuring characters created by Tom Clancy.

In the novel, Jack uncovers a conspiracy while working in Vietnam. It debuted at number ten on the New York Times bestseller list.

== Plot summary ==
Jack Ryan Jr. goes to Hong Kong on a "white-side" assignment for Hendley Associates with chief investment officer Howard Brennan to finance their acquisition of GeoTech, a rare earth mining and refining company. He also receives a note from a mysterious woman asking for a meeting. Jack is about to meet her at a night market when he is attacked by a Laotian thug, whom he kills after a struggle. The next day, Jack and Howard reach an agreement with a bank on financing the GeoTech acquisition. They meet GeoTech's CEO Bruce Stephenson and its president of Vietnamese operations David Highsmith in Ho Chi Minh City, Vietnam before going to their headquarters in Da Nang, where Jack does a due diligence audit.

The Campus operations director John Clark recruits disgraced former Navy SEAL master chief Kendrick Moore to the organization in a provisional role. Kendrick goes to Mindanao in the Philippines to assist Campus analyst and Jack's fiancée Lisanne Robertson and Green Beret snipers Cary Marks and Jad Mustafa in apprehending Abu Sayyaf terrorist Adnan Al Sheikh, who had plotted to assassinate the president of the Philippines under Chinese orders. Cary kills Al Sheikh and encounters his men, who are then dispatched by Kendrick as they escape their compound.

During his audit, Jack finds inconsistencies in expense reports for GeoTech's samarium mining sites in Lay Tao and requests a visit there. This attracts the attention of Laotian MSS non-official cover agent Colonel Cai Qi, who orders his asset Highsmith to prevent Jack from jeopardizing the GeoTech acquisition in exchange for his promotion to acting CEO. Meanwhile, the U.S. Air Force successfully tests an experimental stealth pod named UMBRA, developed by defense contractor Quantum Atomics using rare earth magnets from GeoTech, unaware that Chinese radars can identify the pod through Cai's penetration of GeoTech.

The next day, Stephenson flies Jack and Howard to Lay Tao in a restored Vietnam War-era Huey helicopter, which crashes near the Cả River. Jack tries to save Stephenson, who dies when the helicopter crashes off a cliff. Cai is tasked by his MSS handler with hunting down Jack and Howard through the Snakehead smuggling gang, while Clark deploys the Campus team to Vietnam to rescue them. Jack and Howard are briefly captured by Snakehead gang members and brought upriver to nearby Laos, where they break free and escape. They meet former Montagnard soldier Alang Nik Trong, who informs them of a Snakehead base trafficking young women from his village. Meanwhile, the Campus team uses Stephenson's restored Vietnam War-era river patrol boat to locate Jack and Howard, later rescuing them from Snakehead gang members trying to kill them.

Jack and the Campus team go to Highsmith's plantation house in Huế to confront his brother-in-law Henri Claré and his wife Marie Anh (who had contacted Jack in Hong Kong) about their involvement in the helicopter crash. Henri confesses to placing Semtex on the helicopter, while Marie Anh informs Jack that the Claré family was forced to do business with the Snakehead gang when the samarium deposits were first discovered on their territory, in exchange for allowing the gang to continue their sex trafficking operation. She later calls Highsmith, who informs Cai. Cai and his Snakehead henchman Ling infiltrate the plantation and briefly capture Jack and Lisanne before they are apprehended by Cary and Kendrick.

A few days later, Jack, Lisanne, and Kendrick go to Highsmith’s office in Da Nang to confront him about his involvement with the Snakehead gang and the Chinese. Jack blackmails him into becoming a double agent for the Campus, as they continue to uncover Chinese involvement with criminal elements in Laos and Venezuela. His father, U.S. President Jack Ryan, later orders the Snakehead base in Laos destroyed and gives Kendrick his SEAL trident back.

== Characters ==
=== U.S. government officials and Campus operatives ===
- Jack Ryan, Sr.: President of the United States, founder of The Campus
- Mary Pat Foley: Director of national intelligence, advisor to The Campus
- Arnie van Damm: White House chief of staff
- Jack Ryan, Jr.: The President's son, a Campus team leader
- John Clark: Operations director of The Campus
- Lisanne Robertson: Campus intelligence and logistics coordinator
- Cary Marks: Campus operator, active-duty Green Beret master sergeant
- Jad Mustafa: Campus operator, active-duty Green Beret sergeant first class
- Kendrick Moore: Navy SEAL master chief (retired), provisional Campus operator
- Gavin Biery: Campus director of information technology

=== Hendley Associates and GeoTech Corporation ===
- Gerry Hendley: President and CEO of Hendley Associates, a private equity firm
- Howard Brennan: Chief investment officer, Hendley Associates
- Bruce Stephenson: CEO of GeoTech, a rare earth mining and refining company
- David Highsmith: GeoTech's president of Vietnamese operations

=== Vietnamese and Laotian characters ===
- Colonel Cai Qi: Nonofficial cover agent of China's Ministry of State Security (MSS) in Laos
- Ling and Twei: Cai's top two deputies, members of the Laotian Snakehead gang
- Madame Marie Anh Claré: Sister-in-law of David Highsmith in Hué, Vietnam
- Henri Claré: Madame Anh's husband
- Alang Nik Trong: Former Montagnard soldier allied with the U.S. Military Assistance Command, Vietnam (MACV)

== Reception ==
=== Commercial ===
The book debuted at number ten at both the Combined Print and E-Book Fiction and Hardcover Fiction categories of the New York Times bestseller list for the week of September 8, 2024. It charted at number seven on the Mass Market Books category of the same list in August 2025.

=== Critical ===
Thriller novel reviewer The Real Book Spy praised the book: "Mixing action, intrigue, and political drama to create a fast-paced, high-stakes thriller that jumps off the page and demands your attention, M.P. Woodward gives Jack Ryan fans exactly what they’ve been asking for." The Big Thrill reviewed the book: "It delivers all the classic Clancy feels—terrifying tech, exciting action, and powerful characters who show their true heart and unstoppable bravery."
