= Zero Hour (Bentley novel) =

2022 novel by Don Bentley

- Author: Don Bentley
- Audio read by: Scott Brick
- Language: English
- Series: Jack Ryan Jr.
- Release number: 9
- Genre: Techno-thriller; Spy fiction; Military fiction; Realistic fiction
- Publisher: G.P. Putnam's Sons
- Publication date: June 7, 2022
- Publication place: United States
- Media type: Print (Hardcover), Audio, eBook
- Pages: 496
- ISBN: 9780593422724
- Preceded by: Target Acquired
- Followed by: Flash Point

Zero Hour (stylized as Tom Clancy Zero Hour or Tom Clancy: Zero Hour) is a techno-thriller novel, written by Don Bentley and released on June 7, 2022. It is his second book in the Jack Ryan Jr. series, which is part of the Ryanverse featuring characters created by Tom Clancy.

In the novel, Jack races against time to stop a second Korean War after the Supreme Leader of North Korea is incapacitated. It debuted at number eight on the New York Times bestseller list.

== Plot summary ==
Supreme Leader of North Korea Choi Ha-guk is incapacitated after a test accident involving an experimental Russian nuclear missile at the Musudan-ri missile test facility. Politburo member Eun Pak takes advantage of the opportunity to stage a coup and initiate a full-scale invasion of South Korea, preceded by teams of North Korean special operations forces (KPASOF) infiltrating the country to perform acts of sabotage. Pak also takes Ha-guk's sister Mesun, who had been present at the failed missile test along with a delegation of Russian scientists, as a hostage.

Jack Ryan, Jr. goes to Seoul, South Korea, with fellow Campus operative Lisanne Robertson to interview potential Campus recruit Isabel Yang. He finds himself in the middle of a riot orchestrated by a team of KPASOF forces who detonate an ambulance, killing several protesters as the entire country is placed on lockdown. Jack later meets Isabel, who tells him that she had received a cryptic message from Russian doctor and former college roommate Kira Sidorova telling her to run.

With the help of Campus IT director Gavin Biery, Jack pinpoints Kira's last location to the Musudan-ri test facility, where she had been part of the Russian delegation. He is also contacted by an unknown party through the scientist, who informs him of an impending attack at the Port of Busan. Jack informs Campus operations director John Clark, who tasks him with investigating and stopping the attacks.

Regrouping with Lisanne at a nearby hotel, Jack and Isabel encounter Green Beret snipers Cary Marks and Jad Mustafa, who had previously crossed paths with Jack in Syria and had also evaded North Korean operators engaging in assassinations while participating in an urban training exercise in Seoul. Leaving Isabel with Lisanne, Jack proceeds to the Port of Busan with Cary and Jad, arriving too late to stop a chemical attack during a riot outside an American bioweapons laboratory but managing to shoot the delivery device into the nearby sea. The unknown caller identifies herself as Mesun, who tells Jack about the coup and the invasion plans.

After informing Clark, Jack infiltrates the Musudan-ri missile test facility with Cary and Jad and a Navy SEAL platoon. He rescues Kira from North Korean guards who attempt to rape her. The Navy SEALs later intercept a second nuclear missile nearby as Pak prepares to launch it, leaving Jack to track down Mesun, who had escaped the facility, as Cary and Jad provide overwatch.

Jack finds Mesun and accompanies her to the missile control room, where she convinces the assembling generals to stop mechanized infantry and armored divisions from reaching the Korean Demilitarized Zone before she is shot by Pak. Jack then pursues and kills the Politburo member and links up with Cary and Jad, who had prevented the nuclear missile from launching by flying a kamikaze drone into its launcher. They are later rescued by Night Stalkers from being overrun by remaining North Korean forces at the test facility.

The Supreme Leader later recovers and calls for the North Korean special operations forces still in South Korea to return to their country. Jack returns to Washington, D.C. two weeks later and reunites with Lisanne.

== Characters ==
=== United States government ===
- Jack Ryan: President of the United States
- Mary Pat Foley: Director of national intelligence

=== The Campus ===
- John Clark: Director of operations
- Domingo "Ding" Chavez: Assistant director of operations
- Gavin Biery: Director of information technology
- Jack Ryan, Jr.: Operations officer / senior analyst
- Lisanne Robertson: Former director of transportation

=== Operational Detachment Alpha 555 ===
- Captain Alex Brown
- Master Sergeant Cary Marks
- Sergeant First Class Jad Mustafa

=== 1-6th Cavalry Squadron ===
- Lieutenant Mike Reese
- Chief Warrant Officer Three Kassi Shaw
- Chief Warrant Officer Three Jay Hogg
- Chief Warrant Officer Todd Askins
- Chief Warrant Officer Matt Isaacson
- Chief Warrant Officer Buddy Auten
- Chief Warrant Officer Ron Thompson
- Chief Warrant Officer Damon Nicolas
- Lieutenant Colonel J.D. Jack

=== Democratic People's Republic of Korea leadership ===
- Choi Ha-guk: Chairman, Democratic People's Republic of Korea, Supreme Leader
- Choi Mesun: Sister of the Supreme Leader
- Eun Pak: Member of the Politburo
- General Il-seong Pyo: Chief of the general staff of the Korean People's Army

=== Other characters ===
- Dr. Cathy Ryan: First Lady of the United States
- Isabel Yang: Potential Campus helper
- Kira Sidorova: Russian scientist
- Lieutenant Brandon Cates: United States Navy SEAL

== Reception ==
=== Commercial ===
The book debuted at number eight on the Combined Print and E-Book Fiction category of the New York Times bestseller list for the week of June 26, 2022, as well as number two on the Hardcover Fiction category of the same list. It charted at number three on the Mass Market Books category of the same list in April 2023.

=== Critical ===
Publishers Weekly reviewed the book: "Readers will find all the operational and technical details they’ve come to expect from a Tom Clancy book. There’s more than enough deadly action to satisfy any military adventure fan." Thriller novel reviewer The Real Book Spy praised the book as "represent[ing] a new era for Clancy’s readers, one geared more towards action and fast-paced plots that put Jack Junior in unthinkable situations readers will devour".
