= Transfer of Power =

1999 political thriller novel by Vince Flynn

- Paperback edition
- Author: Vince Flynn
- Language: English
- Genre: Political thriller
- Publisher: Pocket Books
- Publication date: July 1, 1999
- Publication place: United States
- Media type: Print (hardback & paperback)
- Preceded by: Term Limits
- Followed by: The Third Option

Transfer of Power is a debut novel by Vince Flynn, and the third to feature Mitch Rapp, the CIA's super agent. The book was released on July 1, 1999 by Pocket Books. It reached number 13 in the New York Times paperback bestsellers chart.

== Plot ==
The novel opens with Mitch Rapp, the CIA's lethal counter-terrorism operative, deeply embedded in a highly dangerous covert operation in Iran. While executing this mission, Rapp uncovers intelligence pointing to an imminent and potentially devastating terrorist attack planned against the United States, specifically targeting Washington, D.C. The intelligence suggests a sophisticated and well-funded group is poised to strike, but the details are still fragmented and incomplete. Rapp knows time is of the essence to prevent this impending catastrophe.

Meanwhile, back in the nation's capital, Anna Reilly, a sharp and ambitious young journalist, is stepping into her eager as a White House correspondent for NBC. It's an executive and moment in her career, full of promise and anticipation. However, her first day quickly takes a nightmarish turn. On this very day, a meticulously planned and shockingly audacious terrorist attack unfolds directly beneath her feet. A highly organized terrorist cell, led by a ruthlessly efficient and ideologically driven commander, infiltrates the White House using a previously unknown and secret access point. The terrorists swiftly seize control of the Executive Mansion, taking numerous hostages, including high-ranking government officials and White House Chief of Staff.

President Hayes narrowly escapes capture, finding refuge but ultimately trapped in the White House's unfinished and vulnerable bomb shelter. In the ensuing chaos, Vice President Sherman Baxter III, a man driven by ambition and political opportunism, sees the crisis as a chance to elevate his own power. He assumes the operative of acting commander-in-chief and begins demonstrating a concerning willingness to appease the terrorists' demands, prioritizing his public image and future political prospects over the safety of the hostages and the security of the nation. His leniency and self-serving political calculations directly conflict with the aggressive action needed to overcome the crisis.

As the situation spirals, Mitch Rapp is urgently recalled from his mission in Iran, and thrust into the heart of the crisis. His mission: infiltrate the White House, before he is to late. He must use his unique skills and brutal efficiency to dismantle the terrorist operation from the inside. During his relentless infiltration of the hostile war, Rapp encounters Anna Reilly. The situation is dire; he is forced to intervene and save her from a brutal assault by one of the terrorists, cementing a bond between them forged in the crucible of the crisis.

While Rapp fights from within, a team of highly trained Navy SEALs is deployed to breach the White House perimeter and provide tactical support. A fierce and bloody battle ensues as the SEALs and Rapp work in tandem to systematically eliminate the terrorists, room by room, and secure the release of the hostages. Finally, they reach the President - but it is not yet over.

Just as the situation appears to be under control, the leader of the terrorist group, a cunning and resourceful adversary, manages to evade capture and escape the White House. Before fleeing, he triggers a series of strategically placed explosive devices, causing significant damage and further chaos.

The hunt for the escaped terrorist leader becomes Rapp's personal vendetta. His investigation leads him on a relentless pursuit that spans continents, eventually culminating in a final confrontation in South America. The final ends with Rapp confronts and eliminates the mastermind behind the White House attack, ensuring that justice is served and the threat is permanently neutralized.

== Characters ==
- Mitch Rapp: A highly skilled CIA operative, Rapp is relentless in his pursuit of justice. He uses both intelligence and force to combat terrorism.
- Rafique Aziz: The main antagonist, he orchestrates the attack on the White House. His cunning plans aim to manipulate political power.
- President Hayes: The President who becomes a hostage. His decisions are crucial to the unfolding crisis.
- Vice President Sherman Baxter: Inexperienced and political, he struggles to handle the crisis effectively.
- Milt Adams: A retired Secret Service agent who assists Rapp. His knowledge of the White House proves invaluable.
- Anna Reilly: Mitch's romantic interest and rejected for crisis.

== Critical reaction ==
The Houston Chronicle said "Flynn keeps the action moving". Brandywine Books found it entertaining but lacking as great literature ("In terms of storytelling, his performance is flawless... As a piece of prose writing, the book is less successful."). Publishers Weekly praised Flynn for its "spicy broth of brutal terrorists, heroic commandos and ... secret agent hijinks".

== See also ==
- Peaceful transfer of power
