= Flash Point (Bentley novel) =

2023 novel by Don Bentley

- Author: Don Bentley
- Audio read by: Scott Brick
- Language: English
- Series: Jack Ryan Jr.
- Release number: 10
- Genre: Techno-thriller; Spy fiction; Military fiction; Realistic fiction
- Publisher: G.P. Putnam's Sons
- Publication date: May 23, 2023
- Publication place: United States
- Media type: Print (Hardcover), Audio, eBook
- Pages: 432
- ISBN: 9780593422786
- Preceded by: Zero Hour
- Followed by: Weapons Grade

Flash Point (stylized as Tom Clancy Flash Point or Tom Clancy: Flash Point) is a techno-thriller novel, written by Don Bentley and released on May 23, 2023. It is his third book in the Jack Ryan Jr. series, which is part of the Ryanverse featuring characters created by Tom Clancy. Flash Point is the first of two books by Bentley featuring Ryan to be published in the same year, the other being Weapons Grade.

In the novel, Jack deals with an attack on The Campus from Chinese mercenaries. It debuted at number eight on the New York Times bestseller list.

== Plot summary ==
Jack Ryan, Jr. leads a surveillance operation in Regensburg, Germany with Campus operative Lisanne Robertson and asset Isabel Yang, as Green Beret snipers Cary Marks and Jad Mustafa provide overwatch. They witness a rendition of Chinese expatriate Wang Lei by MSS operatives, whom Jack and the Green Berets unsuccessfully try to apprehend.

Jack finds out that Lei's brother, scientist Zhang Wei, is also in Regensburg, and asks Campus operations director John Clark for authorization to initiate contact. Clark tasks him to go to Manila, Philippines to recover a Chinese undersea glider, but Jack goes ahead with meeting Wei, who is killed by a Chinese sniper. Leaving Lisanne and Yang and fearful about being followed by the MSS, the three proceed to Salzburg, Austria and take separate flights to Manila, where they meet Clark, Campus assistant operations director Domingo "Ding" Chavez, and operative Dominic "Dom" Caruso.

Clark and Ding meet with Filipino banker Mario Reyes in a warehouse at the Navotas fish port to retrieve the glider, as Dom, Jack, and the Green Berets provide overwatch. They are attacked by Chinese mercenaries also after the glider, ending in an explosion that injures Ding and Dom as they kidnap Clark. The leader of the mercenaries, Fen Li, had been hunting for Jack since his intervention at the MSS's attempted assassination of scientist Dr. Rebecka Schweigart. (Note: As depicted in Target Acquired) Jack informs director of national intelligence Mary Pat Foley, who sends a CIA extraction team for Ding and Dom and tells Jack's father, U.S. President Jack Ryan. He orders The Campus to be integrated into the U.S. intelligence community as they work to rescue Clark, who had been tortured by Abu Sayyaf pirates working with Fen.

Meanwhile, a P-8 Poseidon reconnaissance aircraft crashes into the South China Sea after colliding with a Chinese J-16 fighter plane. President Ryan instructs the Virginia-class attack submarine USS Delaware to rescue its crew, evading a Chinese Type 054A frigate after a tense standoff. As other Chinese frigates gather near Taiwan after having failed to capture the P-8's crew, Mary Pat discovers the maneuver as a diversion; Fen and her mercenaries had also staked a claim on a deposit of polymetallic nodules along the Paracel Islands. She relays this information to President Ryan, who informs Chinese President Chen; the latter agrees to turn back the Chinese frigates and assist in rescuing Clark.

After unsuccessfully using the glider to locate Clark, Jack and the Green Berets pinpoint his location to a Vietnamese trawler at South China Sea. With Mario piloting the seaplane, Jack dispatches the Abu Sayyaf pirates and rescues Clark from being hanged by Fen, whom he shoots dead. They escape the trawler as it is engulfed by flames. Ding and Dom later recover. Jack proposes to Lisanne, who accepts.

== Characters ==
=== United States government ===
- Jack Ryan: President of the United States
- Mary Pat Foley: Director of national intelligence
- Arnold "Arnie" van Damm: President Ryan's chief of staff
- Scott Adler: Secretary of state
- Robert Burgess: Secretary of defense

=== The Campus ===
- John Clark: Director of operations
- Domingo "Ding" Chavez: Assistant director of operations
- Dominic "Dom" Caruso: Operations officer
- Gavin Biery: Director of information technology
- Lisanne Robertson: Former director of transportation
- Jack Ryan, Jr.: Operations officer / senior analyst

=== USS Delaware ===
- Commander Christina Dixon: Skipper
- Senior Chief Petty Officer Bill Davis: Sonar technician
- Lieutenant Commander Dan Young: Executive officer

=== P-8 Poseidon ===
- Lieutenant Tom McGrath: Pilot-in-command
- Lieutenant Junior Grade Jack Stewart: Copilot
- Lieutenant Commander Vinnie Shorts: Naval flight officer

=== Chinese characters ===
- Fen Li: Chief executive officer of the HAZ Corporation
- Aiguo Wu: Member of the Central Committee of the Chinese Communist Party
- President Chen: President of China

=== Other characters ===
- Dr. Cathy Ryan: First Lady of the United States
- Isabel Yang: Potential Campus helper
- Master Sergeant Cary Marks: Operational Detachment Alpha 555
- Sergeant First Class Jad Mustafa: Operational Detachment Alpha 555
- Mario Reyes: CIA asset

== Reception ==
=== Commercial ===
The book debuted at number eight on the Combined Print and E-Book Fiction category of the New York Times bestseller list for the week of June 11, 2023, as well as number nine on the Hardcover Fiction category of the same list. It charted at number two on the Mass Market Books category of the same list in April 2024.

=== Critical ===
Thriller novel reviewer The Real Book Spy praised the book: "Fast-paced with a smart plot that feels all too plausible in today’s world, Don Bentley serves up his best Jack Ryan novel to date." Kirkus Reviews reviewed the novel: "A well-turned, if predictable, installment in the popular series."
