= Dead Drop (novel) =

2023 thriller novel by M. P. Woodward

- First edition cover
- Author: M. P. Woodward
- Audio read by: Jon Lindstrom
- Language: English
- Series: Handler
- Release number: 2
- Genre: Spy thriller
- Publisher: Berkley Books
- Publication date: May 23, 2023
- Publication place: United States
- Media type: Print (Hardcover), Audio, eBook
- Pages: 464
- ISBN: 9780593441664
- Preceded by: The Handler

Dead Drop is a spy thriller by M. P. Woodward, published on May 23, 2023 by Berkley Books. A sequel to The Handler (2022), it follows CIA officer Meredith Morris-Dale and her ex-husband John Dale as they work with Mossad to stop Hezbollah from acquiring nuclear weapons from Iran.

== Plot summary ==
In Beirut, Lebanon, a Mossad operations (Caesarea) team led by Maya Shaheen prepares to snatch Iranian scientist Mohammed “Mo” Baramzedeh, who was suspected of developing Taniyn nuclear-tipped cruise missiles and supplying them to Hezbollah. When he skips his meeting with Shaheen, her superior Werner Davidai decides to eliminate him in a bombing, jeopardizing nuclear arms talks in Vienna, Austria involving the United States and Iran.

Senior CIA officer Meredith Morris-Dale is tasked with investigating Davidai’s information about Iran supplying Hezbollah with Taniyn missiles for a National Intelligence Estimate (NIE) to present to the Vienna arms talks. She reaches out to Quds Force lieutenant colonel Kasem Kahlidi, who had defected to the U.S. under the codename Atlas and is being pursued by his former employers as well as Caesarea. Kahlidi demands the safety of his girlfriend Kasra Khani, who was abducted by Hezbollah operatives ordered by Iranian intelligence (MOIS) in London, before he could share information on the missiles.

Meredith asks her ex-husband, former CIA operative John Dale, to talk to Kasem and inform him about Kasra’s abduction. He meets him at a safe house in rural Virginia when they are attacked by a Caesarea team. John and Kasem escape on horseback, but the Iranian kicks John off the horse. Kasem then reaches out to a Saudi contact who offers him safe passage to London. He tracks down Kasra’s ex-fiance Doctor Ramin “Roger” Guljarani, who was forced by Hezbollah operatives to treat her wound after the abduction resulted in a shootout with local police, seeking Kasra’s location.

Meredith goes to Beirut to continue her investigation. She surveils a suspected Taniyn smuggling convoy, which is also monitored by Davidai and Shaheen. Davidai orders the convoy destroyed in another bombing, injuring a CIA paramilitary team tailing the convoy and further ruining Israel’s reputation in the arms talks. Meredith is fired from the NIE and learns that her ex-husband may have been compromised by Mossad through Maya, whom she thought was his former lover; John had worked with her and Davidai on a joint operation at Sharm El Sheikh in Egypt six years ago.

John goes to London and tracks down Kasra’s location at a public housing estate through Guljarani. Kasem, who had also found his girlfriend’s hiding place, fights John. Maya and her team also arrive at the scene and capture Kahlidi, while John manages to rescue Kasra in the resulting shootout with her Hezbollah captors. Unable to contact Meredith, he later reaches out to Maya.

Investigating another lead on the Taniyn warheads, Meredith is abducted by Caesarea and brought in to see Davidai, who lets her speak to Kahlidi. She also meets Maya, who later extracts John and Kasra from London; they decide to work together. Davidai comes up with a plan to return Kahlidi to the Iranians as a CIA asset by creating a story about Meredith being abducted by a Hezbollah splinter group named Août Noir (Black August). Not wanting to jeopardize the Vienna arms deal, Meredith’s superior Ed Rance reaches out to Iranian diplomat and MOIS officer Walid Zafir to facilitate a secret prisoner swap between Meredith and Kasem, to be held at the Beirut-Rafic Hariri International Airport.

MOIS major Siamak Azad, who had led the Iranian hunt for Kahlidi, tracks down Meredith’s location to a Beirut neighborhood and briefly captures her before Maya saves her. Hezbollah cell leader Nabil, who was originally hired to capture and kill Meredith while in Beirut, proceeds to the airport on a van rigged with a bomb to disrupt the prisoner swap. Arriving at the airport, Maya drops Meredith off and crashes her car into Nabil’s van, which blows up and kills her.

Kasem shares intelligence on the status of Iran's nuclear program, which had abandoned the Taniyn project, as Kasra settles into her new life in the U.S. John considers staying in the CIA after previously vowing to retire.

== Characters ==
=== The Americans ===
- Meredith Morris-Dale: Senior operations officer in the CIA’s Counterproliferation Center (CPC); ex-wife of John Dale; alias Maggie O’Dea and Margot Henri
- John Dale: Retiring CIA case officer living in rural Washington State; alias Reza Shariati and Etienne Crochet
- Grace Dale: John and Meredith’s daughter; midshipman at the U.S. Naval Academy
- Ed Rance: Department head of CIA’s CPC; on temporary duty to the diplomatic mission in Vienna, Austria
- Jeff Dorsey: director of CIA’s National Clandestine Service

=== The Israelis ===
- Maya Shaheen: Mossad Operations (Caesarea) officer based in Tel Aviv
- Werner Davidai: Chief of Mossad’s Caesarea operations
- Daniel Mitz: Chief of Mossad’s Junction (covert intelligence collection) division based in Tel Aviv
- Noam Galin: Brigadier general in the Israel Defense Forces (IDF) military intelligence wing (AMAN); commander of AMAN’s Unit 8200 (SIGINT unit)
- Eli: Mossad Caesarea katsa (intelligence collection operative) on the American station
- Ari: Mossad Caesarea katsa (intelligence collection operative) on the American station
- Mia: Mossad Caesarea katsa (intelligence collection operative) on the American station
- Nahshon: Mossad sniper in Bayonet special forces unit

=== The Iranians ===
- Kasem Kahlidi: Quds lieutenant colonel based in Lebanon; former adjutant to General Qasem Soleimani, former head of Quds Force; CIA codename Atlas
- Siamak Azad: Iranian Ministry of Intelligence and Security (MOIS) major based in Beirut
- Naser Maloof: Iranian MOIS colonel based in Tehran in charge of Iranian counterintelligence
- Kasra Khani: Girlfriend of Kasem Kahlidi
- Ramin “Roger” Gulrajani: Ex-fiance of Kasra Khani working as a doctor in London
- Zana Rahimi: former CIA asset, codename Cerberus
- Walid Zafir: Iranian MOIS officer posing as a Foreign Ministry diplomat in Vienna
- Nabil: Lebanese Hezbollah cell leader

== Critical reception ==
BookTrib reviewed the book: "Dead Drop offers readers a gripping narrative that thrives on suspense and uncertainty." The Big Thrill praised Woodward, who "handles the complex plot with flair, keeping the story moving briskly while still spending the time to draw his characters carefully. This is not an easy skill. Despite the world-saving missions, the protagonists also have emotions and real-world problems—this is what elevates this book above the norm." Jeff Ayers of Criminal Element reviewed the book: "Woodward’s background brings authenticity to the story, making it more than a mere thriller with espionage elements. While the action plays out in a similar style to most novels in this genre, the uniquely compelling characters make Dead Drop exceptional."
