= Kyle Mills (author) =

American novelist (born 1966)

- Born: August 26, 1966 (age 60); Boston, Massachusetts, U.S.
- Occupation: Novelist
- Writing career
- Genre: Political thriller
- Website: kylemills.com

Kyle Mills (born August 26, 1966) is an American writer of thriller fiction.

== Works ==
Mills' novels include Rising Phoenix, Fade, and The Second Horseman. Several of his books (Rising Phoenix, Storming Heaven, Sphere of Influence, Free Fall and Darkness Falls) include a character Mark Beamon, an FBI special agent. He also wrote The Ares Decision (2011), The Utopia Experiment (2013), and The Patriot Attack (2015), the eighth, tenth, and twelfth installments of the Covert-One series, originally created by Robert Ludlum.

He is the former writer of the Mitch Rapp series of novels, having written nine books in the series after original author Vince Flynn died in 2013. In February, 2023, Mills announced he would be leaving the Mitch Rapp series after his contribution to the series, Code Red (2023), was published. Author Don Bentley was announced as the new author for the series.

== Personal life ==
Mills lives in Jackson Hole, Wyoming with his wife and they are both avid rock climbers. Mills grew up in Oregon, and his father was an agent with the FBI.

== Novels by Kyle Mills ==
=== Stand-alone books ===
- Burn Factor (2001, HarperCollins; ISBN 0-06-019334-4)
- Smoke Screen (2003, Putnam; ISBN 0-399-15098-6)
- The Second Horseman (2006, St. Martin's Press; ISBN 0-312-33575-X)
- Lords of Corruption (2009, Vanguard Press; ISBN 1-59315-499-2)
- The Immortalists (2011, Thomas & Mercer; ISBN 1-61218-216-X)

=== Mark Beamon series ===
- Rising Phoenix (1997, HarperCollins; ISBN 0-06-017574-5)
- Storming Heaven (1998, HarperCollins; ISBN 0-06-101250-5)
- Free Fall (2000, HarperCollins; ISBN 0-06-019333-6)
- Sphere of Influence (2002, Putnam; ISBN 0-399-14934-1)
- Darkness Falls (2007, Vanguard Press; ISBN 1-59315-459-3)

=== Fade series ===
- Fade (2005, St. Martin's Press; ISBN 0-312-33577-6)
- Fade In (2025, Authors Equity; ISBN 9798893310399)

=== Robert Ludlum's Covert-One series ===
- The Ares Decision (2011, Grand Central Publishing; ISBN 0-446-69908-X)
- The Utopia Experiment (2013, Grand Central Publishing, ISBN 978-0446539890)
- The Patriot Attack (2015, Grand Central Publishing, ISBN 978-1455577620)

=== Vince Flynn's Mitch Rapp series ===
- The Survivor (2015, Atria/Emily Bestler, ISBN 978-1476783475)
- Order to Kill (2016, Atria/Emily Bestler, ISBN 978-1-4767-8348-2)
- Enemy of the State (2017, Atria/Emily Bestler Books, ISBN 978-1-4767-8351-2)
- Red War (2018, Atria/Emily Bestler Books, ISBN 978-1-5011-9059-9)
- Lethal Agent (2019, Atria/Emily Bestler Books, ISBN 978-1-5011-9062-9)
- Total Power (2020, Atria/Emily Bestler Books, ISBN 978-1-5011-9065-0)
- Enemy at the Gates (2021, Atria/Emily Bestler Books, ISBN 978-1-982164-88-1)
- Oath of Loyalty (2022, Atria/Emily Bestler Books, ISBN 978-1-982164-91-1)
- Code Red (2023, Atria/Emily Bestler Books, ISBN 978-1982164997)
