= Extreme Measures (novel) =

2008 political thriller novel by Vince Flynn

- Hardcover edition
- Author: Vince Flynn
- Language: English
- Series: Mitch Rapp
- Release number: 11
- Genre: Political thriller
- Publisher: Atria Books
- Publication date: October 28, 2008
- Publication place: United States
- Media type: Print (hardcover, paperback), audio, eBook
- Pages: 416
- ISBN: 0-7432-7042-8
- Preceded by: Protect and Defend
- Followed by: Pursuit of Honor

Extreme Measures is a thriller novel by Vince Flynn. The novel was a New York Times best seller. The book is the eleventh in a series featuring counter-terrorism agent Mitch Rapp. In this story, Rapp works with CIA agent Mike Nash to battle a Taliban jihadist.
