= Terminal Velocity (Woodward novel) =

2025 novel by M. P. Woodward

- Author: M. P. Woodward
- Audio read by: Scott Brick
- Language: English
- Series: Jack Ryan Jr.
- Release number: 14
- Genre: Techno-thriller; Military fiction; Realistic fiction
- Publisher: G.P. Putnam's Sons
- Publication date: September 2, 2025
- Publication place: United States
- Media type: Print (hardcover), Audio, eBook
- Pages: 448
- ISBN: 9780593718032
- Preceded by: Line of Demarcation
- Followed by: Pressure Depth

Terminal Velocity (stylized as Tom Clancy Terminal Velocity or Tom Clancy: Terminal Velocity) is a techno-thriller novel, written by M. P. Woodward and published on September 2, 2025. It is his third and final book in the Jack Ryan Jr. series, which is part of the Ryanverse featuring characters created by Tom Clancy. Terminal Velocity is the second of two books by Woodward featuring Jack Junior to be published in the same year, the other being Line of Demarcation.

In the novel, Jack and the Campus must stop a terrorist connected to their past. It debuted at number nine on the New York Times bestseller list.

== Plot summary ==
A series of murders in the United States targets personnel involved with POSEIDON SPEAR, an operation to take down members of the terrorist organization Umayyad Revolutionary Council (URC), after its leader Saif Rahman Yasin (known as "the Emir") was captured by the Campus twenty years ago. (Note: As depicted in Dead or Alive) His son Rafa leads a new separatist cell, Umayyad Caliphate, based on the Pakistani side of Kashmir.

Director of national intelligence Mary Pat Foley and attorney general Dan Murray inform Campus director of operations John Clark about the killings. Clark tasks operative Amanda "Mandy" Cobb and director of information technology Gavin Biery with investigating the murders as FBI special agents, while he plans a secret mission to capture and kill Rafa.

Meanwhile, Jack Ryan Jr. arrives in Delhi, India with his fiancée Lisanne Robertson, where they survive an assassination attempt from a suicide bomber. Arriving in Amritsar for the wedding of Lisanne's friend and doctor Srini Rai, Jack meets her father, Assurance Global Industries (AGI) CEO Daval Rai, as well as AGI's chief operating officer Fahim Bajwa, Rafa's half brother. Later debriefing with Clark about the attempt on his life, the latter asks him to accompany Campus operative Bartosz “Midas” Jankowski to the Pakistani border, evading another assassination attempt from Albanian mercenaries sent by Fahim.

Arriving in Kashmir, Midas is accompanied by Tajik mujahideen fighter Rustam Rajabov as he locates Rafa and the Umayyad fighters. However, Rafa's contact in Pakistani intelligence (ISI), brigadier general Imran Khan, warns him off; Rafa's men get into a gunfight with Midas, injuring him. Rustam informs Jack, who leaves Lisanne on a train bound for the opening of AGI's new bridge at the Karakoram mountain range. He links up with Rustam and Midas and locates a suspected Umayyad camp. Meanwhile, Lisanne relays intelligence to Clark on the train's passengers, including Khan, who is revealed as the mole providing information on the POSEIDON SPEAR operatives to Rafa and Fahim.

In Washington State, Cobb and Biery investigate the murder of a POSEIDON SPEAR operative and his family, leading them to the Hanford nuclear site with sheriff Mitch Whitcomb. Unbeknownst to them, Rafa had ordered the destruction of the site and the subsequent poisoning of the nearby Columbia River, similar to an attempt by his father to destroy the Yucca Mountain nuclear waste repository and citing the At-Takwir. Cobb, Biery, and Whitcomb get into a gunfight with the Albanians and Umayyad fighters, who are later eliminated by the Hanford site's quick response team.

Meanwhile, Campus operative Kendrick Moore, Green Beret snipers Cary Marks and Jad Mustafa, and Marine Raider Tom Buck perform a HALO jump to Jack and Midas's location in Kashmir using an experimental aerial vehicle named RAVEN. (Note: Refers to the AQ-1 Rigid Air Vehicle Entry Nacelle) They raid the Umayyad camp but fail to find Rafa there; nevertheless, they find intel about the planned attacks at Hanford and Karakoram. Jack reunites with Lisanne and returns to the train, which is later ambushed by Rafa and his men, who take them hostage along with the Rai family, Fahim, Khan, and other foreign dignitaries. Jack kills Rafa and exposes Khan as the mastermind, leading to the ISI general killing Fahim before he is shot dead.

Moore, Mustafa, and Buck are awarded the Bronze Star by U.S. president Jack Ryan for apprehending Khan. Lisanne calls off her engagement with Jack.

== Characters ==
=== United States government ===
- Jack Ryan Sr.: President of the United States
- Mary Pat Foley: Director of national intelligence
- Dan Murray: United States attorney general

=== American operators ===
- John Clark: Director of operations for The Campus (black side) and chief security officer for Hendley Associates, a private equity firm (white side)
- Domingo "Ding" Chavez: Former CIA officer; Campus operator
- Jack Ryan Jr.: Lead Campus operator; Hendley venture capitalist
- Kendrick Moore: Former SEAL, Campus operator
- Amanda "Mandy" Cobb: Former FBI special agent, Campus operator
- Lisanne Robertson: Logistics and intelligence director (black side) for the Campus; Hendley project manager
- Gavin Biery: Hendley information technology director, Campus cybersecurity director
- Cary Marks: active-duty Green Beret, Campus operator
- Jad Mustafa: active-duty Green Beret, Campus operator
- Tom Buck: active-duty Marine Raider, Campus operator
- Mitch Whitcomb: sheriff, Asotin County, eastern Washington State
- Irv Dupree: active-duty senior master sergeant, U.S. Air Force, C-17 loadmaster
- Theodore "T-Bolt" Bolton: Department of Energy security team leader

=== The Indians and Pakistanis ===
- Rafa bin Yasin: son of Saif Rahman Yasin ("the Emir"), a terrorist who died in U.S. captivity
- Fahim Bajwa: Rafa's half brother and chief operating officer of Assurance Global Industries, a major global construction company
- Imran Khan: brigadier general, Pakistani Inter-Services Intelligence (ISI) directorate
- Rustam Rajabov: Tajik mujahideen fighter
- Daval Rai: CEO, Assurance Global Industries, Srini Rai's father
- Srini Rai: professor of orthopedics at the University of Texas Dell Medical School
- Sanjay Bodas: husband of Srini Rai, AGI's chief business development officer
- Dren Shala: security specialist for AGI
- Agon Ivanaj: security specialist for AGI

== Reception ==
=== Commercial ===
The book debuted at number eleven at the Combined Print and E-Book Fiction category of the New York Times bestseller list for the week of September 21, 2025, as well as number eleven on the Hardcover Fiction category of the same list.

=== Critical ===
Kirkus Reviews reviewed the book: "A fun read. Terrorists make great Clancy fodder." In one of two reviews from Best Thriller Books, Steve Thomas praised the book as "a superb addition to the Tom Clancy series and is a masterclass in action and suspense".
