= American Assassin =

2017 film by Michael Cuesta

- Theatrical release poster
- Directed by: Michael Cuesta
- Screenplay by: Stephen Schiff; Michael Finch; Edward Zwick; Marshall Herskovitz
- Based on: American Assassin by Vince Flynn
- Produced by: Lorenzo di Bonaventura; Nick Wechsler
- Starring: Dylan O'Brien; Michael Keaton; Sanaa Lathan; Shiva Negar; David Suchet; Navid Negahban; Scott Adkins; Taylor Kitsch
- Cinematography: Enrique Chediak
- Edited by: Conrad Buff IV
- Music by: Steven Price
- Production companies: CBS Films; di Bonaventura Pictures
- Distributed by: Lionsgate Films
- Release date: September 15, 2017
- Running time: 111 minutes
- Country: United States
- Language: English
- Budget: $33 million
- Box office: $67.2 million

American Assassin is a 2017 American action thriller film directed by Michael Cuesta and starring Dylan O'Brien, Michael Keaton, Sanaa Lathan, Shiva Negar, and Taylor Kitsch. Written by Stephen Schiff, Michael Finch, Edward Zwick, and Marshall Herskovitz, the film was based on Vince Flynn's 2010 novel of the same name. The story is centered on young CIA black ops recruit Mitch Rapp, who helps a Cold War veteran try to stop the detonation of a rogue nuclear weapon.

American Assassin was released in the United States on September 15, 2017, and grossed over $67 million worldwide. It received mixed reviews from critics, who described the plot as clichéd and lacking thrills.

== Plot ==
Mitch Rapp and his girlfriend Katrina Harper are on vacation in Ibiza, Spain. Moments after Katrina accepts Mitch's proposal of marriage, a jihadist cell lands on the beach and begins to attack the civilians with rifles. Amid the carnage, Rapp frantically attempts to find Katrina, but his fiancée is killed by the terrorists; Rapp is wounded but survives.

Eighteen months later, Rapp, now consumed by his rage and desire for vengeance, trains himself intensively in martial arts and marksmanship, and he frequents an internet message board where the terrorist responsible for his fiancée's murder quizzes Rapp on aspects of Islam and jihad. Having secured an invitation to meet him face to face in Libya, Rapp prepares to take his vengeance on the man responsible for his fiancée's death, but before he can kill the terrorist, the cell is suddenly ambushed by U.S. Special Forces, and the terrorist he was after is killed in the ambush. Rapp is then dragged away by the U.S. forces. In a CIA facility, Rapp undergoes 30 days of debriefing before being offered a chance by CIA Deputy Director Irene Kennedy to join a black operations unit code-named Orion, led by Stan Hurley, a former Navy SEAL and a Cold War veteran who trains Rapp and the other potential recruits.

Meanwhile, intelligence reveals that weapons grade nuclear material has disappeared from a decommissioned Russian nuclear facility. The material in question appears to be heading to Iranian hardliners, who are upset with the Iranian government's nuclear deal with the U.S. While verifying the sale of the nuclear material in Poland the plutonium is intercepted by a third party, who eliminates the sellers before vanishing into the crowd. In Virginia, Hurley sees news reports and tentatively identifies the perpetrator as a former Orion operative believed to have been killed in action and now going by the codename "Ghost". Hurley's team is sent into Turkey to intercept the buyer Ghost is working for.

In Istanbul, Hurley's team is identified and fails to intercept the trigger device. Rapp pursues the seller to his apartment, and after killing the man, retrieves his laptop. The information leads the team to Rome, where Orion operatives identify a nuclear physicist needed to craft the nuclear material into a functional nuclear weapon. Rapp uncovers a co-worker, Annika, as a foreign agent for Iran. She explains that she is working for the mainstream Iranian faction which is attempting to stop the hardliners from acquiring nuclear material. During a meeting between Hurley and an Iranian contact, Ghost ambushes them, kills the contact, and captures Hurley.

At the CIA safe house, Annika is being moved under guard by two Mossad agents when Rapp intercepts the car and frees her. Working together, they locate the subterranean headquarters Ghost is using to build the nuclear device. After infiltrating the tunnels, Rapp locates and frees Hurley. Annika is captured by Ghost and used as a hostage, so she kills herself to give Rapp a chance to kill Ghost. However, Ghost escapes onto a boat with the nuke. Hurley deduces that Ghost intends to make a kamikaze attack against the U.S. Navy's Sixth Fleet. Rapp chases after Ghost's boat, while the Sixth Fleet, alerted to the impending nuclear attack through CIA channels, prepares for the attack.

Aboard Ghost's boat, Rapp kills Ghost and attempts to divert the boat away from the Sixth Fleet to shield the ships from the blast, before throwing the nuclear weapon into the sea and escaping aboard a Navy rescue helicopter sent by Irene to rescue Hurley. Seconds later the device detonates, creating a massive sinkhole and subsequent tsunami that inundates the Sixth Fleet vessels, but the fleet survives the blast.

In the aftermath of the blast, Hurley is recovering from his injuries and notes that Rapp is on vacation in Dubai, while watching news reports indicating that the Iranian faction that tried to obtain the nuclear weapon will win the presidential election and is blaming the nuclear attack on the CIA. In Dubai, the faction candidate and his escorts enter an elevator in which Rapp is already present.

== Cast ==
- Dylan O'Brien as CIA Agent Mitch Rapp
- Michael Keaton as CIA Agent Stan Hurley, an ex-United States Navy SEAL
- Sanaa Lathan as CIA Deputy Director Irene Kennedy
- Shiva Negar as VAJA Agent Annika
- David Suchet as CIA Director Stansfield
- Navid Negahban as Minister Behruz
- Scott Adkins as Victor
- Taylor Kitsch as Ronnie "Ghost", an operative of Orion, a CIA black operations unit and an ex-United States Navy SEAL
- Alaa Safi as Javeed
- Khalid Laith as Sharif
- Mohammad Bakri as Ashani
- Charlotte Vega as Katrina Harper
- Joseph Long as General Rostani

== Production ==
=== Pre-production ===
CBS Films acquired the rights to Flynn's book series in 2008. The New York Times bestseller Consent to Kill was intended to be the first film in a proposed series. Consent to Kill was scheduled to be produced by Lorenzo di Bonaventura and Nick Wechsler; the screenplay was written by Jonathan Lemkin. The studio's last few films had performed poorly, causing them to delay the film's production. Antoine Fuqua was originally attached to direct, with names being rumored to play Mitch Rapp including Gerard Butler, Colin Farrell and Matthew Fox. However, being a prequel novel, American Assassin provided the opportunity to start at the very beginning of the character Rapp's career instead.

Jeffrey Nachmanoff replaced Ed Zwick as director on February 12, 2012. At the time, Zwick was also writing the script with Marshall Herskovitz, but another draft was written by Mike Finch in October 2012. A further director and screenwriter change took place with Michael Cuesta and Stephen Schiff, respectively, on board as of March 2016.

Production needed to start by April 30, 2016, or the rights to the film would have reverted to the Vince Flynn Estate.

=== Casting ===
On October 10, 2012, Chris Hemsworth was believed to have been offered $10 million to play the lead, Mitch Rapp. However, a month later, it was revealed Hemsworth had turned down the role due to scheduling issues. On May 10, 2016, after being "courted for months", Dylan O'Brien was cast in the lead role with the "idea that O'Brien's Mitch Rapp is college aged, and the hope is the actor grows as the series progresses."

Bruce Willis was in talks to star as Stan Hurley in September 2012, but Michael Keaton was cast as Rapp's mentor on March 9, 2016. Taylor Kitsch joined the cast on August 18, 2016, as the "villainous operative."

On September 7, 2016, Shiva Negar and Sanaa Lathan joined the cast, Negar in a key role as an agent who teams up with Rapp and Hurley, and Lathan as CIA Deputy Director Irene Kennedy, who is to the Flynn novels what M is to James Bond. In the books, Kennedy is white, but "Lathan shone above a large number of actresses who tested for the job as an actress who could grow in the role as her character rises from running strike teams to the heights of power."

=== Filming ===
Principal photography took place between September and December 2016 in London, Rome and Phuket, with additional filming in Valletta Barry (Wales) and Birmingham.

== Release ==
American Assassin was released theatrically in the United States by Lionsgate Films on September 15, 2017.

=== Home media ===
American Assassin was released on Digital HD on November 21, 2017, and on Ultra HD Blu-ray, Blu-ray and DVD on December 5, 2017, by Lionsgate Home Entertainment.

=== Marketing ===
A first picture of O'Brien as Rapp was released on September 12, 2016. On November 2, 2016, production stills of the cast were published.

A first trailer was shown to exhibitors at the Lionsgate panel in CinemaCon in March 2017. The first poster and teaser trailer were released online in April 2017. On June 20, the red band trailer was released.

== Reception ==
=== Box office ===
American Assassin grossed $36.2 million in the United States and Canada, and $30.9 million in other territories, for a worldwide total of $67.2 million, against a production budget of $33 million.

In North America, the film was released alongside Mother!, and was projected to gross $12–14 million from 3,154 theaters in its opening weekend. It made $915,000 from Thursday night previews at 2,400 theaters and $5.8 million on its opening day. It went on to debut to $14.8 million, finishing second at the box office, behind holdover It. In its second weekend, the film made $6.3 million, dropping to 4th.

=== Critical response ===
On the review aggregator website Rotten Tomatoes, 34% of 180 critics' reviews are positive, with an average rating of 4.8/10. The website's consensus reads: "American Assassin hits a few easy targets, but without enough style or wit to truly bring its characters to life—or stand out in a crowded field of more compelling spy thrillers." Metacritic, which uses a weighted average, assigned the film a score of 45 out of 100, based on 30 critics, indicating "mixed or average" reviews. Audiences polled by CinemaScore gave the film an average grade of "B+" on an A+ to F scale, while comScore reported filmgoers gave it a 67% overall positive and a 43% "definite recommend".

Matt Zoller Seitz of RogerEbert.com gave the film two-and-a-half out of four stars, mainly criticizing the film's confused disposition towards revenge: "[American Assassin] keeps telling you that revenge poisons the soul and is generally a bad idea while serving up awesome scenes of Mitch and colleagues killing terrorists.... It doesn't take long to figure out where the film's heart lies, and it would've been more honest if it had embraced that impulse from the start." In addition, other negative reviews came from those such as Ed Potton of The Times, who said "It's just about conceivable that somebody who has never seen a spy thriller might find some enjoyment in American Assassin", and Soren Anderson of the Seattle Times, who wrote, "O'Brien is grimly focused as Rapp, but there isn't a lot of electricity in his performance. He gets the job done, but he's no Matt Damon or Daniel Craig. Their spy-guy shoes remain unfilled."

Kenneth Turan of the Los Angeles Times wrote "American Assassin is a serviceable, workman-like thriller that makes the familiar as involving as it's going to get. It demonstrates that even Jason Bourne lite is better than no Bourne at all, if you're in the mood." Peter Travers of Rolling Stone commended the film, saying "Gorgeously shot by Enrique Chediak, American Assassin may be too slick for its own good, but O'Brien cuts deep enough to make you root for a Rapp franchise." Seitz especially praised Michael Keaton's performance as a Cold War veteran, stating that he was the only actor to have built "an emotionally cohesive, memorable character" despite "material that too often mistakes exposition for psychology." Jamie Righetti of Indiewire concluded that while the film presents a "predictable" script and the "bare minimum of fast action and ass-kicking mandated by [its] formula," paired with "O'Brien's charm and an unquestionably tantalizing ending, it's possible that audiences haven't seen the last of Mitch Rapp."

=== Accolades ===
Year	Award	Category	Nominee	Result	Ref.
2018	Taurus World Stunt Awards	Best fight	American Assassin	Nominated	

== See also ==
- The Amateur (1981 film)
- The Amateur (2025 film)
