= Pursuit of Honor (novel) =

2009 political thriller novel by Vince Flynn

Pursuit Of Honor
- Pursuit of Honor first edition cover
- Author: Vince Flynn
- Cover artist: Richard Yoo
- Language: English
- Series: Mitch Rapp
- Genre: Political thriller
- Publisher: Atria Books
- Publication date: December 1, 2009
- Publication place: United States
- Media type: Print (hardback & paperback)
- Pages: 431 pp (first edition)
- ISBN: 9781416595175
- Preceded by: Extreme Measures
- Followed by: The Last Man

Pursuit of Honor is a thriller novel by Vince Flynn, and the twelfth novel in the Mitch Rapp series. It was published on December 1, 2009.

== Synopsis ==
The book opens days after Muslim extremists have blown up a power lunch restaurant filled with members of Congress and staffers. Afterwards, a second squad attacks the National Counter Terrorist Center, killing dozens more. With nearly 200 dead, the nation does not wish to negotiate with the Islamic extremists. The President has given Rapp a green light to be the judge, jury and executioner. The story takes place over the following week.

Rapp is on the trail of a liberal lawyer inspector general of the CIA who has been giving out information that some consider to aid the enemy. Meanwhile, three of the extremists that helped carry out the DC attack are hiding out in rural Iowa, waiting for the heat to die down. Hakim is the mastermind who knows about the US after living there for a long time, while Karim is a hotheaded soldier who desires a legacy as "The Lion of Al-Qaeda." One day, a dad and son walk up to their farmhouse asking for permission to hunt nearby. Hakim gives them permission because he knows that is all they want, but Karim is convinced they are undercover police and kills them both. Now on the run, they try to stay a step ahead of the police. Neither one trusts the other, and they ended up splitting. Hakim travels to Nassau in order to get money and hide, while Karim and Ahmed travel to Washington to create more chaos.

After the President awards a medal to Nash (set up by Mitch for Nash to give Nash a better life), Karim kidnaps Nash's daughter while he and his wife are having dinner in a restaurant. Karim and Ahmed bring Nash's daughter to the Lincoln Memorial and decide to make a deal with Nash. At the exchange point, Mitch successfully kills Karim.
