= The Third Option =

2000 political thriller novel by Vince Flynn

- Hardcover edition
- Author: Vince Flynn
- Language: English
- Genre: Political thriller
- Publisher: Pocket Books
- Publication date: October 31, 2000
- Publication place: United States
- Media type: Print (Hardcover & Paperback)
- Pages: 358 pp (hardcover); 432 pp (paperback)
- Preceded by: Transfer of Power
- Followed by: Separation of Power

The Third Option is a thriller novel by Vince Flynn, and the fourth to feature Mitch Rapp, an American agent who works for the CIA as an operative for a covert counterterrorism unit called the "Orion Team". The first book in the Mitch Rapp series, American Assassin, was written later, but is a prologue to Kill Shot, the second in this series. The title refers to the option in international relations when diplomacy fails and military intervention is inappropriate: black ops.

== Plot summary ==
Mitch Rapp is sent on a highly sensitive mission in northern Germany to assassinate Count Heinrich Hagenmiller V, a powerful arms dealer who has been selling weapons to Saddam Hussein and other enemies of the United States. Rapp successfully slays Hagenmiller, only to be betrayed by his mission companions "Jane and Tom Hoffman", who attempt to kill Rapp by shooting him twice in the chest, not knowing his jacket was lined with kevlar which absorbed the rounds and knocked him down. Jane (the one that shot him) quickly stages the scene to implicate Rapp and then flees the location with Tom. A shocked Rapp eventually awakes. As a result of his fall, a gash in his head has left a small pool of his blood on the floor. Not wanting to leave the forensic evidence behind, he sets the room on fire and quickly escapes.

Back in Washington, D.C., the situation in Germany quickly becomes known to politicians and officials, with a few trying to use the situation to their own advantage. Democratic Congressman Albert Rudin is not fooled by the CIA's denial of involvement, and argues that it is further proof that the CIA is bad for America and the world, and should be shut down. Henry "Hank" Clark, who is a corrupt, ambitious, and calculating Republican U.S. senator with his eye on the Presidency, is the one that ordered the hit on Rapp, hoping that his dead body would embarrass President Robert Xavier Hayes, and ruin the career of CTC Director, Dr. Irene Kennedy. Clark, along with Rudin and Secretary of State Charles Middleton, are in an alliance to stop Dr. Kennedy from succeeding the dying Thomas Stansfield as Director. Unbeknownst to Rudin and Middleton, Clark dispatches a group of contract killers led by "Professor" Peter Cameron, to initiate a widespread blood-purge that will eliminate any person that can leave a paper trail back to him.

Rapp hides in France and gathers his thoughts. He believes it is possible that his boss, Dr. Irene Kennedy, the Director of the Counter Terrorism Center and "friend", ordered the Hoffmans to assassinate him in order to cover the situation up. Rapp eventually returns to Washington and confronts her and her boss, the CIA Director, Thomas Stansfield at his house. Also found in the room was retired SEAL Team Six Commander, Scott Coleman. With gun drawn, Rapp demands answers; after a brief discourse between him and his bosses, Rapp comes to realize that they had nothing to do with the attempt on his life.

Rapp learns that many of his colleagues are being killed and that his girlfriend Anna Rielly has been kidnapped by the assassins. They kidnapped her in order to set a death trap for Rapp. The Hoffmans, (AKA The Jansens) are assassinated outside their home by Cameron. Rapp, along with Coleman and a few other agents, eventually rescue Anna, killing all of Cameron's men in the process. Cameron, who was talking to one of his men on the phone while the assault was executed, quickly learns that all has failed. Rapp contacts Cameron and pledges to kill him unless he confesses the identity of his employer. Cameron refuses to answer and quickly makes plans to leave the country. However, only moments before Rapp reaches Cameron, he is killed by an Italian assassin named Donatella Rahn, who was hired by Clark.

The president soon learns about the coup d'état against him, and summons two of the main movers of the conspiracy, Rudin and Middleton. The president lambastes them in two separate meetings for betraying their party. He then demands them to tell him everything they know, so he may find out who ordered the hit on Rapp. Both of the men do not give the president any useful answers. Rudin is left without power within the Democratic Congressional caucus and Middleton is told he will be fired as Secretary of State. Shortly afterward Middleton is found dead in his apartment, ruled a suicide. It was Clark that ordered the hit, but pretends to know nothing about it, even to his close friend Jonathan Brown, the Deputy Director of the CIA who hates both Stansfield and Dr. Kennedy. Clark announces to a shocked Brown that he is backing Dr. Kennedy's nomination, but assures him that Kennedy "will never make it through the confirmation process".
