= The Survivor (Mills novel) =

2015 novel by Kyle Mills

- Author: Kyle Mills
- Language: English
- Series: Mitch Rapp
- Genre: Political thriller
- Publisher: Atria/Emily Bestler Books
- Publication date: October 6, 2015
- Publication place: United States
- Media type: Print (hardback)
- Pages: 400 pp
- ISBN: 978-1476783451
- Preceded by: The Last Man

The Survivor is the fourteenth novel in the Mitch Rapp series. It was published on October 6, 2015. It is the first novel in the series to be written by Kyle Mills, after the death of previous series author, Vince Flynn.

== Synopsis ==
Top secret data has been stolen from the CIA, and the only man who knows its hiding place is dead. CIA operative Mitch Rapp must race to find the classified information in this novel that acts as a continuation of the previous novel, The Last Man

Former CIA agent Joseph “Rick” Rickman has stolen secret data concerning classified operations all over the world, offering it (and himself) to the Pakistani secret forces. CIA director Irene Kennedy sends Mitch Rapp to kill Rickman but the aftermath poses more problems.
