= Line of Demarcation (novel) =

2025 novel by M. P. Woodward

- Author: M. P. Woodward
- Audio read by: Scott Brick
- Language: English
- Series: Jack Ryan Jr.
- Release number: 13
- Genre: Techno-thriller; Military fiction; Realistic fiction
- Publisher: G.P. Putnam's Sons
- Publication date: May 20, 2025
- Publication place: United States
- Media type: Print (hardcover), Audio, eBook
- Pages: 400
- ISBN: 9780593718001
- Preceded by: Shadow State
- Followed by: Terminal Velocity

Line of Demarcation (stylized as Tom Clancy Line of Demarcation or Tom Clancy: Line of Demarcation) is a techno-thriller novel, written by M. P. Woodward and released on May 20, 2025. It is his second book in the Jack Ryan Jr. series, which is part of the Ryanverse featuring characters created by Tom Clancy. Line of Demarcation is the first of two books by Woodward featuring Jack Junior to be published in the same year, the other being Terminal Velocity.

In the novel, Jack and the Campus must stop a conspiracy between Venezuelan narcoterrorists and Russian mercenaries to seize Guyana's recently discovered oil fields. It debuted at number eleven on the New York Times bestseller list.

== Plot summary ==
At the Orinoco Basin, the United States Coast Guard tender Harry Claiborne installs navigation buoys for safe passage of ships to Guyana's new oil and gas platforms when they are attacked by mercenaries working for Venezuela-based Colombian drug lord Juan "Tiburon" Machado. The mercenaries, known as Tiburonistas, kill the surviving crew.

The next morning, Jack Ryan Jr. tries to secure an oil export license for a shipping company at Georgetown, Guyana on a "white-side" assignment for Hendley Associates. Meeting with interior minister Dr. Alberto Quintero, they find out that the request for the export license was rejected by prime minister Augustus "Guto" Castillo, who had opposed the privatization plan for the country's newly discovered oil fields. An associate of Tiburon, Castillo finds out about the Claiborne attack and tasks Guyanese intelligence chief Alejandro Romero with informing director of national intelligence Mary Pat Foley that the drug lord alone ordered the attack.

Later that night, Jack meets with Dr. Quintero, who introduces him to acting attorney general Hugo Suarez, who had been investigating Tiburon's connections with senior government officials. The two are killed by assassins sent by the drug lord as Jack barely escapes. Meanwhile, Campus operative Domingo "Ding" Chavez, working undercover for Tiburon as a Colombian intelligence advisor, discovers the drug lord working with Russian Wagner Group mercenaries through Russian foreign intelligence (SVR) major Igor Morozov. He sends a distress signal to Campus director of operations John Clark, who leads a team to extract him from Tiburon's base at the Orinoco Delta in Venezuela. Chavez is later caught trying to escape and is interrogated by Morozov, who learns about his identity and his involvement in a surgical airstrike on a cartel meeting that killed Tiburon's parents in the 1980s. (Note: As depicted in Clear and Present Danger)

Jack arrives at Dr. Quintero's residence to find his wife, daughter, and nephew in the aftermath of a Tiburonista attack. They find videotapes with evidence of Tiburon's corruption and briefly evade the Tiburonistas before they are captured by Guyanese police officers. Meanwhile, Castillo declares martial law, citing Tiburonistas causing unrest in the country, and orders Jack and Dr. Quintero's family killed in order to minimize American involvement in Guyana. However, Jack breaks free and rescues Dr. Quintero's family from a cocaine factory owned by Tiburon outside Georgetown. He contacts his fiancée Lisanne Robertson, whom he reunites with the Campus team.

Regrouping at the Marlin oil platform, Jack and Clark lead their own teams as they infiltrate Tiburon's base in Venezuela but arrive too late as his private yacht Gran Blanco had already left. Clark and operative Kendrick Moore pursue the yacht and locate Chavez; they are later joined by Jack, operatives Amanda "Mandy" Cobb and Steven "Chilly" Edwards, and Green Beret sniper Jad Mustafa as they kill Tiburon and his men on the yacht.

Meanwhile, Wagner Group mercenaries and Tiburonistas led by Wagner leader Yevgeny Zuka invade the Marlin oil platform, aided by the Russian frigate Admiral Gorshkov nearby. They capture Lisanne and Dr. Quintero's family and set up anti-ship and surface-to-air missile defenses, as Green Beret sniper Cary Marks hides at the top of the platform. Clark steers the Gran Blanco towards the oil platform, while Chavez impersonates Tiburon and orders the Tiburonistas to fire on the Russians. Lisanne and Dr. Quintero's family break free and regroup with the Campus team aboard the Gran Blanco.

In Abu Dhabi, Guyanese president Ali Khasif is rescued by American forces after being stranded in the desert by SVR. He forestalls Castillo's coup attempt by making an announcement on live TV; the prime minister kills Romero, framing him as working with Tiburon. Two months later, Castillo is arrested and extradited to the U.S. Clark and Chavez track down Morozov to Tobago and kill him.

== Characters ==
=== United States government ===
- Mary Pat Foley: Director of national intelligence
- Sydney O'Keefe: Ambassador to Guyana

=== The Campus (black side) and Hendley Associates (white side) ===
- John Clark: Director of operations; Hendley chief security officer
- Domingo "Ding" Chavez: former CIA officer, operator
- Jack Ryan, Jr.: lead Campus operator, Hendley venture capitalist
- Kendrick Moore: former SEAL, operator
- Amanda "Mandy" Cobb: former FBI, operator
- Lisanne Robertson: former Marine, operator; Hendley logistics director
- Gavin Biery: information technology specialist; Hendley cybersecurity director
- Steven "Chilly" Edwards: former SWAT officer, operator
- Cary Marks: active duty Green Beret, operator
- Jad Mustafa: active duty Green Beret, operator
- Howard Brennan: Hendley chief investment officer

=== The Guyanese ===
- Ali Khasif: president
- Augustus "Guto" Castillo: prime minister
- Dr. Alberto Quintero, aka the Professor: minister of the interior
- Amancia Quintero: Alberto Quintero's wife
- Tallulah Quintero: Alberto Quintero's daughter
- Gustavo Quintero: Alberto Quintero's nephew
- Alejandro Romero: head of the National Intelligence and Security Agency (NISA)
- Hugo Suarez: acting attorney general and lead prosecutor

=== Venezuelans and Russians ===
- Juan Machado aka Tiburon: Colombian drug lord operating in Venezuela
- Igor Morozov: major in Russia's foreign intelligence service (SVR)
- Yevgeny Zuka: Russian Wagner Group combat leader
- Carlos Carza: combat leader of the Tiburonistas, Tiburon's mercenary group
- Viktor Zhdanov: CEO of Russian oil company giant Gazneft
- Mikhail Krokhmal: Captain First Rank of Russian frigate Admiral Gorshkov

== Development ==
Line of Demarcation was inspired by the real-life discovery of oil fields in Guyana, as related by Woodward in a radio interview with KSCJ; he also visited the country for research.

== Reception ==
=== Commercial ===
The book debuted at number eleven at the Combined Print and E-Book Fiction category of the New York Times bestseller list for the week of June 8, 2025.

=== Critical ===
Publishers Weekly praised the book: "Woodward juggles each subplot with aplomb, and ushers the proceedings toward the exact sort of explosive climax Clancy readers expect." Red Carpet Crash reviewed the book: "Another action-filled novel in the series complete with shootouts, betrayals and killer jet skis. Woodward has done Clancy proud with his second novel in this series." In one of two reviews from Best Thriller Books, Kashif Hussain reviewed the book: "The renewed energy does wonders for the whole narrative as you learn new things while getting thoroughly entertained by the fast-paced taut chain of events that engage all your senses."
