= Shiva Negar =

Iranian-Canadian actress

- شیوا نگار
- Born: Iran
- Education: York University (BA, Psychology)
- Alma mater: York University
- Occupations: Actress; producer
- Years active: 2010–present
- Notable work: American Assassin; Becoming Burlesque; SEAL Team

Shiva Negar (Persian: شیوا نگار) is an Iranian-Canadian actress and producer. Her first feature was a supporting role in the film Lost Journey. Other significant acting credits include the 2017 action thriller American Assassin, Becoming Burlesque, The Threat Next Door, and television shows My Babysitter's a Vampire and SEAL Team. Born in Iran, and raised in Turkey and Canada, Shiva started her career as a child performer. She began by performing at piano and guitar recitals and in singing competitions. In high school, Shiva was involved in several school plays and did a lot of theatre, which quickly became her art of choice and decided to take her passion for acting to the next level. Shiva graduated from York University with a degree in Psychology and finished her Post-graduate program in Events Management & Public Relations.

== Filmography ==
=== Film ===
Year	Title	Role	Notes
2010	Monday the Milestone: Wake Me	Secretary	Short film
2010	Lost Journey	Donya - Dream Gril	
2012	Please Kill Mr. Know It All	Patron #4	
2013	Where Love Takes You	Juilette	Short film; also associate producer
2013	Loraine	Alissa	Short film
2013	Little White Lines	Juliette	Short film
2015	Street Meet	Jasmine	Short film
2015	Let's Rap	Sylvia	
2016	Day Players	Trinity Grace	Short film
2017	Becoming Burlesque	Fatima Jackson-Aziz	
2017	American Assassin	Annika Ogden	
2018	The Bounty	Blanca	Short film
2018	The Amaranth	Mia	
2018	Ctrl	Jane Code	Short film
2019	The Cuban	Zahra Karzai	
2019	Merging with the Infinite	Laila Homa	Short film
2022	Social Industrial Meltdown	Laila	Short film
2023	Shadow of the Future	Trina	Short film
2023	The Threat Next Door	Mary	
2023	Burned By Love	Ashley Morrison	
2024	The Last King	Soraya	Short film; Co-Producer
2024	Wingman	Terri	
2025	Deadly Vows	Darya	

=== Television ===
Year	Title	Role	Notes
2011	Combat Hospital	Zarmeeneh	Guest role; 2 episodes
2011	Alphas	Guest #1	Episode: "A Short Time in Paradise"
2011	Covert Affairs	Girlfriend	Episode: "A Girl Like You"
2012	My Babysitter's a Vampire	Lucia	Episode: "Say You'll Be Maztak"
2013	Hemlock Grove	Brunette	Episode: "Jellyfish in the Sky"
2014	24 Hour Rental	Gypsy	Recurring role; 6 episodes
2014	Murdoch Mysteries	Anna Rico	Episode: "High Voltage"
2015	The Art of More	Sanaa Mustafa	Guest role; 2 episodes
2016	Four in the Morning	Coralie	Recurring role; 4 episodes
2016	Downtown Browns	Fati	Episode: "Constellated"
2019	Heartland	Maya	Recurring role; 3 episodes
2019	Blood & Treasure	Jamila Vaziri	Recurring role; upcoming series
2019	Hudson & Rex	Olivia Milner	Episode: "A Man of Consequence"
2020	The Next Step	Tink Kelly	Recurring role; 5 episodes
2020	ALT	Saj	Series Regular
2021	SEAL Team	Mina Hassan	Recurring role; 7 episodes
2022	The Cleaning Lady	Isabel Barsamian	Recurring role; 5 episodes
