= Vince Flynn =

American author (1966–2013)

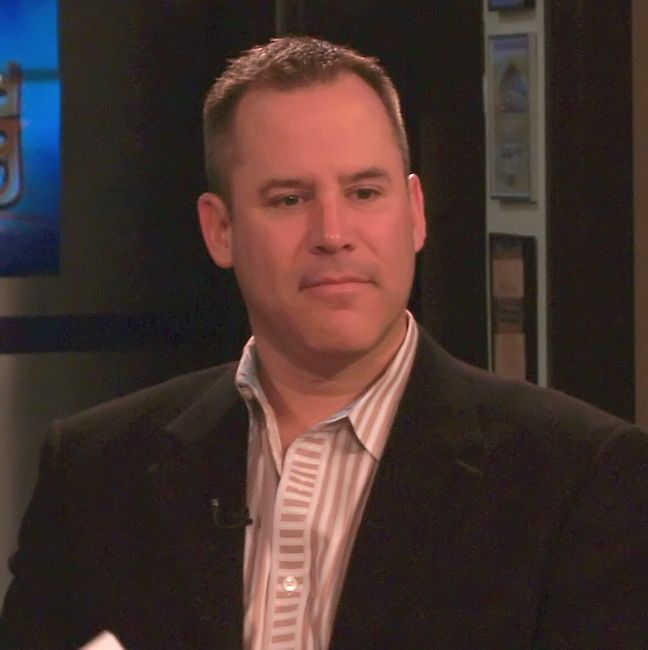
- Flynn in 2008
- Born: Vincent Joseph Flynn; April 6, 1966; Saint Paul, Minnesota, US
- Died: June 19, 2013 (aged 47); Saint Paul, Minnesota, US
- Education: University of St. Thomas (BA)
- Occupations: Writer; novelist; television consultant
- Spouse: Lysa Flynn
- Children: 3
- Writing career
- Language: English
- Period: 1997–2013
- Subjects: Political thriller, techno-thriller, action thriller
- Website: vinceflynn.com

Vincent Joseph Flynn (April 6, 1966 – June 19, 2013) was an American author of political thriller novels featuring the fictional assassin Mitch Rapp. He was a story consultant for the fifth season of the television series 24. He died of prostate cancer on June 19, 2013.

== Biography ==
=== Early life and education ===
Flynn was born on April 6, 1966, one of seven children born to Terry Flynn and Kathleen Flynn, and a graduate of Saint Thomas Academy in 1984, and the University of St. Thomas in 1989, with a Bachelor of Economics.

=== Early career ===
After graduating, Flynn went to work for Kraft Foods as an account and sales marketing specialist. In 1991, he left Kraft to pursue a career as an aviator with the United States Marine Corps. One week before leaving for Officer Candidate School, he was medically disqualified from the Marine Aviation Program.

In an effort to overcome the difficulties of dyslexia, Flynn forced himself into a daily writing and reading routine. His writing influences included Leon Uris, Tom Clancy, Ernest Hemingway, John Irving, Robert Ludlum, J. R. R. Tolkien, and Gore Vidal.

=== Writing and media career ===
Flynn's newfound interest in fiction motivated him to begin work on a novel of his own. While employed as a bartender in the Saint Paul area, he completed his first book, Term Limits, which he self-published. Of the book, Flynn said: "I had just finished reading The Government Racket: Washington Waste from A to Z, by Martin L. Gross. It is without a doubt the most disheartening and enlightening book about politics that I've ever read. I was out jogging one day wondering what it would take to really change Washington, when my thoughts turned to a friend who had been shot and killed in Washington, D.C., several summers earlier. As I continued running, a story started to unfold."

Pocket Books published the hardcover edition of Term Limits in 1998, and a mass market paperback in 1999, which spent several weeks on The New York Times bestseller list. Subsequent works, including Flynn's 1999 novel Transfer of Power, his 2000 novel The Third Option, and his 2001 novel Separation of Power, also appeared on the New York Times bestseller list, with Separation of Power rising as high as No. 7.

Flynn's fifth novel, Executive Power, was published in hardcover by Atria Books in 2003, followed by his sixth novel, Memorial Day in 2004, his seventh, Consent to Kill, in 2005, his eighth, Act of Treason, in 2006, his ninth, Protect and Defend, in 2007, and his tenth, Extreme Measures, in 2008. Except for Term Limits, his books centered on counterterrorism agent Mitch Rapp.

Flynn wrote six New York Times bestsellers for Atria Books, and had a contract for four more. He remembered deciding between following the path that was the most uncomfortable—continuing with what looked to be a promising career as a commercial real estate leasing agent—or taking a big risk and starting a new career as a writer: "I look back on it now and I couldn't be happier with my decision, but at the time I remember a lot of people thought I was nuts."

In February 2008, Flynn agreed on film and book projects with CBS Corporation units CBS Films and Simon & Schuster/Atria Books. Lorenzo di Bonaventura was negotiating to produce Mitch Rapp films. The first film, American Assassin, was released in 2017. Atria Books got worldwide rights to four of Flynn's books. In August 2010, Flynn signed a two-book deal for a new series that he would have co-written with Brian Haig, a retired Army lieutenant colonel. He was a frequent guest on The Glenn Beck Radio Program on the Fox News Channel, and on Dan Barreiro's radio program on Twin Cities station KFAN.

=== Personal life ===
Flynn lived with his wife, Lysa, and their three children in the Twin Cities (Minneapolis-St. Paul) area. He was Catholic.

=== Illness and death ===
On February 1, 2011, in his fan newsletter, Flynn announced that he was being treated for advanced Stage III prostate cancer. He died of a rare form of aggressive prostate cancer in Saint Paul, aged 47, on June 19, 2013.

== Published works ==
=== Novels ===
Mitch Rapp series

Mitch Rapp is a fictional undercover CIA counterterrorism agent. Rapp's primary focus is to thwart terrorist attacks on the U.S., and he is presented as an aggressive operative willing to take measures more extreme than might commonly be considered acceptable. His constant frustration with procedures and red tape is a major theme in the series.

From 2015 to 2023, the Mitch Rapp series was continued by Kyle Mills. Starting in 2024 with Capture or Kill, the Mitch Rapp series has been continued by Don Bentley.

Publication year	Storyline order	Title	ISBN	Author
1999	3	Transfer of Power	ISBN 0-671-02319-5	Vince Flynn
2000	4	The Third Option	ISBN 0-671-04731-0	Vince Flynn
2001	5	Separation of Power	ISBN 0-671-04733-7	Vince Flynn
2003	6	Executive Power	ISBN 0-7434-5395-6	Vince Flynn
2004	7	Memorial Day	ISBN 0-7434-5397-2	Vince Flynn
2005	8	Consent to Kill	ISBN 0-7432-7036-3	Vince Flynn
2006	9	Act of Treason	ISBN 0-7432-7037-1	Vince Flynn
2007	10	Protect and Defend	ISBN 978-0-7432-7041-0	Vince Flynn
2008	11	Extreme Measures	ISBN 0-7432-7042-8	Vince Flynn
2009	12	Pursuit of Honor	ISBN 978-1-4165-9516-8	Vince Flynn
2010	1	American Assassin	ISBN 978-1-4165-9518-2	Vince Flynn
2012	2	Kill Shot	ISBN 978-1-4165-9520-5	Vince Flynn
2013	13	The Last Man	ISBN 978-1-4165-9521-2	Vince Flynn
2015	14	The Survivor	ISBN 978-1-4767-8345-1	Kyle Mills
2016	15	Order to Kill	ISBN 978-1-4767-8348-2	Kyle Mills
2017	16	Enemy of the State	ISBN 978-1-4767-8351-2	Kyle Mills
2018	17	Red War	ISBN 978-1-5011-9059-9	Kyle Mills
2019	18	Lethal Agent	ISBN 978-1-5011-9062-9	Kyle Mills
2020	19	Total Power	ISBN 978-1-5011-9065-0	Kyle Mills
2021	20	Enemy at the Gates	ISBN 978-1-982164-88-1	Kyle Mills
2022	21	Oath of Loyalty	ISBN 978-1-982164-91-1	Kyle Mills
2023	22	Code Red	ISBN 978-1-982164-99-7	Kyle Mills
2024	23	Capture or Kill	ISBN 978-1-668045-83-1	Don Bentley
2025	24	Denied Access	ISBN 978-1-6680-4590-9	Don Bentley
2026	25	Double Tap	ISBN 978-1-6680-4591-6	Don Bentley

Related book

- Term Limits is not part of the Mitch Rapp series, but takes place in the same universe. Scott Coleman from the Mitch Rapp series appears in the book, which takes place after the events of Kill Shot.

== Adaptations ==
In 2017 the novel American Assassin was adapted into a film of the same name (2017), directed by Michael Cuesta.
