= Separation of Power =

2001 political thriller novel by Vince Flynn

- Author: Vince Flynn
- Language: English
- Genre: Political thriller
- Publisher: Pocket Books
- Publication date: October 1, 2001
- Publication place: United States
- Media type: Print (Hardcover & Paperback)
- Pages: 368 pp (hardcover); 448pp (paperback)
- Preceded by: The Third Option
- Followed by: Executive Power

Separation of Power is a thriller novel by Vince Flynn. It is the fifth to feature Mitch Rapp, an American agent who works for the CIA as an operative for a covert counterterrorism unit called the "Orion Team".

== Plot ==
About a month after the events in the previous book, CIA Director Thomas Stansfield has succumbed to cancer and has chosen Dr. Irene Kennedy, The director of the CIA's counterterrorism center, to take his place as director. Meanwhile, Henry "Hank" Clark, a corrupt Republican senator and chairman of the Senate Select Committee on Intelligence, is making plans to prevent Kennedy from becoming the director of the CIA. His plan involves embarrassing her before she can be confirmed for the position, and handpick a new director and have them open up "ECHELON", a global surveillance program, and give its secrets to his investors in Silicon Valley, who will then help him get elected to become president. His original plan to kill Rapp and embarrass the CIA failed, so he begins the process of his new plan.

Mitch Rapp is called in to visit Kennedy to talk about Peter Cameron, the CIA officer who attempted to have him killed in Germany, but was killed by an assassin before Rapp could capture him. He and Kennedy watch surveillance footage that captured the face of the assassin. Rapp realizes that the assassin is Donatella Rahn, an Israeli assassin and Rapp's ex-girlfriend. Kennedy instructs him to take his girlfriend, Anna Rielley, to Milan and propose to her, and then go visit Donatella to learn who hired her to kill Peter Cameron. Meanwhile, Clark visits his accomplice, Mossad director Ben Freidman at the Israeli Embassy, who has been helping him become president in exchange for more aid to Israel. At the meeting, Clark orders Ben to assassinate Donatella, who he hired to kill Peter.

Later that day, Ben visits President Xavier Hayes, Kennedy, and General Flood, the chairmen of the Joint Chiefs of Staff, at the White House. It is there he informs them that Saddam Hussein, with the help of North Korea, is only a few weeks away from acquiring three functioning nuclear weapons. He also informs them that the facility for making these weapons is hidden under a massive hospital in Baghdad, and that if the Americans won't take action, than they will do it themselves. Seeing as how an Israeli response could lead to nuclear war, The President and his team start to come up with ways to destroy the facility and the nukes.

At the same time, Mitch and Anna arrive in Milan, and after a day of touring the city, Rapp goes to visit Donatella. In Washington, Clark persuades his accomplice, Albert Rudin, Chairman of the House Permanent Select Committee on Intelligence, to investigate Kennedy for corruption and promises him evidence before her confirmation ceremony. In Milan, Rapp can't get Donatella to tell him who hired her, but realizes they are being followed. When they arrive at her apartment, Donatella is ambushed by awaiting Mossad operatives, but manages to kill them thanks to Rapp's warning. After Rapp promises her protection in America, Donatella confesses that Ben had hired her to kill Peter. Rapp brings Donatella to his and Anna's hotel room, where she accuses Rapp of having an affair, and she storms off before he can explain.

In Washington, D.C., General Flood concocts a plan to insert a Delta Force team into Baghdad, disguised as a presidential motorcade, and infiltrate the facility under the cover of a U.S bombing campaign across Iraq in order to steal the nukes. But Kennedy strongly recommends Rapp to lead the operation. Elsewhere in Washington, Jonathan Brown, deputy director of the CIA, meets with Norb Steveken, the head of an investigative firm hired by hank and Rudin to investigate Kennedy. Brown hands off classified information on Orion Team, a secret counterterrorism team led by Kennedy, who Rapp is a member of. Rapp returns to America and is read in on the plan to infiltrate Baghdad. He agrees to the mission and comes up with the idea of impersonating Uday Hussein, Saddam's favorite son, in order to gain access to the facility. As they prepare for the mission, Rudin reveals the existence of Mitch Rapp and the Orion Team on meet the press and implicates Kennedy of violating international law, throwing the confirmation process into chaos.

President Hayes orders the bombing campaign against Iraq, which helps Rapp and the Delta team to successfully enters Baghdad. Rapp and the Delta team, disguised as SRG soldiers, are able to enter the facility and steal the nukes. As they fend off enemy fire, they destroy the facility, kidnap the head North Korean scientist, and escape Iraq with the nukes. After they return to the U.S safely, President Hayes reveals the success of the operation and confirms Rapp's existence by explaining Rapp's action in Iraq. Rapp returns to his home and apologizes to Anna, and after he does this, he retires from his role as an assassin and proposes to her. His plan having failed due to the fact Kennedy is looked at as a hero, Clark kills Rudin by pushing him off his balcony, making it look like a suicide.

When the Israeli prime minister comes to Washington with Ben Freidman and Yasser Arafat, Rapp and the president interrogate Ben and threaten to kill him. As a result of this, Ben reveals Clarks role in the week's events. Several weeks after this, Clark is killed by Rapp and Donatella at a bar in D.C, making it look like an apparent heart attack.
