= M. P. Woodward =

American novelist

- Occupation: Writer
- Writing career
- Genres: Thriller, war fiction
- Notable works: The Handler; Tom Clancy: Shadow State
- Website: mpwoodward.com

Michael Patrick Woodward, also known as M. P. Woodward, is an American novelist. He is known for his espionage thriller series The Handler and for continuing the Jack Ryan Jr. series in Tom Clancy's Ryanverse.

== Early life and career ==
Woodward was a naval intelligence officer with the United States Indo-Pacific Command, where he wrote scenarios for military wargame exercises and worked alongside multiple branches of the U.S. military, intelligence agencies, and allied commands. After leaving the military, he held executive roles at Amazon Prime Video.

== Writing career ==
=== The Handler series ===
Woodward made his fiction debut with The Handler (2022), an espionage thriller inspired by his military and intelligence experience. The novel introduced a former CIA operative forced to return to the field under the guidance of his ex-wife. It was followed by Dead Drop (2023).

=== Tom Clancy's Ryanverse ===
Woodward took over the Jack Ryan Jr. series, which is part of Tom Clancy's Ryanverse, from Don Bentley. His first novel in the series, Tom Clancy: Shadow State was released in 2024, followed by Tom Clancy: Line of Demarcation and Tom Clancy: Terminal Velocity, both released in 2025. They have all debuted on the New York Times bestseller list.

Woodward is also slated to take over the Jack Ryan series from Ward Larsen in 2026.

=== Other works ===
In 2025, Woodward released Red Tide, a techno-thriller depicting a near-future conflict between the United States and China over Taiwan, drawing comparisons to Clancy's 1986 novel Red Storm Rising. He also co-wrote the political thriller novel The Fourth Option with Jack Carr, which was released in 2026.

== Bibliography ==
=== The Handler series ===
- The Handler (2022)
- Dead Drop (2023)

=== Ryanverse ===
Featuring characters created by Tom Clancy

==== Jack Ryan Jr. series ====
- Tom Clancy: Shadow State (2024)
- Tom Clancy: Line of Demarcation (2025)
- Tom Clancy: Terminal Velocity (2025)

==== Jack Ryan series ====
- Tom Clancy: The Coldest War (2026)

=== Standalone ===
- Red Tide (2025)
- The Fourth Option (with Jack Carr) (2026)
