= The Handler (novel) =

2022 thriller novel by M. P. Woodward

- First edition cover
- Author: M. P. Woodward
- Audio read by: Jon Lindstrom
- Language: English
- Series: Handler
- Release number: 1
- Genre: Spy thriller
- Publisher: Berkley Books
- Publication date: May 31, 2022
- Publication place: United States
- Media type: Print (Hardcover), Audio, eBook
- Pages: 448
- ISBN: 978-0-593-44163-3
- Followed by: Dead Drop

The Handler is the debut novel by American author M. P. Woodward, published on May 31, 2022 by Berkley Books. It is also the first book in the Handler series. The book follows CIA officer Meredith Morris-Dale as she must work with her disgraced colleague and ex-husband John to extract an Iranian nuclear physicist.

== Plot summary ==
Senior CIA officer Meredith Morris-Dale is called in by her Counterproliferation Division head Ed Rance and director of clandestine services Jeff Dorsey for an operation called Active Archer, which involves Iranian nuclear physicist and CIA asset Zana Rahimi, codenamed Cerberus. Rahimi had provided the agency with backdoor access to Iran’s centrifuge arrays from a uranium enrichment facility in Tabriz, until his daughter Sahar died when her plane was mistakenly shot down by the Iranian Revolutionary Guard Corps (IRGC) in Tehran.

After his daughter’s death, Rahimi shuts down CIA’s access and demands to speak to his former handler John Dale, Meredith's ex-husband. A former Special Activities Division (SAD) officer, John was indefinitely suspended by his employers five years ago after his loyalties came under suspicion following his escape from an Islamic State prison in Mosul, Iraq. Meredith is tasked to bring him back and serve as his handler while he tries to contact Rahimi.

Rance is compromised by Russian foreign intelligence (SVR) operative Maria Borbova (codenamed Zoloto, alias Genevieve Lund), who learns about Meredith’s mission. Another SVR operative Yuri Kuznetsov surveils Meredith after a failed CIA operation in Dubai; after learning about Maria’s investigation, he informs Quds Force lieutenant colonel Kasem Kahlidi in Beirut, Lebanon about a possible mole in the Iranian nuclear program, as Russia prepares to help the country achieve breakout. Meanwhile, Maria follows Meredith as she visits John at his home in Seattle. John initially refuses, but after he is attacked by a two-man Spetsnaz team Maria had left behind, he agrees to contact Rahimi on his own terms.

The SVR issues an Interpol notice on John and Meredith, enabling Maria to track down John to a hotel in Mumbai, India. Rahimi sends his wife Nadia to meet John, instructing him to bring her to the United States before he can turn himself in. John and Nadia drive to the U.S. consulate, evading Maria and her Spetsnaz team. After Nadia settles in the U.S., John goes to Istanbul, Turkey. From there, he takes a train to Iran, escaping after killing an Iranian police officer tailing him.

Kasem sends a Hezbollah operative to verify Kuznetsov’s information about the mole, but he ends up killing him. Fearing a retaliation from the Russians, Kasem looks up John’s legend Reza Shariati and recognizes him as the man who had saved him from the Islamic State prison in Mosul. He narrows down the search for the mole, recalling Rahimi and his supervisor Javad Mirzadeh from the nuclear reactor at Bushehr back to Tabriz. They make a refueling stop at Saqqez, where Rahimi kills Mirzadeh and escapes.

Rahimi contacts Meredith through Nadia, asking to be extracted out of Iran. She tells him to meet John in the town of Alut. Meredith also informs Rance that she is going to Doha, Qatar to supervise the extraction, unknowingly flushing him out as a security leak as she proceeds to Dubai instead, but Maria follows her there. She drugs Meredith with scopolamine and sends the coordinates for John and Rahimi’s rendezvous point to her Spetsnaz colleague Oleg. Meredith later kills her and returns to supervise Rahimi’s extraction, later blackmailing Rance by informing him about Maria into sending her with SEAL Team Six to pick up the scientist and her husband.

John steals a car and drives to Alut. Rahimi arrives there, accompanied by a former Kurd separatist fighter. Waiting nearby, Oleg shoots John and snatches Rahimi just as Kasem arrives and calls IRGC for reinforcements. John survives by wearing a Kevlar vest and kills Oleg when he hunts him down. Meredith arrives with the Navy SEAL team and rescues John and Rahimi. They also capture Kasem, who introduces himself and offers to spy for the United States, clearing John’s name.

== Characters ==
=== The Americans ===
- Meredith Morris-Dale: Senior operations officer in CIA’s Counterproliferation (CPT) Division; ex-wife of John Dale
- John Dale: Indefinitely suspended CIA case officer living in rural Washington State
- Grace Morris-Dale: John and Meredith’s daughter; midshipman at the U.S. Naval Academy
- Ed Rance: Department head of CIA’s CPT Division
- Jeff Dorsey: Director of CIA’s National Clandestine Service
- Rick Desmond: Junior CIA analyst in the CPT Division; Meredith’s deputy
- Steve Chadwick: CIA Istanbul chief of station; Meredith’s occasional boyfriend

=== The Russians ===
- Yuri Kuznetsov: Russian SVR (Foreign Intelligence Service) (Directorate PR) officer based in Damascus
- Maria Borbova: Russian SVR (Directorate S) officer based in London; SVR codename Zoloto; alias Genevieve Lund
- Colonel Vladimir Niskorov: Russian SVR (Directorate PR) commander at SVR HQ Yasenevo District
- Vasily: Russian Spetsnaz operative in SVR’s Aslan (Alpha) elite foreign operations team
- Leo: Russian Spetsnaz operative in SVR’s Aslan (Alpha) elite foreign operations team
- Oleg: Russian Spetsnaz operative in SVR’s Aslan (Alpha) elite foreign operations team
- Putov: Yuri Kuznetsov’s number two SVR officer in Damascus
- Nikita: Russian scientist shadowing Zana Rahimi at the Tabriz enrichment facility

=== The Iranians ===
- Zana Rahimi: Nuclear physicist working in the Iranian centrifuge arrays; CIA codename Cerberus
- Nadia Rahimi: Zana’s wife living in Tehran
- Sahar Rahimi: Zana and Nadia’s daughter; student at McGill University in Montreal
- Kasem Kahlidi: Quds lieutenant colonel based in Lebanon; former adjutant to General Soleimani, former head of Quds Force
- Naser Maloof: Iranian Ministry of Intelligence and Security (MOIS) colonel based in Tehran
- Javad Mirzadeh: Zana’s supervisor at the Tabriz enrichment facility; an active-duty Iranian Revolutionary Guards Corps (IRGC) major
- Kasra: Girlfriend of Kasem Kahlidi living in Tehran
- Major General Qasem Soleimani: Commanding general of Quds Force, killed by an American drone strike in Iraq in January 2020
- Brigadier General Hossein Salami: Commanding general of IRGC

== Development ==
Woodward got the idea for The Handler through the real-life shootdown of Ukraine International Airlines Flight 752 by the Iranian Revolutionary Guard Corps in January 2020, which he depicted in the book's opening scene. He explained in an interview with The Big Thrill: "As a father with kids in college myself, I couldn’t help but think about how the families of those Iranians must have felt. Then, when I thought about the potentialities of their place in the larger conflict between the US and Iran, the story blossomed for me.”

Woodward began writing the novel in January 2020 while working for Amazon, finishing later in July. He signed with the agent Scott Miller at Trident Media in 2021 and sent the manuscript to Tom Clancy's longtime editor Tom Colgan; this connection would later lead to Woodward writing for the Jack Ryan Jr. series.

Woodward drew from his background as a naval intelligence officer and later working in international business with Amazon, adding: "I was put in a position to observe all kinds of people who were working on a variety of big, global problems. This was a fortuitous quirk of fate for me—but it reinforced the core writing idea I’ve always had that regular people can have an outsize influence on major events.” On his decision to feature Meredith Morris-Dale as the protagonist, he said: "I felt strongly that it would be interesting to have the woman be the more career-centric person in the relationship. With her strong sense of duty, Meredith triumphs through sheer force of will, as opposed to physical brawn. Yes, I know she’s fictitious, but I find her mental toughness inspiring."

== Critical reception ==
Red Carpet Crash described The Handler as "a great debut novel that is all action from the very beginning, with great characters and a story that you want to keep on reading." Publishers Weekly gave a mixed review: "The author’s professional background lends credibility to the story, but by cycling through multiple points of view, Woodward slows down the pace."
