= Term Limits (novel) =

1997 political thriller novel by Vince Flynn

- 1997 First Edition Cover by Cloak & Dagger Press
- Author: Vince Flynn
- Language: English
- Genre: Political thriller
- Publisher: Cloak and Dagger, Incorporated
- Publication date: August 1997 (1st edition)
- Publication place: United States
- Media type: Print (hardcover)
- Pages: 403 (Hardcover~ edition)
- ISBN: 0-671-02317-9 (hardcover edition)
- OCLC: 38574209
- Dewey Decimal: 813/.54 21
- LC Class: PS3556.L94 T4 1997
- Preceded by: Kill Shot
- Followed by: Transfer of Power

Term Limits, published in 1997, is the first political thriller novel by Vince Flynn.

== Plot introduction ==
Three of Washington's most powerful politicians are executed. The assassins demand that the American government set aside partisan politics and restore power to the people, specifically a balanced budget amendment and term limits for all of Congress. Michael O'Rourke, a U.S. Marine turned Congressman finds out who they are and why they do it.

== Characters ==
The major characters in Term Limits include:

- President Jim Stevens – President of the United States
- Stu Garret – White House Chief of Staff
- Congressman Michael O'Rourke – Freshman Congressman from Minnesota and a U.S. Marine
- Mike Nance – National Security Advisor
- Brian Roach – Director of the FBI
- Skip McMahon – Special Agent in charge of the Investigation of the assassinations
- Dr. Irene Kennedy – CIA Terrorism Expert
- Thomas Stansfield – Director of the CIA
- Arthur Higgins – Retired CIA Director of Black Ops
- Scott Coleman – Former Navy SEAL, assassin team leader

== Publication history ==
- 1997, US, Cloak & Dagger Press, Incorporated ISBN 0-9658510-0-1, Pub August 1997, Hardback
- 1998, US, Atria Press ISBN 0-671-02317-9, Pub 1 June 1998, Hardback
- 1999, US, Pocket Star Books, Pub 1 January 1999, Mass Market Paperback
- 2003, US, Pocket Books, ISBN 0-7434-6824-4, Pub 2 June 2003, Paperback
- 2004, US, Atria ISBN 0-7432-7502-0, Pub 1 November 2004, Hardback
- 2007, US, Pocket Books ISBN 1-4165-1634-4, Pub 30 June 2007, Paperback
