= Jonathan Lemkin =

American screenwriter

Jonathan Lemkin is an American screenwriter. He has written for the television series 21 Jump Street, Beverly Hills, 90210, and Hill Street Blues. He has also written the films Showdown in Little Tokyo (uncredited, production script), Lethal Weapon 4, Red Planet, and adapted The Devil's Advocate and Shooter from novels.

Lemkin was the first (of many) writers who wrote unused scripts for the defunct film Superman Lives. He has also written a screenplay for the Vince Flynn novel Consent to Kill which is currently being shopped around.

Lemkin and actress Kiersten Warren-Acevedo were married in 1990 and divorced in 2005.
