= In the Blood (Carr novel) =

2022 novel by Jack Carr

- Hardcover edition
- Author: Jack Carr
- Language: English
- Series: The Terminal List
- Release number: 5
- Genre: Thriller
- Publisher: Atria/Emily Bestler Books
- Publication date: May 17, 2022
- Publication place: United States
- Media type: Print (hardback & paperback)
- Pages: 459
- ISBN: 978-1-9821-8165-9
- Preceded by: The Devil's Hand
- Followed by: Only the Dead

In the Blood is a thriller novel written by Jack Carr. It was Carr's fifth book in The Terminal List series, preceded by The Devil's Hand, and was followed by Only the Dead.

The book was released on May 17, 2022, by Atria/Emily Bestler Books.

== Plot ==
In Burkina Faso, Mossad assassin Aliya Galin boards a France flight under an alias after a sanctioned killing. Syrian sniper Nizar Kattan directs recruits to fire missiles at it, killing all 129 aboard. Hired to kill James Reece, Kattan joins Jean-Pierre Le Drian, a former French Foreign Legion mercenary, and a wheelchair-bound broker.

In Montana, Reece stays at the Hastings ranch with former SEAL teammate Raife Hastings. A news report names the victims, and Reece recognizes "Mélanie Cotillard" as Aliya. After a car bomb wounds her in Baghdad, Reece carries her to hospital. She admits her Mossad affiliation and asks him to tell her family she acted "for us."

In Moscow, SVR director Mikhail Gromyko fears a list compiled by Reece's father, Thomas, a former CIA officer killed by Russian agents. With FSB director Pavel Dashkov, he arranges Reece's death. Before leaving Montana, Reece hears Caroline Hastings urge him to return to Katie Buranek, his journalist girlfriend. He keeps his father's cryptic note.

CIA officer Vic Rodriguez confirms that the NSA tied Kattan to the plane attack. President Alec Christensen authorizes lethal force and sends Reece to Lackland Air Force Base. There, Reece meets Alice, an advanced AI that monitors electronic messages and locates Kattan through Le Drian's phone.

A CIA team captures Kattan, but a Russian recruit tries to kill Reece aboard their helicopter. Reece kills him; gunfire disables the aircraft. Kattan escapes the crash with a hidden razor and grenade. Reece survives by placing a body over the grenade.

In Israel, Mossad director Ronen Katz arranges Reece's meeting with Aliya's sister, Shiri Galin, who raises four children. Russian-backed attackers enter her home through a tunnel from Syria. Shiri is shot as Reece and escort Tuvia Yatom fight back. A teenage bomber kills Shiri and Tuvia. Katz names broker Saul Abelard, a former Mossad agent crippled in Berlin.

In Turin, Reece meets Abelard, who denies knowing about the plane attack. Alice warns of a bomb in a delivery backpack. Reece traps it in a safe, limiting the blast. Russian attackers storm Abelard's bookshop. Reece kills six; Abelard shoots the seventh. The dying Russian says Gromyko ordered Reece's death.

In Montenegro, Reece finds Kattan in the Durmitor mountains. He kills Le Drian, tricks Kattan with a false rifle position, then kills him with his dead teammate Freddy's tomahawk. Abelard assists from a hillside.

In Moscow, Alice lures Gromyko to Gorky Park. Reece strangles him; Gromyko takes cyanide. Back in Montana, Reece plans to propose to Katie, but FBI agents surround the ranch after President Christensen dies in a parade bombing. They arrest Reece over a suspected plan to kill the president. He slips Katie the engagement band before surrendering.

== Reception ==
In the Blood received a positive review from Publishers Weekly, which praised the novel's action and final confrontation between James Reece and his adversary. The review concluded that readers of military action fiction would find the book satisfying. The novel also received favorable endorsements from Military.com and The Real Book Spy, which praised its action, scope, and place within the Terminal List series.
