= The Devil's Hand (novel) =

2021 novel by Jack Carr

- Hardcover edition
- Author: Jack Carr
- Language: English
- Series: The Terminal List
- Release number: 4
- Genre: Thriller
- Publisher: Atria/Emily Bestler Books
- Publication date: April 13, 2021
- Publication place: United States
- Media type: Print (hardback & paperback)
- Pages: 524
- ISBN: 978-1-9821-2374-1
- Preceded by: Savage Son
- Followed by: In the Blood

The Devil's Hand is a thriller novel written by Jack Carr. It was Carr's fourth book in The Terminal List series, preceded by Savage Son, and was followed by In the Blood.

The book was released on April 13, 2021, by Atria/Emily Bestler Books.

== Plot ==
On September 11, 2001, Aliyah Hajjar, a cleaner at Logan International Airport, hides box cutters on a flight to Los Angeles. In New York City, Alec Christensen watches the second plane strike the World Trade Center, killing his fiancée, Jen.

Years later, former U.S. Navy SEAL James Reece takes a polygraph for the CIA. Vic Rodriguez approves him despite the results because he values Reece's abilities. President Christensen summons Reece to Camp David. He states that laws passed after 9/11 allow him to target those who assisted the attacks. He gives Reece a list of targets living in the United States and orders their deaths. He also asks Reece to identify the man who met Mohamed Atta in Maine on September 10, 2001.

Iranian agent Ali Reza Ansari meets intelligence chief Hafez Qassem in Washington, D.C., to obtain a pathogen. Ali and student Sebastian Phillips cultivate the virus in Denver. The pathogen is a Soviet weaponized version of Marburg Variant U.

Reece begins in Chicago, watching Kareem Talib. Ali poisons Talib to conceal his presence, Reece tracks Sohrab Behzad to Atlanta and kills him. Ali photographs Reece and alerts Iran, he then distributes the virus in Texas and Colorado using aerosol devices, the hospitals fill with patients. The authorities believe the disease is a natural, airborne Ebola mutation. The military seals the cities, President Christensen considers burning the infected zones to prevent a national disaster.

Reece and Katie Buranek survive an attack by an Iranian team. Katie and Haley Garrett, a doctor, suspect the virus was engineered to appear airborne. If confirmed, the President can avoid destroying the cities. Senator Edward Thwaite and Erik Sawyer monitor Reece, hoping to damage the President. They release footage of Reece to portray him as a killer.

To establish the virus's origin, Reece and Haley enter Fort Detrick to obtain a Soviet sample for comparison. Reece raids the Denver laboratory, but Ali has set it ablaze. Reece captures Ali and forces him to confess. Ali admits the pathogen is Marburg Variant U and that Qassem directed the operation.

Reece and Haley submit the evidence to the CIA. The President cancels the planned strikes on the cities. Reece sends Ali's head to Qassem. He later captures Qassem, who admits meeting Atta in Maine to order the September 11 attacks. Reece allows him to board a flight, but the President orders the aircraft shot down over the ocean.

Reece tracks Thwaite and Sawyer to an island. Thwaite kills Sawyer and takes his own life. The President later tells Reece that he used the evidence of the biological attack to compel Iran to halt its weapons programs. Reece travels to Iran to find General Ja'far al-Sadiq, the man responsible for the 1983 bombing and the September 11 attacks. Reece kills him and leaves Jen's ring in his hand.

== Reception ==
Publishers Weekly praised Carr's use of historical context and contemporary events, along with his graphic depictions of violence, noting that military-action fans would find much to enjoy. Booklist commended Carr's military experience and the realism it brings to his writing. Bookreporter offered a more critical assessment, questioning the book's depictions of violence and its treatment of Islam, while acknowledging its forceful examination of human nature and conflict.
