= Red Sky Mourning =

2024 novel by Jack Carr

- Hardcover edition
- Author: Jack Carr
- Language: English
- Series: The Terminal List
- Release number: 7
- Genre: Thriller
- Publisher: Atria/Emily Bestler Books
- Publication date: June 18, 2024
- Publication place: United States
- Media type: Print (hardback & paperback)
- Pages: 562
- ISBN: 978-1-6680-4707-1
- Preceded by: Only the Dead

Red Sky Mourning is a thriller novel written by Jack Carr. It was Carr's seventh book in The Terminal List series, preceded by Only the Dead.

The book was released on June 18, 2024, by Atria/Emily Bestler Books.

== Plot ==
Commander Liu Zhen of China's People's Liberation Navy prepares to fire missiles from the submarine Chang Zheng toward Hawaii. He believes the attack will enable China to seize Taiwan. The USS Reagan, commanded by Ray Mendoza, destroys his submarine before the strike can proceed.

The loss triggers a transfer of U.S. Navy plans to a Utah facility, where Elba Industries, headed by Andrew Hart, acquires them. Hart uses Napoleon, a computer system, to pass the plans to China. In Montana, former Navy SEAL James Reece lives with Katie Buranek. CIA officer Vic Rodriguez asks Reece to speak with Alice, an advanced computer that communicates only with him. The CIA hopes Alice can prevent China's assault on Taiwan. Meanwhile, presidential candidate Christine Harding joins Hart and Chinese leaders in a scheme to secure her election by pledging to allow China's expansion.

Reece contacts Alice through a headset, but armed attackers descend on his ranch. Reece and members of the Hastings family repel them. A sniper wounds Katie, who is taken to hospital. Realizing that the assault targets both him and Alice, Reece agrees to assist the CIA. Rodriguez briefs him in San Francisco on OVERMATCH, a Navy artificial-intelligence program China wants destroyed.

Reece travels to Macau, where Chen Yun offers him money to stop Alice. He refuses and escapes another attack. Filipino police capture him and hand him over to Chinese agent Ba Jin, who tortures him for access to sensitive data. A CIA rescue team frees Reece. He forces Jin to disclose Hart's plan: launch a missile from an island to destroy satellites, depriving American forces of communications and surveillance while China attacks Taiwan. Reece and his allies parachute into the sea near Hart's island, Corelena.

President Gale Olsen manages the unfolding emergency in Washington. Alice overheats Napoleon, destroying the rival computer, but the missile remains ready for launch. Reece's team enters Corelena and battles armed guards before finding a route to the launch facility. During the assault, teammate Ox dies saving Reece. Reece travels through an underwater passage, kills security chief Tim Perkins, and advances toward the launch area.

Inside a bunker, Reece confronts Hart and General Ian Novak. He kills Novak, then Hart. With little time remaining, Reece reaches a boat and obtains a torch. He moves the barge carrying the rocket beneath an overhead cover. The missile strikes the structure and explodes. Alice creates a false nuclear attack to compel both nations to halt hostilities. She warns Reece that Chinese missiles are being sent to erase evidence. Reece extracts a tracker from his head, leaves it behind to attract a strike, and dives into the water.

Later, the president holds a memorial service for Reece. Katie receives money from a former enemy. Raife and Jonathan Hastings kill Christine Harding at the Montana ranch. In Malta, Katie encounters a man living beside the sea. Reece has survived and now lives quietly, far from his former life.

== Reception ==
Red Sky Mourning received positive reviews from thriller critics and readers. Ryan Steck of The Real Book Spy praised the novel for its fast-paced action, detailed combat sequences, and psychological depth, calling it “a masterpiece of absolute mayhem.” Steck also commended Jack Carr's portrayal of James Reece and the novel's combination of geopolitical threats, artificial intelligence, and international intrigue.

The publisher, Simon & Schuster, highlighted the novel's high-stakes premise and described it as a high-octane thriller inspired by contemporary events.
