= Only the Dead (novel) =

2023 novel by Jack Carr

- Hardcover edition
- Author: Jack Carr
- Language: English
- Series: The Terminal List
- Release number: 6
- Genre: Thriller
- Publisher: Atria/Emily Bestler Books
- Publication date: May 16, 2023
- Publication place: United States
- Media type: Print (hardback & paperback)
- Pages: 564
- ISBN: 978-1-9821-8169-7
- Preceded by: In the Blood
- Followed by: Red Sky Mourning

Only the Dead is a thriller novel written by Jack Carr. It was Carr's sixth book in The Terminal List series, preceded by In the Blood, and was followed by Red Sky Mourning.

The book was released on May 16, 2023, by Atria/Emily Bestler Books.

== Plot ==
In 1980, Congressman Walter Stowe, a former Navy sailor from Vietnam, docks at the New York Yacht Club with his wife, Martha. A man posing as a harbor master shoots Stowe and wounds Martha, who recalls his secret dealings with CIA officer Tom Reece about agency abuses.

Years on, Tom's son finds at James Reece, a former Navy SEAL sniper sits at ADX Florence, accused of helping kill President Alec Christensen. Russian agents planted evidence against him after arranging the president's assassination. Alice, a computer beneath Lackland Air Force Base, proves the evidence false, securing Reece's release after three months. CIA officer Vic Rodriguez sends him to retired agent William Poe at a Colorado ranch.

Poe says Tom and Stowe found evidence that American prisoners captured during Vietnam had been transferred to Soviet territory. A 1981 rescue mission was sabotaged by a press leak. Tom kept records naming an alliance of American and Russian elites who enriched themselves through financial bets tied to manufactured crises. Tom's letter admits he spent years killing men who betrayed the prisoners.

Russian agents attack Poe's ranch, but Reece, former SEAL teammate Raife Hastings, and Poe kill them. Martha confirms Tom's papers remain in a Boston bank vault. Reece opens it with his father's passcode and the phrase "trust no one." He copies the papers and hides the weapons. Retired CIA analyst Andy Danreb translates the documents, confirming the prisoner cover-up and naming the group "the Collective."

Reece obtains Morgan Holdings chairman Sidney Morgan's client list and captures New York crime boss Luka Yevgenievich. Yevgenievich says the Collective meets on Cyprus and has an informant within the CIA, then dies under questioning.

President Gale Olsen tells Reece that Kira Borisova, aide to Russian security chief Pavel Dashkov, wants to defect from Cyprus with evidence of a plan to detonate a nuclear device near Israel. Reece travels there with Poe. At a resort, Wagner chief Andrei Sokoloff drugs Reece and takes him aboard a trawler carrying the device. Kira is held beside him. When a Russian commander shoots her, Reece jumps overboard with her body.

Reece escapes underwater and kills the remaining guards. Following Danreb's instructions, he heats propane tanks beside the device. The blast disrupts its nuclear detonation sequence, scattering plutonium without a nuclear explosion. After reaching Israel, Reece joins Israeli commandos on Cyprus, kills Dashkov, and drives Sokoloff's car off a cliff.

Back in Colorado, Poe admits he belongs to the Collective, sabotaged the rescue mission, and ordered Tom's death. Reece says he copied the papers and sent them to major news outlets. Poe walks into the Taylor River and drowns. Reece returns to Montana with Katie as reports announce the Russian president's detention and criminal charges against Morgan Holdings. He burns Tom's letter and joins Katie and their dogs at the ranch cabin.

== Reception ==
Only the Dead received a highly favorable review from Ryan Steck of The Real Book Spy, who awarded the novel a rating of 10 out of 10. Steck praised Jack Carr's writing, the book's realism, and its intense action sequences, describing it as a standout entry in the James Reece series. He also commended Carr's portrayal of Reece's emotional struggles and the novel's appeal to both established readers and newcomers.

Bookreporter presented the novel as a political thriller featuring a far-reaching conspiracy, assassinations, and a mission connected to events spanning several decades. The publisher, Simon & Schuster, also highlighted the book's action sequences and its depiction of Reece confronting powerful adversaries.
