= Savage Son =

2020 novel by Jack Carr

- Hardcover edition
- Author: Jack Carr
- Language: English
- Series: The Terminal List
- Release number: 3
- Genre: Thriller
- Publisher: Atria/Emily Bestler Books
- Publication date: April 14, 2020
- Publication place: United States
- Media type: Print (hardback & paperback)
- Pages: 419
- ISBN: 978-1-9821-2370-3
- Preceded by: True Believer
- Followed by: The Devil's Hand

Savage Son is a thriller novel written by Jack Carr. It was Carr's third book in The Terminal List series, preceded by True Believer, and was followed by The Devil's Hand.

The book was released on April 14, 2020, by Atria/Emily Bestler Books.

== Plot ==
On Medny Island, a woman flees across the snow while Aleksandr Zharkov and Sergei pursue her. She falls from a cliff and dies. Aleksandr decides to hunt more difficult prey. In Montana, former U.S. Navy SEAL James Reece recovers from brain surgery at a ranch owned by Raife Hastings's family. Jonathan and Hanna welcome Reece as he heals.

In Saint Petersburg, Oliver Grey offers assistance to Ivan Zharkov, a Russian crime boss. Grey wants protection and shares knowledge of American intelligence assets. He offers to kill Reece, and Ivan assigns him the task. Using his knowledge of CIA financial transfers, Grey locates Reece in Montana and dispatches two teams to America. Dimitry Mashkov commands the unit assigned to kill Reece, while another targets Raife to prevent retaliation. Aleksandr informs a CIA contact about the attack, and Vic Rodriguez calls Reece shortly before the assault begins.

Reece escapes the ambush and returns to the ranch. The second unit attacks Raife while he is hunting. Reece and Jonathan fight back, killing the attackers. Annika and Katie Buranek defend the house alongside the survivors. Most of the Russians die, but Reece captures Dimitry. Under questioning, Dimitry admits that Grey serves Ivan and that Aleksandr operates a hunting ground on Medny Island. He also says Aleksandr alerted the CIA to the mission to draw Reece and Raife to the island.

The family learns that Hanna has been abducted in Romania to serve as bait. Raife travels there but finds a message directing him to arrange a hunt on Medny Island. The U.S. government refuses to authorize a rescue because of the risk of confrontation with Russia. Reece and Raife assemble former military operators and use Hastings aircraft to launch their mission. The team enters Russian airspace and lands on the island, where Aleksandr's pulse weapon disables their equipment.

Reece and his team advance toward the lodge and encounter armed guards. They use flares to disrupt the guards' night vision, killing several enemies while suffering losses themselves. Inside, they find a prison and learn Hanna is dead. Raife, captured earlier, has been released into the wilderness as prey. Reece leaves his companions at the extraction site and follows Aleksandr and Raife into the mountains.

Reece encounters Sergei and kills him after a fight. Raife attacks Aleksandr on a cliff, and both fall to the beach below. Raife suffers broken bones, while Aleksandr survives and attempts to kill him. Reece arrives and kills Aleksandr. A U.S. submarine collects the survivors and Raife's sister's body, but Reece remains on the island. He tells Jonathan that he must continue his pursuit of Grey and heads into the woods.

Six months later, Reece travels across Russia while avoiding detection. He locates Ivan and Grey at a house and destroys their guards with explosives and a rifle. During the ensuing confrontation, Reece kills Grey with a mine. He spares Ivan in exchange for assistance escaping Russia and locating a sniper. Reece returns to the United States and meets Katie. He finds a car and a letter from his father, then renews his commitment to continue fighting.

== Reception ==
In its review of Savage Son, Publishers Weekly praised Carr's military authenticity and geopolitical realism. The publication commended the combat sequences and the author's command of his large cast, although it noted that extensive backstories sometimes slowed the pacing. The review recommended the novel to fans of Vince Flynn while cautioning that admirers of John le Carré might find it lacking in subtlety and subtext.
