= How to See Yourself as You Really Are =

Book by Tenzin Gyatso

How to See Yourself As You Really Are
- Author: Tenzin Gyatso, 14th Dalai Lama
- Language: English
- Genre: Philosophy
- Publisher: Atria
- Media type: Print
- ISBN: 0-7432-9045-3
- Dewey Decimal: 294.3/422 22
- LC Class: BQ7935.B774 H69 2006

How to See Yourself As You Really Are is a 2006 book by Tenzin Gyatso, the 14th Dalai Lama.

== Overview ==
The concept of the book as taught by the Dalai Lama is that human beings each possess the ability to achieve happiness and a meaningful life, but the key to attaining that goal is self-knowledge. He teaches how to avoid the common negative notions of self and perspective on life and how to see the world from a more loving, human viewpoint. Using personal experiences and anecdotes, the Dalai Lama explains the idea that combining meditative concentration and love, true enlightenment is attained and is the key to happiness.

He concludes the book, saying, "Even though it is necessary in the beginning to have a strong will in order to develop love and compassion, will is not sufficient to develop these altruistic attitudes limitlessly. It is important to join the practice of love and compassion with the practice of insight. Even if you seek to help someone out of concern, without insight you cannot be very clear about what benefit will come of your efforts. A combination is needed: a good human heart as well as a good human brain. Working together, we can achieve a lot."
