= True Believer (Carr novel) =

2019 thriller novel by Jack Carr

- Hardcover edition
- Author: Jack Carr
- Language: English
- Series: The Terminal List
- Release number: 2
- Genre: Thriller
- Publisher: Atria/Emily Bestler Books
- Publication date: July 30, 2019
- Publication place: United States
- Media type: Print (hardback & paperback)
- Pages: 485
- ISBN: 978-1-5011-8084-2
- Preceded by: The Terminal List
- Followed by: Savage Son

True Believer is a thriller novel written by Jack Carr. It was Carr's second book in The Terminal List series, preceded by The Terminal List, and was followed by Savage Son.

The book was released on July 30, 2019, by Atria/Emily Bestler Books.

The basis of the book was adapted to the screen for the second season of The Terminal List television series.

== Plot summary ==
Terrorists attack a Christmas market in London, where a van explosion drives survivors into an area guarded by machine gunners and suicide bombers. From a secure room in Switzerland, former Russian GRU Colonel Vasili Andrenov watches the massacre he planned to manipulate financial markets. Across the Atlantic, James Reece sails aboard the yacht Bitter Harvest.

Having fled the United States after killing those responsible for the deaths of his wife, daughter, and SEAL teammates, Reece believes a brain tumor will soon kill him. He travels to Mozambique, where Richard Hastings, uncle of Raife Hastings, runs a safari concession. Reece attempts to live quietly at the camp and helps protect wildlife from poachers using a drone.

Attacks strike Europe, including a mortar assault on British paratroopers and a drone strike on a NATO general. In Mozambique, Reece rescues tracker Solomon during a fight with poachers. To obtain medical care for the wounded man, Reece exposes his location, attracting CIA attention.

Freddy Strain, a former teammate, arrives and tells Reece that his tumor is treatable. He offers a deal: the United States will pardon Reece and his associates if he helps locate Mohammed "Mo" Farooq, a former Iraqi officer and Reece's friend. Mo is suspected of coordinating European attacks for Amin Nawaz.

Reece accepts and travels to a desert compound to train with Strain. Their facility comes under attack, and both men fight back, but their instructor, Maajid, dies. An examination of the attackers identifies them as members of Mo's former CIA-trained Iraqi unit.

Reece and Strain travel to Istanbul to locate Mo. Reece acts as bait and is captured by Mo's men. Mo insists he is not a terrorist and believes he has been carrying out secret CIA assignments under Jules Landry. Reece recognizes that Landry is operating independently and using Mo to conduct attacks for another party.

Reece and Strain persuade CIA officials to let them recruit Mo instead of killing him. In Albania, they support a raid against Nawaz. Unable to shoot because a child is nearby, they coordinate with Mo to kill Nawaz as he leaves.

Mo captures Landry in Kurdistan. Landry admits he serves Oliver Grey, a senior CIA analyst who has spied for Andrenov since the Cold War. Andrenov and Grey have recruited Syrian general Qusim Yedid to hire gunmen for an operation in Odessa, Ukraine. Mo kills Landry.

Reece and Strain join the Secret Service in Odessa before a meeting between the Russian and American presidents. They identify gunmen Nizar and Tasho aboard a ship in the harbor and learn of a planned Novichok nerve-agent attack. During the presidential appearance, the gunmen fire, killing the Russian president while the American president survives. Strain fights a Russian sniper on a rooftop but dies at Nizar's hands.

Reece enters underground tunnels, kills the attackers preparing the chemical device, and reverses a fan to contain the toxin, saving Odessa. After returning Strain's body to the United States, Reece meets CIA officer Vic Rodriguez, who confirms the pardons and offers him employment. Reece declines and receives a folder containing the remaining targets' locations.

In Athens, Reece questions General Yedid about Grey and Nizar, then kills him with Novichok-laced vodka. In Basel, Reece destroys Andrenov's car with a rocket as Mo creates a distraction. Raife Hastings drives Reece away. In the United States, federal agents arrest Stewart McGovern on Christmas Eve. In Argentina, Grey awaits a call from Russia that never arrives. In South Carolina, Strain's widow receives confirmation of a trust fund for her son, funded by the reward for Nawaz's death.

== Reception ==
Publishers Weekly gave True Believer a positive review, praising Carr's writing, military expertise, spycraft, and satisfying conclusion. The publication noted that the novel follows familiar genre conventions but stands out through its technical knowledge and engaging prose.

Kirkus Reviews described the novel as a well-crafted thriller with timely commentary on international terrorism. The reviewer praised its momentum and Reece's characterization, while noting that the redaction of names and places could be excessive.
