= Life Inside =

2002 book by Mindy Lewis

Life Inside: A Memoir
- Author: Mindy Lewis
- Language: English
- Publisher: Atria Publishing Group
- Publication date: October 22, 2002 (hardcover); November 4, 2003 (paperback reprint)
- Pages: 368
- ISBN: 978-0-7434-1149-3

Life Inside: A Memoir is a 2002 memoir by Mindy Lewis that describes her time as a teenager in a New York psychiatric hospital in the late 1960s. Published by Atria Publishing Group, the book was reviewed in a number of publications.
