= The Terminal List (novel) =

2018 novel by Jack Carr

- Hardcover edition
- Author: Jack Carr
- Language: English
- Series: The Terminal List
- Release number: 1
- Genre: Thriller
- Publisher: Atria/Emily Bestler Books
- Publication date: March 6, 2018
- Publication place: United States
- Media type: Print (hardback & paperback)
- Pages: 407
- ISBN: 978-1-5011-8081-1
- OCLC: 1024081536
- Dewey Decimal: 813/.6
- LC Class: PS3603.A774235 T4 2018
- Followed by: True Believer

The Terminal List is a thriller novel written by American author Jack Carr. It was Carr's first book in The Terminal List series, followed by True Believer. In the novel, James Reece seeks justice for his murdered SEAL team. The book was released on March 6, 2018, by Atria/Emily Bestler Books.

The Terminal List has been adapted into a television series of the same name with Amazon Prime Video.

== Plot ==
In Wyoming, U.S. Navy SEAL James Reece kills investment banker Marcus Boykin with a long-distance rifle shot. Reece crosses Boykin's name off a list written on the back of a drawing made by his daughter.

Three months earlier in Afghanistan, Reece and his platoon are ambushed while approaching a suspected terrorist compound. Only Reece and his friend Boozer survive. NCIS agents question Reece about the failed mission, appearing more interested in blaming him than determining what happened. Reece reports his concerns about the intelligence supporting the mission, but the agents dismiss them. He begins experiencing headaches, which he attributes to the ambush. A doctor at the base recommends additional medical tests when Reece returns home.

After returning to Coronado, Reece learns that Boozer has died in an apparent suicide. He rushes to the scene, where DCIS agent Josh Holder tells him that Boozer killed himself. Reece suspects a coverup. When he arrives home, he finds that his wife and young daughter have been murdered during what appears to be a robbery.

Reece considers suicide but learns that the killers were not local criminals, leading him to believe that he was the intended target. Medical tests show that he has a brain tumor expected to kill him within several months. Believing he has little time left, Reece decides to pursue those responsible for his platoon's deaths and the murder of his family.

With help from Ben Edwards, a former SEAL and CIA Ground Branch operative, Reece investigates a scheme involving military personnel and a pharmaceutical company run by Steve Horn. He also meets journalist Katie Buranek, who is investigating the deaths of Reece's teammates. Katie finds that the other members of Reece's platoon also developed brain tumors after receiving an experimental drug intended to block post-traumatic stress disorder. The men received the drug without their knowledge. After the tumors were identified, their fatal mission was arranged to conceal the experiments. Boozer and Reece's family were killed to prevent the truth from becoming public.

Reece compiles a list of those responsible, including Holder, Horn, his associate Saul Agnon, attorney Mike Tedesco, Admiral Pilsner, JAG officer Leonard Howard, Boykin, the cartel gunmen who murdered his family, an imam working with Al-Qaeda, and U.S. Secretary of Defense Lorraine Hartley and her husband, JD. Reece names it his "terminal list."

Reece kills Boykin and Holder, extracts information from Agnon before killing him with a heroin overdose, and travels to Mexico to kill the gunmen responsible for his family's deaths. He kills the imam, who arranged the ambush, and makes the death appear to be a hate crime. Howard flees to Florida, but Reece tracks him down with help from pilot Liz Riley and wounds him fatally with a tomahawk. Reece then forces Tedesco to wear a suicide vest into Pilsner's office, killing both men in the explosion.

Hartley illegally orders SEAL Team Six to kill Reece and labels him a domestic terrorist. Reece avoids capture and travels to New York to pursue Horn and Hartley. He kills JD Hartley with an explosively formed penetrator device before escaping with help from former SEAL teammate Raife Hastings, who lends him a sailboat and directs him toward a family hunting preserve in Africa.

Reece attacks Hartley's house on Fisher's Island, where he finds that Katie has been kidnapped by Ben. Ben admits that he helped arrange the scheme and threatens to kill Katie using explosives attached to a dead man's switch. Reece kills Horn and Hartley, then executes Ben after recognizing that his threat was a bluff. Reece and Katie recover documents establishing Hartley's role in the scheme. When Katie asks how Reece knew Ben was bluffing, Reece admits he did not, leaving Katie to publish the findings herself.

Believing his tumor will soon kill him, Reece crosses the remaining names off his list and throws it into the ocean as he sails across the Atlantic. Unknown to him, his doctor leaves a voicemail explaining that the tumor is not fatal and can be removed through surgery.

== Reception ==
In a review for Publishers Weekly, the debut novel by Jack Carr received a mixed assessment. The reviewer praised Carr's knowledge of weaponry and the construction of individual combat sequences, while criticizing familiar revenge themes, predictable turns, and overheated prose. The review concluded that Carr showed promise and that fans of military action fiction would anticipate his next book.
