= Singularity Sky =

2003 science fiction novel by Charles Stross

- Cover of first US edition (hardcover)
- Author: Charles Stross
- Cover artist: Danilo Ducak
- Language: English
- Genre: Science fiction
- Publisher: Ace Books
- Publication date: 1 July 2003
- Publication place: United Kingdom
- Media type: Print (hardback & paperback)
- Pages: 400
- ISBN: 0-441-01072-5
- OCLC: 51900227
- Dewey Decimal: 813/.6 21
- LC Class: PR6119.T79 S56 2003
- Followed by: Iron Sunrise

Singularity Sky is a science fiction novel by British writer Charles Stross, published in 2003. A sequel, Iron Sunrise, was published that same year. Together the two are referred to as the Eschaton novels, after a near-godlike intelligence that exists in both.

The novel follows the ill-fated military campaign by a repressive state, the New Republic, to retaliate for a perceived invasion of one of its colony worlds. In actuality, the planet has been visited by the Festival, a technologically advanced alien or posthuman race that rewards its hosts for "entertaining" them by granting whatever the entertainer wishes, including the Festival's own technology. This causes extensive social, economic and political disruption to the colony, which was generally limited by the New Republic to technology equivalent to that found on Earth during the Industrial Revolution. Aboard the New Republic's flagship, an engineer and an intelligence operative from Earth covertly attempt to prevent the use of a forbidden technology—and fall in love along the way.

Themes of the novel include transhumanism, the impact of a sudden technological singularity on a repressive society, and the need for free information. Its narrative encompasses space opera and elements of steampunk and science fantasy. Intertwined within are social and political satire, and Stross's trademark dark humour and subtle literary and cultural allusions.

Stross wrote the novel during the late 1990s, his first attempt at the form. It was not his first novel to be published, but it was the first to be originally published in book form. Its original title, Festival of Fools, was changed to avoid confusion with Richard Paul Russo's Ship of Fools. The book was well received, and earned a nomination for the Hugo Award for Best Novel in 2004. Writers have cited the book in explanations of the titular concept. Its exploration of free information helped to inspire a proposal to give every Afghan a free mobile phone to combat the Taliban.

== Background ==
Singularity Sky takes place roughly in the early 23rd century, around 150 years after an event referred to by the characters as the Singularity. Shortly after the Earth's population topped 10 billion, computing technology began reaching the point where artificial intelligence could exceed that of humans through the use of closed timelike curves to send information to its past. Suddenly, one day, 90% of the population inexplicably disappeared.

Messages left behind, both on computer networks and in monuments placed on the Earth and other planets of the inner Solar System carry a short statement from the apparent perpetrator of this event:

"I am the Eschaton; I am not your God.
I am descended from you, and exist in your future.
Thou shalt not violate causality within my historic light cone. Or else."

Earth collapses politically and economically in the wake of this population crash; the Internet Engineering Task Force eventually assumes the mantle of the United Nations, or at least its altruistic mission and charitable functions. Anarchism replaces the Westphalian nation-states; in the novel the UN is described as having 900 of the planet's 15,000 polities as members, and its membership is not limited to polities.

A century later, the first interstellar missions, using quantum tunnelling-based jump drives to provide effective faster-than-light travel without violating causality, are launched. One that reaches Barnard's Star finds what happened to those who disappeared from Earth: they were sent to colonise other planets via wormholes that took them back one year in time for every light-year (ly) the star was from Earth. Gradually, it is learned, these colonies were scattered across a 6,000-ly area of the galaxy, all with the same message from the Eschaton etched onto a prominent monument somewhere. There is also evidence that the Eschaton has enforced the "or else" through drastic measures, such as inducing supernovae or impact events on the civilisation that attempted to create causality-violating technology.

Earth and the colonies re-establish relations and trade. Some of the latter had regained the same, or higher, technological levels due in part to the "cornucopia machines", molecular assemblers that can recreate objects in predefined patterns or duplicate others, the Eschaton left them with. Transhumanist technologies that came into being before or during the Singularity, such as cybernetic implants, anti-aging and life extension treatments, are in wide use. Spaceships use antimatter, fusion and electron-sized black holes as propulsion.

Some colonies, however, rejected or restricted use of advanced technology for social, cultural or political reasons, and instead of developing into anarchism as Earth did, have replicated politically restrictive states from Earth's history. The novel takes place on two planets of one such polity, the New Republic. Its original settlers were predominantly from Eastern Europe, where many recalled the economic dislocation that followed the fall of communism there. The victorious side in an earlier civil war destroyed the sole remaining cornucopia machine, and imposed a socially and politically repressive feudalist regime that limits most technology to a level consistent with Europe at the end of the 19th century to guarantee everyone a place in society, with accompanying Victorian social mores. Despite this, there are still those who rebel and plan uprisings, along similar lines to those that happened in the historical Eastern Europe of that era.

== Plot ==
The Festival, a civilisation of uploaded minds, arrives at Rochard's World, an outlying colony of the New Republic, and begins breaking down objects in the system to make technology for its stay. It contacts the inhabitants by dropping cell phones, forbidden to most citizens, from low orbit. Those who answer hear its offer: tell the Festival something it has not heard, and receive anything they wish for. Burya Rubenstein, exiled to the colony for leading an uprising, asks for a cornucopia machine in return for a political tract on the disruptive effect a sudden singularity would have on repressive regimes. Within days a post-scarcity economy develops, and the government is threatened by Rubenstein's uprising and its advanced weaponry. A naval detachment challenges the Festival but is destroyed.

In the New Republic's capital, New Prague, 40 light-years away, deep cover UN agent Rachel Mansour watches the New Republic prepare a military response. It misunderstands the Festival and underestimates its military capabilities. Rachel is more concerned that it may approach Rochard's World via a closed timelike loop, a violation of causality that could provoke the Eschaton into forcing the evacuation of many settled worlds. She recruits Martin Springfield, an Earth-based engineer hired by the Admiralty to upgrade its drive systems, to watch for signs of such a plan. Unknown to her, Martin is an agent of the Eschaton, assigned to sabotage the plan just enough to make it seem unworkable.

On Rochard's World, Rubenstein is disappointed that his revolution's cadres have become as rigid as the hegemony they fight. He is visited by Sister Stratagems the Seventh, a giant mole rat-like Critic who accompanies the Festival, and who has come to find out why the inhabitants seem uninterested in its wisdom. She faults him for relying on revolutionary traditions in the midst of a singularity, and takes him in Baba Yaga's hut to the northern city of Plotsk. On the way he sees a transformed landscape, with farms floating in geodesic spheres and dangerous self-replicating robots roaming the countryside.

Rachel drops her cover and is assigned to the flagship Lord Vanek as a diplomatic observer, and Martin joins the fleet to finish his sabotage. As the only Terran civilians aboard, they fall in love. Martin's 16-microsecond error in the drive code slightly delays the fleet, which jumps four thousand years into the future before reaching Rochard's World. Vassily Muller, a young secret police agent, has Martin arrested as a spy in a fake court-martial meant to trap Rachel into revealing herself. Instead, Rachel incapacitates everyone in the courtroom, rescues Martin, and escapes with him in a lifeboat fabricated by her own cornucopia machine. Vassily is sucked into space with other crewmembers when they try to break in, but survives in emergency protective gear and is picked up by Rachel and Martin.

The fleet confronts two Bouncers sent by the Festival and is consumed by grey goo, though the senior staff escape. Martin and Rachel are unsurprised, and explain to an angry Vassily that, despite its lack of intentions, the Festival was an existential threat to the Republic since information wants to be free.

At Plotsk, where skyscrapers of stratospheric height have been erected, Rubenstein realises that the revolution has outgrown him. Many citizens have transcended their humanity, and Rubenstein is himself implanted with a brain/computer interface. He, Stratagems and his former comrades go looking for the former governor, who is found mummified on a hillside, having been saved from zombification by the Mimes, another associated species, with an X-ray laser blast that exposed his body to dangerous ionizing radiation. The governor asks, through the implant, to join the Festival. Martin and Rachel then arrive, and she gives Rubenstein a cornucopia machine, her original mission, which is no longer necessary. Vassily appears and tries to kill Rubenstein, identifying himself as his son, but Rachel stops him with a stun gun, although he irreversibly damages the machine.

The Festival and its associated species leave, and the population regroups. Those who want to return to life under the New Republic settle in Novy Petrograd, where the senior officers from the Lord Vanek have re-established imperial authority. Rubenstein and the others go to Plotsk, where Martin and Rachel run a small shop offering "access to tools and ideas" until they can return to Earth nine months later.

== Characters ==
- Rachel Mansour, a black operations agent for the United Nations Committee on Multilateral Interstellar Disarmament. A 150-year-old native of Earth who appears to be in her 20s due to anti-aging treatments, she has cybernetic implants that can speed up her nervous system for short periods of time, usually in combat situations, but will render her unconscious if used for too long.
- Martin Springfield, a freelance engineer originally from the People's Republic of West Yorkshire, although he has not lived there for 20 years. He has a daughter from a previous marriage he rarely sees. For the past ten years he has supplemented his income by working for the Eschaton, who contacts him under the name "Herman."
- Vassily Muller, a young recruit to the Curator's Office, the secret police of the New Republic. He has worked hard to overcome the stigma of being Burya Rubenstein's son, and is his father's political opposite, fully committed to the ideologies of the New Republic.

=== The Lord Vanek ===
- Admiral Kurtz, the aged war hero nominally in command of the entire fleet. After two strokes, he is suffering severe dementia and uses a wheelchair. He believes he is pregnant with an elephant.
- Robard, his attendant, actually a high-ranking member of the secret police.
- Captain Mirsky, a veteran and former instructor at the naval college who believes he never made flag rank due to his attempt to warn the Admiralty about enemies like the Festival that might use self-replicating robot weapons.
- Ilya Murametz, his executive officer.
- Chief Engineer Kravchuk.
- Security Chief Sauer, who secretly resents Muller's presence aboard and arranges Martin's trial as a way to embarrass Muller and, by extension, his boss. It ends tragically for him.

=== Rochard's World ===
- Burya Rubenstein, a onetime revolutionary leader sent to Rochard's World for 20 years of internal exile. He advocates for "Marxism-Gilderism", a libertarian political system using rhetoric similar to that used to promote communism. Its slogan is "from each according to his imagination, to each according to his need."
- Oleg Timoshevsky, his lieutenant and an early adopter of the transhumanist technology offered by the Festival.
- Sister Strategems the Seventh. One of the Critics. She leaves her race's orbital station to find more directly whether the Rochardians are sapient.
- Duke Felix Politkovsky: Originally the governor of Rochard's World. Under fire, the Festival grants his wish to become a young boy again, with three loyal anthropomorphic animal companions, and have exciting and interesting adventures—a choice he eventually comes to regret. Ultimately he decides to leave the planet and join the Festival.
- Mr. Rabbit: One of the younger Felix's animal companions, who helps protect him from the Mimes and leads the revolutionaries to find him.

=== The Festival and its entourage ===
The Festival is an upload civilisation, originally intended to repair galactic information networks, that travels from system to system via starwisps, building the facilities it needs from local materials when it arrives. It usually prefers to interact with other upload civilisations, but any will do in a pinch. It asks for information it is unfamiliar with from those it visits, and will make any kind of payment in exchange.

No individual member of the Festival makes an appearance in the novel. Traveling in the Festival's vast spare mindspace are a number of other upload species that are separate from them but part of every visit.

- The Bouncers: The Festival's brute-force defence, used when "a big stick and a smile were all that was needed." During the novel three automated Bouncer ships take on the Lord Vanek and the rest of the New Republic's naval fleet; one of them is destroyed but the Bouncers' self-replicating robots eat all the opposing ships.
- The Critics: A matriarchal culture that instantiates their physical bodies, which resemble large mole-rats, upon arrival at a new system. Despite their appearance, they are descended from humans and share similar brains. They pay for their passage by providing high-level commentary and analysis of the visited civilisation. During Singularity Sky, one of them, Sister of Stratagems the Seventh, leaves their orbital perch and goes to the planet's surface to better assess whether the Rochardians are truly sapient.
- The Fringe: A subgroup of the Festival that uses the planet as a medium for art. Their projects range from the introduction of extraplanetary flora by the Flower Show to inducing solar flares to create aurora displays. They are considered potentially the Festival's most dangerous element, although this is more from their recklessness than design.
- The Mimes: An offshoot of the Fringe that in the past suffered bit rot from a solar flare and has become corrupted. On a visited planet, the Mimes turn those they encounter into cyborg zombies that attempt to do likewise to others they encounter. It may have been a misguided attempt to communicate.

== Themes ==
The novel's most prominent theme is the cyberpunk refrain that "information wants to be free". Once impediments to it such as the New Republic's methods of repression are removed, technological and material progress follows. Rachel says exactly that to the rescued Vassily as she, he and Martin escape the doomed Lord Vanek.

We've been trying to tell your leaders, in the nicest possible way: information wants to be free. But they wouldn't listen. For forty years we tried. Then along comes the Festival, which treats censorship as a malfunction and routes communications around it. The Festival won't take no for an answer because it doesn't have an opinion on anything; it just is ... [On Earth, w]e had to admit that we couldn't prevent it. Trying to prevent it was worse than the disease itself ... We can live with a low background rate of [the negative consequences] more easily than we can live with total surveillance and total censorship of everything, all the time.

The Festival's function is described as "repair[ing] holes in the galactic information flow".

Singularity Sky also depicts the far-reaching implications of its title event. The arrival of the cornucopia machines and the cybernetic enhancements made available by the Festival force not only the collapse of the existing social, economic and political orders but prevent their replacement by Rubenstein's revolution. "People suddenly gifted with infinite wealth and knowledge rapidly learned that they didn't need a government—and this was true as much for members of the underground as for the workers and peasants they strove to mobilize." Martin describes it to Vassily as "what in our business we call a consensus reality excursion; people went a little crazy, that's all. A sudden overdose of change; immortality, bioengineering, weakly superhuman AI arbeiters, nanotechnology, that sort of thing. It isn't an attack."

== History ==
=== Development ===
Singularity Sky was a younger Stross's first attempt at a novel, and his first novel first published in book form. In the early 1990s, before actively beginning his writing career, Stross had wanted to do space opera, the subgenre of science fiction built around space battles and adventures. As part of his worldbuilding, he needed to have a diverse group of human colonies scattered across a large area of space. He needed to have faster-than-light travel between those worlds, but that also created the problem of avoiding causality violations, one of the many limitations of the singularity for space opera that he credits Vernor Vinge, who wrote an important early essay on the concept, for having highlighted in his novel A Fire Upon the Deep. The Eschaton's dispersal of humanity and subsequent edict were his solution.

"I'd been reading too much David Weber at the time," he recalled in 2013, "and noting the uncritical enthusiasm with which readers seemed to receive his tales of Napoleonic Navies in Spaaaaace." He began to wonder why such space navies always found themselves equally matched in battle. "Surely in a diverse space operatic universe you'll occasionally see a Napoleonic space navy run into a nuclear-powered hunter-killer submarine? Or the equivalent of wooden tall ships encountering an unarmed modern icebreaker." Further, he observed, "[l]et's just say that the political systems in most military space opera really suck."

To satirise these failings of the subgenre, he chose "the most barkingly insane naval expedition of recent history" as a model: the Russian Baltic Fleet's 18,000-mile (29,000 km) journey around Africa and Asia in an attempt to retake Port Arthur in China during the Russo–Japanese War in 1905, with sailors who were largely new recruits and mostly new ships on their shakedown cruise. Most of the Russian fleet of coal-fuelled ships was lost in the resulting Battle of Tsushima, a decisive victory for the Japanese. Their journey to such a crushing defeat, including an early mistaken attack on another polity's civilian vessels similar to the Dogger Bank incident, is closely paralleled by the journey of the New Republic fleet during the novel.

Once he had written that narrative, he realised he had forgotten to give the space navy an enemy. He broached this problem in a conversation at a pub in Edinburgh, where he lives, in August 1997. He recalled his original thoughts about Iain Banks's Excession, and asked for "a threat they don't understand, one that they can't understand." A friend suggested the Edinburgh Festival Fringe, which was the reason they had strayed from their preferred pubs to one in Leith:

Edinburgh in August is a city on the receiving end of an alien invasion spearheaded by unicycling mimes and bagpiping elephants. Add the fleeting twilight nights (we get maybe 4 hours of complete full dark at that time of year) and the pervasive random weirdness—you can go shopping dressed as a Dalek or a 17th-century French aristocrat and nobody will blink at you—and it seemed like the perfect metaphor for what the New Republican Navy was going up against.

With that element in place, Stross cut a large chunk of what he had already written and wrote the novel's opening sequence. Since he had just gotten his own first cellphone, he decided that the Festival would announce its presence to the inhabitants of Rochard's World by raining them from orbit.

He finished the first draft, originally titled Festival of Fools, by 1998, while he was working for DataCash as a software developer and writing the Linux column for Computer Shopper. It ultimately went through three drafts, during which the author says he cut passages equal to about 140% of the finished novel.

After finishing it and the first drafts of a sequel that became Iron Sunrise, Stross was unable to sell it and nearly gave up on writing fiction. He continued trying, especially after leaving his job at DataCash, and finally sold it to Ace Books in 2001. The title was changed to avoid confusion with Richard Paul Russo's Ship of Fools, released around the same time. Stross's editor suggested working "singularity" then a buzzword, into the title.

=== Publication ===
Publication was originally scheduled for mid-2002, but was later postponed until the beginning of the next year under the Big Engine imprint. In the meantime The Atrocity Archive, two long stories Stross had published in the Scottish magazine Spectrum SF, became his first published longform fiction. Big Engine went into liquidation before it could bring out Singularity Sky. Ace published it in the US later that summer, with the mass-market paperback edition coming out a year later, making Singularity Sky Stross's first novel to be published in book form.

Orbit Books acquired the UK rights and published the hardback in 2004 and the paperback early in 2005. Since Iron Sunrise, the sequel, was published within months, an omnibus volume containing both books, Timelike Diplomacy, was published by the SF Book Club in 2004 as well. It has been translated into several other languages, published in ebook format, and remains in print. In 2012 Stross said that the royalties from it amount to $1,000 a year.

== Reception ==
Stross's short stories, particularly those published in Asimov's Science Fiction magazines, later published as Accelerando, had created a great deal of excitement in the science-fiction community. Popular Science ran a feature focusing on him and frequent collaborator Cory Doctorow as newer writers in the genre whose shared background in computer science helped lend credibility to their stories of artificial intelligence and the use of the singularity as a story element. Dealing extensively with both those issues, his first real novel was eagerly anticipated.

It was generally well received. At SF Site Alma Hromic called it "deeply complex in a sort of cerebrally witty way". Reading it was "watching a writer having fun".

At SF Reviews, Thomas Wagner called attention to some of the novel's imperfections. While he praised the scenes showing the effect of the singularity on Rochard's World as "a tour de force of imagination", he felt the characterisation could have been better for the minor characters. Rachel and Martin "get all of Stross's attention ... Other characters are drawn out only as far as the story needs them". "As a newcomer to long fiction," wrote Publishers Weekly, "Stross has some problems with pacing, but the book still generates plenty of excitement."

It was eventually shortlisted for the Hugo Award that year. In 2010 Stross admitted the novel had some faults, calling it "quirky but not well-plotted".

== Analysis ==
Singularity Sky has been the subject of some higher-level literary criticism. Veronica Hollinger of Trent University sees it as an example of what has been called New Baroque Space Opera, along with Iain Banks' Consider Phlebas and Alastair Reynolds' Redemption Ark. "[They] are contributing to a self-conscious revival, in new directions, of one of SF's oldest (and most denigrated) subgenres, constructing futures that—quite cheerfully, for the most part—reflect back to us the incredible complexity of the technoscientific present."

Markus Öhman, an undergraduate education student at Luleå University of Technology in Sweden, has looked at how the novel deals with class and gender issues as they intersect the singularity. Rigid class distinctions, reinforced by a hereditary aristocracy, are a feature of life in the New Republic so marked that both Martin and Rachel express discontent and frustration with them. But outside that order class exists as well. Status among the revolutionaries is measured by one's understanding of, and level of commitment to, revolutionary ideology. And the Critics, in turn, have a hierarchy distinguished by knowledge—Sister Stratagems privately hopes that her oblique manner of speaking and commenting will give enough of an impression of knowledge as to allow her to become queen one day—and gender as well (the only male Critic we see is apparently relegated to a military role and rudely dismissed when he offers even a slight sentence of comment).

The Critics' class-and-gender hierarchy is mirrored by the New Republic, which oppresses women so thoroughly, Öhman observes, that only one female of that society has even a brief real speaking role in the book,(and she is an atypical one at that—the revolutionary confronting Mr. Rabbit). The singularity changes all that, although how is not shown in the text. "Through extrapolation and inference, however, it is made clear that the social upheaval results in changes in the paradigm, ensuing greater freedom for women." So, too, with social class: "... [F]or the duration of the Festival's orbital presence, Rochard's World is a classless anarchistic non-society with small zones of stability filled with modified humans."

Öhman criticises Stross for one aspect of this liberation. He notes that the fugitive Duke describes, among the effects of the singularity, women in villages made so wise that their wisdom "leaked out into the neighborhood, animating the objects around them"—suggestive of witchcraft, which has historically been used to taint women acquiring knowledge as objects to be feared and persecuted. The only significant female character on Rochard's World, Sister Stratagems, is also one of the wisest characters in the story, even if she often speaks too obliquely for her wisdom to have any direct effect. But, Öhman points out, she too is associated with witchcraft in the form of her chosen vehicle, Baba Yaga's walking hut. "Stross uses the symbol of Baba Yaga to imbue Sister Seventh with authority and power, but at the same time he paints her as a symbol of evil and fear."

By contrast, Rachel, according to Öhman, transcends gender limitations. She is both self-empowered, through her military implants and experience, and politically empowered by her position with the UN. During the staged court-martial she appears ready to become another example of a self-empowered woman who voluntarily renounces all or some of her power to save the man she loves, but instead she subverts the trope, drawing on her implants to appropriate the role of a male action hero and rescue Martin. "Through transhumanism, she transcends the tropes associated with male and female literary roles."

== Sequels ==
The novel has a sequel, Iron Sunrise, published in 2004 and shortlisted for that year's Hugo. Stross decided afterwards that he had created unresolvable issues with the Eschaton universe and would not be writing any more works in that series. However, he has shared the plot details of a third novel he had planned, which would have dealt in part with the aftereffects of the events on Rochard's World within the New Republic as a whole.

After finishing Singularity Sky, Stross wrote the first draft of its eventual sequel. Most of it was extensively revised and even more was cut before the version that saw print. It follows Martin and Rachel, now in a long-term relationship, as they try to avert a potentially devastating revenge attack by the remnants of a colony destroyed by an induced supernova, and uncovering a more serious threat in the process. The Eschaton, as Herman, plays a larger direct role in the plot than it does in the first novel. The story is bookended by Rachel having to account to a UN accountant for the expense of her activities in Singularity Sky; otherwise there is no continuation of the narratives of that novel.

In 2010 Stross wrote that mistakes he felt he had made in Iron Sunrise had left the universe of the Eschaton novels "broken" and thus he would not be writing any more novels in the series. However, he did post on his blog the plot setup he had been considering for a third installment before he decided to abandon the setting, which would have revisited the New Republic.

His working title was Space Pirates of KPMG. It would have taken place a decade after Singularity Sky, when the destabilizing effects of the singularity on Rochard's World would have spread to the entirety of the New Republic. As a result of the economic upheavals, the remaining navy crews would be long in arrears on their pay, likely to mutiny and desert for more lucrative opportunities in piracy, using their military skills to violently rob starships of valuable cargo. This would have brought them into conflict with the predominant pirates, who prefer the more discreet technique of auditing the cargo and work with commodities traders to make money through arbitrage on the destination planet.

== Legacy ==
Singularity Sky has been cited outside the science fiction audience by writers trying to explain to readers the title concept, or at least the effects of the rapid change the novel depicts in a real-world context. In his 2011 book News 2.0: Can Journalism Survive the Internet, Australian journalism professor Martin Hirst sees Rubenstein, whom the novel describes as a journalist, as an analogue to the position of real journalists confronted by the evolution of the Internet and social media in the early 21st century. While he concedes that there are experts who are sceptical that computers will reach or surpass human intelligence by the 2030s, "the point here is that Stross is right enough ... The world appears to be on a path of technological change that is constant and speeding up."

In 2010 David Betz, a senior lecturer in war studies at King's College, London, cited Singularity Sky as a model for a proposal to undermine the Taliban's hold over Afghanistan, and strengthen the country's legitimate government, by giving every resident of the country a free mobile phone. He said it would "create a real communications space and 'let ideas find their own levels'". In Stross's novel, he noted, "the contact of the lesser developed culture with the advanced one is utterly devastating for the status quo of the former. The parallels are pretty obvious."
