= Jack Carr (writer) =

American author (born 1975)

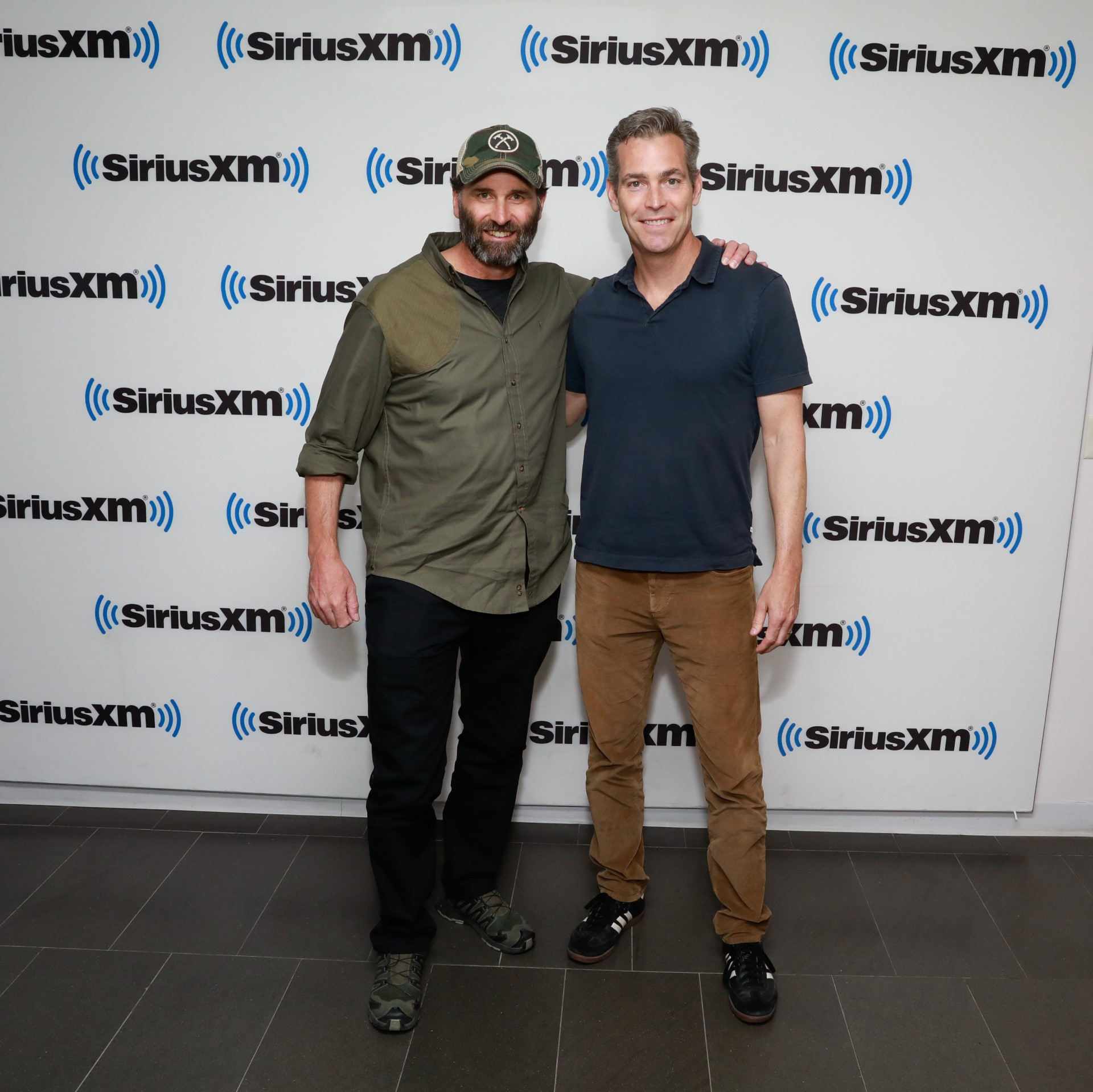
- Carr (left) with author Doug Brunt at the SiriusXM studios in 2023
- Born: July 3, 1975 (age 51); Minnesota, U.S.
- Children: 3
- Military career
- Allegiance: United States
- Branch: United States Navy
- Service years: 1996–2016
- Rank: Commander
- Unit: United States Navy SEALs
- Known for: The Terminal List series
- Conflicts: War on terrorism; Iraq War; War in Afghanistan
- Awards: Bronze Star Medal with V Device (2)
- Website: www.officialjackcarr.com

George Petersen (born 3 July 1975), better known by his pen name Jack Carr, is an American novelist, screenwriter, producer, podcaster, and former Navy SEAL sniper. He is the #1 New York Times bestselling author of the James Reece series. His books now include non-fiction with the release of Targeted: Beirut and a new co-written thriller series with M.P. Woodward titled The Fourth Option. The Terminal List, the first novel in the James Reece series, is now an #1 Amazon hit television series starring Chris Pratt, which has been expanded into a second season and a spin-off show starring Taylor Kitsch.

== Biography ==
=== Early life and personal information ===
George Petersen was born into a military family and his mother was a librarian which gave him access to many books. He developed interests in authors such as David Morrell, Tom Clancy, Ian Fleming, Nelson DeMille and Louis L'Amour. When Petersen first learned about the United States Navy SEALs at the age of 7, he decided that that was the career he was going to pursue.

Petersen joined the U.S. Navy in 1996. He spent over 20 years in Naval Special Warfare Command.

Petersen presently lives in Park City, Utah, with his wife and children. He also hosts a podcast called "Danger Close".

=== Writing ===
Petersen's first novel, The Terminal List, was published in 2018 by Simon & Schuster / Atria / Emily Bestler Books. The Terminal List was followed by True Believer, Savage Son, The Devil's Hand, In the Blood, Only the Dead, Red Sky Mourning, and Cry Havoc. Petersen's novels feature a former Navy SEAL sniper named James Reece who becomes embroiled in the world of conspiracies, international espionage, and revenge. The first few Terminal List books - The Terminal List, True Believer, Savage Son, and The Devil's Hand - were co-written by Peterson and Keith Wood, though subsequent books were written exclusively by Petersen.

In 2025, Carr expanded the Terminal List series with a prequel novel titled Cry Havoc. Cry Havoc is set in 1968 and is centered on James Reece's father, Navy SEAL Tom Reece, during the Vietnam War while attached to MACV-SOG. All Petersen's novels have been New York Times bestsellers. All Petersen's audio books are read by Ray Porter and have been New York Times Audiobook bestsellers. The first in a new thriller series titled The Fourth Option, co-written with M.P. Woodward, will publish in 2026.

==== Non-fiction ====
In March 2023 it was announced that Petersen had signed a deal with Simon & Schuster / Atria / Emily Bestler Books for a series of terrorism focused non-fiction books. Targeted: The 1983 Beirut Barracks Bombing is the first in a series of books exploring seminal terrorist events written by Petersen and Pulitzer Prize finalist James M. Scott.

=== Podcasts ===
==== Danger Close: Beyond the Books with Jack Carr ====
Petersen's podcast, Danger Close: Beyond the Book with Jack Carr, debuted in March 2021. Petersen explores topics in long form conversation with special operations veterans, tacticians, strategists, historians, newsmakers, entrepreneurs, thought leaders, geopolitical analysts, intelligence professionals, and authors.

==== The Terminal List Podcast ====
Petersen's The Terminal List Podcast debuted in July 2022. Petersen, showrunner David DiGilio, and actor/producer/technical advisor and former Navy SEAL Jared Shaw break down each individual episode of the Amazon Prime Video series and share behind the scenes stories and insights from development through production. Chris Pratt anchors the final episode. The Terminal List Podcast debuted at number three in the TV & Film category on the Apple Podcasts charts.

== Television ==
=== Screenwriting ===
Petersen served as executive producer for the Amazon Studios adaptation of The Terminal List starring Chris Pratt. The series premiered on July 1, 2022 and was Amazon's #1 streaming series with 1.6 billion minutes of viewing its first week. Petersen made a cameo appearance as an assassin in episode three.

In January 2023, it was announced that Petersen and The Terminal List showrunner David DiGilio would co-create a spin-off origin story series based on character Ben Edwards, portrayed by Taylor Kitsch, from The Terminal List for Amazon Studios with Petersen as executive producer and writer. The Terminal List: Dark Wolf premiered on August 27, 2025 and was a #1 Prime Video series. Petersen made cameo appearances in episodes four and seven.

In January 2023, it was announced that Chris Pratt would reprise his role as James Reece in a second season of The Terminal List titled The Terminal List: True Believer with Petersen as executive producer and writer. Filming wrapped in October 2025.

=== Adaptations ===
The Terminal List was adapted for an eight-part series for Amazon Prime Video starring Chris Pratt in 2022.

The second season of The Terminal List starring Chris Pratt, based on Petersen's True Believer, is set to premier on October 21, 2026.

== Military career ==
Petersen led special operations teams as a Team Leader, Platoon Commander, Troop Commander, and Task Unit Commander. He served as an enlisted SEAL sniper before being selected for Navy Officer Candidate School. He then led assault and sniper teams in Iraq and Afghanistan as a junior officer, practiced counterinsurgency in the southern Philippines as a platoon commander, and commanded a Special Operations Task Unit in the most Iranian influenced section of southern Iraq throughout the drawdown of U.S. Forces. He retired in June 2016 after 20 years of service.

== Awards and honors ==
Awards for Carr's writing
Year	Title	Award	Result	Ref.
2018	The Terminal List	Goodreads Choice Award for Debut Author	Nominee	
2019	The Terminal List	Thriller Award for Best First Novel	Finalist	
2019	The Terminal List	Barry Award for Best Thriller	Finalist	
2019	The Terminal List	Audie Award for Thriller/Suspense	Finalist	
2020	True Believer	Barry Award for Best Thriller	Finalist	
2022	The Devil's Hand	Barry Award for Best Thriller	Finalist	
2023	In the Blood	Barry Award for Best Thriller	Finalist	

== Bibliography ==
=== The Terminal List series ===
==== James Reece series ====
	Title	Publication Date	ISBN
1	The Terminal List	March 6, 2018	1501180819
2	True Believer	July 30, 2019	1501180843
3	Savage Son	April 14, 2020	1982123702
4	The Devil's Hand	April 13, 2021	1982123745
5	In the Blood	May 17, 2022	1982181656
6	Only the Dead	May 16, 2023	1982181699
7	Red Sky Mourning	June 18, 2024	1668047071
8	State of Exile	October 5, 2027	1398530225

==== Tom Reece series ====
1. Cry Havoc (2025)

=== Targeted series (non-fiction) ===
1. Targeted: Beirut (2024)

=== Standalone ===
1. The Fourth Option (with M. P. Woodward) (2026)

== See also ==
- List of United States Navy SEALs
