= Cry Havoc (novel) =

2025 novel by Jack Carr

- Hardcover edition
- Author: Jack Carr
- Language: English
- Series: Tom Reece
- Release number: 1
- Genre: Thriller
- Publisher: Atria/Emily Bestler Books
- Publication date: October 7, 2025
- Publication place: United States
- Media type: Print (hardback & paperback)
- Pages: 544
- ISBN: 978-1-6680-9525-6

Cry Havoc is a thriller novel written by Jack Carr. It introduces, Tom Reece, a Navy SEAL operator serving with MACV-SOG during the Vietnam War in 1968.

The book was released on October 7, 2025, by Atria/Emily Bestler Books.

== Plot ==
In May 1968, U.S. Navy SEAL Thomas Reece joins Recon Team Havoc on a wiretap mission along Laos's Ho Chi Minh trail. Quinn commands, with interpreter Hiep. A North Vietnamese squad spots them. Tom detonates claymore mines. Montagnard fighter Sau is wounded. Their helicopter pickup comes under fire. Tom's gear snags branches during a second attempt by ropes. He sees Quinn's helicopter shot down, cuts his rope, and drops into jungle growth, believing Quinn may live.

Four months earlier, USS Pueblo commander Lloyd "Pete" Bucher gathers signals off North Korea. North Korean vessels and MiGs attack; Bucher surrenders. In Moscow, GRU director Mikhail Lavrinenko tells cryptologist Sergei Egorov that captured Pueblo equipment needs codes. Warrant officer John Walker and NSA employee Allister Desmond supply them. Stasi agent Clara Müller manages Desmond, who copies codes. Lavrinenko sends Müller for codes.

Back in Vietnam, Tom, Quinn, and Montagnard leader Amiuh raid near Phu Bai and capture an NVA courier. Lieutenant Colonel Konrad Backhaus approves the mission and orders them to escort the captive to Da Nang. Amiuh treasures a Croix de Lorraine rosary. GRU Major Kirill Dvornikov proposes seizing MACV-SOG teams in Laos and secretly transporting captured Americans to Soviet territory. Lavrinenko approves, releasing Spetsnaz fighter Adrik Voronin from a Hanoi prison.

In Da Nang, Tom and Quinn hear their captive repeat "Crack the Sky, Shake the Earth." Dvornikov fears he knows Tet Offensive plans and arranges a Saigon convoy ambush. ARVN Captain Lam executes the prisoner. Tom and Quinn kill Lam, but Amiuh dies helping them escape. Colonel Singlaub introduces CIA officer Nick Serrano, an associate of Tom's father. The captive carried Tet maps. Tom meets Ella DuBois. During Tet, Serrano sends Tom and Quinn to rescue Ella and her father from Saigon's Majestic Hotel.

Back in May, Tom finds Quinn and Hiep at an NVA depot. Voronin tortures Quinn, forcing Tom to flee. Tom returns with a captured antiaircraft gun, wrecks vehicles and fuel stores, then escapes down the Sepon River. The depot is empty when a rescue team arrives. Quinn's mutilated body hangs from a tree, Amiuh's rosary pinned there by Quinn's tomahawk.

By July, Serrano says a GRU network may be moving U.S. prisoners to Siberia. Tom joins the CIA and persuades Ella that GRU agents killed her father. In Bangkok, Voronin kills Ella before she can drug Dvornikov. Tom and Serrano chase them by longtail boat. Tom captures Dvornikov and kills Voronin. Dvornikov confesses the prisoner-transfer scheme.

Serrano says Washington will trade Dvornikov for Pueblo's crew and conceals the Siberia prisoners. On New Year's Eve, Tom enters East Berlin and kills Dvornikov. He returns to Vietnam to join Serrano's Phoenix Program, search for American prisoners, and find Amiuh's son.

== Release ==
Cry Havoc is scheduled to be released and publishing date by Atria/Emily Bestler Books in the United States on October 7, 2025. It was previously scheduled for June 10, 2025.

== Reception ==
Cry Havoc received positive reviews from critics. Ryan Steck of The Real Book Spy praised the novel's blend of military thriller, historical fiction, and espionage, calling it "the best book of the year" and commending Carr's intensity, authenticity, and emotional depth. Kirkus Reviews awarded the novel a starred review, describing it as "Powerful, violent, and engrossing" and highlighting its portrayal of covert operations during the Vietnam War. The publisher, Simon & Schuster, also featured praise from BookTrib, which called it Carr's most ambitious and best-realized book to date.
