= At the End of Every Day =

2023 novel by Arianna Reiche

- Author: Arianna Reiche
- Publisher: Atria Books
- Publication date: 2023

At the End of Every Day is a novel by Arianna Reiche. It was published by Atria Books in 2023.

== Plot summary ==
Delphi Baxter is an amusement park worker who was left scarred after a childhood accident. Her boyfriend Brendan is a prince mascot at the park. When an actress dies at the amusement park, it is announced that the park will close. Delphi has increasingly surreal experiences as the park slowly winds down its operations and begins to doubt her reality.

== Structure and style ==
The book incorporates horror and surreal elements, and was inspired by "the psychology of theme parks and animatronics." The primary plot is interwoven with epistolary chapters describing a pair of siblings' relationship to each other and the amusement park.

== Reception ==
The book received praise for its prose and uncanny atmosphere, but was criticized for having a confusing plot and being difficult for readers to connect with.
