= Iron Sunrise =

2004 book by Charles Stross

- Cover of first edition (hardcover)
- Author: Charles Stross
- Language: English
- Genre: Science fiction
- Publisher: Ace Books
- Publication date: 2004
- Publication place: United Kingdom
- Media type: Print (hardback & paperback)
- Pages: 355
- ISBN: 0-441-01159-4
- OCLC: 54006981
- Dewey Decimal: 813/.6 22
- LC Class: PR6119.T79 I76 2004
- Preceded by: Singularity Sky

Iron Sunrise is a 2004 hard science fiction novel by British writer Charles Stross, which follows the events in Singularity Sky. The book was nominated for both the Hugo and Locus Awards in 2005.

Singularity Sky depicts a future where human societies have been involuntarily taken from Earth and widely distributed across the Milky Way galaxy, seemingly at random, in the wake of a technological singularity which has led to the onset of strong AI, in the form of the Eschaton.

The events in both novels take place consecutively some time after the immediate aftermath of the singularity.

== Plot summary ==
Martin Springfield and Rachel Mansour return to Earth to recuperate following the events of Singularity Sky. However, Rachel is quickly called upon to explain the administrative expenses she incurred during her previous assignment. Shortly thereafter she finds herself negotiating with a lunatic believing himself to be a reincarnation of Idi Amin and in possession of an armed nuclear device which, in the black humor typical of the series, he has threatened to detonate after receiving an eviction notice from his apartment.

Meanwhile, a young and hopeful planetary civilization is murdered by the apparent use of a causality violation device which causes their sun to explode without warning (the "iron sunrise" of the title), and their defense systems to deploy automatically against the homeworld of the suspected perpetrators of the atrocity.

Rachel and Martin set off to investigate these events and prevent the assassination of the remaining members of the murdered civilization's leaders, who can abort the retaliation strike. In the background the Eschaton continues to play its own game.
