= 37 INK =

Imprint of Simon & Schuster

- Parent company: Simon & Schuster
- Founded: 2013
- Country of origin: United States
- Headquarters location: New York City
- Publication types: Books
- Owner: Kohlberg Kravis Roberts
- Official website: 37 INK

37 INK is an American publisher launched in 2013 focusing on a diverse list including African American authors. It is an imprint of Simon & Schuster's Atria Publishing Group.

Dawn Davis, the former publisher at Amistad Press, is the current publisher for 37 INK.

37 INK officially launched in 2013. Dawn Davis said that the imprint name comes from the 37th parallel north which intersects California, Africa, and Italy—three places that have been significant to Davis. In an interview, Davis said that her mother was from Italy, she was from California and Africa is where we are all from. Davis stated to Publishers Weekly that the title is also "reflective of the breadth of voices and viewpoints that the imprint will publish."

Upon its launch, the imprint was expected to publish ten titles per year spread across literary fiction, memoir, narrative non-fiction, history and pop culture books. While the imprint has published many titles by African-American authors, Davis stated in an interview on NPR that 37 Ink "wants to publish books that represent a diverse array of cultures and viewpoints because that is what readers want."

== Notable authors ==
Simon & Schuster has published thousands of books from thousands of authors. This list represents some of the more notable authors who have published at 37 INK. For a more extensive list see List of Simon & Schuster authors.

- Issa Rae
- Kevin Hart
- JJ Smith
- Pat Cleveland
- Taraji P. Henson
- Michael Strahan
