= Deep Cover =

Deep Cover may refer to:

- Deep cover, or non-official cover, in intelligence gathering
- Deep Cover (1992 film), an American crime film starring Laurence Fishburne
  - Deep Cover (soundtrack), the 1992 film's soundtrack album
  - "Deep Cover" (song), the film's theme song, performed by Dr. Dre and Snoop Dogg
- Deep Cover (2025 film), a British action comedy film about improv actors going undercover for the police
- Blade on the Feather, a 1980 British TV film, released in the U.S. on VHS as Deep Cover
- Deep cover, a fielding position in the sport of cricket
