= The Terminal List =

American action thriller television series

- Promotional poster
- Genre: Action; Conspiracy thriller; Drama
- Created by: David DiGilio
- Based on: The Terminal List by Jack Carr
- Showrunner: David DiGilio
- Starring: Chris Pratt; Constance Wu; Taylor Kitsch; Riley Keough; Arlo Mertz; Jeanne Tripplehorn; Tom Hopper
- Composer: Ruth Barrett
- Country of origin: United States
- Original language: English
- No. of seasons: 2
- No. of episodes: 16

Production
- Executive producers: Chris Pratt; David DiGilio; Antoine Fuqua; Jack Carr; Jon Schumacher; Daniel Shattuck; David Auge; Kat Samick; Max Adams; Jared Shaw
- Producer: Ronald Cosmo Vecchiarelli
- Cinematography: Armando Salas; Evans Brown
- Running time: 46–67 minutes
- Production companies: Amazon MGM Studios; Indivisible Productions; Fuqua Films; DiGilio Films; Civic Center Media; MRC Television

Original release
- Network: Amazon Prime Video
- Release: July 1, 2022 – present

Related
- The Terminal List: Dark Wolf

The Terminal List is an American action thriller television series created by David DiGilio for Amazon Prime Video. It is based on the 2018 novel of the same name by Jack Carr. The series tells the story of a Navy SEAL who seeks to avenge the murder of his family. It stars Chris Pratt, Constance Wu, Taylor Kitsch, Riley Keough, Arlo Mertz, Jeanne Tripplehorn, and Tom Hopper.

The first season of The Terminal List was released on July 1, 2022. A prequel series titled The Terminal List: Dark Wolf premiered in 2025. In February 2023, the series was renewed for a second season based upon the follow-up novel, True Believer, which premiered on October 21, 2026.

== Premise ==
After his platoon of US Navy SEALs is ambushed while on a covert mission, Lieutenant Commander Reece returns home to his family with conflicting memories of the event and questions about his culpability. As new evidence emerges, Reece discovers dark forces working against him, endangering not only his life but also the lives of those he loves.

== Cast and characters ==
=== Main ===
- Chris Pratt as Lieutenant Commander James Reece, a US Navy SEAL with eight combat deployments, and the Troop Commander of Alpha Platoon, SEAL Team 7, and Task Force Odin's Sword.
- Constance Wu as Katie Buranek, a seasoned war correspondent for Voltstreem News
- Taylor Kitsch as Ben Edwards (season 1; guest season 2), a CIA Ground Branch operative, who is a former Navy SEAL and James Reece's former teammate and BUD/S classmate.
- Riley Keough as Lauren Reece (season 1), James' wife
- Arlo Mertz as Lucy Reece (season 1), James and Lauren's daughter
- Jeanne Tripplehorn as Lorraine Hartley (season 1), US Secretary of Defense
- Tom Hopper as Raife Hastings (season 2), former US Navy SEAL Lieutenant and Reece's friend, who has family ancestry rooted in Rhodesia, with familial historical connections to the Rhodesian military, particularly the Selous Scouts.

=== Recurring ===
- Nick Chinlund as Rear Admiral Gerald Pillar (season 1), Commander of WARCOM
- Matthew Rauch as Captain Leonard Howard (season 1), Judge Advocate General of WARCOM
- LaMonica Garrett as Commander William "Bill" Cox (season 1), Commander of SEAL Team 7
- Patrick Schwarzenegger as Special Warfare Operator Second Class Donald "Donny" Mitchell (season 1), Alpha Platoon's youngest member
- Jared Shaw as Chief Special Warfare Operator Ernest "Boozer" Vickers (season 1; guest season 2), a member of Alpha Platoon
- Tyner Rushing as Liz Riley (season 1), a private airline pilot and former U.S. Army Aviation Branch Warrant Officer, who was rescued in 2007 by Reece's team when her Kiowa was shot down in Iraq and was Lucy's God-Mother.
- Arturo Castro as Jordan Groff (season 1; guest season 2), Katie's editor at Voltstream News
- Jai Courtney as Steve Horn (season 1), CEO and President of Capstone Industries
- Paul McCrane as Dr. Mike Tedesco (season 1), CEO of Nubellum, a pharmaceutical subsidiary of Capstone Industries
- Stephen Bishop as Richard Fontana (season 1), a Department of Defense official and Hartley's underling
- J. D. Pardo as Tony Layun (season 1), an FBI special agent and head of the Fugitive Task Force for the San Diego field office
- Christina Vidal as Mackenzie 'Mac' Wilson (season 1), a deputy U.S. Marshal and Layun's partner on the Fugitive Task Force
- Drew Starkey as Junior Alba (season 1), a SDPD detective and Layun's subordinate on the Fugitive Task Force
- Alexis Louder as Nicole Deptula (season 1), an FBI special agent and Layun's subordinate on the Fugitive Task Force
- Hiram A. Murray as Jackson (season 1), a security contractor at Steve Horn's Talos Tactical
- Shadi Janho as Amin Al-Nawaz (season 2), an Egyptian terrorist and the new leader of a resurgent Al-Qaeda
- Gabriel Luna as Fredrick Alfred "Freddy" Strain (season 2), a CIA/SAC Ground Branch officer, a skilled sniper and former DEVGRU Senior Chief
- Dar Salim as Mohammed "Mo" Farooq (season 2), former Major in ISOF and CIA Contractor
- Olga Kurylenko as Yana Tomenko (season 2), Adrenov's Chief of Staff
- Yul Vazquez as Vic Rodriguez (season 2), a CIA case officer, head of Ground Branch and a former Green Beret.
- Martin Sensmeier as Sergeant Major Jeff Otaktay (season 2), Raife's friend in the Defense Logistics Agency
- Costa Ronin as Vasili Andrenov (season 2), a Russian-Ukrainian billionaire media mogul
- Edwin Hodge as Eli Bowman (season 2), a CIA/SAC Contractor and Ground Branch operator
- Keith Jardine as Rick "Ox" Andrews (season 2), a CIA/SAC Contractor and Ground Branch operator
- Jeremy Bobb as Oliver Grey (season 2), a CIA accountant
- Luke Hemsworth as Jules Landry (season 2), former CIA Officer and later Contractor

=== Guest ===
- Warren Kole as Josh Holder (season 1), an NCIS special agent
- Justin Garza as Special Warfare Operator First Class Victor Ramirez (season 1), a member of Alpha Platoon
- Ajay James as Senior Chief Special Warfare Operator Cortese (season 1), Alpha Platoon's Chief, tactical team leader, and advisor to LCDR James Reece.
- Tom Amandes as Vic Campbell (season 1), Lauren Reece's father
- Catherine Dyer as Rachel Campbell (season 1), Lauren Reece's mother
- Marco Rodríguez as Marco Del Toro (season 1), a Mexican businessman and family friend of the Reeces
- Sean Gunn as Saul Agnon (season 1), Vice President of Capstone Industries
- Carsten Norgaard as Elias Ryberg (season 1), a prospective buyer of Nubellum Pharmaceuticals
- Geoff Pierson as Senator Joe Pryor (season 1), member of Senate Appropriations Subcommittee on Defense
- Patricia de Leon as Paola Del Toro (season 1), Marco's wife
- Renata Friedman as Anne Howard (season 1), Captain Howard's wife
- Jack Yang as Brian Buranek (season 1), Katie's brother
- Nicole Steinwedell as Deborah Buranek (season 1), Katie's sister-in-law
- Nate Boyer as Luke Malick (season 1), FBI HRT team leader
- Remi Adeleke as Terrell "Tee" Daniels (season 1), FBI HRT operator
- Derek Phillips as Stephen Ramsay (season 1), an FBI senior special agent
- Butch Klein as Marcus Boykin (season 1), a lawyer and Saul Agnon's associate
- Jack Carr as Adrian Gordonis (season 1; cameo), a Marine Raider veteran and security contractor at Talos Tacticals. Jack Carr is The Terminal List's author and executive producer, as well as a former Navy SEAL officer.
- Arnold Vosloo as Richard "Rich" Hastings (season 2), Raife's uncle
- Robert Wisdom as Jed Haverford (season 2), an imprisoned former CIA spymaster
- Shiraz Tzarfati as Tal Varon (season 2), a former Mossad surveillance operative
- Caitlin Bassett as Special Agent Kim Scheer (season 2), US Secret Service
- Alexander Siddig as Maajid Kifayat (season 2), a cultural guide working for the CIA
- Valentina Shevchenko as Agent Kira Kotova (season 2)

== Episodes ==
Season	Episodes	Originally released
1	8	July 1, 2022
2	8	October 21, 2026

=== Season 1 (2022) ===
No. overall	No. in season	Title	Directed by	Teleplay by	Original release date
1	1	"The Engram"	Antoine Fuqua	David DiGilio	July 1, 2022
Navy SEAL Lieutenant Commander James Reece and his platoon of fourteen SEALs, along with a Syrian Democratic Forces informant, conduct a mission to move in on Dr. Kahani, a chemical weapons expert, in Syria. However, they are ambushed and the whole team dies, save for Reece and his friend, Ernest 'Boozer' Vickers. The Naval Criminal Investigative Service (NCIS) interviews Reece about the mission and question several of his recollections. After he is medically cleared, he and Boozer fly home. Reece relays his account of the mission to his best friend, CIA officer and former SEAL Ben Edwards, who seems dismissive of any foul play. Reece arrives home to his wife and daughter, Lauren and Lucy, but they notice his memory loss. The following day, Boozer is found dead in his home, apparently by suicide. When Reece begins to have headaches, he goes to a nearby clinic late at night for an MRI, but is attacked with his own gun that he locked in a safe at home, before finding Lauren and Lucy dead.
2	2	"Encoding"	Ellen Kuras	David DiGilio	July 1, 2022
Reece mourns Lauren and Lucy's passing, accompanied by his friend from Mexico, Marco del Toro, and another friend, former army pilot Elizabeth 'Liz' Riley. When investigative journalist Katie Buranek tells him that NCIS Agent Josh Holder, the man handling his case, finds no evidence to prove Reece's innocence in the death of his family, Reece takes measures to be careful. He also theorizes that Holder could have been involved in, if not responsible for the death of Lauren and Lucy. He takes a drawing of Lucy's, portraying his family, and writes Holder's name on the back, starting his 'terminal list'. He then surveils Holder before working with Edwards to get information from Holder's computer files. Secretary of Defense Lorraine Hartley meets with Reece in a bar, assuring him that Kahani was killed in another mission. Reece now has no leads, but Edwards tells him that Holder pulled his biometrics, implying that Reece's suspicions were probably correct. Reece then sneaks into Holder's apartment and kills him in his bed after Holder admits he had been bribed by a Capstone Industries vice president to close the investigation.
3	3	"Consolidation"	M. J. Bassett	Daniel Shattuck	July 1, 2022
With the second name to add to the terminal list, Capstone Industries Vice President Saul Agnon, Reece meets Buranek to tell her of his suspicions. However, Buranek is dismissive, telling Reece that the clinic he went to had discovered a tumor in his head. He then notices an operator (later identified as Adrian Gordonis) has been following him, and he outsmarts his would-be assassin before killing him and escaping. Buranek is now convinced that Reece isn't entirely crazy, promising to find any connection to his mission and Capstone if there is one. In the meantime, Capstone CEO Steve Horn is training with his bodyguards from Talos Security during lunch. When he gets back to the office, Agnon discloses Gordonis' failed mission. Reece fills Edwards in on Agnon, and his friend goes to study their new target in a golf tournament, where Agnon meets Dr Mike Tedesco, CEO of Nubellum Pharmaceuticals. After Agnon attends and disbands a party in his home, Reece sneaks in and interrogates him, learning about Horn, a project called RD4895, and a lawyer called Marcus Boykin who hired sicarios to kill Reece's family. With two new names to add to his list, Reece poisons Agnon.
4	4	"Detachment"	Frederick E. O. Toye	John Lopez	July 1, 2022
Reece treks up a mountain in Wyoming Backcounty to set up a sniper shot, killing Boykin in his car and copying data from his phone to send to Edwards. San Diego's FBI branch is tasked with capturing Reece, leading Tony Layun, Mackenzie 'Mac' Wilson, Junior Alba and Nicole Deptula to find Katie hidden in her brother Brian's beach house. They try to interrogate her, but she remains stubborn, fearful that she can't trust anyone. She also theorizes that Reece's deceased platoon may have also had tumors. Edwards tracks the Sicario group responsible for the death of Reece's family. Edwards tries to reason with him before the group then learn about Reece's tumor. He gets medicine to control the symptoms but still wants to go through with the mission to kill the fifth name on the list, Navajas. After successfully killing Navajas' crew, Reece subdues the man, disembowels him, and leaves him to die.
5	5	"Disruption"	Tucker Gates	Olu Odebunmi & Tolu Awosika	July 1, 2022
Reece and Riley are using a hangar to plan a capture mission for Horn. The easiest way would be to break through the FBI, who Reece has discovered is onto him and Buranek, in the middle of the financial district. Buranek confronts Tedesco about RD4895, who theorizes that this could be why Horn wants to sell his company. He then gives information about RD4895 to Buranek, explaining that it's an experimental drug that was supposed to solve PTSD by stopping the encoding of traumatic memories on the brain. However, Horn suddenly stopped the project, making him theorize that the Capstone CEO illegally tested it on Reece's troop. Horn, aware of Tedesco's snooping, sends Talos agents to kill both Tedesco and Buranek. Tedesco dies, but Buranek survives after killing one before being saved by Reece, who she tells her findings to. Reece also learns that there were shell company owners who were involved, and when Buranek tries to withhold the information to prevent him from killing more people, Reece steals it before threatening her. The following day, he learns from Edwards, who he shares the info with, that his Admiral, Gerald Pillar, his captain, Leonard Howard, and his commander, Bill Cox, were also involved. Reece, angry and betrayed, creates an explosively formed projectile and uses it to ambush Horn at Capstone Industries, endangering many lives, including Buranek's, but leaves no civilian casualties while killing Horn and his bodyguards before running.
6	6	"Transience"	Sylvain White	Max Adams	July 1, 2022
Two weeks earlier, Reece had visited his parents in law about seeking revenge for their daughter and granddaughter. Riley starts worrying about Reece's mental state, but Edwards assures her that he'll be fine. The FBI deploy all available tactical personnel to deal with Reece, but his training and his headstart help him maintain distance. Reece reminisces over a training session by the beach, where his memory confusion leads him to think about how he was betrayed. Reece manages to steal a bag of explosives from the FBI, sparing Layun's life after having a headshot on him, but threatens Layun to stay out of his way. The FBI continues chasing him anyway and manage to catch him, but he's planted explosives for an ambush. After threatening Wilson, who refuses to listen to his demands, he causes a mudslide, burying them both. He makes it out and saves Wilson from being buried alive before he escapes. He apologizes to Riley for his behavior, who now encourages him to keep going. Then he meets Edwards at a beach in California before they plan their next series of missions.
7	7	"Extinction"	Frederick E. O. Toye	Brooke Roberts	July 1, 2022
SECDEF Lorraine Hartley classifies Reece as a domestic terrorist and the San Diego's branch of the FBI begins to get desperate. However, a fearful Buranek gives them the lead they need to find out Reece's motives. They get access to a capitalization table, an accounting record of everyone who made money from the successful Nubellum sale. They discover the shell companies involved, and learn that Pillar, Howard and Cox are Reece's next targets, setting a new plan in motion to capture him. Meanwhile, Reece and Edwards are forming a plan of their own to kill all three. Reece creates a suicide vest, lined with two claymore mines for one of his targets. Pillar realizes that Hartley is conducting a sham investigation on him to cover herself, but defends his position about the mission that killed Reece's dead troop. When he tries to reach Howard for more legal trump cards, Howard tries to run, but is kidnapped by Edwards, along with his wife Ann and son TJ. Reece finds Cox outside a bar, subdues him, and interrogates him for more information before drowning him in the Pacific Ocean. Reece then threatens Howard with his family, telling him that either he dies alone or they die too. Howard does as he's told, wearing the suicide vest and getting blown up alongside Pillar, who first tries to beg Reece for his life. Layun learns that the Department of Defense, and in turn, Hartley, authorized RD4895, making the experiment legal despite no approval from the FDA, and discloses this to Buranek, who plans on releasing a story surrounding this revelation. Reece escapes from Layun who tries to capture him again. Buranek attempts to send the story to her publisher, however her email does not go through. Just then, Lorraine Hartley finds Buranek, telling her the story is only half true, before offering Buranek an offer to interview her.
8	8	"Reclamation"	Sylvain White	Lisa Long & Hennah Sekander	July 1, 2022
After learning that Hartley ordered the ambush mission, and approved of RD4895, Reece has the ninth name to add to his list, travelling with Edwards to get to her. Before publishing the story, Buranek holds one more interview with Hartley. During the interview, Buranek manages to get Hartley to admit that she knew the SEALS had tumors, and that she let them be killed during the mission in Syria, thus proving her culpability. They make it through the LA branch of the FBI, who've taken the case from the San Diego Branch. Layun and Wilson, still looking to even the score with Reece, get HRT to work with them to capture Reece and Hartley so both can face justice. Reece's last remaining friend, a Rhodesian SEAL teammate named Raife Hastings, supplies Reece with a boat and some gear, leaving a note telling him that he's repaid a favor he previously owed, and that they're now even. Reece and Edwards then kill many Talos operatives, who Hartley hired after dumping CID to kill Reece for her own agenda, before Reece enters her mansion and kills his way to her saferoom. Buranek begs Reece to spare Hartley, but he's too hungry for revenge. Hartley commits suicide, and Reece leaves after Layun, who knows that Reece was betrayed, wrongfully pursued, and practically dead, lets him go. Unfortunately for Reece, he discovers that there's a tenth name to add to his list, and with Buranek's help, he's heartbroken to discover that it's Edwards, who admits to being involved in the mission, but tearfully denies being involved in Lauren and Lucy's deaths, claiming that he helped Reece out of repentance. Edwards then lets Reece kill him. Reece then thinks back to a moment when he and his family had a heart to heart conversation about his possible death, a flashback that was confused multiple times before, but he now remembers clearly. He then remorselessly looks at the terminal list one last time, before turning it around to see Lucy's family drawing, mourning his losses once more. He commits the drawing to heart and memory before letting the wind blow it into the ocean, setting sail for Mozambique.

=== Season 2 (2026) ===
No. overall	No. in season	Title	Directed by	Teleplay by	Original release date
9	1	"Romulus S.V."	Paul Cameron	David DiGilio & Jack Carr	October 21, 2026
Eight months later, Reece is a fugitive on the FBI Most Wanted List and subject to negative public opinion. He remains at sea, suffering from worsening hallucinations and contemplating suicide. Capstone is ordered to pay $380 million in restitution to Alpha Platoon's families. Hartley's estate insist she was shot by Reece, and sue Buranek for defamation for reporting her suicide. Voltstreem is considered for purchase by Vasili Andrenov, a Russian-Ukrainian oligarch and media mogul attempting to broker peace in the war. In London, a resurgent and technology focused Al-Qaeda led by Amin Al-Nawaz attacks a Christmas market, killing 113. Buranek meets Andrenov at a summit in Brussels and questions why the Russian government has not killed him. He tells her he is buying Voltstreem because of her tenacity, wanting her to investigate forces beyond the Kremlin who want the war to continue. Andrenov's motorcade is attacked by a drone piloted by Al-Qaeda lieutenant Mohammed "Mo" Farooq, (Note: A former Iraqi ISOF Major last seen working as a CIA contractor in 2015 alongside Reece and Edwards in The Terminal List: Dark Wolf) killing the NATO SACEUR. Reece arrives at a game reserve owned by Raife's uncle Rich Hastings in Niassa. Vic Rodriguez, the head of CIA Ground Branch, urges his superiors to help him locate Reece, believing he is alive and that his history with Farooq can help them track him down.
10	2	"Warrior in a Garden"	Paul Cameron	Max Adams	October 21, 2026
Reece uses his skills to help Rich and his staff deal with poachers. Raife, now working in the arms industry, discovers a drone his company Trident True sold to Ukraine was redirected to Al-Qaeda and used in the Brussels attack. With help from his friend Jeff Otaktay, a SGM in the Defense Logistics Agency, they discover a mortar shipment was similarly redirected at the behest of two Senators. Raife approaches Representative Jay McArdle, a former SEAL, who promises to investigate but instead sabotages a further deal Trident True was brokering. Raife confronts him and promises to hunt down McArdle's "new friends" who are involved in the conspiracy. Al-Nawaz, in hiding in Beirut, profits from his recent attacks via shorting the markets. He plans to target Russia as vengence for their actions against Al-Qaeda affiliates in Syria, despite Farooq's warnings of starting conflicts on too many fronts. He has Farooq use the mortars to attack a Russian military base in Uzbekistan, killing dozens of paratroopers. When Rich's staffer Solomon is shot by poachers, Reece takes him to a hospital in Montepuez where he is captured on CCTV. He refuses Rich's offer of money and papers to help him escape, and allows himself to be arrested by the CIA at the reserve.
11	3	"Shooter Ready"	Carl Seaton	Allison Miller	October 21, 2026
Reece is brought to Freddy Strain, a senior Ground Branch officer and former SEAL. He is offered a presidential pardon for his crimes and surgery for the tumor in exchange for helping the CIA locate Farooq. The alternative is being handed over to the FBI, who will also aggressivley prosecute those who helped him previously. Reece reluctantly agrees, and trains in Morocco with a team led by Jules Landry. (Note: Who previously worked alongside Farooq and Edwards in 2015 in The Terminal List: Dark Wolf) In Washington, D.C., Buranek is promoted to editor after Andrenov purchases Voltstreem. Raife seeks her help investigating Congress's role in the redirected weapon shipments. They bug the office of Stewart McGovern, a lobbyist linked with the senators, discovering the codename Kestrel. McGovern is later killed. Reece struggles to understand what could have caused Farooq, who he knew as a secular ally dedicated to fighting terrorism, to switch his allegiance to Al-Qaeda. The CIA defend their Morocco compound from an assault by a well armed team and have to be rescued by a U.S. Army QRF. Maajid Kifayat, the compounds custodian, is killed. Reece identifies a dead attacker as someone he trained in Iraq with Farooq. He tells Strain he believes the attack happening after his recruitment isn't a coincidence, and that someone in the agency sold them out.
12	4	"Into the Labyrinth"	Tucker Gates & Ray Mendoza	John Lopez	October 21, 2026
The leader of Rojava is assassinated by skilled Al-Qaeda sniper Nizar Kattan. Strain, Landry and Reece track Farooq to Beirut, and meet with Rodriguez's CTMC Taskforce Echo at the United States Embassy. Reece uses himself as bait to draw out Farooq, who kidnaps him. Farooq claims he is in deep cover, and all actions he has done whilst embedded in Al-Qaeda (including attacking the Morocco base) were ordered by Landry, who he believes is compromised and working with Al-Nawaz. Farooq says warned Landry about the London attack, but he did nothing to stop it. He warns Reece that Al-Nawaz is planning a larger attack similar to 9/11, and allows him to escape with a phone containing evidence of his innocence and means to contact him. Andrenov uses his influence to get Hartley's estate to drop their lawsuit against Buranek so she can finish writing her book, and Raife finally agrees to go on the record as a source. She discovers Kestrel is an undigitized report in the National Archives Building. After obtaining a copy, Buranek is targeted by a pair of assassins in the parking lot. She manages to kill one, but is shot twice and badly injured. Raife saves her life at the last minute, shooting the second operative whilst he searches for the report in her handbag.
13	5	"Frogman Sh$t"	Tucker Gates & Ray Mendoza	Kenny Sheard	October 21, 2026
Raife takes Buranek to his friend Harper Kinney, an ex-Army medic who treats her wounds, stabilizes her with a blood transfusion and lets her recover at her house. He discovers Kestrel is a defunct program to arm democratic militias in hostile countries linked to his disgraced former CIA superior Jed Haverford. (Note: Imprisoned for treason since 2015 after failing to facilitate a nuclear Iran to force open war and regime change, as seen in The Terminal List: Dark Wolf) Raife presents the report to Yana Tomenko, Andrenov's chief of staff, who files a false missing person report on Buranek. Andrenov holds a press conference maintaining the lie Buranek is missing, and reveals publicly what she was investigating. Landry goes into hiding after being exposed. CIA Deputy Director Janice Motley authorizes Reece and Strain to track Farooq to his next meeting with Al-Nawaz in Ras al-Ayn. Landry also attends, exposing Farooq and convinces Al-Nawaz to work with him and an unknown benefactor who can supply weapons. Reece saves Farooq and Strain kills Al-Nawaz, but Landry and Al-Nawaz's lieutenant Tariq escape with instructions for the next attack. Raife meets a dying Haverford in Red Onion State Prison, who suspects one person involved in resurrecting Kestrel to divert weapon shipments is Oliver Grey, an unsuspecting CIA accountant on Taskforce Echo. Raife kills two assassins who target him once he leaves the prison.
14	6	"Rats in a Maze"	Ben Wheatley	Hennah Sekander	October 21, 2026
Buranek is moved to hospital, guarded by Andrenov's men and Otaktay. In Athens, Landry provides supplies to Al-Qaeda snipers Kattan and Tasho. Grey, who wishes to defect, pays Landry $10 million on behalf of his Russian handler. Reece captures Landry and subjects him to enhanced interrogation at a Kurdistan black site. Farooq grapples with guilt over his actions undercover that he believed was a legitimate mission from Landry. Raife tells Reece about Kestrel and Grey's involvement. Reece connects him with former Mossad agent Tal Varon (Note: Who previously worked with Edwards and Raife in 2015, as seen in The Terminal List: Dark Wolf) and Ground Branch operatives Ox and Eli to find Grey in Greece via facial recognition. After prolonged torture and probing into his criminal past before joining the USMC, Landry reveals the attack will take place at a ceasefire event hosted by Andrenov in Odesa. Grey takes delivery of redirected weapons at the Port of Piraeus, narrowly avoiding Raife's team. When further threatened, Landry later tells Farooq his true benefactor funding the conspiracy is a Russian colonel aligned with a ultranationalist crime syndicate named after the Black Hundreds. They wish to target America and, along with Grey, seem to have a personal vendetta against Reece. Farooq then castrates Landry with piano wire, letting him bleed to death.
15	7	"Every Bullet Has Its Destiny"	Marcos Siega	Jared Shaw	October 21, 2026
In 1997, Grey meets with the Colonel and his teenage nephew, Mishka, at Sandy Point State Park. He hands over MACV-SOG records on Reece's father, Thomas, who now works for the CIA. Rodriguez reveals the Colonel is retired Soviet GRU official Ivan Zharkov, who opposes the peace deal that also returns Crimea to Ukraine. In Odesa, Reece and Strain work with both the USSS and FPS to enforce security for President Grimes and President Drozdov. Grey enters the summit disguised as a photographer, transmitting location data to Kattan and Tasho. Raife tells Reece that two long range CheyTac M200 rifles, combat gear and NVG's were missing from the redirected shipment. The two suspect a long range sniper hit from a cargo ship and secondary attack in the Odesa catacombs. Strain takes a countersniper position, and Reece kills men who enter the Russian delegation hotel from the catacombs. President Drozdov is killed and the other leaders are evacuated. A corrupt FPS agent marks Strains position, but he is able to kill Tasho before being shot dead by Kattan, who escapes. Still diguised, Grey meets with Andrenov in his hotel, ostensibly for a photo shoot to project strength after the attack. After Tomenko leaves, Grey greets Andrenov as Mishka.
16	8	"Fathers and Sons"	Kate Dennis	Max Adams & Joshua Jacobs	October 21, 2026
Reece returns to the US a free man, and promises Strain's widow he will avenge his death. He and Raife determine that Odesa was a coup against Drozdov by Zharkov, who plans to install Andrenov as his replacement. Voltstreem publishes a story under Buranek's name blaming the U.S. and Ukraine for Odesa. Andrenov shocks Tomenko by announcing he is relocating to Moscow. Buranek reunites with Raife and Reece who explain their theory. Tomenko discovers Andrenov approved Grey's press credentials, and agrees to help bring him down. Raife, Reece, Otaktay and Farooq are sent by Rodriguez to occupied Kherson to intercept Andrenov. They engage his convoy and PMC security detail and extract Tomenko. Before being killed, Andrenov tells Reece it was supposed to be him killed on the roof in Odesa and the conspiracy is linked to his fathers "crimes against Russia". A month later, Zharkov's group distance themselves from Andrenov instead of admitting they couldn't protect him. The CIA explains to Reece the vendetta started after his father killed Zharkov's brother (Andrenov's father), a Soviet advisor to the Viet Cong. Reece also deduces Grey likely killed his father in Buenos Aires after noticing him wearing his distinctive damaged 1960 Submariner in Athens CCTV. Buranek finishes her book, but gives it to Reece instead of the publisher, opting to return to frontline reporting. Its contents convince Reece to undergo surgery to remove the tumor. In Saint Petersburg, Grey receives his next assignment from Zharkov.

== Production ==
In early April 2020, the series, starring Chris Pratt, was in development, and seeking out a distributor. In early May 2020, it was reported that Amazon Prime Video landed the series and Amazon Studios would be joining the series as production studio and the series was in the process of assembling a writers room. Taylor Kitsch, Constance Wu, Jeanne Tripplehorn, Riley Keough, and Pratt's brother-in-law Patrick Schwarzenegger joined the cast in early 2021.

In June 2021, LaMonica Garrett, Alexis Louder, Tom Amandes, J. D. Pardo, Christina Vidal Mitchell, Jared Shaw, Catherine Dyer, and Remi Adeleke joined the cast in recurring roles, while Arlo Mertz was cast as a series regular. In July 2021, Jai Courtney joined in a recurring role.

Pratt had previously portrayed a Navy SEAL in the 2012 film Zero Dark Thirty and had become friends with Navy SEAL Jared Shaw. Shaw knew Jack Carr from their time in the Navy, and shared an early copy of the book with Pratt, who had started a production company and was interested in developing his own projects. Carr said he had Pratt in mind when writing the story, and that he had hoped to get Antoine Fuqua as the director. Pratt got into a bidding war for the rights, only to discover that he was bidding against Fuqua, so instead they partnered on developing the project. Principal photography for The Terminal List began on March 9, 2021. Chris Pratt was paid $1.4 million per episode.

In February 2023, Amazon Prime Video renewed the series for a second season. The second season began filming in March 2025 and wrapped production in October 2025. In March 2025, Gabriel Luna and Martin Sensmeier joined the cast in recurring roles. In May 2025, Costa Ronin was cast in a recurring role. In July 2025, Edwin Hodge and Caitlin Bassett joined the cast in recurring roles.

== Release ==
The series premiered on Amazon Prime Video on July 1, 2022. The second season premiered on October 21, 2026.

== Reception ==
=== Audience viewership ===
The series was the number one show on Amazon Prime's "Top 10" list within two weeks of its premiere.

The Terminal List came in at No. 3 on the Nielsen chart with 1.1 billion minutes viewed across eight episodes.

=== Critical response ===
On Rotten Tomatoes the series has a 40% approval rating based on reviews from 58 critics, with an average rating of 5.7/10. The website's critics consensus reads, "While Chris Pratt fully commits himself to The Terminal List's mission, this thriller's unrelenting gruffness is no meat and all potatoes." Metacritic gave it a weighted average score of 40 out of 100 based on reviews from 25 critics, indicating "mixed or average reviews". CinemaBlend.com summarized the reviews saying critics agree the series was firmly in the "Shows For Dads" genre.

Dave Nemetz of TVLine panned the series, calling it "punishingly grim and hopelessly boneheaded." He criticized the series' plot and direction, writing, "the action is bloody but not exciting, and the story is bewildering but not interesting. In between, we get saccharine family scenes and a paint-by-numbers conspiracy that gets more complicated but not any more compelling." Daniel D'Addario of Variety called it "a dour, miserable sit, one that would be tough to take as a two-hour film, and has been inexplicably 'roided up to eight hours." Dan Fienberg of The Hollywood Reporter described the series as overcooked, taking "eight hours for a book that easily could have been adapted in two hours".

Liam Mathews of TV Guide rated series 7 out of 10, and compared it to other Amazon Prime Video series Bosch, Reacher and Jack Ryan, saying "These shows aren't chasing Emmys, they just want to entertain with a twisty plot, some thrilling action set pieces, and a mildly complex main character. They're also three of the service's most popular and successful shows. Prime Video's latest series, The Terminal List, fits that dad-friendly bill to a T. By the humble standards of the genre, The Terminal List is a smashing success."

Author Jack Carr responded to the negative critical responses, saying "The 95 percent viewer rating, audience rating, makes it all worth it. We didn't make it for the critics."

== Prequel ==
In February 2023, a prequel series focusing on Ben Edwards was ordered and set to air on Amazon Prime Video, with Taylor Kitsch reprising the role. In January 2024, it was reported that the prequel series will be titled The Terminal List: Dark Wolf, with Pratt reprising his role as James Reece. The show began filming on March 13, 2024. This series premiered on August 27, 2025.
