= Atria Publishing Group =

General interest publisher and a division of Simon & Schuster

- Parent company: Simon & Schuster
- Founded: 2002
- Country of origin: United States
- Headquarters location: Simon & Schuster Building; New York City
- Publication types: Books
- Imprints: Below
- Owner: Kohlberg Kravis Roberts
- Official website: www.simonandschusterpublishing.com/atria/

Atria Publishing Group is a general interest publisher and a division of Simon & Schuster. The publishing group launched as Atria Books in 2002. The Atria Publishing Group was later created internally at Simon & Schuster to house a number of imprints including Atria Books, Atria Trade Paperbacks, Atria Books Espanol, Atria Unbound, Washington Square Press, Emily Bestler Books, Atria/Beyond Words, Cash Money Content, Howard Books, Marble Arch Press, Strebor Books, 37 Ink, Keywords Press and Enliven Books. Atria is also known for creating innovative imprints and co-publishing deals with African-American writers as well as known for experimenting with digital or non-traditional print formats and authors.

As of 2021, Libby McGuire is the Publisher and Senior Vice President of the Atria Publishing Group.

== Early years ==
The Atria Books imprint was launched in 2002 by Judith Curr. According to a Publishers Weekly interview with Curr marking the imprint's 10th anniversary, the name Atria is "plural for a place where things grow and flourish." Curr wanted a name that embodied their intentions to build a bridge between the reader and the writer. Because she was starting a new business inside an old established one (Simon & Schuster was founded in 1924), Curr also gave it an "A" name so it "would be at the top of everyone's memo and everything is in alphabetical order at a publisher."

In 2005, Simon & Schuster acquired Strebor Books International and publisher of popular fiction by African-American writers including Black Erotica by Zane. Zane (aka Kristina Laferne Roberts) would remain the publisher of the imprint with an office in Maryland. The publisher had been founded independently in 1999. In 2013 it was announced that publisher Kristina Laferne Roberts had declared bankruptcy.

In 2009, Atria was the first publisher to partner with Vook. Curr took on publishing the first four of them as she wanted to integrate digital practices into Atria. Curr recognized that digital and traditional printing practices would go "hand in glove." The work with Vook lead to the creation of the Atria Smartbook—a physical piece of paper with QR codes throughout the text for enhanced content. Curr told the Digital Book World, "every week I get a report that tells me how many people have interacted with those pieces of content. And now I've got this whole idea of how to turn the book itself into a store."

== 2010s ==
Atria Books publishes a wide variety of both fiction and non-fiction and strives to publish a diverse set of books and authors. This includes programs for diverse voices, Internet personalities and self-published authors with proven track records. In some cases, an editor is given their own imprint with their name on it as with Emily Bestler in 2011.

In 2011, Atria signed a co-publishing deal with Cash Money Records founders Bryan "Birdman" Williams and Ronald "Slim" Williams for an imprint called Cash Money Content. Birdman's intention was to cross-promote books at music events. The imprint is headquartered in Miami.

As of 2012, 25% of the Atria Books list of 98 titles was part of an African-American publishing program overseen by Malaika Adero, Vice President and Senior Editor. Notable authors include Walter Mosley, Faria Chideya, Blair Underwood and Vickie Stringer. Strebor Books an imprint founded in 1999 by author Zane is also under the Atria Publishing Group. In an interview on NPR, Adero described the African-American market for books as quite varied. Atria Books Espanol publishes titles aimed at Hispanic readers in both English and Spanish.

In 2012, Simon & Schuster reorganized their adult publishing imprints into four main groups with Atria Publishing as one main group. Howard, a religious imprint based in Nashville was placed under the Atria Publishing Group.

In 2012, Atria partnered with the UK publisher Short Books' list to form Marble Arch Press to introduce international authors to American readers.

In 2013, Atria Publishing Group launched 37 INK to focus on a diverse list of books and authors including a focus on African-American voices.

In 2014, Atria Books launched Keywords Press to publish books by Internet personalities. The first set of authors included YouTube personalities, Shay Butler (aka ShayCarl), Shane Dawson, Justine Ezarik (aka iJustine), Connor Franta and Joey Graceffa. The launch was part of a deal between Atria Books and United Talent Agency (UTA) who represents a number of Internet personalities. Curr stated that many of the books from the imprint would be crowdsourced with authors working directly with their fans. The New York Times called the move an "acknowledgement by traditional media companies that YouTube celebrities are more than just niche entertainmers with quirky appeal, and can be marketed to a broader audience.

Atria Books demonstrated in 2014 its ability to build a bridge between the reader and the writer. Fans of Colleen Hoover, a romance author, took to social media and successfully persuaded Atria Books to publish a free e-novella by Hoover into a print book. Atria Books had received 5,000 tweets, posts and memes under the #FindingCinderella campaign.

Atria Books has also focused on finding and publishing successful self-published authors. In 2013, they signed 18 books by 8 self-published authors. Atria signs on a self-published author, reworks the previously published ebook if necessary, and then republishes them in new e-book and paperback editions. When looking for at a potential author they look at how emotionally connected the online reviews are with the storyline and characters.

In 2015, Atria launched Crave (ThisIsCrave.com), an application and subscription service for romance readers where subscribers receive one audio installment from a book each day.

Atria also launched Enliven Books in 2015, an imprint launched from author and tea entrepreneur, Zhena Muzyka, and focused on publishing spiritual and wellness books. Muzyka runs the publishing imprint from a yurt in Ojai, California. Muzkya reported to Publishers Weekly that the name for the imprint was the result of a phone call with her mother. Her mother told her, "As soon as you hang up the phone you are going to hear a word in your head." Muzkya said that the first word she heard was Enliven which means "to add color, to uplift."

== Imprints ==
- 37 INK, publisher of African-American and other diverse voices
- Atria Books, general publisher
- Atria Español, publisher of Spanish language books with a focus on Spanish readers in the U.S.
- Atria Trade Paperbacks, general trade paperback publisher
- Atria Unbound, ebook editions of Atria publications
- Beyond Words, a co-venture between Atria Books and publisher of mind-body-spirit titles including the Secret
- Cash Money Content, a co-venture with Cash Money Records
- Emily Bestler Books, publisher of fiction and non-fiction
- Enliven Books, publisher of Spiritual and Wellness books
- Howard Books, publisher of Christian books
- Keywords Press, publisher of books by Internet personalities
- Marble Arch Press, co-publishing venture with Short Books of the United Kingdom
- One Signal Publishers, nonfiction publisher
- Simon Element, publisher of cooking, health & wellness, finance and personal transformation books
- Skybound Books, co-publishing venture with Skybound Entertainment
- Strebor Books, publisher of African-American books as well as Black Erotica
- Washington Square Press, founded in 1959 as part of Pocketbooks and paperback publisher of classic and contemporary fiction

== Notable authors ==
The following are notable authors who publish under Atria Books. A more detailed list of authors can be found at List of Simon & Schuster Authors.

- Tina Turner
- Fredrick Backman
- Isabelle Allende
- Jennifer Weiner
- Jodi Picoult
- Rachel Ray
- K.A. Tucker
- Arianna Reiche
- Daniel Kraus
