= Ryanverse =

Media franchise created by Tom Clancy

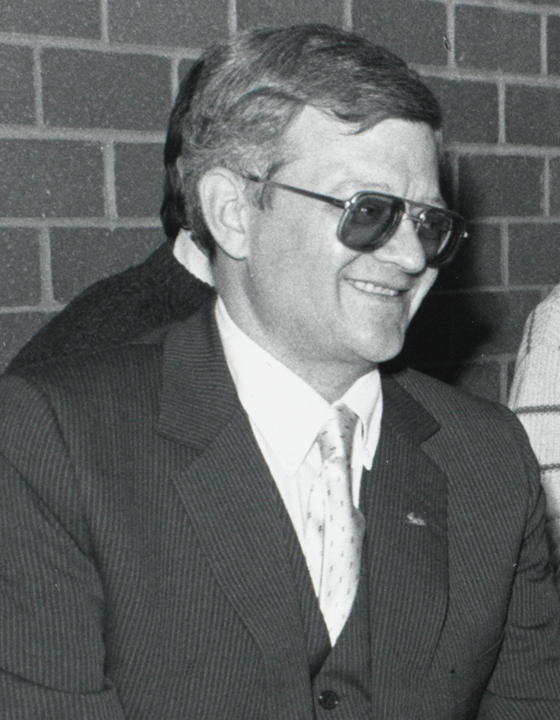
- Tom Clancy, the creator of the Ryanverse
- Created by: Tom Clancy
- Original work: The Hunt for Red October (1984)
- Owner: Paramount Skydance
- Years: 1984–present

Print publications
- Novel: List

Films and television
- Film: List
- Television series: Tom Clancy's Jack Ryan

Games
- Video game: List

Miscellaneous
- Character(s): List
- Portrayers: Alec Baldwin; Harrison Ford; Ben Affleck; Chris Pine; John Krasinski

The Ryanverse franchise focuses on the character Jack Ryan, a fictional CIA analyst created in 1984 by American author Tom Clancy, who appeared in fourteen of his novels. It also features CIA operative John Clark and The Campus, a covert counter-terrorism and intelligence organization. Since Clancy's death in 2013, five other authors have written authorized novels featuring Ryan and the Campus: Mark Greaney, Marc Cameron, Andrews and Wilson, and Ward Larsen. In addition, a spin-off series featuring Ryan's son Jack Junior was written by Grant Blackwood, Mike Maden, Don Bentley, M. P. Woodward, and Jack Stewart. The latest novel is Pressure Depth by Stewart, a Jack Junior novel published in September 2026.

Clancy's novels featuring the Ryanverse have charted at the top of the New York Times bestseller list, selling more than 100 million copies. They have been adapted for film, video games, and television. The films, starring Alec Baldwin, Harrison Ford, Ben Affleck, and Chris Pine as Ryan, have an unadjusted worldwide gross revenue of $788.4 million to date, making it the 57th-highest-grossing film series. Amazon Prime Video has also released a television series and feature film featuring John Krasinski as Ryan and a spinoff film featuring Michael B. Jordan as Clark. In addition, Clark has appeared in the Rainbow Six series of video games.

== Publication history ==
=== Concept and creation ===
Clancy developed the Jack Ryan character while working as an insurance agent in Maryland, drawing extensively from his early interests and personal background. Clancy, who grew up in an Irish-American family in Baltimore and was unable to serve in the military due to nearsightedness, developed a passion for military history and strategy from an early age. He was described as a "nerd" who enjoyed playing military board games and was an avid reader of military history books and science fiction.

The author's research methodology became central to his character and world-building process. Many of Clancy's insurance clients were former nuclear submariners, both officers and enlisted personnel, whose expertise he systematically gathered. He conducted extensive research using military publications such as Armed Forces Weekly and Jane's Defence Weekly, and collaborated with subject experts ranging from Soviet defectors to retired Air Force generals. Clancy based his first novel on the real-life attempted defection of the crew of the Soviet frigate Storozhevoy to Sweden.

According to character sketches discovered by the U.S. Naval Institute, Clancy originally envisioned Ryan as born in the 1950s, the son of a Baltimore police officer and hospital nurse. The character was designed to attend Clancy's own alma mater, Loyola High School, and earn an economics degree from Boston College before joining the United States Marine Corps. The detailed background included Ryan's career path from a helicopter crash injury during military service, through work at Merrill Lynch, to eventual recruitment by the CIA while working as an associate editor with the U.S. Naval Institute.

The character of Jack Ryan was modeled partly on former Director of Central Intelligence Robert Gates, with Clancy telling Gates that "You know, for the first several novels, I pretty much modeled Ryan's career on yours". This grounding in real-world intelligence careers helped establish the series' commitment to authenticity in depicting government operations and military technology. As for Clark, Clancy described him as "Ryan's dark side" and "more inclined to take physical action than Jack is."

=== Novels ===
==== Tom Clancy novels ====
Clancy's debut novel, The Hunt for Red October, was first published by Naval Institute Press in 1984. It marks the first appearance of Jack Ryan, an analyst working for the Central Intelligence Agency. He rises up the ranks in the CIA, eventually becoming Deputy Director in The Sum of All Fears. After a brief retirement from government service, Ryan is appointed National Security Advisor in Debt of Honor to deal with a crisis involving Japan. After being nominated as Vice President, he becomes President of the United States following a terrorist attack at the United States Capitol.

John Clark first appeared in The Cardinal of the Kremlin, with his origin story established in Without Remorse. A former Navy SEAL as John Terrence Kelly, he fakes his death after waging a one-man war on drug dealers in Baltimore in order to avoid capture by Ryan's father Emmet, a police lieutenant. Clark becomes a CIA officer and first meets Ryan in Clear and Present Danger as they work to rescue a U.S. Army black ops unit abandoned by the government after carrying out a secret war against the Medellin Cartel in Colombia. Clark meets Domingo "Ding" Chavez during the rescue, and they later work together in the CIA. Clark later forms the elite international counter-terrorism organization known as Rainbow, as depicted in Rainbow Six.

Ryan later finishes his term as President and creates The Campus, a covert counter-terrorism and intelligence organization fronting as Hendley Associates, a financial trading firm, in The Teeth of the Tiger. His son, Jack Junior, and his nephews, Dominic and Brian Caruso, are its first recruits. A prequel novel, Red Rabbit, focuses on Ryan as a CIA liaison with British foreign intelligence as he uncovers a plot to assassinate Pope John Paul II. All the books were published in the United States through G. P. Putnam's Sons.

1. The Hunt for Red October (1984)
2. Patriot Games (1987)
3. The Cardinal of the Kremlin (1988)
4. Clear and Present Danger (1989)
5. The Sum of All Fears (1991)
6. Without Remorse (1993)
7. Debt of Honor (1994)
8. Executive Orders (1996)
9. Rainbow Six (1998)
10. The Bear and the Dragon (2000)
11. Red Rabbit (2002)
12. The Teeth of the Tiger (2003)

==== Collaborations ====
After a seven-year break from writing fiction, Clancy returned in 2010 with Dead or Alive, co-written with Grant Blackwood. It brought Ryan, Clark, Chavez, and the Campus together in what was called the All-Star Team.

The spin-off novel Against All Enemies, co-written with Peter Telep, features ex-Navy SEAL and CIA paramilitary officer Max Moore. A sequel, Search and Destroy, remains unpublished.

Clancy co-wrote his final three novels with Mark Greaney, with Command Authority posthumously released after his death in 2013. In the books, Ryan becomes President for a second time, and Clark and Chavez start working for The Campus alongside Jack Junior.

1. Dead or Alive (with Grant Blackwood) (2010)
2. Against All Enemies (with Peter Telep) (2011)
3. Locked On (with Mark Greaney) (2011)
4. Threat Vector (with Mark Greaney) (2012)
5. Command Authority (with Mark Greaney) (2013)

==== Post-Clancy novels ====
After Clancy's death, a Campus spin-off novel featuring Dominic Caruso, Support and Defend, was written by Greaney and published in 2014. Greaney went on to write three more novels featuring Ryan and the Campus. In 2017, Marc Cameron picked up the series and wrote seven novels, including the Cold War prequel Red Winter. In 2024, Andrews and Wilson continued the Jack Ryan series starting with Act of Defiance, a direct sequel to The Hunt for Red October released on the 40th anniversary of its publication. They announced their exit in 2025 and were briefly replaced by Ward Larsen before M. P. Woodward is slated to take over in late 2026.

1. Support and Defend (2014, by Mark Greaney)
2. Full Force and Effect (2014, by Mark Greaney)
3. Commander in Chief (2015, by Mark Greaney)
4. True Faith and Allegiance (2016, by Mark Greaney)
5. Power and Empire (2017, by Marc Cameron)
6. Oath of Office (2018, by Marc Cameron)
7. Code of Honor (2019, by Marc Cameron)
8. Shadow of the Dragon (2020, by Marc Cameron)
9. Chain of Command (2021, by Marc Cameron)
10. Red Winter (2022, by Marc Cameron)
11. Command and Control (2023, by Marc Cameron)
12. Act of Defiance (2024, by Andrews and Wilson)
13. Defense Protocol (2024, by Andrews and Wilson)
14. Executive Power (2025, by Andrews and Wilson)
15. Rules of Engagement (2026, by Ward Larsen)
16. The Coldest War (forthcoming 2026, by M. P. Woodward)

==== Jack Ryan Jr. ====
The Jack Ryan Jr. spin-off series was started by Blackwood, who wrote two novels. It was continued by Mike Maden in 2017, who wrote four novels, and in 2021 by Don Bentley, who wrote four more. In 2023, M. P. Woodward was announced to continue the series, followed by Jack Stewart in 2025.

1. Under Fire (2015, by Grant Blackwood)
2. Duty and Honor (2016, by Grant Blackwood)
3. Point of Contact (2017, by Mike Maden)
4. Line of Sight (2018, by Mike Maden)
5. Enemy Contact (2019, by Mike Maden)
6. Firing Point (2020, by Mike Maden)
7. Target Acquired (2021, by Don Bentley)
8. Zero Hour (2022, by Don Bentley)
9. Flash Point (2023, by Don Bentley)
10. Weapons Grade (2023, by Don Bentley)
11. Shadow State (2024, by M. P. Woodward)
12. Line of Demarcation (2025, by M. P. Woodward)
13. Terminal Velocity (2025, by M. P. Woodward)
14. Pressure Depth (2026, by Jack Stewart)
15. Zero Point (forthcoming 2027, by Jack Stewart)

=== Chronological order of novels ===
Early novels in the Ryanverse are set during and after the Cold War. From The Teeth of the Tiger onwards, the Ryanverse follows a fluid timeline referencing recent real-life events such as the September 11 attacks and the 2003 invasion of Iraq while depicting Jack Ryan as president of the United States from Threat Vector onwards as of 2026.

Chrono. order	Pub. order	Title	Plot timeline	Written by
1	6	Without Remorse (1993)	1969-1973	Tom Clancy
2	2	Patriot Games (1987)	1981-1982	Tom Clancy
3	11	Red Rabbit (2002)	1982	Tom Clancy
4	1	The Hunt for Red October (1984)	1984	Tom Clancy
5	35	Red Winter (2022)	1985	Marc Cameron
6	3	The Cardinal of the Kremlin (1988)	1986	Tom Clancy
7	4	Clear and Present Danger (1989)	1988	Tom Clancy
8	5	The Sum of All Fears (1991)	1990-1991	Tom Clancy
9	7	Debt of Honor (1994)	1995-1996	Tom Clancy
10	8	Executive Orders (1996)	1996-1998	Tom Clancy
11	9	Rainbow Six (1998)	1999-2001	Tom Clancy
12	10	The Bear and the Dragon (2000)	2002	Tom Clancy
13	12	The Teeth of the Tiger (2003)	2006	Tom Clancy
14	13	Dead or Alive (2010)	2007	Tom Clancy & Grant Blackwood
15	14	Against All Enemies (2011)	2008	Tom Clancy & Peter Telep
16	15	Locked On (2011)	2008	Tom Clancy & Mark Greaney
17	16	Threat Vector (2012)	2009	Tom Clancy & Mark Greaney
18	17	Command Authority (2013)	2010	Tom Clancy & Mark Greaney
19	18	Support and Defend (2014)	2010	Mark Greaney
20	19	Full Force and Effect (2014)	2010	Mark Greaney
21	20	Under Fire (2015)	2010	Grant Blackwood
22	21	Commander in Chief (2015)	2010	Mark Greaney
23	22	Duty and Honor (2016)	2011	Grant Blackwood
24	23	True Faith and Allegiance (2016)	2011	Mark Greaney
25	24	Point of Contact (2017)	2012	Mike Maden
26	25	Power and Empire (2017)	2017	Marc Cameron
27	26	Line of Sight (2018)	2018	Mike Maden
28	27	Oath of Office (2018)	2018	Marc Cameron
29	28	Enemy Contact (2019)	2019	Mike Maden
30	29	Code of Honor (2019)	2019	Marc Cameron
31	30	Firing Point (2020)	2020	Mike Maden
32	31	Shadow of the Dragon (2020)	2020	Marc Cameron
33	32	Target Acquired (2021)	2021	Don Bentley
34	33	Chain of Command (2021)	2021	Marc Cameron
35	34	Zero Hour (2022)	2022	Don Bentley
36	36	Flash Point (2023)	2023	Don Bentley
37	37	Weapons Grade (2023)	2023	Don Bentley
38	38	Command and Control (2023)	2023	Marc Cameron
39	39	Act of Defiance (2024)	2024	Andrews and Wilson
40	40	Shadow State (2024)	2024	M. P. Woodward
41	41	Defense Protocol (2024)	2024	Andrews and Wilson
42	42	Line of Demarcation (2025)	2025	M. P. Woodward
43	43	Terminal Velocity (2025)	2025	M. P. Woodward
44	44	Executive Power (2025)	2025	Andrews and Wilson
45	45	Rules of Engagement (2026)	2026	Ward Larsen
46	46	Pressure Depth (2026)	2026	Jack Stewart
47	47	The Coldest War (2026)	TBD	M. P. Woodward
48	48	Zero Point (2027)	TBD	Jack Stewart

== Characters ==
=== Cast ===
Some of the key characters in the Ryanverse have been portrayed in the following films and television series:

Character	Films							Television			
Character	First film series			Second film series	Third film series	Spin-off series	Fourth film series	Television series			
Character	The Hunt for Red October	Patriot Games	Clear and Present Danger	The Sum of All Fears	Jack Ryan: Shadow Recruit	Without Remorse	Jack Ryan: Ghost War	Season 1	Season 2	Season 3	Season 4
Character	1990	1992	1994	2002	2014	2021	2026	2018	2019	2022	2023
Jack Ryan	Alec Baldwin	Harrison Ford	Harrison Ford	Ben Affleck	Chris Pine		John Krasinski	John Krasinski	John Krasinski	John Krasinski	John Krasinski
Catherine Ryan (née Muller)	Gates McFadden	Anne Archer	Anne Archer	Bridget Moynahan	Keira Knightley			Abbie Cornish			Abbie Cornish
James Greer	James Earl Jones	James Earl Jones	James Earl Jones				Wendell Pierce	Wendell Pierce	Wendell Pierce	Wendell Pierce	Wendell Pierce
Sally Ryan	Louise Borras	Thora Birch	Thora Birch								
John Clark			Willem Dafoe	Liev Schreiber		Michael B. Jordan					
Robert "Bob" Ritter			Henry Czerny			Jamie Bell					
Olson / Rob Behringer				Colm Feore	Colm Feore						
Viktor Cherevin / Rykov					Kenneth Branagh	Brett Gelman					
Matice Garth/Jeff								John Hoogenakker	John Hoogenakker		
Mike November							Michael Kelly		Michael Kelly	Michael Kelly	Michael Kelly
Marko Ramius	Sean Connery										
Bart Mancuso	Scott Glenn										
Vasily Borodin	Sam Neill										
Andrei Lysenko	Joss Ackland										
Kevin O'Donnell		Patrick Bergin									
Sean Miller		Sean Bean									
William Holmes		James Fox									
Robby Jackson		Samuel L. Jackson									
Félix Cortez			Joaquim de Almeida								
Ernesto Escobedo			Miguel Sandoval								
Bennett			Donald Moffat								
Domingo "Ding" Chavez			Raymond Cruz								Michael Peña
William Cabot				Morgan Freeman							
J. Robert Fowler				James Cromwell							
Anatoly Grushkov				Michael Byrne							
Thomas Harper					Kevin Costner						
Dixon Lewis					David Paymer						
Karen Greer						Jodie Turner-Smith					
Rowdy						Luke Mitchell					
Thunder						Jack Kesy					
Pastor West						Colman Domingo					
Hatchet						Jacob Scipio					
Keith Webb						Cam Gigandet					
Dallas						Todd Lasance					
Mousa bin Suleiman								Ali Suliman			
Hanin Ali								Dina Shihabi			
Harriet "Harry" Baumann									Noomi Rapace		
Nicolás Reyes									Jordi Molla		
Miguel Ubarri									Francisco Denis		
Gloria Bonalde									Cristina Umaña		
Marcus Bishop									Jovan Adepo		
Elizabeth Wright							Betty Gabriel			Betty Gabriel	Betty Gabriel
Luka Goncharov										James Cosmo	
Petr Kovac										Peter Guinness	
Alena Kovac									Nina Hoss		
Alexei Petrov										Alexej Manvelov	

=== Presidents ===
Six presidents are depicted in the Ryanverse, although only five are named:

- The unnamed man referred to as "the President" or later by his Secret Service codename "Wrangler", is first introduced in The Hunt for Red October; he remains in office through The Cardinal of the Kremlin and Clear and Present Danger. At the end of the last novel, he runs for reelection and is defeated.
- J. Robert Fowler, former governor of Ohio, defeats the incumbent president at the end of Clear and Present Danger and is in office during The Sum of All Fears. After his failure to handle the Denver crisis nearly results in nuclear war, he resigns from office at the end of the novel.
- Roger Durling, Fowler's vice president, former governor of California and a Vietnam veteran with service in the 82nd Airborne Division. Durling replaces Fowler when he resigns and is the President in Debt of Honor. He nearly completes Fowler's term as president and is planning a reelection campaign when he is killed along with most of the government when a Japanese jetliner crashes into the Capitol.
- John Patrick Ryan is confirmed as Durling's new vice president at the end of Debt of Honor, and is sworn in as president when Durling is murdered on the same day. His claim to the presidency is contested by Durling's former vice president Ed Kealty in Executive Orders, but the courts eventually rule in Ryan's favor. He is mentioned during Rainbow Six although he never appears, and is depicted as president in The Bear and the Dragon. Ryan chooses not to run for re-election between the events of The Bear and The Dragon and The Teeth of The Tiger.
- Robert Jefferson "Robby" Jackson succeeds Ryan as President of the United States after Ryan retires (as described in The Teeth of the Tiger), with Ryan believing he could leave the country in Robby's capable hands. After serving out the remainder of Ryan's term, Robby campaigned for his own re-election. While travelling in Mississippi, however, Jackson was assassinated by Duane Farmer, a 67-year-old member of the Ku Klux Klan.
- Edward Jonathan Kealty: Durling's former vice president, replaced by Jack Ryan after a sex scandal. When incumbent president Robby Jackson is assassinated while campaigning, Kealty is elected president in his own right, a position he holds from The Teeth of the Tiger to Locked On.
- John Patrick Ryan: begins his campaign for re-election during the events of Dead or Alive, defeats Kealty by a narrow margin in Locked On and assumes office prior to the events of Threat Vector. He is depicted as president in all subsequent Ryanverse novels.

Various books contain references to the presidencies of Ronald Reagan and George H. W. Bush as if they had happened.

=== The Campus ===
Beginning with The Teeth of the Tiger, Ryanverse novels feature The Campus, a covert counter-terrorism and intelligence organization. Hendley Associates, a private trading and arbitrage company, serves as a legitimate cover for the organization, or its "white-side". They fund The Campus's intelligence operations by stock market trades influenced by captured intelligence data, thus removing federal oversight and allowing free rein in the Campus's operations. The Campus was later integrated by President Ryan and Director of National Intelligence Mary Pat Foley into the U.S. intelligence community in Flash Point to deal with a crisis at the South China Sea.

- Gerald Paul "Gerry" Hendley Jr.: founder & CEO. A former Democratic senator from South Carolina, Hendley was tasked by then-President Ryan to lead The Campus and its cover Hendley Associates.
- John Clark: director of operations. He was employed by The Campus after retiring from the CIA and Rainbow in Dead or Alive, and after a brief retirement replaces Sam Granger as operations head in Command Authority.
- Domingo "Ding" Chavez: senior operations officer. Along with Clark, he was recruited by The Campus after retiring from the CIA and Rainbow. Ding helps train new agents for the Campus as well and participates in field operations.
- Gavin Biery: director of information technology
- Jack Ryan Jr.: intelligence analyst and operations officer. Originally an analyst, he becomes more involved in field operations from Dead or Alive onwards, initially to the concern of his father. He becomes a team leader in Flash Point. He is also depicted as a venture capitalist for Hendley Associates from Line of Demarcation onwards.
- Dominic "Dom" Caruso: operations officer and former FBI special agent
- Adara Sherman: operations officer from True Faith and Allegiance onwards and former director of transportation. In a relationship with Dom Caruso.
- Bartosz "Barry" Jankowski (call sign "Midas"): operations officer and former Delta Force operator. Recruited by Clark in True Faith and Allegiance.
- Lisanne Robertson: operations officer and former director of transportation. Introduced in Power and Empire. Loses her left arm in Shadow of the Dragon. Engaged to Jack Junior at the end of Flash Point, but breaks off the engagement at the end of Terminal Velocity.
- Master Sergeant Cary Marks: a member of Operational Detachment Alpha 555 who worked with the Campus on several missions. Introduced in Target Acquired and appears in subsequent Jack Junior novels.
- Sergeant First Class Jad Mustafa: a member of Operational Detachment Alpha 555 who worked with the Campus on several missions. Introduced in Target Acquired and appears in subsequent Jack Junior novels.
- Steven "Chilly" Edwards: operations officer. Introduced in Chain of Command as a police officer in Abilene, Texas who rescues First Lady Cathy Ryan from Camarilla operatives and is recruited by Clark and Chavez at the end of the novel.
- Amanda "Mandy" Cobb: operations officer and graduate of the FBI Academy. First appeared in Command and Control.
- Master Chief Kendrick Moore: operations officer. A former Navy SEAL team leader, Moore was forced out after an Islamic State defector told The New York Times that his team had killed a suspected terrorist while under interrogation. Recruited by Clark in Shadow State and appears in subsequent Jack Junior novels.
- Tom Buck: an active-duty Marine Raider who worked with the Campus on an operation in Pakistan in Terminal Velocity
- Helen Reid: pilot of Hendley Associates's Gulfstream G550
- Chester "Country" Hicks: co-pilot of Hendley Associates's Gulfstream G550
- Sam Driscoll: operations officer and former Army Ranger. He was recruited by Clark after the Kealty administration dropped murder charges against him for killing sleeping Middle Eastern terrorists in a cave in Pakistan during the hunt for the Emir in Dead or Alive. Dies in an operation in Mexico City in Full Force and Effect.
- Brian Caruso: operations officer and former Marine Major, and Dom's brother. Dies in an operation in Libya in Dead or Alive.
- Jerry Rounds: chief of strategic planning / director of intelligence
- Rick Bell: chief of analysis
- Sam Granger: director of operations. Killed by the Chinese in Threat Vector.
- Tony Wills: intelligence analyst who originally trained Jack Ryan Jr. on the intelligence side of The Campus

== Adaptations ==
=== Films ===
First film series	The Hunt for Red October (1990): directed by John McTiernan, and starring Sean Connery, Alec Baldwin, Scott Glenn, James Earl Jones, and Sam Neill. The film was a commercial success and was nominated for a number of accolades, including winning the Academy Award for Best Sound Editing, and received nominations for Best Sound Mixing and Best Film Editing.; Patriot Games (1992): directed by Phillip Noyce, and starring Harrison Ford, Sean Bean, Patrick Bergin, James Earl Jones, and Samuel L. Jackson. The film was a commercial success and generally received positive reviews from critics, although some critics who had read the book felt it diverged too much from its source.; Clear and Present Danger (1994): directed by Phillip Noyce, and starring Harrison Ford, Willem Dafoe, Donald Moffat, James Earl Jones, and Raymond Cruz. The film was a commercial success and received positive reviews from critics, it was also nominated at the Academy Awards for Best Sound Mixing and Best Sound Editing.
Second film series	The Sum of All Fears (2002): directed by Phil Alden Robinson, and starring Ben Affleck, Morgan Freeman, James Cromwell, Bridget Moynahan, and Liev Schreiber. The film was a commercial success and received mixed reviews from critics, some criticizing Affleck's performance, others praising Freeman's characterization.
Third film series	Jack Ryan: Shadow Recruit (2014): directed by Kenneth Branagh, and starring Chris Pine, Kevin Costner, Kenneth Branagh, Keira Knightley, and Len Kudrjawizki. The film was a commercial success and received average reviews, with praise for Branagh's direction, and the performances of the cast, citing both Pine and Branagh for special mention for their performances.
Spin-off series	Without Remorse (2021): directed by Stefano Sollima, and starring Michael B. Jordan, Jamie Bell, Jodie Turner-Smith, and Luke Mitchell. Originally to be theatrically released by Paramount Pictures, due to the COVID-19 pandemic, Amazon Studios acquired the rights and released it on Amazon Prime Video on April 30, 2021.
Fourth film series	Jack Ryan: Ghost War (2026): directed by Andrew Bernstein, and starring John Krasinski reprising his role as Ryan from the Amazon Prime Video series, with Wendell Pierce, Michael Kelly, and Sienna Miller.

=== Television ===
A television series adaptation, Tom Clancy's Jack Ryan, premiered on August 31, 2018, on Amazon Prime Video. The show was created by Carlton Cuse and Graham Roland, with Michael Bay as an executive producer and production company Platinum Dunes and Paramount Television serving as a co-production studio partners. John Krasinski stars in the title role. The series ran for four seasons and ended in 2023. It was followed by a feature film, Jack Ryan: Ghost War, in 2026.

==== Actors who played Jack Ryan ====
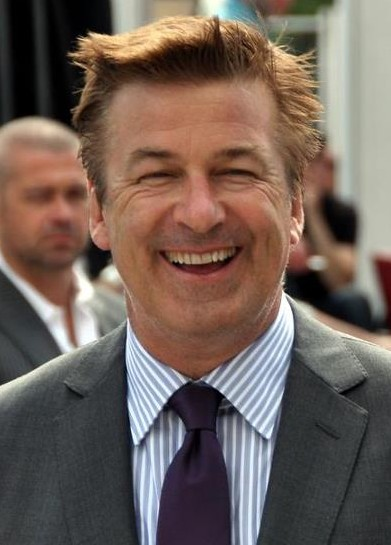
Alec Baldwin
(1990)

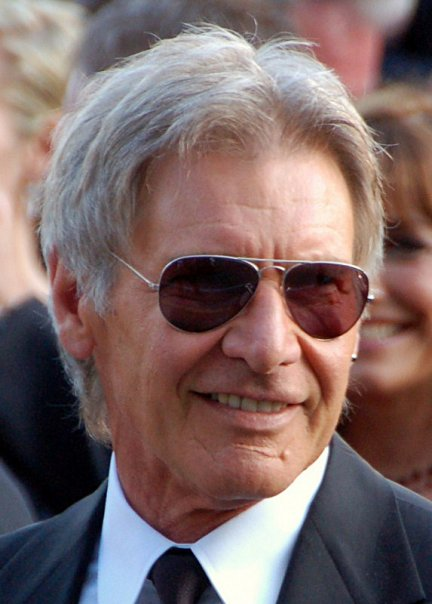
Harrison Ford
(1992, 1994)

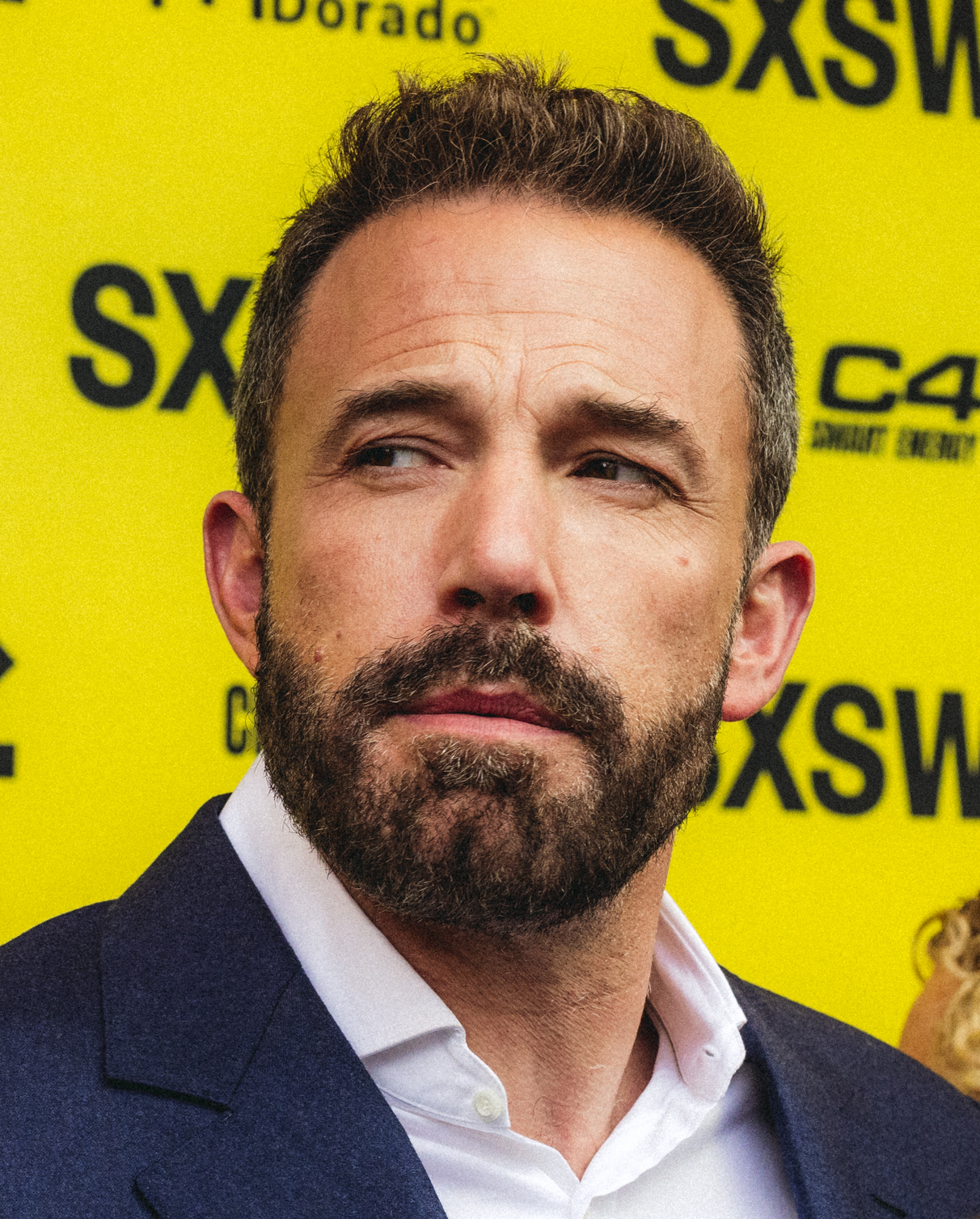
Ben Affleck
(2002)

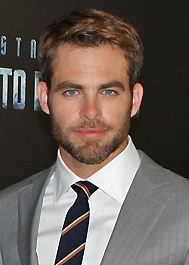
Chris Pine
(2014)

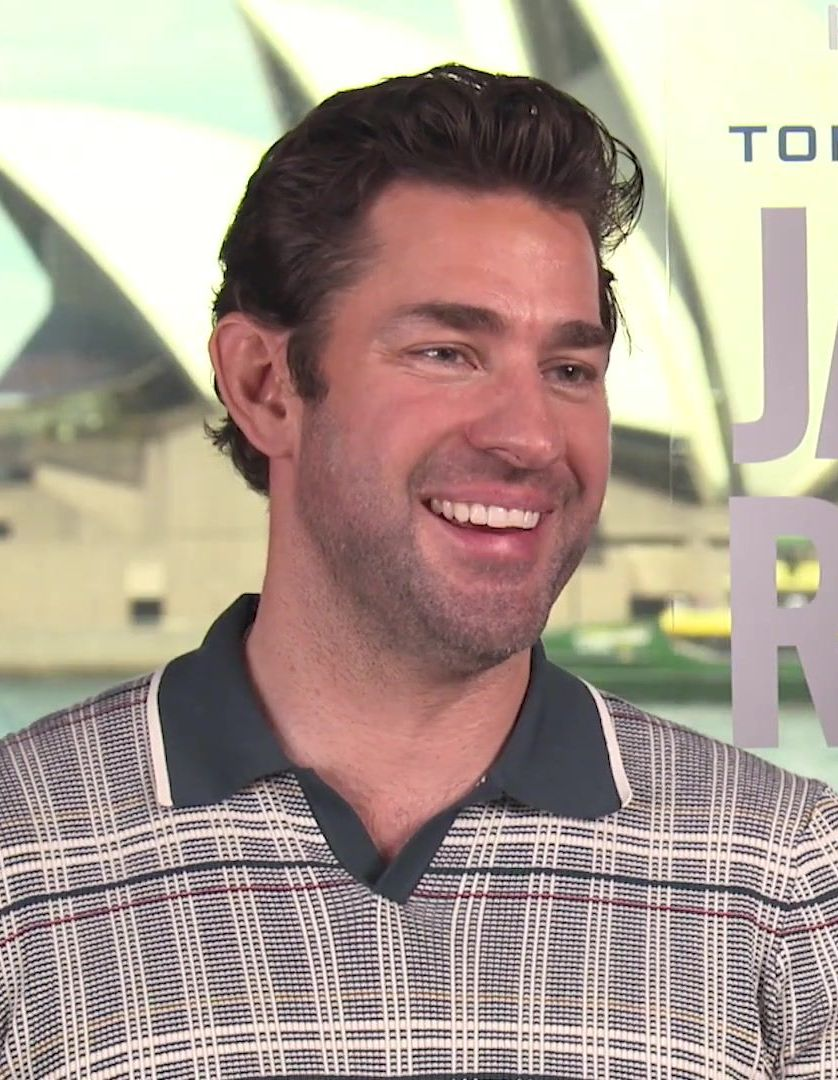
John Krasinski
(2018–2023, 2026)

==== Actors who played John Clark ====
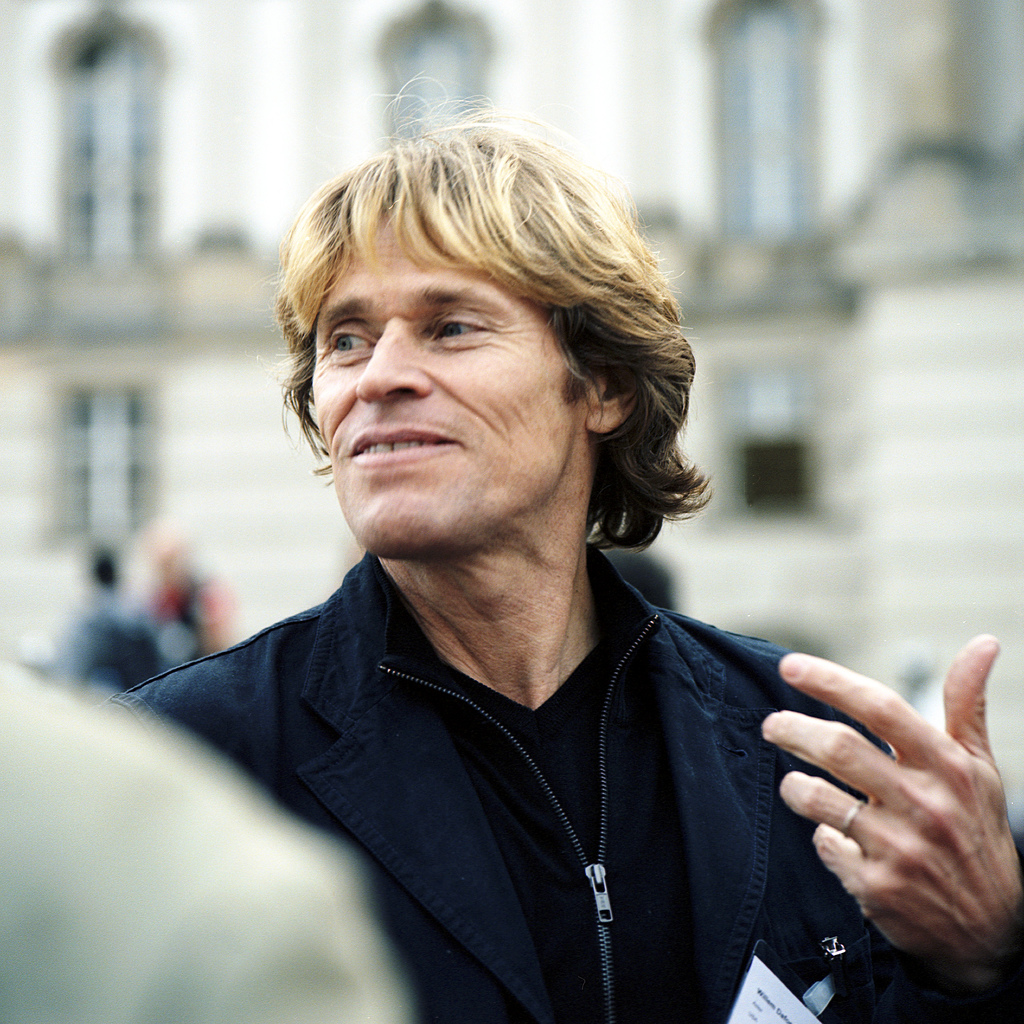
Willem Dafoe
(1994)

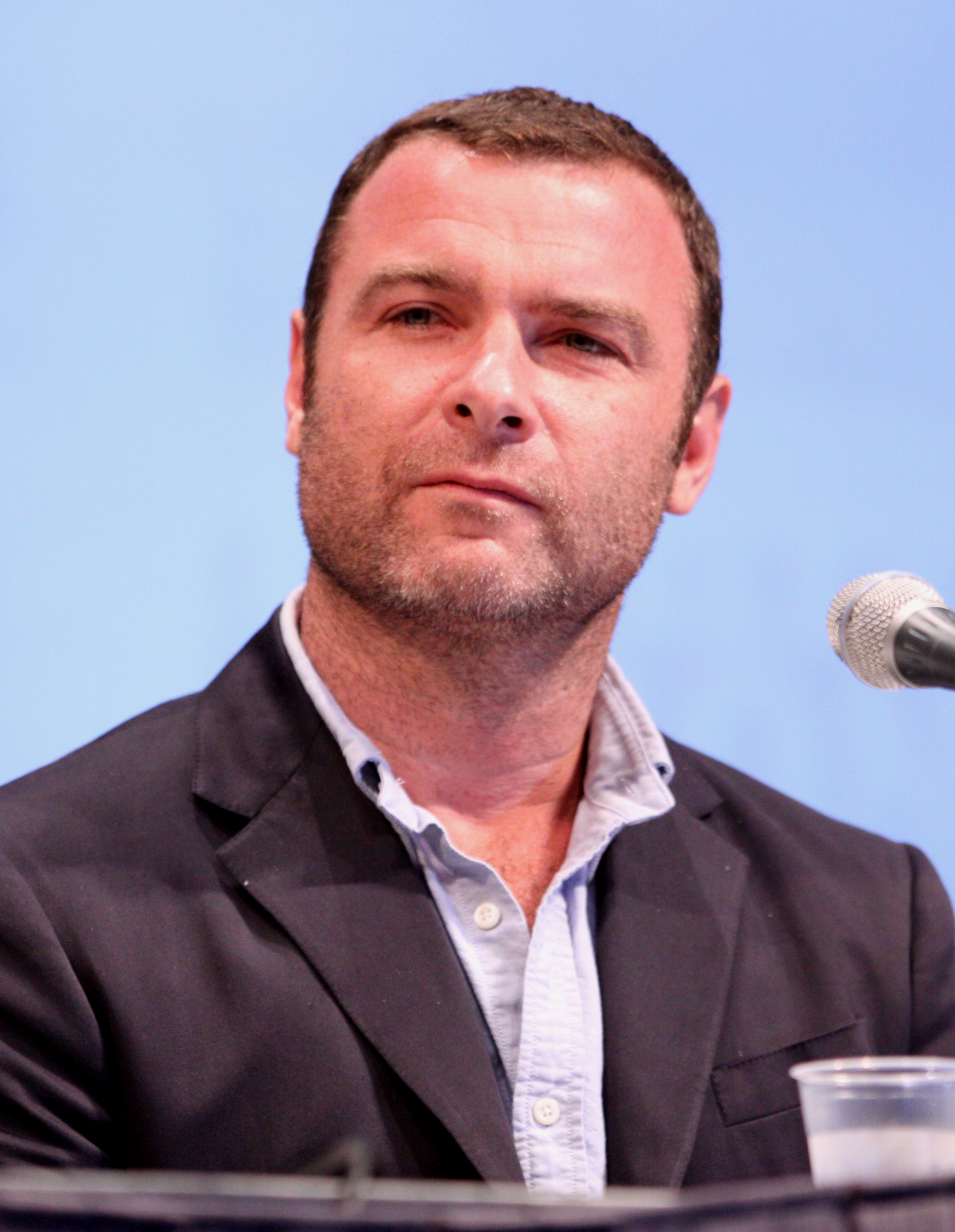
Liev Schreiber
(2002)

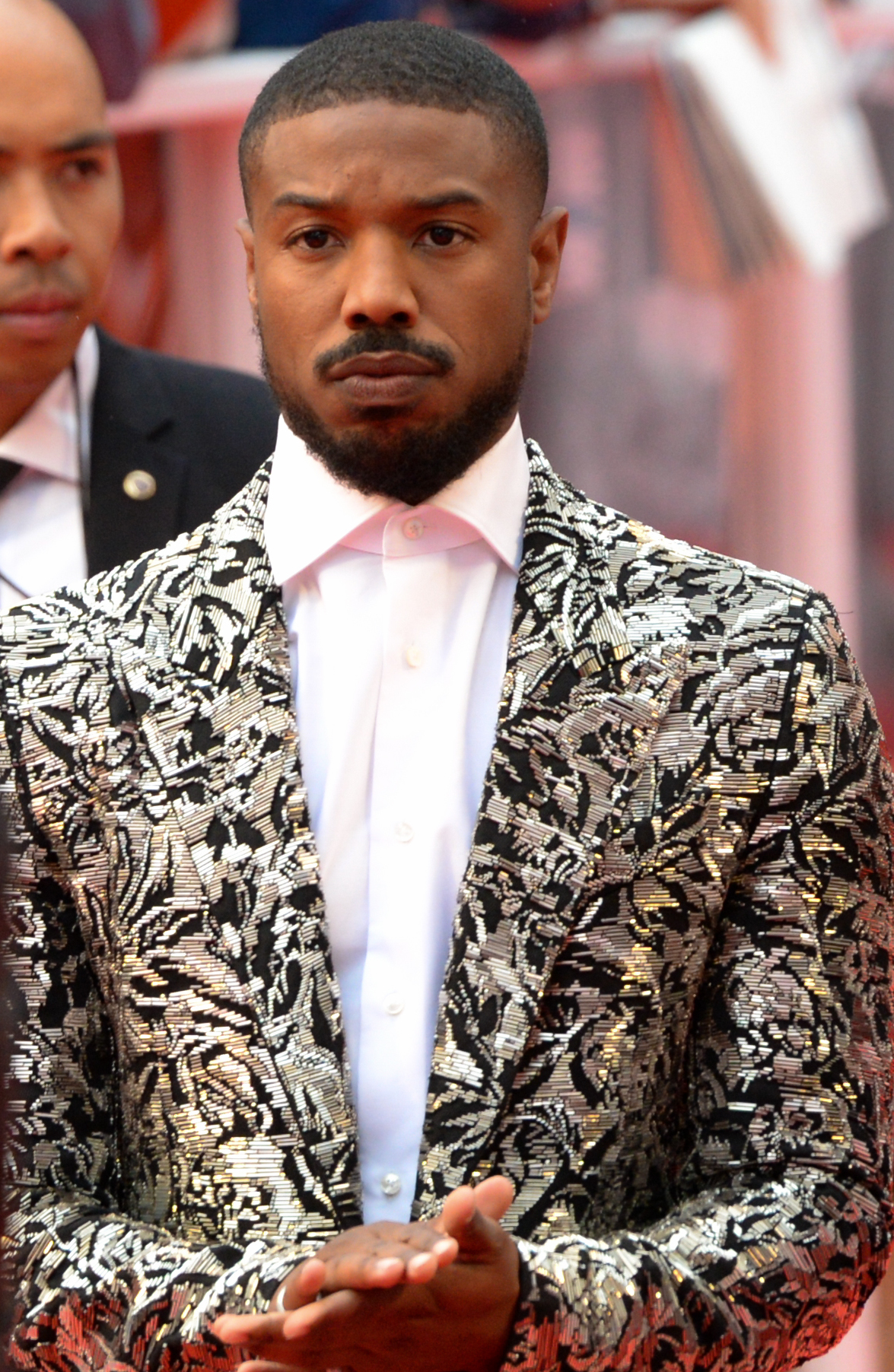
Michael B. Jordan
(2021)

=== Video games ===
Many video games based on the Ryanverse have been made, some based on the novels, some on the films, some on the spin-offs.

- The Hunt for Red October (1987): based on the book The Hunt for Red October. It was released for the Atari ST, Amiga, Apple II, ZX Spectrum, MSX, Commodore 64 and IBM PC. The player must navigate the Red October towards U.S. waters while avoiding the Soviet Navy. The game is a combination of submarine simulator and strategy game.
- The Hunt for Red October (1990): based on the movie The Hunt for Red October. It was released for the Amiga, Amstrad CPC, Atari ST, Commodore 64, MS-DOS, and ZX Spectrum. The game features five action sequences including jumping from a helicopter and navigating submarines through deep channels and avoiding many obstacles.
- The Sum of All Fears (2002): based on the movie The Sum of All Fears. It was released for Microsoft Windows, Game Boy Advance, PlayStation 2, and the GameCube. It is a tactical first-person shooter where various mission must be completed including saving hostages in a Charleston, West Virginia television station, and shutting down the operations of a West Virginian militia.

==== Rainbow Six games ====
The novel Rainbow Six became the basis for a series of tactical first-person shooter video games.

== Bibliography ==
- Clancy, Tom (1984). Hunt for Red October, The. Naval Institute Press. ISBN 0-8702-1285-0.
- Clancy, Tom (1987). Patriot Games. G. P. Putnam's Sons. ISBN 0-3991-3241-4.
- Clancy, Tom (1988). Cardinal of the Kremlin, The. G. P. Putnam's Sons. ISBN 0-3991-3345-3.
- Clancy, Tom (1989). Clear and Present Danger. G. P. Putnam's Sons. ISBN 0-3991-3440-9.
- Clancy, Tom (1991). Sum of All Fears, The. G. P. Putnam's Sons. ISBN 0-3991-3615-0.
- Clancy, Tom (1993). Without Remorse. G. P. Putnam's Sons. ISBN 0-3991-3825-0.
- Clancy, Tom (1994). Debt of Honor. G. P. Putnam's Sons. ISBN 0-3991-3954-0.
- Clancy, Tom (1996). Executive Orders. G. P. Putnam's Sons. ISBN 0-3991-4218-5.
- Clancy, Tom (1998). Rainbow Six. G. P. Putnam's Sons. ISBN 0-3991-4390-4.
- Clancy, Tom (2000). Bear and the Dragon, The. G. P. Putnam's Sons. ISBN 0-3991-4563-X.
- Clancy, Tom (2002). Red Rabbit. G. P. Putnam's Sons. ISBN 0-3991-4870-1.
- Clancy, Tom (2003). Teeth of the Tiger, The. G. P. Putnam's Sons. ISBN 0-3991-5079-X.
