= Support and Defend =

2014 thriller novel by Mark Greaney

- Author: Mark Greaney
- Audio read by: Scott Brick
- Language: English
- Series: The Campus
- Genre: Thriller; Spy fiction
- Publisher: G.P. Putnam's Sons
- Publication date: July 22, 2014
- Publication place: United States
- Media type: Print (Hardcover, Paperback), Audio, eBook
- Pages: 512
- ISBN: 9780425279229
- Preceded by: Command Authority
- Followed by: Full Force and Effect

Support and Defend (stylized as Tom Clancy Support and Defend, Tom Clancy: Support and Defend, or Tom Clancy's Support and Defend in the United Kingdom) is an action thriller novel, written by Mark Greaney and published on July 22, 2014. It is the first book in the Ryanverse released after its creator Tom Clancy's death in 2013, as well as Greaney's first solo entry in the franchise.

Support and Defend features FBI agent and The Campus operative Dominic "Dom" Caruso, President Jack Ryan's nephew, as he tracks down a seemingly rogue National Security Council (NSC) staffer. It debuted at number three in the New York Times bestseller list.

== Plot ==
Dominic "Dom" Caruso is in India, training with former Israeli commando Arik Yacoby on a six-week training program in Krav Maga. One night, the Yacoby family are attacked in a home invasion, which ends with one of the intruders detonating a suicide vest, killing the whole family and injuring Caruso. It was later revealed that the attack on Yacoby was the result of a recent data breach in the National Security Council (NSC), which staffer Ethan Ross inadvertently set into motion when he took top secret files and shared them with an international whistleblowing organization called the International Transparency Project (ITP).

After the attack, the NSC schedules a lie detector test, which leads Ross to panic. He was then asked by ITP head Gianni Bertoli to scrape the government's servers for classified data and store them in a flash drive as insurance in case the techniques for "beating the polygraph" does not work. Unbeknownst to them, the flash drive was provided by Iranian agent Mohammed Mobasheri, who had infiltrated ITP. Meanwhile, Caruso acquires help from David, a Mossad agent who was also investigating Yacoby's death.

When the lie detector test does not work, Ethan is forced to flee the country with the flash drive by offering classified intelligence to Venezuela in exchange for safe passage. He was then kept in a safe house in Panama; Caruso finds this out from David. His boss from The Campus, Gerry Hendley, sends director of transportation Adara Sherman to accompany him in surveilling the safehouse. However, the Russian government had taken interest in Ross through their connections in Venezuela, and try to snatch him. Caruso and Sherman dispatch the GRU forces, but Ross, Bertoli and Mobasheri escape.

With David's help, Caruso learns that Ross is on Geneva, Switzerland, the global headquarters of the ITP; he as well as FBI agents proceed there to apprehend the rogue staffer. Bertoli had arranged a press conference where Ross can go public about the top secret files that he had stolen from the NSC servers. However, the two become suspicious of Mobasheri's true intentions. With the FBI agents approaching, he abducts Ross and Bertoli, intending to escape to Libya; the ITP leader is later killed. Caruso chases them to a chalet in the Alps.

Caruso sees Ross being tortured by Mobasheri for the password to the data scrape. Outnumbered, he decides to kill him using a sniper rifle; the Iranian and his henchmen later flee the scene with the flash drive. Caruso manages to contact the local CIA deputy station chief in order to dispatch an infantry platoon training nearby to block Mobasheri's escape. Caruso then apprehends Mobasheri and secures the data scrape.

== Development ==
On October 1, 2013, author and creator of the Jack Ryan series Tom Clancy died. His last novel, co-authored with Mark Greaney, Command Authority, was published posthumously on December 3, 2013.

In keeping with the tradition of developing franchises from bestselling novelists like Ian Fleming and Robert Ludlum after their deaths, Clancy's lawyer, J. Thompson Webb, later signed agreements with publishing company G.P. Putnam's Sons continuing the Jack Ryan book franchise. Greaney was chosen to write the first novel in the post-Clancy Ryanverse; Putnam spokeswoman Alexis Welby said that "Greaney's gift is that he's able to hit the trifecta of what makes a great Clancy book: Tom's terrific characters, really well-done action scenes and that over-the-horizon prescience about world events that characterized Tom's books."

== Reception ==
=== Commercial ===
Support and Defend debuted at number three on the Hardcover Fiction category of the New York Times bestseller list, as well as number five on the Combined Print & E-Book Fiction category of the same list, for the week of August 10, 2014.

=== Critical ===
The book received generally positive reviews. Publishers Weekly noted that "Clancy readers will hardly notice that Tom is no longer with us." Kirkus Reviews praised the book as "another timely, techno-geeky thriller" and added that "It’s by-the-numbers stuff, with the requisite villainy, continent-hopping, décolletage, neat tools and cliffhangers. But, of course, that’s just what Clancy’s fans read him for, and Greaney carries on that entertaining tradition seamlessly."
