= Point of Contact (novel) =

2017 novel by Mike Maden

- Author: Mike Maden
- Audio read by: Scott Brick
- Language: English
- Series: Jack Ryan Jr.
- Release number: 4
- Genre: Techno-thriller
- Publisher: G.P. Putnam's Sons
- Publication date: June 13, 2017
- Publication place: United States
- Media type: Print (Hardcover, Paperback), Audio, eBook
- Pages: 485
- ISBN: 9780735215863
- Preceded by: Duty and Honor
- Followed by: Line of Sight

Point of Contact (stylized as Tom Clancy Point of Contact, Tom Clancy: Point of Contact or Tom Clancy's Point of Contact in the United Kingdom) is a techno-thriller novel, written by Mike Maden and released on June 13, 2017. It is his first book in the Jack Ryan Jr. series, which is part of the Ryanverse featuring characters created by Tom Clancy.

The novel depicts Ryan as he helps avert a North Korean plot to crash the Asian stock market, along with his Hendley Associates colleague Paul Brown, in Singapore. It debuted at number 3 on the New York Times bestseller list.

== Plot summary ==
American defense contractor Marin Aerospace is looking to acquire Dalfan Technologies, a Singapore-based company. However, former US senator Weston Rhodes, who is on the Marin Aerospace board of directors, is blackmailed by former Bulgarian intelligence officer and old enemy Tervel Zvezdev, who has a plan to crash the Asian stock market by driving Dalfan stock points down and then gain profit for themselves. After giving in to the plot, Rhodes is given a flash drive with a computer virus that will be installed into the Dalfan computer server in Singapore, unaware that the North Koreans had made the virus and, through General Administrative Services Directorate Deputy Ri Kwan Ju, enlisted Zvezdev's help.

To carry out this plan, Rhodes asks his former Senate colleague and Hendley Associates head Gerry Hendley to facilitate a week-long, third party audit into Dalfan Technologies on behalf of Marin Aerospace to make sure that there are no problems among both parties leading up to the impending merger. He personally selects forensic accountant Paul Brown and financial analyst Jack Ryan, Jr. to oversee the audit. Having known Brown as a colleague from the Central Intelligence Agency years ago, he then secretly entrusts the accountant with planting the flash drive in the Dalfan computer network, under the pretense of him being assigned by the CIA to find out whether China had inserted malware into the system.

Upon arriving in Singapore, Jack and Paul are met by the Fairchild family, who own Dalfan Technologies: Dr. Gordon Fairchild and his two children, Lian and Yong. Lian Fairchild, who is chief of security for the company, personally assists them in touring the country as well as the Dalfan headquarters as part of the audit. Jack is introduced to the company’s technological advances in the fields of virtual reality, quantum cryptography, and especially digital surveillance in the form of Dalfan’s flagship program, the Steady Stare drone, which “time travels” through 24/7 video monitoring of Singapore in order to pinpoint the circumstances behind a particular crime.

Meanwhile, Paul checks through the company’s ledgers for any signs of fraud. Finding Rhodes’s job extremely difficult due to the high security of the Dalfan building, he seeks the aid of Hendley Associates’s head of IT Gavin Biery to write a piece of software that will allow the CIA flash drive to be installed into a Dalfan computer by “snatching” the company server’s encryption code and inserting it into the mentioned drive without incident. To give a degree of urgency, Paul makes up a story of Jack having an affair with a Chinese spy (implied to be Lian).

As the audit progresses, Jack and Paul stumble upon a suspicious pattern of transactions to a Shanghai importer, where Dalfan has been selling disposable mobile phones to at a reduced rate. With the aid of the Steady Stare drone, Jack checks out the Dalfan warehouse where the mobile phones are being kept, only to be aggressively stopped and turned away by the guards. Later convinced by Paul's discovery of the mysterious deletion of the file containing the transactions, he sneaks in back there later that night, but he finds nothing but DVD players. He is then attacked by the stationed Chinese guards, but manages to kill them. He then deduces that the place has already been cleaned up and that he was ambushed. Unbeknownst to him, Yong Fairchild, who is Dalfan’s chief financial officer, and his girlfriend Meili, who is a Chinese spy, orchestrated the attempted murder in order to silence him.

The next day, Paul is about to install the flash drive when he becomes convinced that it is embedded with a computer virus after examining its lines of code. He then disappears with the flash drive in order to evade possible capture from assassins who may be hunting for him now that he did not install the virus. Jack then looks for him, enlisting Biery’s help and finding out about his secret correspondence with Paul in the process. He later finds Paul in a brothel just as a pair of assassins sent by Zvezdev arrive to kill him. After killing the two hitmen, Jack is then told by Paul about the flash drive. They return to their guesthouse, only to find Lian waiting for them. She tells Jack that her brother Yong and his girlfriend had already fled to China in order to escape the incoming tropical storm that is set to hit Singapore. However, they find themselves attacked, and Paul is then abducted.

Jack pinpoints the Dalfan headquarters as the location where Paul is being held and where his abductors will force him to install the flash drive. He and Lian proceed there, kill the men holding Paul, and then free him. He had given up the password to the drive after being tortured, and as a result, the virus has been uploaded into the network and is set to create chaos when the stock markets open the next day. Because cell service is down in Singapore due to the tropical storm, deterring any contact to the U.S. embassy, Jack, Paul, and Lian decide to drive all the way to the neighboring country of Malaysia in order to try to stop the virus. Upon arriving in Malaysia in the middle of the heavy rains, the trio are attacked by a group of North Koreans sent by Deputy Ri to eliminate them. Paul sacrifices himself by staying behind and dispatching them, leaving Jack and Lian to escape. He is then killed in the ensuing gunfight.

Days later, Rhodes is arrested for conspiring to crash the stock market. Paul is given a proper burial in his hometown in the state of Iowa, where Jack as well as his father, President Ryan, and members of the intelligence community attend. A flashback establishes that Paul was honored in the CIA for saving Rhodes from an ambush by Zvezdev in Sofia, Bulgaria in 1985, where he had seemingly killed the Bulgarian intelligence officer. Meanwhile, Zvezdev was implied to have been killed by the North Koreans for failing to do his job, and his remains were then stuffed in a kimchi jar.

== Characters ==
=== United States government ===
- Jack Ryan: President of the United States
- Scott Adler: Secretary of state
- Mary Pat Foley: Director of national intelligence
- Robert Burgess: Secretary of defense
- Jay Canfield: Director of the Central Intelligence Agency
- Arnold Van Damm: President Ryan's chief of staff

=== The Campus ===
- Gerry Hendley: Director of The Campus and Hendley Associates
- John Clark: Director of operations
- Domingo "Ding" Chavez: Senior operations officer
- Dominic "Dom" Caruso: Operations officer
- Jack Ryan, Jr.: Operations officer / senior analyst
- Gavin Biery: Director of information technology
- Adara Sherman: Operations officer
- Bartosz "Midas" Jankowski: Operations officer

=== Other characters ===
- Paul Brown: Forensic accountant, Hendley Associates
- Weston Rhodes: Ex-U.S. senator; board member, Marin Aerospace
- Dr. Gordon Fairchild: Chief executive officer, Dalfan Technologies
- Lian Fairchild: Head of security, Dalfan Technologies (Gordon Fairchild's daughter)
- Yong Fairchild: Chief financial officer, Dalfan Technologies (Gordon Fairchild's son)
- Choi Ha-guk: Chairman, Democratic People's Republic of Korea (DPRK)
- Ri Kwan-ju: Deputy, General Administrative Services Directorate, DPRK
- Tervel Zvezdev: Former member, Bulgarian Committee for State Security (CSS)

== Development ==
On February 20, 2017, The Real Book Spy announced that principal authors in the Tom Clancy universe, Mark Greaney and Grant Blackwood are leaving the franchise. Greaney was then replaced by Marc Cameron for the fall-release Jack Ryan novels, while Blackwood was replaced by Maden for the summer-release Jack Ryan Jr. novels. Speaking of Maden's inclusion into the franchise, long-time Tom Clancy editor Tom Colgan stated: “I had read and loved Mike Maden’s Troy Pearce series, so he was the first person I thought of for the Jack Jr. books and I have to say that it’s been a blast working with him on Tom Clancy Point of Contact.”

Prior to Point of Contact, Maden was well-known for the Drone series of techno thrillers, and is a fan of Clancy from reading The Hunt for Red October in graduate school. He elaborated that "Tom Clancy’s genius was to bring current technology into stories in a powerful and entertaining way, but he also created some of the most compelling characters in the genre—a genre he essentially invented. No one can ever replace him or even imitate him."

Unlike Clancy, who goes to countries to research for his novels, Maden relied on the Internet, or "interwebs", for information into the genuine technologies featured in Point of Contact.

== Reception ==
=== Commercial ===
Point of Contact debuted at number three on the Combined Print and E-Book Fiction and Hardcover Fiction categories of the New York Times bestseller list for the week of July 2, 2017, making it Maden's first and highest charting release in the list.

=== Critical ===
The book received generally positive reviews. Publishers Weekly praised it as a "taut, exciting thriller" and that "Clancy fans can rest assured that the state of the franchise is strong." In a featured review, thriller novel reviewer The Real Book Spy said that "After three novels from Grant Blackwood, Mike Maden takes over the Jack Ryan Junior franchise and mixes nail-biting suspense with hard-hitting action to deliver a blockbuster hit that Clancy fans will love."
