= Seek =

Seek may refer to:

- Disk seek, in which the read head of a magnetic disk repositions itself
- Goal seeking
- Job seeking
- Rent seeking
- Seek Limited, an Australian recruitment website
- SEEK (conference), a Catholic convention
- CUNY SEEK, City University of New York program
- Seek, a mobile app made by iNaturalist
- Seek: Reports from the Edges of America & Beyond
- Seeking.com, an American online dating service
- Seek (NCIS), an episode of the TV series NCIS
- Seek, a fictional character from Doors

== See also ==
- Hide and Seek (disambiguation)
- Seek and Destroy (disambiguation)
- Sikh, an adherent of Sikhism
- fseek, C programming language file operation
