= Mike Maden =

American writer

- Born: 1960 (age 65–66); Antioch, California, U.S.
- Education: University of California, Davis
- Occupation: Writer
- Writing career
- Years active: 2013–present
- Genres: Techno-thriller; Spy fiction; Crime fiction; Realistic fiction
- Notable works: Tom Clancy: Point of Contact; Drone
- Website: mikemaden.com

Mike Maden (born 1960) is an American novelist. He is known for the Jack Ryan Jr. novels, which are part of the Ryanverse based on characters created by Tom Clancy, as well as for his own Drone series of techno-thrillers.

== Early life ==
Maden was born and raised in California’s San Joaquin Valley, where he later worked in the food packaging department for years. He graduated from the University of California, Davis with a doctorate degree in political science, majoring in international relations and comparative politics.

Maden lived in Dallas, Texas from 1995 to 2014, where he worked for Common Grace Ministries. He served as a political consultant and campaign manager in state and national elections, and also hosted his own local weekly radio show for a year.

Maden also worked as a screenwriter and producer for TV shows and films in Hollywood. His works included the web TV series Pink (2007–2009), which won a Streamy Award, Continuum (2012), and the movie Sunny in the Dark (2015).

== Career ==
Maden made his literary debut with Drone in 2014, which was initially the outcome of a challenge posed to him by his friends who are authors. A techno-thriller featuring protagonist Troy Pearce, its relative national success spawned three more sequels: Blue Warrior (2015), Drone Command (2015), and Drone Threat (2016).

Maden is a Tom Clancy fan from reading The Hunt for Red October back in graduate school. He elaborated that "Tom Clancy’s genius was to bring current technology into stories in a powerful and entertaining way, but he also created some of the most compelling characters in the genre—a genre he essentially invented. No one can ever replace him or even imitate him." On February 20, 2017, The Real Book Spy announced that Grant Blackwood and Mark Greaney are exiting the Tom Clancy franchise. Blackwood was replaced by Maden for the Jack Ryan Jr. novels slated for release in the summer. Speaking of Maden's inclusion into the franchise, longtime Clancy editor Tom Colgan, who is also Maden's editor, stated: “I had read and loved Mike Maden’s Troy Pearce series, so he was the first person I thought of for the Jack Jr. books and I have to say that it’s been a blast working with him on Tom Clancy Point of Contact."

Speaking about his inclusion into the Clancy universe, Maden remarked: "It was probably the greatest literary moment of my life. It was also the most terrifying, because basically I was told, 'Feel free to add to the canon — just don't mess it up.'" His first contribution to the series, Tom Clancy: Point of Contact (2017), debuted at number three on the New York Times bestseller list, making it his first and highest charting work on the list. It was followed by three more sequels. In 2021, Maden was succeeded by Don Bentley as author of the Jack Ryan Jr. novels.

Maden has also written books for Clive Cussler's Oregon Files series, with four books as of 2025.

== Bibliography ==
=== Troy Pearce / Drone series ===
- Drone (2013)
- Blue Warrior (2014)
- Drone Command (2015)
- Drone Threat (2016)

=== Jack Ryan Jr. series ===
Featuring characters created by Tom Clancy

- Tom Clancy: Point of Contact (2017)
- Tom Clancy: Line of Sight (2018)
- Tom Clancy: Enemy Contact (2019)
- Tom Clancy: Firing Point (2020)

=== The Oregon Files ===
Featuring characters created by Clive Cussler

- Clive Cussler’s Hellburner (2022)
- Clive Cussler's Fire Strike (2023)
- Clive Cussler's Ghost Soldier (2024)
- Clive Cussler's Quantum Tempest (2025)

== Filmography ==
=== Television ===
==== Writer ====
- Pink (2007–2009)
- Exposed (2010)
- Raspberry Jam (2011 short)
- Continuum (2012)
- Quantum Dawn (2018)

==== Producer ====
- Quantum Dawn (2018)

=== Film ===
==== Writer ====
- Sunny in the Dark (2015)
