= Against All Enemies (novel) =

2011 thriller novel by Tom Clancy

- Author: Tom Clancy with Peter Telep
- Audio read by: Steven Weber
- Language: English
- Genre: Spy fiction; Techno-thriller; Military fiction
- Publisher: G.P. Putnam's Sons
- Publication date: June 14, 2011
- Publication place: United States
- Media type: Print (Hardcover, Paperback), Audio, eBook
- Pages: 768
- ISBN: 978-0-399-15730-1

Against All Enemies is a spy thriller novel, written by Tom Clancy and co-authored with Peter Telep, and published on June 14, 2011. While it is set in the Ryanverse, it features a new character, ex-Navy SEAL and CIA paramilitary operations officer Max Moore, as he is tasked by a government joint task force to bring down a Mexican drug cartel and prevent Taliban terrorists from carrying out attacks in the United States. The book debuted at number one on the New York Times bestseller list.

A sequel, Search and Destroy, was scheduled to be released on July 5, 2012, but it was cancelled.

== Plot ==
In Pakistan, CIA Special Activities Division (SAD) officer and former Navy SEAL Max Moore cultivates an asset in the form of Colonel Saadat Khodai of the Pakistan Army, who has information about the Taliban’s connection with his own colleagues in the Pakistani armed forces. As Moore brings him to a hotel in Islamabad to be questioned by CIA officers, the Taliban assassinates Khodai by blowing up the place, killing Moore’s colleagues in the process. After a fruitless investigation into the incident, Moore is later recalled to the United States to take part in a joint task force aimed at bringing down the Juárez drug cartel in Mexico and Colombia, which involves playing them off against the rival Sinaloa cartel by discreetly helping the latter.

While interacting with the Sinaloa Cartel disguised as a businessman, Moore finds out that the secret leader of the Juárez Cartel is billionaire Jorge Rojas. Along with cartel leader Ernesto Zuñiga, he plans to kidnap Rojas’s son Miguel and girlfriend Sonia, who are taking a vacation in the town of San Cristobal de las Casas, Mexico, as well as Dante Corrales, one of their bodyguards who is identified as a major player in the cartel. However, Guatemalan death squad Buitres Justicieros (Avenging Vultures), who had a blood feud with Corrales, abducts the couple as well as Corrales and the other bodyguards. Moore finds out that Sonia, whose real name is Olivia Montello, is a deep cover CIA agent, while Corrales barely escapes. Moore, along with a DEA agent embedded in the cartel as a sicario and his immediate boss, follow the couple and the Guatemalans to the nearby town of San Juan Chamula and rescue them. Miguel and Sonia are later freed by Moore.

After hiding from the Juárez Cartel and his immediate boss Fernando Castillo in particular, Corrales turns himself in to Zuñiga after surviving an attack that kills his girlfriend. From his ranch house in Ciudad Juárez, Zuñiga contacts Moore, who later extracts Corrales from a bloody shootout with sicarios sent by Castillo where Zuñiga is killed. Corrales then provides the joint task force with evidence of Rojas's association with the Juárez Cartel. Recognizing the difficulty of turning in Rojas due to his connections with the Mexican government, the Mexican Special Forces were tasked by the joint task force with raiding his mansion in Cuernavaca and arresting him. During the raid, Moore shoots Rojas dead. Olivia was later extracted by her CIA superiors.

Meanwhile, Taliban terrorists led by Mullah Abdul Samad approach the Juárez Cartel and try to enlist their help in smuggling them across the Mexico–United States border in order to carry out attacks in the north. When Rojas refuses his offer due to the expected loss in drug profits, Samad and his team decide to go through the border themselves through a smuggling tunnel owned by the Juárez Cartel between Mexicali, Baja California, and Calexico, California, murdering the tunnel engineer and a drug mule (who is an asset of one of Moore's partners in the joint task force) in the process. They plan to carry out coordinated attacks on six planes in six cities across the United States using man-portable surface-to-air missiles. While attacks were largely prevented in San Diego, California, and four other cities, Samad coordinates the attack in Los Angeles, killing hundreds.

With the U.S. government out for blood, Moore later finds out Samad's whereabouts from his asset back in Pakistan, which is in a safehouse owned by the Sinaloa Cartel in Belize. Along with task force leader Henry Towers and a contingent of British Royal Marines training nearby, Moore captures him. Two weeks later, as he is waiting for a date with Olivia, Moore is approached by The Campus operative Dominic Caruso, who attempts to recruit him into the organization but later postpones his offer.

== Characters ==
=== Task Force Juarez ===
- Maxwell Steven Moore: Special Activities Division (SAD) officer, Central Intelligence Agency; former SEAL Team Six member
- Henry Towers: United States Border Patrol agent and head of Task Force Juarez
- Michael Ansara: Federal Bureau of Investigation special agent
- Gloria Vega: CIA agent embedded with the Mexican Federal Police as inspector
- Thomas "Flexxx" Fitzpatrick: Drug Enforcement Administration agent infiltrating the Sinaloa Cartel as a sicario

=== Mexico and Colombia ===
- Jorge Rojas: Mexican billionaire and secret leader of the Juárez Cartel
- Miguel Rojas: Jorge's son
- Sonia Batista / Olivia Montello: Miguel's girlfriend, CIA deep cover agent
- Dante Corrales: Leader of Los Caballeros (The Gentlemen), Juárez Cartel's enforcer gang
- Fernando Castillo: Rojas's chief of security
- Ernesto Zuñiga (El Matador): Leader of the Sinaloa Cartel
- Alberto Gómez: Mexican Federal Police inspector in the payroll of Juárez Cartel
- Captain Salou: Former Guatemalan Special Forces member and mercenary for Buitres Justicieros
- Rueben Everson: Juárez Cartel drug mule and Ansara’s informant
- Pedro Romero: Engineer in charge of building a tunnel beneath the Mexicali-Calexico area for the Juárez Cartel

=== Afghanistan ===
- Mullah Abdul Samad: Punjabi Taliban terrorist
- Mullah Omar Rahmani: Samad's patron
- Bobby Gallagher: Afghan-born CIA agent gone rogue and working for the Taliban
- Israr Rana: Pakistani high school student and Moore's asset
- Nek Wazir: Chairman of the North Waziristan shura and Moore's asset
- Saadat Khodai: Pakistan Army colonel and Moore's asset

== Release ==
A book trailer for Against All Enemies was released by Putnam Books online on May 27, 2011.

== Reception ==
=== Commercial ===
The book debuted at number one on the Hardcover Fiction category of the New York Times bestseller list for the week of July 3, 2011. It debuted at number two on the Combined Print and E-Book Fiction category of the same list. In addition, it entered the USA Today's Best-Selling Books list at number two on June 23, 2011.

A year later, the mass-market paperback edition peaked at number two for three consecutive weeks on the New York Times bestseller list.

=== Critical ===
The book received positive reviews. The Los Angeles Times praised the novel as being "rivalled only by the Yellow Pages in size and chock full of espionage and treachery". The Washington Times lauded Clancy's authenticity as well as introducing a new character "to replace the well-worn Jack Ryan".
