= Under Fire (Blackwood novel) =

2015 novel by Grant Blackwood

- Author: Grant Blackwood
- Audio read by: Scott Brick
- Language: English
- Series: Jack Ryan Jr.
- Release number: 2
- Genre: Political thriller
- Publisher: G.P. Putnam's Sons
- Publication date: June 16, 2015
- Publication place: United States
- Media type: Print (Hardcover, Paperback), Audio, eBook
- Pages: 544
- ISBN: 9780425283189
- Preceded by: The Teeth of the Tiger
- Followed by: Duty and Honor

Under Fire (stylized as Tom Clancy Under Fire, Tom Clancy: Under Fire, or Tom Clancy's Under Fire in the United Kingdom) is a techno-thriller novel, written by Grant Blackwood and released on June 16, 2015. It is the second book in the Jack Ryan Jr. series, which is part of the Ryanverse featuring characters created by Tom Clancy, as well as Blackwood's first solo contribution to the franchise.

In the novel, Ryan must choose between his country and his mysterious friend Seth Gregory, who is involved in Dagestan's struggle for independence from the Russian Federation. The book debuted at number four on the New York Times bestseller list.

== Plot summary ==
While on a routine intelligence gathering trip for The Campus in Tehran, Iran, Jack Ryan, Jr. visits his old college friend Seth Gregory for lunch. After their conversation, Gregory leaves with a cryptic comment that “there are steaks in the freezer.” The next day, Jack is met by Raymond Wellesley of British intelligence and Matthew Spellman, his American counterpart, who tell him that Seth, who works with them on an intelligence operation, had gone rogue; they warn him to stay away from his old friend. This piques Jack's interest.

Jack later goes to Seth's apartment, but is later abducted by an unknown group of men. He manages to escape just as a mysterious woman pulls up in a car to fetch him away from his abductors. The woman introduces herself as Ysabel Kashani, an Iranian national who is also Gregory's college friend. They return to his apartment and retrieve an old document from a safe, which combination was found with “steaks in the freezer”.

Jack and Ysabel later go to Azerbaijan, where they are met by Gregory and Spellman. Jack discovers that his old friend is an agent for the Central Intelligence Agency, and that his father, Paul, was a legend in the CIA until he was branded as a traitor and committed suicide. He further finds out that Seth is taking part in an intelligence operation with Wellesley and Spellman, which is to facilitate a coup in Dagestan, and that the document he and Ysabel retrieved has coordinates for internet hubs to be used during the coup (Gregory's father had originally written the document).

However, Dagestani interior minister Rebaz Medzhid, who is being lined up to be Dagestan's president, refuses to participate unless his daughter Aminat, who has been kidnapped, is rescued. Jack agrees to extract her from her captors in Scotland, and later helps discredit a smear story planted by the Russians against Medzhid about his involvement in atrocities against Dagestanis years ago by rescuing the “witness”, who is being coerced by the Russians.

Jack's boss, Gerry Hendley, sends his cousin Dominic “Dom” Caruso to help him. They later discover that Wellesley plans to sabotage the coup by using armored trucks equipped with Krasukhas that have the ability to jam electronic signals coming from the internet hubs that are to be used in the coup. In addition, he had also arranged for the kidnappings of Aminat and the “witness” to the Russian smear story. Jack and Dom later destroy the Krasukhas.

Later, Russian President Valeri Volodin deploys border troops to Makhachkala in an effort to stop the coup. Jack sniffs out a mole in Medzhid's security detail; Seth is killed in the resulting altercation with the mole, who is one of Medzhid's bodyguards. Meanwhile, Medzhid makes a last-ditch effort to stop the Russian troops by appealing to their leader, suggesting that he is being manipulated by Volodin and telling him to go back and report no disturbance in Makhachkala. The colonel agrees and the standoff is averted.

Jack, Dom and Ysabel later find out that Wellesley had misused government funds and was acting on behalf of the Russians. After being reported by the trio to the British, Wellesley is arrested by British agents as he tries to escape Azerbaijan.

== Characters ==
- Jack Ryan, Jr.: Operations officer, The Campus
- Seth Gregory: Operations officer, Central Intelligence Agency (CIA)
- Raymond Wellesley: Operations officer, Secret Intelligence Service (MI6)
- Matthew Spellman: Operations officer, CIA
- Ysabel Kashani: Iranian national, later Jack's love interest
- Rebaz Medzhid: Dagestan minister of internal affairs
- Dominic “Dom” Caruso: Operations officer, The Campus
- Gavin Biery: Director of information technology, The Campus
- Oleg Pechkin: Operations officer, Foreign Intelligence Service. Killed by Ryan.
- Pavel Koikov: Sergeant who served under Medzhid, "witness" to Medzhid's alleged involvement in the 1999 Almak massacre
- Aminat Medzhid: Rebaz's daughter. Abducted by Helen, under orders from Wellesley.
- Helen: Aminat's kidnapper. Killed by Ryan.
- Dobromir: Helen's financier for her "professional" kidnappings
- Colonel Lobanov: Leader of the Russian garrison troops in Makhachkala
- Anton: Medzhid's bodyguard. Wrongly framed as the mole working for Pechkin, gunned down.
- Vasim: Medzhid's bodyguard. Killed Gregory after being exposed as the mole working for Pechkin, killed by Ryan afterwards.

== Reception ==
=== Commercial ===
Under Fire debuted at number four at both the Combined E-Book & Print Fiction and the Hardcover Fiction categories of the New York Times bestseller list for the week of July 5, 2015. In addition, it debuted at number five at the USA Today Best Selling Books list for the week of June 25, 2015.

=== Critical ===
The book received generally positive reviews. Publishers Weekly praised Blackwood, saying that "Clancy fans will be pleased to discover that in Blackwood's more than capable hands, Jack remains the all-American hero they remember." Kirkus Reviews hailed the novel as "A complex international adventure that's less military hardware–centric than Clancy solo, but Blackwood uses 'notional', which fans will know is homage to the maestro."
