= Search and Destroy (disambiguation) =

Search and destroy is a military strategy that became a notorious element of the Vietnam War.

Search and Destroy or Seek and Destroy may also refer to:

== Military ==
- Sense and Destroy ARMor or Seek and Destroy ARMor, a U.S. submunition capable of searching for and destroying tanks
- "Seek and Destroy", the motto of No. 41 Squadron RAF

== Games ==
- Search & Destroy: Tactical Combat Vietnam 1965-1966, a 1975 board wargame
- Seek and Destroy (1996 video game), a game developed by Safari Software and published by Epic Megagames
- Seek and Destroy (2002 video game), an action game developed by Takara

== Music ==
- "Search and Destroy" (The Stooges song), 1973, notably covered by the Red Hot Chili Peppers and Skunk Anansie
- "Search and Destroy" (Thirty Seconds to Mars song), 2009
- "Seek & Destroy", a 1983 song by Metallica from the album Kill 'Em All, with a chorus lyric of "Searching - seek and destroy."
- "Seek and Destroy", a 1989 song by Geto Boys from Grip It! On That Other Level
- "Seek and Destroy", a 2006 song by Kasabian from Empire
- "Search & Destroy", a 1995 song by KMFDM from Nihil
- "Seek and Destroy", a 1983 song by Raven from All for One
- "Seek & Destroy", a 2022 song by SZA from SOS

== Other uses ==
- Search and Destroy (novel), a spy novel by Tom Clancy with Peter Telep
- Search and Destroy (manga), a Japanese manga series by Atsushi Kaneko
- Search & Destroy (punk zine), a zine published by V. Vale from 1977 to 1979 and succeeded by RE/Search
- Search and Destroy (1979 film), a 1979 Canuxploitation film
- Search and Destroy (1995 film), a film by David Salle and starring Dennis Hopper
  - Search and Destroy, a play by Howard Korder and the basis for the film
- Search and Destroy (Person of Interest), a 2015 episode of Person of Interest
- "Seek and Destroy" (Captain Scarlet), a 1968 episode of Captain Scarlet and the Mysterons
- Spybot – Search & Destroy, a spyware and adware removal program for Microsoft Windows systems

== See also ==
- "Find and Destroy", an episode of Danger Man
