= Target Acquired =

2021 novel by Don Bentley

- Author: Don Bentley
- Audio read by: Scott Brick
- Language: English
- Series: Jack Ryan Jr.
- Release number: 8
- Genre: Techno-thriller; Spy fiction; Military fiction; Realistic fiction
- Publisher: G.P. Putnam's Sons
- Publication date: June 8, 2021
- Publication place: United States
- Media type: Print (Hardcover), Audio, eBook
- Pages: 432
- ISBN: 9780593188132
- Preceded by: Firing Point
- Followed by: Zero Hour

Target Acquired (stylized as Tom Clancy Target Acquired, Tom Clancy: Target Acquired, or Tom Clancy's Target Acquired in the United Kingdom) is a techno-thriller novel, written by Don Bentley and released on June 8, 2021. It is his first book in the Jack Ryan Jr. series, which is part of the Ryanverse featuring characters created by Tom Clancy.

In the novel, Jack stumbles into an Iranian plot to destroy Israel after saving a woman and her child from an attempted murder. It debuted at number three on the New York Times bestseller list.

== Plot summary ==
Jack Ryan, Jr. participates in a CIA asset-validation exercise in Tel Aviv, Israel as a favor to his mentor and fellow Campus operative Domingo "Ding" Chavez, where he prevents a Chinese MSS operative from stabbing a mysterious woman. Finding himself under suspicion as an unsanctioned intelligence officer working on Israeli soil, Jack is warned by the Shin Bet agents Tal Levy and Dudu to leave the country.

However, Jack decides to return a Captain America action figure owned by the woman's autistic son, which he had dropped during the attempted stabbing. He encounters the same assassin as he is about to finish the job on a nearby beach and fights him before the Chinese is picked up by a Zodiac. The mysterious woman introduces herself to Jack as Becka Schweigart and her son as Tommy. Levy and Dudu catch up to them and escort them to the airport, but they are ambushed by a group of Russian mercenaries who kidnap Becka and Tommy and kill Tal.

Jack goes to a CIA safehouse, where he meets case officer Peter Beltz, an old friend of Chavez who had initiated the asset-validation exercise. Peter reveals that the exercise was a cover for a surveillance operation on Becka, a scientist who had discovered radar-defeating technology which the Chinese government wanted to acquire. She had come to Israel for an academic conference seeking investors, one of them being Darien Moradi, an Iranian intelligence agent posing as an American venture capitalist. Peter had placed a tracking beacon inside Tommy's Captain America action figure, now out of range following their abduction.

Jack enlists Shin Bet's help in tracking down Becka and her son. He joins Dudu and Sayeret Matkal commandos as they make a covert insertion into Beirut, Lebanon, the beacon's last location. They are ambushed by a Hezbollah patrol, forcing Jack to enter the city alone. Accompanied by a Mossad asset, Jack tracks down the beacon's location before he is captured by Russian mercenary Katerina Sidorova, who is working with Darien and Quds Force commander General Farhad Ahmadi. Jack is forced to reveal his identity as the son of U.S. President Jack Ryan as Ahmadi orders his photo taken to provoke his father into a military response; Becka and her son were then moved to an undisclosed location.

After a brief escape attempt, Jack is delivered by Katerina and Darien to a Shia apocalyptic cult in Syria, which had been stockpiling weapons and missiles in a compound funded by General Ahmadi. Jack survives an attempt by the cultists to crucify him as the Green Berets begin to destroy their compound with laser-guided bombs, but not before the cultists launch four cruise missiles headed for Tel Aviv, evading Israel's Iron Dome air defense system with Becka's technology. However, a U.S. Air Force F-35 pilot diverts the missiles' path into the nearby Mediterranean Sea, sacrificing herself in the process.

Meanwhile, Jack pursues Katerina and Darien in the middle of a battle between the Green Berets and the remaining cultists. He eventually catches up to them, incapacitating the Russian and capturing the Iranian agent, who gives up Becka and Tommy's location. They are subsequently rescued in a joint operation by Sayeret Matkal commandos and SEAL Team Six. Jack reunites with them and gifts Tommy a new Captain America action figure.

== Characters ==
=== United States government ===
- Jack Ryan: President of the United States
- Mary Pat Foley: Director of national intelligence

=== The Campus ===
- John Clark: Director of operations
- Domingo "Ding" Chavez: Assistant director of operations
- Gavin Biery: Director of information technology
- Jack Ryan, Jr.: Operations officer / senior analyst
- Lisanne Robertson: Former director of transportation

=== Operational Detachment Alpha (ODA) 555 ===
- Captain Alex Brown
- Master Sergeant Cary Marks
- Sergeant First Class Jad Mustafa
- Doug "Crumdog" Crum: Medic
- Sergeant First Class Brian Martin
- Staff Sergeant Greg Glass
- Staff Sergeant Jeff Mishler

=== Shin Bet officers ===
- Tal Levy
- Dudu

=== Other characters ===
- Dr. Cathy Ryan: First Lady of the United States
- General Farhad Ahmadi: Iranian Quds Force
- Darien Moradi: Iranian Ministry of Intelligence and Security (MOIS)
- Katerina Sidorova: Wagner Group
- Peter Beltz: CIA case officer
- Dr. Rebecka Schweigart: American scientist
- Tommy Schweigart: Son of Dr. Schweigart
- Captain Natalie "Daisy" Smith: Air Force F-35 pilot

== Reception ==
=== Commercial ===
The book debuted at number three on the Combined Print and E-Book Fiction category of the New York Times bestseller list for the week of June 27, 2021, as well as number six on the Hardcover Fiction category of the same list. It charted at number four on the Mass Market Books category of the same list in May 2022.

=== Critical ===
Publishers Weekly pointed out the book's climax as "the action builds to a terrific, multiple point-of-view battle scene" while praising Bentley as a "worthy successor" to Clancy. Kirkus Reviews praised the book as "fast, furious Clancy fare, fun even though you already know who wins".
