= Firing Point =

2020 novel by Mike Maden

- Author: Mike Maden
- Audio read by: Scott Brick
- Language: English
- Series: Jack Ryan Jr.
- Release number: 7
- Genre: Techno-thriller; Spy fiction; Realistic fiction
- Publisher: G.P. Putnam's Sons
- Publication date: June 9, 2020
- Publication place: United States
- Media type: Print (Hardcover), Audio, eBook
- Pages: 468
- ISBN: 9780593188064
- Preceded by: Enemy Contact
- Followed by: Target Acquired

Firing Point (stylized as Tom Clancy Firing Point, Tom Clancy: Firing Point, or Tom Clancy's Firing Point in the United Kingdom) is a techno-thriller novel, written by Mike Maden and released on June 9, 2020. It is his fourth and final book in the Jack Ryan Jr. series, which is part of the Ryanverse featuring characters created by Tom Clancy.

In the novel, Ryan investigates an old friend's death while vacationing in Barcelona, Spain. It debuted at number three on the New York Times bestseller list.

== Plot summary ==
Jack Ryan, Jr. takes a vacation in Barcelona, Spain after taking part in a mission with the Campus in South Korea. He runs into his former college classmate Renée Moore in a restaurant, and they briefly catch up. The two agree to meet up later that night, and Jack leaves the restaurant moments before a suicide bomber blows up the place, killing everyone inside. Ryan manages to catch up to his dying friend, who utters the word “Sammler” before succumbing to her wounds.

Jack meets Spanish intelligence (CNI) agent Laia Brossa, who probes him for information on the suicide attack. Brigada Catalan, an activist organization demanding Catalan independence from Spain, had taken responsibility. However, Jack is not convinced, but agrees to help Brossa with the investigation.

Meanwhile, U.S. President Jack Ryan receives reports of commercial vessels disappearing under mysterious circumstances across the Pacific Ocean. They are leased by civilian defense contractor Buck Logan, one of Ryan’s biggest supporters. The incidents are accompanied by a threat from an unknown party demanding ransom. President Ryan suspects Russian involvement, especially in light of the country gearing up for a military exercise with China called Snow Dragon in the Bering Sea.

With the help of Campus IT director Gavin Biery, Jack investigates the circumstances behind Moore’s death, often passing information to Brossa. He finds out about Moore’s involvement with the CIA as well as data scientist Dylan Runtso, whom he had encountered moments before the suicide attack. Runtso had been working on a top secret government program codenamed RAPTURE out of the Oak Ridge National Laboratory in Oak Ridge, Tennessee. Jack’s investigation attracts the attention of Guatemalan contract killer Hector Guzman, who has been involved with the bombing at the restaurant. He places him under surveillance through his Russian colleague named Bykov. However, Jack discovers and unsuccessfully tries to capture the Russian for information.

Meanwhile, the CNI gathers information on a Brigada Catalan meeting. Brossa’s supervisor Gaspar Peña then arranges an assault with Guardia Civil. Unbeknownst to her, Bykov sabotages the operation by killing all of the activists present in the meeting, ensuring their silence. Péna is then revealed to be under Guzman’s payroll.

President Ryan pinpoints a Russian submarine to be the source of the disappearances in the Pacific Ocean. He tasks the United States Navy with sniffing the boat into the surface and then escorting it back to Russia. However, another incident occurs in the Indian Ocean, sending the United States government into a state of alert.

Brossa shares information she gathered from Jack to Peña, who then informs Guzman. In turn, he instructs Bykov with eliminating Jack, Brossa, and then Peña to tie up loose ends. Peña dies from being trapped a burning car, while the Russian follows Jack and Brossa during a crowded protest and injects a nerve agent on the latter, killing her in the process. Jack narrowly avoids getting injected and killed, and then he chases Bykov, who dies when they fight. Jack then returns home, his investigation at a premature end.

Guzman is revealed to be responsible for the disappearances of container vessels around the world, using an autonomous underwater vehicle disguised as a tiger shark. He was contracted by a man called Sammler to distract the United States from a bigger operation: siphoning RAPTURE into another program called TRIBULATION, a quantum computer designed to break into highly secure computer systems.

Sammler executes TRIBULATION, stealing five trillion dollars from major banking companies. He threatens President Ryan with covering the losses to prevent another massive theft. The president responds by not publicly revealing the financial losses as they try to figure out solutions. Sammler then orders Guzman killed and the autonomous drone destroyed to tie up loose ends.

Meanwhile, Jack, accompanied by Biery, breaks into Runtso's home near the Oak Ridge facility in Knoxville, Tennessee. They find out that Logan is actually Sammler, and that his next move is to deploy TRIBULATION and hack into Snow Dragon. Jack scrambles to inform his father as he tracks down TRIBULATION’s location to a distribution center nearby. He destroys its power source as an FBI SWAT team arrive on scene.

Logan escapes to Mexico. However, the Campus tracks him down, captures him, and turns him over alive to US SOCOM.

== Characters ==
=== The White House ===
- Jack Ryan: President of the United States
- Mary Pat Foley: Director of national intelligence
- Arnold van Damm: President Ryan's chief of staff
- Scott Adler: Secretary of state
- Admiral John Talbot: Chief of naval operations
- Dick Dellinger: U.S. Consulate (Barcelona, Spain), Public Diplomacy Section

=== The Campus ===
- Jack Ryan, Jr.: Operations officer / senior analyst
- Gavin Biery: Director of information technology
- Gerry Hendley: Director of The Campus and Hendley Associates
- John Clark: Director of operations
- Domingo "Ding" Chavez: Assistant director of operations
- Dominic "Dom" Caruso: Operations officer
- Adara Sherman: Operations officer
- Bartosz "Midas" Jankowski: Operations officer

=== Other characters ===
==== United States ====
- Buck Logan: President, White Mountain Logistics + Security
- Kate Parsons: Oak Ridge National Laboratory scientist

==== Spain ====
- Laia Brossa: Centro Nacional de Inteligencia (CNI) agent
- Gaspar Peña: CNI supervisor

== Development ==
Maden researched for the novel by traveling to Spain.

== Reception ==
=== Commercial ===
Firing Point debuted at number three at the Combined Print and E-Book Fiction category and number eight at the Hardcover Fiction category of the New York Times bestseller list for the week of June 28, 2020. It charted at number eight at the Mass Market Books category of the same list in May 2021.

=== Critical ===
Thriller novel reviewer The Real Book Spy praised the book as "fast, unflinching, and helplessly fun." On the other hand, Publishers Weekly dismissed the book as "unfocused", continuing: "Even after the main threads are pulled together and the evildoers unmasked, the criminal element and motive remain murky. Maden, a thriller pro, is capable of better." Kirkus Reviews's mixed verdict is that "It’s assembly-line Clancy: high-quality entertainment, few surprises."
