= Duty and Honor (novel) =

2016 novel by Grant Blackwood

- Author: Grant Blackwood
- Audio read by: Scott Brick
- Language: English
- Series: Jack Ryan Jr.
- Release number: 3
- Genre: Action
- Publisher: G.P. Putnam's Sons
- Publication date: June 14, 2016
- Publication place: United States
- Media type: Print (Hardcover, Paperback), Audio, eBook
- Pages: 407
- ISBN: 9781101988824
- Preceded by: Under Fire
- Followed by: Point of Contact

Duty and Honor (stylized as Tom Clancy Duty and Honor, Tom Clancy: Duty and Honor, or Tom Clancy’s Duty and Honour in the United Kingdom) is a techno-thriller novel, written by Grant Blackwood and published on June 14, 2016. It is his second and final book in the Jack Ryan Jr. series, which is part of the Ryanverse featuring characters created by Tom Clancy.

In the novel, Ryan must stop a German private contractor from unleashing false flag attacks to profit from the war on terror. It debuted at number four on the New York Times bestseller list.

== Plot summary ==
Jack Ryan Jr. is on a forced leave from The Campus after disobeying orders in his last mission. (Note: As depicted in Commander in Chief) One night outside a market in Alexandria, Virginia, he survives a mugging attack by fighting back; the wounded mugger later stumbles into an eight-wheeler truck, killing him. Jack investigates the circumstances behind the incident using clues left behind by his attacker, and is later convinced that he is being targeted for assassination when he finds out that another man similar to his description was killed a week ago.

Over the course of his investigation, Jack meets Effrem Likkel, a Belgian freelance journalist who is following up on a lead about seemingly missing French soldier René Allemand. Allemand, son of a former Marshal of France, had disappeared from his post in Ivory Coast. Effrem, however, finds out that he was kidnapped and thinks that he was brainwashed afterwards. Moreover, he reveals that Allemand and Jack’s would-be assassin, now known as Eric Schrader, had met in secret a week before the Lyon terrorist attacks, and further deduces that Allemand was duped by Schrader to carry out the attacks. Jack and Effrem later team up to aid each other in their own investigations.

The two travel to Munich, Germany and find out that Schrader is an employee of Jürgen Rostock, head of private military contractor Rostock Security Group. They find themselves attacked by Rostock’s men at every turn, but Jack and Effrem manage to thwart them. They later venture to Zurich, Switzerland, originally to surveil Rostock’s lawyer Alexander Bossard, but instead find Allemand there. They conclude that Allemand was indeed brainwashed into working for Rostock by kidnapping him and faking his death. The now-erratic Allemand, suffering from the effects of Rostock’s brainwashing, was on the run from Rostock when he finds out that Schrader was involved in the Lyon attacks.

Jack later informs Allemand’s father about his son. Hugo Allemand reveals that Rostock became deeply Islamophobic after the death of his wife at the hands of a suicide bomber in Kabul, Afghanistan in 2005, when he was a government official. He later retired from public service and formed RSG, with a mission to eliminate terrorists by “any means necessary” and outside the scope of government oversight. He had pitched his idea to the elder Allemand, who declined.

Jack, Effrem, and Allemand later go to Namibia to follow Gerhard Klugmann, Rostock’s main hacker. Jack finds out that Rostock wanted him killed because his audit for Dovestar Industrial Machinery, one of RSG’s shell companies, triggered an investigation from German financial regulatory authority BaFin; his scheduled testimony in the German court would expose Dovestar’s true purpose. Moreover, he and Effrem find out that RSG has been engaging in direct action sabotage on behalf of economic corporations in order to gain favor for funding its operations.

Later, when Allemand is informed by Jack about their investigation and Rostock's involvement, he storms out of the country and back to Zurich, intent on torturing Bossard for information about his plight. Jack chases the French mercenary to Switzerland, and coaxes him back to reality. They leave Bossard and his wife at their home and return to Namibia, where they find out that Effrem was abducted.

The two eventually save Effrem, who tells them that RSG are planning to sabotage the flow control system at Okavango Dam. Even though they capture Klugmann and kill some of the RSG mercenaries there, they fail to stop the computer virus planted by Klugmann from obstructing the dam, which claims the lives of 322 Namibian residents living nearby. Nevertheless, with Allemand rescued, Rostock was later convicted for his crimes and his company was dissolved. Invigorated by his experience handling Effrem and Allemand, Jack contacts his boss Gerry Hendley about returning to The Campus.

== Characters ==
- Jack Ryan, Jr.: The Campus operations officer
- Effrem Likkel: Belgian freelance journalist
- René Allemand: Former French soldier, RSG mercenary
- Stephan Möller: RSG mercenary. Later killed by Likkel.
- Jürgen Rostock: CEO of Rostock Security Group (RSG)
- Eric Schrader: Ryan's would-be assassin, RSG mercenary
- Peter Hahn: Eric's unwitting accomplice in Ryan's attempted murder; killed by Möller
- Belinda Hahn: Rostock's personal assistant, Peter's daughter. Rescued by Ryan and Likkel from Möller and his men.
- Gerhard Klugmann: RSG's main hacker
- Alexander Bossard: RSG's lawyer
- Hugo Allemand: Former Marshal of France, René's father

== Reception ==
=== Commercial ===
Duty and Honor debuted at number four at the Hardcover Fiction category, as well as number seven on the Combined Print & E-Book Fiction category of the New York Times bestseller list for the week of July 3, 2016.

=== Critical ===
The book received generally positive reviews. Publishers Weekly praised Blackwood, who "is adept at hewing to Clancy's overall vision while producing books that are better written than the Clancy originals." Thriller novel reviewer The Real Book Spy lauded the book's length, stating that "Blackwood nailed the pacing. The story is intriguing and entertaining, but simple enough that it’s easy to follow–which I can’t say for some of the other Jack Ryan novels."
