= Pressure Depth =

2026 novel by Jack Stewart

- Author: Jack Stewart
- Audio read by: Scott Brick
- Language: English
- Series: Jack Ryan Jr.
- Release number: 15
- Genre: Techno-thriller; Military fiction; Realistic fiction
- Publisher: G.P. Putnam's Sons
- Publication date: September 1, 2026
- Publication place: United States
- Media type: Print (hardcover), Audio, eBook
- Pages: 416
- ISBN: 9798217183166
- Preceded by: Terminal Velocity
- Followed by: Zero Point

Pressure Depth (stylized as Tom Clancy Pressure Depth or Tom Clancy: Pressure Depth) is a techno-thriller, written by Jack Stewart and published on September 1, 2026. It is his first book in the Jack Ryan Jr. series, which is part of the Ryanverse featuring characters created by Tom Clancy.

In the novel, Jack and the Campus must recover Cold War-era submersible technology near the Mariana Trench before Chinese agents acquire it. It debuted at number 13 on the New York Times bestseller list.

== Plot summary ==
Jack Ryan Jr. goes to Guam on a “white-side” assignment for Hendley Associates to investigate the sinking of the container ship Meridian Star at the Philippine Sea on behalf of an insurance company, while also looking for its cargo of radioactive cesium chloride. He hires retired U.S. Navy master diver Doug Park to supervise the dive operation into the Meridian Star wreckage. Meanwhile, a naval undersea warfare research unit (NUWC) led by master diver Carla Bennett discovers a Soviet-era undersea base named Siren near the Mariana Trench.

Director of national intelligence Mary Pat Foley learns about Siren and informs Campus director of operations John Clark, who sends operative Kendrick Moore to aid Jack in Guam. They enlist Carla’s help with secretly recovering Siren through Doug, her former mentor, using the Meridian Star expedition as cover. However, Chinese intelligence (MSS) paramilitary group Lotus Shadow, which had seized the cesium chloride aboard Meridian Star and sank the ship afterwards, intercepts their communications. They send a team to break into Doug’s hotel room and interrogate him for information on Siren. Jack, Carla and Kendrick get into a shootout with Lotus Shadow operatives as they rescue Doug. They flee the hotel and regroup at the naval base, where they learn that one of Carla’s NUWC colleagues was murdered.

Clark assigns Green Beret snipers Cary Marks and Jad Mustafa to accompany Jack and Kendrick. The four avoid an ambush from Lotus Shadow operatives and track down their research vessel Qianlan, where commander Sheng Liao launches a minisub with tactical officer Lu Han to locate Siren. Meanwhile, Clark and his deputy Domingo “Ding” Chavez track down former Soviet intelligence (KGB) colonel Alexei Morozov in Washington State, who reveals that Siren is a weapons control station for detonating five nuclear warheads capable of destroying the island of Guam and generating a tsunami.

Jack and Carla, accompanied by two Navy SDV SEALs, commence their dive operation from the motor vessel Pacific Resolve six hundred feet underwater. Liao launches a remotely operated vehicle (ROV) to disable one of Pacific Resolve’s ROVs, forcing the pressurized rescue module Falcon carrying Kendrick, Cary and Jad to manually locate the Siren’s access hatch. However, the Falcon knocks Jack off Siren and briefly traps him in a crevice. Jack and the SDV SEALs then fend off Chinese divers trying to stop the Falcon from docking into Siren. They return to the diving bell operated by Carla after one of the SEALs was wounded.

Meanwhile, Kendrick, Cary and Jad enter the control center inside Siren, too late to stop Han from arming the warheads. Jack decides to go back without a diver's umbilical connected to the diving bell to find and activate the fail-safe outside Siren, enabling Kendrick to disarm the warheads. Jack is then rescued by Carla after he passes out due to lack of oxygen, and they return to the diving bell as it ascends to the surface with the Falcon. Liao tries to escape with the Qianlao back to Xiamen but is killed by a missile.

== Characters ==
=== United States government ===
- Jack Ryan Sr.: President of the United States
- Mary Pat Foley: Director of national intelligence

=== American operators ===
- John Clark: Director of operations for The Campus (black side) and chief security officer for Hendley Associates, a private equity firm (white side)
- Domingo "Ding" Chavez: Former CIA officer; Campus operator
- Jack Ryan Jr.: Lead Campus operator; Hendley venture capitalist
- Kendrick Moore: Former SEAL, Campus operator
- Cary Marks: active-duty Green Beret, Campus operator
- Jad Mustafa: active-duty Green Beret, Campus operator

=== U.S. Navy dive team (MV Pacific Resolve) ===
- Dave Holloway: Pacific Resolve captain
- Doug Park: Retired master diver, dive supervisor
- Carla Bennett: Active-duty master diver, Experimental Diving Unit
- Danny Reyes: Active-duty SEAL, SDV Team One
- Chris Perry: Active-duty SEAL, SDV Team One

=== The Chinese (MV Qianlan) ===
- Sheng Liao: Ministry of State Security (MSS) paramilitary commander
- Lu Han: MSS paramilitary tactical officer
- Chen Wei: MSS signals analyst
- Zhang Mei: MSS electronic warfare specialist
- Zhao Wenqi: Former People’s Liberation Army Navy submariner, MSS minisubmarine pilot

== Reception ==
=== Commercial ===
The book debuted at number 13 at the Combined Print and E-Book Fiction category of the New York Times bestseller list for the week of September 20, 2026.

=== Critical ===
Red Carpet Crash praised the book, stating: “The action is incredible, especially the last third of the book.” Steve Thomas of Best Thriller Books noted the book’s underwater setting and praised Stewart: “He brings his own experience and voice to the story while retaining the military realism, technology, geopolitical stakes, and fast-paced action that I love about these books.”
