= Dead or Alive (novel) =

2010 thriller novel by Tom Clancy

- Author: Tom Clancy with Grant Blackwood
- Audio read by: Lou Diamond Phillips
- Language: English
- Series: The Campus; Jack Ryan
- Release number: 10
- Genre: Techno-thriller; Political thriller; Military fiction; Spy fiction
- Publisher: G.P. Putnam's Sons
- Publication date: December 7, 2010
- Publication place: United States
- Media type: Print (hard & paperback), audio
- Pages: 848
- ISBN: 978-0-399-15723-3
- Preceded by: The Teeth of the Tiger
- Followed by: Locked On

Dead or Alive is a techno-thriller novel, written by Tom Clancy and co-written with Grant Blackwood, and released on December 7, 2010. It is Clancy's first novel in seven years after The Teeth of the Tiger (2003), and follows the hunt by The Campus for "the Emir", a Middle Eastern terrorist based on Osama bin Laden. It unites several characters from the Ryanverse, including former president Jack Ryan, his son Jack Ryan Jr., his nephews Dominic and Brian Caruso, and Rainbow Six veterans John Clark and Domingo Chavez. The book debuted at number one on the New York Times bestseller list.

== Plot ==
Most wanted terrorist Saif Rahman Yasin, known as the Emir, secretly enters the United States by private plane. Having altered his physical appearance and living in the state of Nevada, he coordinates his massive operation as leader of terrorist organization Umayyad Revolutionary Council (URC), codenamed Lotus. It aims to weaken the current presidential administration with a series of seemingly isolated terrorist attacks and culminating in the destruction of the Yucca Mountain nuclear waste repository, using a nuclear device assembled from radioactive material stolen from an abandoned nuclear waste storage site in Russia, in order to poison the water table for the western United States.

After successfully foiling a hostage situation in the Swedish embassy in Tripoli, John Clark and Domingo Chavez are forcibly retired from their duties in the CIA and Rainbow. They are then recruited into The Campus, where they take part in the organization's hunt for the Emir, which spans through Sweden, Pakistan, Canada, and Libya. They suffer a tragedy, when operative Brian Caruso dies due to wounds sustained during a firefight with his brother Dominic, against URC terrorists in Tripoli. After further investigation and at one point cooperating with National Counterterrorism Center deputy head and Clark's longtime friend Mary Pat Foley, The Campus later deduce that the Emir is in the U.S.

Meanwhile, former president Jack Ryan is working on his memoirs and initially refusing to speak out against his successor, Ed Kealty. When he finds out that the Kealty administration are planning to prosecute U.S. Army Ranger Sam Driscoll for killing sleeping Middle Eastern terrorists in a cave during their fruitless search for the Emir, he decides to announce his candidacy for President of the United States in the next election. After the announcement, charges against Driscoll are dropped and he was given an honorable discharge. Clark later recruits him into The Campus. Additionally, Ryan finds out that his son Jack Ryan, Jr. is working for The Campus as an analyst, which he reluctantly accepts.

URC terrorists destroy a Petrobras oil refinery outside Paulínia, São Paulo, Brazil and trigger a series of attacks on small towns across the United States. Jack and Clark later thwart the destruction of a cargo ship carrying flammable material, killing the Indonesian perpetrators tasked by the URC. Chavez and Dominic are sent to Brazil in order to investigate the refinery incident and later capture a URC courier, who reveals that the Emir is in the U.S. and coordinating the attacks. Along with Clark and Jack, they proceed to Las Vegas to apprehend him, preventing him from blowing up the Yucca nuclear waste storage facility in the process. After returning to Virginia, they interrogate him by injecting him with succinylcholine and simulating a heart attack, allowing him to confess his crimes and reveal the plans behind Lotus, which involves the cooperation of Pakistani intelligence in conquering the country and securing their nuclear inventory. (Note: This plot point would be continued in Locked On) After a day of interrogations, the Emir was covertly given by The Campus to the FBI in order to be imprisoned and charged by due process of law.

== Development ==
After the lukewarm reception of his novel The Teeth of the Tiger (2002), Clancy took a break from writing fiction for seven years. Dead or Alive was announced by publisher Penguin Group in a press release on April 7, 2010. Penguin USA president David Shanks stated: "Tom's genius for telling a story with exceptional realism and cutting edge authenticity are his hallmarks as a writer. In his latest novel, he turns up the tension between U.S. forces and their most lethal rivals." Several characters from the Ryanverse such as Jack Ryan, John Clark, and The Campus were brought together in what was dubbed "the All-Star Team".

A book trailer was released on November 4, 2010. Clancy promoted the novel in a video discussion with retired U.S. Air Force general Chuck Horner, which was released on December 3, 2010. Dead or Alive was launched by the Yeomen Warders and the Red Devil paratroopers at the Tower of London on the eve of its eventual release.

The book was notable for its antagonist the Emir and his terrorist organization Umayyad Revolutionary Council, which were based on real-life terrorist Osama bin Laden and his group al Qaeda. It also inspired the idea that special forces units hunting for a terrorist like bin Laden are more likely to find him living in comfort, rather than in a cave in Pakistan or Afghanistan. This was proven true when bin Laden was killed by U.S. Navy SEALs in his compound in Abbottabad, Pakistan in May 2011, five months after the novel was published.

== Reception ==
=== Commercial ===
The book debuted at number one on the New York Times bestseller list. In addition, it debuted at number three on the USA Today's Best-selling Books list. A year later, the paperback trade edition of the book peaked at number eight on the New York Times bestseller list.

=== Critical ===
The book received average reviews. Publishers Weekly lauded it, saying that "Clancy is back at the top of his game." The Los Angeles Times was slightly less generous, calling it "sprawling but propulsive". Kirkus Reviews gave it a mixed review, stating: "If reality were a comic book or a Stallone script, this would be a useful road map. As it is, it'll be gobbled up like a Happy Meal, Ronald Reagan's 'perfect yarn' franchised into neatly packaged commodity."
