= Enemy Contact =

2019 novel by Mike Maden

- Author: Mike Maden
- Audio read by: Scott Brick
- Language: English
- Series: Jack Ryan Jr.
- Release number: 6
- Genre: Techno-thriller; Spy fiction; Realistic fiction
- Publisher: G.P. Putnam's Sons
- Publication date: June 11, 2019
- Publication place: United States
- Media type: Print (Hardcover, Paperback), Audio, eBook
- Pages: 468
- ISBN: 9780525541691
- Preceded by: Line of Sight
- Followed by: Firing Point

Enemy Contact (stylized as Tom Clancy Enemy Contact, Tom Clancy: Enemy Contact, or Tom Clancy's Enemy Contact in the United Kingdom) is a techno-thriller novel, written by Mike Maden and released on June 11, 2019. It is his third book in the Jack Ryan Jr. series, which is part of the Ryanverse featuring characters created by Tom Clancy.

The novel depicts a breach in the U.S. intelligence community that is connected to Ryan's mission in Poland. It debuted at number three on the New York Times bestseller list.

== Plot summary ==
A mysterious hacker known as CHIBI has been offering classified information to Iranian and Russian intelligence, which then cause a series of attacks on special operations units stationed in Argentina and Syria, respectively. Additionally, a German police officer working undercover in a drug case was killed in a mugging by Iron Syndicate operatives using information from the hacker. The demonstrated attacks then enable the three parties to participate in a secret silent auction to be held by CHIBI in London.

Meanwhile, Lawrence Fung is a hacker working for the red team of the recently built IC Cloud, a cloud database storing classified information gathered by the U.S. intelligence community. His job is to exploit any vulnerabilities in the database and patch them. However, he is revealed to be working with CHIBI for ideological reasons, and has been helping him with gathering actionable intelligence for the recent attacks.

U.S. senator Deborah Dixon withdraws her support for a foreign policy bill, which would have allowed the construction of a U.S. military base in Poland to counter Russian aggression. President Jack Ryan is convinced that the senator had changed her mind due to her connections with the Chinese, who stand to benefit due to the Belt and Road Initiative, an extensive trade route plan spanning Eurasia which has been bankrolling several interested Western businessmen including Dixon's husband, billionaire Aaron Gage. He discreetly orders an investigation into Dixon's finances.

Hendley Associates financial analyst Jack Ryan Jr. is tasked with the Dixon investigation. He finds out that Dixon's stepson, businessman Christopher Gage, does business with Chinese interests in Poland. He travels there, accompanied by Polish intelligence officer Liliana Pilecki, to look for illegal activities in Gage's businesses under the guise of researching for investment opportunities in the country. Initially finding nothing incriminating, they later investigate a Gage-owned warehouse in the Gdańsk shipyards. They are then abducted and tortured for information by Mathieu Cluzet, a French drug smuggler working for the Iron Syndicate. Afterwards, Cluzet throws Ryan and Pilecki out of his ship in the middle of the Baltic Sea. While Jack is later rescued, his partner drowns.

Meanwhile, in Angola, a local rebel force attacks an offshore oil rig under construction by the Chinese. Pressed by his superiors for retribution, Chinese intelligence officer Chen Xing turns to CHIBI for information about the rebel force's whereabouts. The hacker then orders Fung to pinpoint the location of the rebels. Using CHIBI's information, the PLA stages a surgical attack on the Angolan rebels, enabling Xing and Chinese intelligence to enter the auction.

The attack on the rebels attracts the attention of Director of National Intelligence Mary Pat Foley. She later finds out that the recent attacks in Argentina, Germany, Syria, and now Angola may have been the result of an intelligence breach within the IC Cloud. The cloud's head of security, Amanda Watson, imparts her suspicions about her colleague Fung, which leads Foley to track him down. However, CHIBI finds out about the manhunt and orders Fung's death, disguised as a suicide. Foley's investigation into the breach prematurely ends.

After recuperating in Virginia, Jack travels to Peru to honor his recently deceased friend Cory Chase's wishes. Still distraught over Liliana's death, he later discovers an illegal mining operation led by Cluzet's brother. Along with former U.S. Army Ranger Rick Sands, whom he had met in the area, Jack dispatches him and his men and then rescues the miners taken against their will.

Later reunited with his Campus colleagues, Jack tracks down the leader of the Iron Syndicate, known as the Czech, in the former Czech Republic. He instead reveals CHIBI's plot about the auction of an algorithmic key that would unlock the entire IC Cloud in a tech conference in London. The Campus, as well as Foley, scramble into London to track down CHIBI, who is revealed to be Watson. While the auction is still successful, Foley devises a plan to penetrate the Chinese, Iranian, and Russian intelligence agencies, while Watson is later sentenced to prison.

President Ryan informs Dixon about her stepson's association with the Chinese, which is by smuggling drugs around Europe and then laundering the dirty money produced into the senator's charities. After being informed of her brief investigation into Hendley Associates, he blackmails the senator into passing an anticorruption bill instead of being disgraced from politics. Meanwhile, Foley works on dismantling the Iron Syndicate, now deemed a national security threat. Gage is found dead in the Gdańsk shipyards, while the Czech is killed by a sniper working for Polish intelligence. Jack tracks down Cluzet in Libya and kills him in revenge for Liliana's death.

== Characters ==
=== The White House ===
- Jack Ryan: President of the United States
- Scott Adler: Secretary of state
- Mary Pat Foley: Director of national intelligence
- Robert Burgess: Secretary of defense
- Arnold van Damm: President Ryan's chief of staff

=== The Campus ===
- Gerry Hendley: Director of The Campus and Hendley Associates
- John Clark: Director of operations
- Domingo "Ding" Chavez: Senior operations officer
- Jack Ryan, Jr.: Operations officer and senior analyst for Hendley Associates
- Gavin Biery: Director of information technology
- Lisanne Robertson: Director of transportation

=== Cloudserve, Inc. ===
- Elias Dahm: CEO
- Amanda Watson: Senior design engineer and head of security for the Intelligence Community Cloud
- Lawrence Fung: Watson's number two and supervisor of the Red Team IC Cloud hacking group

=== Other characters ===
- Liliana Pilecki: Agent with Poland's Agencja Bezpieczeństwa Wewnętrznego (ABW)
- Senator Deborah Dixon (R): Chair, Senate Foreign Relations Committee
- Aaron Gage: Husband of Deborah Dixon and CEO and founder of Gage Capital Partners
- Christopher Gage: Stepson of Deborah Dixon and CEO of Gage Group International
- Rick Sands: Former member, 75th Ranger Regiment

== Development ==
Maden researched for the book by visiting Poland.

== Reception ==
=== Commercial ===
Enemy Contact debuted at number three at both the Combined Print and E-Book Fiction and Hardcover Fiction categories of the New York Times bestseller list for the week of June 29, 2019.

=== Critical ===
The book received positive reviews. Kirkus Reviews praised it as "another well-crafted and enjoyable escape from reality", saying that "Maden’s style meshes perfectly with the classic Clancy yarns, with global action, struggle, suffering, and formidable foes who get what they deserve." New York Journal of Books stated: "Maden has definitely made this character and his supporting cast his own in this excellent third trip through the Tom Clancy universe." On the other hand, Publishers Weekly gave the book a mixed review, stating that it is "competent but ponderous".
