= Jack Stewart (author) =

American novelist

- Occupation: Writer
- Writing career
- Genres: Thriller, military fiction
- Notable works: Unknown Rider; Silent Horizons; Tom Clancy: Pressure Depth
- Website: jackstewartbooks.com

Jack Stewart is an American novelist. He is known for the Battle Born series of thriller novels and the Silent Horizons series of military thrillers co-written with Chad Robichaux. Stewart is the current writer of the Jack Ryan Jr. series, which is part of the Ryanverse featuring characters created by Tom Clancy.

== Career ==
Stewart graduated from the U.S. Naval Academy and U.S. Navy Fighter Weapons School (TOPGUN) and holds a Master of Science in Global Leadership from the University of San Diego. He worked as a fighter pilot for twenty years. Stewart has credited the 1986 movie Top Gun for inspiring him to become a fighter pilot. After retiring from military service, he worked as an airline pilot.

Stewart published his debut novel, Unknown Rider, in 2023. Inspired by his experiences as a fighter pilot, the book was followed by three more sequels: Outlaw, Bogey Spades (both 2024), and Declared Hostile (2025).

In 2025, Stewart collaborated with Chad Robichaux on the novel Silent Horizons, followed by the sequel Riptide, to be released in 2026. He also published his entry in W.E.B. Griffin's Presidential Agent series, Direct Action, in December 2025.

Stewart took over the Jack Ryan Jr. series of novels, which is set in Tom Clancy's Ryanverse, from M. P. Woodward. His first book in the series, Tom Clancy: Pressure Depth, was released in 2026.

== Bibliography ==
=== Battle Born series ===
- Unknown Rider (2023)
- Outlaw (2024)
- Bogey Spades (2024)
- Declared Hostile (2025)

=== Silent Horizons series ===
Co-written with Chad Robichaux

- Silent Horizons (2025)
- Riptide (2026)

=== Presidential Agent series ===
Based on characters created by W.E.B. Griffin

- Direct Action (2025)

=== Jack Ryan Jr. series ===
Based on characters created by Tom Clancy

- Tom Clancy: Pressure Depth (2026)
- Tom Clancy: Zero Point (2027)
