= Command Authority =

2013 thriller novel by Tom Clancy

- Author: Tom Clancy with Mark Greaney
- Audio read by: Lou Diamond Phillips
- Language: English
- Series: Jack Ryan; The Campus
- Release number: 13
- Genre: Techno-thriller; Military fiction; Spy fiction; Realistic fiction
- Publisher: G.P. Putnam's Sons
- Publication date: December 3, 2013
- Publication place: United States
- Media type: Print (Hardcover, Paperback), Audio, eBook
- Pages: 736
- ISBN: 9780399160479
- Preceded by: Threat Vector
- Followed by: Full Force and Effect

Command Authority is a techno-thriller novel, written by Tom Clancy and co-written with Mark Greaney, and published on December 3, 2013. It is Clancy's last major work of fiction and was released two months after his death. Set during the Cold War and after the events of Threat Vector (2012), the novel features President Jack Ryan and The Campus as they must deal with Russian dictator Valeri Volodin, a character widely noted as similar to the real-life Russian president Vladimir Putin. The book debuted at number one on the New York Times bestseller list.

== Plot ==
Former KGB officer Valeri Volodin becomes president of Russia. Openly critical of the United States, he secretly tasks Russian domestic intelligence (FSB) with staging false flag attacks in an effort to justify an invasion of Ukraine. A bomb is detonated in a restaurant in Russia, killing Russian foreign intelligence (SVR) head Stanislav Biryukov; simultaneously, former SVR head Sergey Golovko falls ill to polonium poisoning while visiting his old friend, President Jack Ryan, in the White House. Volodin accuses the US government of orchestrating the recent incidents, and then announces the merger of the SVR and the FSB into one entity led by Roman Talanov, the mysterious head of FSB.

In Sevastopol, a CIA special mission compound comes under attack from pro-Russia protesters aided by FSB proxy agents. Campus operatives John Clark, Domingo "Ding" Chavez, and Dominic "Dom" Caruso, who are on the ground in Ukraine to gather intelligence on Russian criminal organization the Seven Strong Men and its head Gleb the Scar, take part in defending the compound in a tense battle between the protesters and Delta Force operators guarding the compound. Even though the compound's cover as a State Department facility is preserved, Volodin nevertheless decides to invade Ukraine, intent on pushing his troops all the way to the capital of Kyiv. President Ryan sends a few military troops to assist Ukrainian soldiers in the conflict with Russian forces as well as to prevent them from reaching Kyiv.

Meanwhile, Jack Ryan Jr. has been distancing himself from The Campus after its breach by the Chinese a year ago by working in a corporate analysis company based in London. While investigating a case involving a large theft of money by Russian state-owned companies from British businessman Malcolm Galbraith, he is tasked by his father with finding out information about the codename "Bedrock" and its connection to a mysterious KGB assassin codenamed Zenith during the Cold War, amidst rumors that Talanov is the assassin in question. Even amongst attacks from Seven Strong Men thugs, Jack finds out that Bedrock is former MI5 "illegal" Victor Oxley, who was tasked by British intelligence with tracking down and eliminating Zenith, who is indeed Talanov. Oxley had crossed paths with his father, then a CIA analyst investigating the murders on behalf of British foreign intelligence, in West Berlin just before he got caught by the East German Stasi; he was then shipped off to the KGB and imprisoned in a gulag for years.

When Jack finds out that the Zenith affair was connected to his case involving Galbraith, he (along with Oxley and fellow Campus operatives Chavez, Dom, and Sam Driscoll) confronts his boss Hugh Castor in his chalet outside Zurich, Switzerland. Castor is revealed to be Oxley's former handler in British intelligence who had been doing business with Talanov for years in exchange for Oxley going off the grid. He also reveals that Talanov is essentially the leader of the Seven Strong Men (making him expendable to the criminal organization since he was KGB), and that Dmitri Nesterov is Gleb the Scar, who is directly involved in Golovko's death. However, Spetsnaz forces sent by Talanov attack the chalet and kill Oxley and Castor. Ryan and his Campus operators manage to dispatch the attackers and flee the scene.

Back in Kyiv, Clark, Chavez, Dom, and Sam aid Delta Force operators in capturing Nesterov in the Seven Strong Men's heavily guarded base of operations. Having been fully informed by his son, President Ryan talks to Volodin, demanding the halt of the Russian army's advance into Kyiv in exchange for Volodin not being linked with the Seven Strong Men. Russia ceases operations in Ukraine and pulls back. Two days later, Talanov resigns his position and is subsequently murdered by one of his own guards.

== Release ==
Command Authority was released two months after Clancy's death from an undisclosed illness. In a statement, Putnam president Ivan Held said: "Tom Clancy left us an incredible group of characters and a truly phenomenal record of fictional plots that sometimes preceded world events. Command Authority shows his characters in just the kind of dire world situation that Tom's fans came to expect. And of course we hope Jack Ryan and The Campus team can live on." The Ryanverse was later continued with the release of Support and Defend by Greaney in July 2014.

== Reception ==
=== Commercial ===
The book debuted at number one on the Hardcover Fiction category of the New York Times bestseller list for the week of December 22, 2013; in addition, it charted at number two on the Combined Print and E-Book Fiction category of the same list.

=== Critical response ===
The book received mostly positive reviews. Publishers Weekly noted it as "a classic spy novel", concluding: "Fans of extended combat sequences should look elsewhere, as the focus is on high stakes espionage and assassinations carried out in rented rooms and dark alleys, not well-lit battlefields." Kirkus Reviews praised the "oddly timely" novel as "vintage Clancy" and "a pleasing fairytale for people who like things that blow up". In a mixed review, Chicago Tribune dismissed the novel, adding: "The result of this stubborn granularity makes for a sometimes sluggish pace over the course of such a doorstop of a book, an all but fatal flaw in a genre that makes its living off compelling the reader to keep the pages turning."
