= Line of Sight (novel) =

2018 novel by Mike Maden

- Author: Mike Maden
- Audio read by: Scott Brick
- Language: English
- Series: Jack Ryan Jr.
- Release number: 5
- Genre: Techno-thriller; Realistic fiction; Romantic thriller
- Publisher: G.P. Putnam's Sons
- Publication date: June 12, 2018
- Publication place: United States
- Media type: Print (Hardcover, Paperback), Audio, eBook
- Pages: 463
- ISBN: 9780735215924
- Preceded by: Point of Contact
- Followed by: Enemy Contact

Line of Sight (stylized as Tom Clancy Line of Sight, Tom Clancy: Line of Sight, or Tom Clancy’s Line of Sight in the United Kingdom) is a techno-thriller novel, written by Mike Maden and released on June 12, 2018. It is his second book in the Jack Ryan Jr. series, which is part of the Ryanverse featuring characters created by Tom Clancy.

In the novel, Ryan has to avert a sinister plot by Muslim extremists to provoke war between NATO and the Russians in the Balkans. It debuted at number three on the New York Times bestseller list.

== Plot summary ==
In Bosnia and Herzegovina, Al Qaeda in the Balkans leader Tarik Brkić, who is of Chechen descent, is tasked by his mysterious benefactor Red Wing to orchestrate false flag attacks on Croats, Bosniaks and Serbs in order to disrupt the Unity Referendum, an upcoming national gathering which aims to promote equality among the three rival ethnic groups. At the same time and without Red Wing's knowledge, Brkić also plans to provoke the Russians, who happen to be staging a military exercise nearby, into military action in the Balkans by arranging a terrorist attack, which would then incite the North Atlantic Treaty Organization (NATO) to intervene, resulting in a new world war. He obtains eighty thermobaric warheads as well as the accompanying missile guidance system, stolen from a Russian armory in Syria and smuggled into the country, for this purpose.

Meanwhile, Jack Ryan Jr. goes on an accounting job as a financial analyst for Hendley Associates in Ljubljana, Slovenia, on behalf of a Slovenian company which is looking to register to NASDAQ. Before the trip, he agrees to do a favor for his mother, Dr. Cathy Ryan, in which he will track down Aida Curić, her mother’s former patient, in the nearby city of Sarajevo in Bosnia. Aida, a Bosnian Muslim who escaped from her country during the Bosnian War, had her eyes cured by his mother twenty-five years ago.

After finishing his accounting job a week later, Jack explores the city, especially Triglav National Park, where he narrowly survives a murder attempt by a tourist known as Elena Iliescu. Unbeknownst to him, Iliescu is an assassin sent by a secret crime network called the Iron Syndicate, whose leader, Vladimir Vasilev, wanted Jack, as well as ex-senator Weston Rhodes, eliminated as revenge for the death of his colleague Tervel Zvezdev. (Note: As depicted in Point of Contact) Rhodes was later killed in his prison cell.

Jack informs his boss Gerry Hendley about the incident, who later learns about Iliescu’s connection to the Iron Syndicate from further investigation by Hendley Associates/The Campus head of IT Gavin Biery. He then sends The Campus to Europe in order to try to interrogate Iliescu; however, they find out that Elena was dead from a heart attack, silenced by the Iron Syndicate.

After being questioned by the Slovenian police about the incident, Jack proceeds to Sarajevo to track down Aida. Initially failing in his efforts, he prepares for his flight back to the U.S. when Aida herself shows up in his rented apartment. Instantly smitten by her beauty, Ryan postpones his flight for a few more days and spends time with her, exploring most of Bosnia through a popular tour service that she owns; he even volunteers in a refugee agency that she also holds. They get into a fling for a few days. On the last night of his stay in Bosnia, Jack and Aida encounter what Aida says are corrupt Serbian police officers (in fact they are Russian undercover agents searching for the stolen warheads). They manage to incapacitate them, which leads Jack to believe something is amiss.

The next day, Jack survives another murder attempt from an Iron Syndicate assassin in his rented apartment. He finally relents to Hendley’s persistent pleas and is about to fly home to the U.S. when he witnesses a plane being shot down by a surface-to-air missile, killing everyone aboard. Worried about Aida, he goes to her home, where he was abducted by the woman herself. Aida explains that she is part of her uncle Brkić's conspiracy plot and that she had ordered the attack on the civilian jet in order to kill Jack, who had become a loose end. She then reveals the impending missile strike, which is on a Serbian Orthodox Church event in Sarajevo's Olympic soccer stadium, as she leaves Ryan under her cousin, who is also involved in the scheme, to prepare for the attack. Eventually, Jack immobilizes him and escapes.

Jack tells his boss of the plot; his father, U.S. President Jack Ryan, his intelligence advisers, the military commanders based in Europe, and the Russian President are also informed. He tracks down Aida all the way to a dark tunnel, where he shoots her dead. He then proceeds to a nearby warehouse, where the forty thermobaric missiles are readied for launch. After informing Hendley of his location and engaging in a fistfight with Brkić's men, Jack narrowly escapes just before the building is destroyed by a Tomahawk missile ordered by his father. The rest of the rockets are then retrieved by Russian and Bosnian intelligence operatives inside the stadium.

It was revealed that Red Wing is the Turkish ambassador to Bosnia. Jack extracts a confession out of him, which was then uploaded to social media, humiliating him; he is later assassinated in an RPG attack. In the meantime, although Brkić escaped to Stockholm, Sweden, he was later killed in a mugging. Meanwhile, Vasilev was killed by The Campus in Paris, France, where he is recuperating from prostate cancer. Moreover, it was also revealed that the real Aida Curić was killed during the war in Bosnia after her eye surgery, and that the rest of her family was murdered by Bosnian mafia local head and Interpol fugitive Samir Kvržić, who wanted to change identities; the Aida that Jack knew was actually Sabina, his daughter. The Curić family's tour service was kept, but this time it was also used as a conduit to smuggle drugs, guns, and fugitives into the Balkans; when Samir died, his daughter took his place as the owner.

== Characters ==
=== United States government ===
- Jack Ryan: President of the United States
- Scott Adler: Secretary of State
- Mary Pat Foley: Director of National Intelligence
- Robert Burgess: Secretary of Defense
- Jay Canfield: Director of the Central Intelligence Agency
- Arnold van Damm: President Ryan's Chief of Staff

=== The Campus ===
- Gerry Hendley: Director of The Campus and Hendley Associates
- John Clark: Director of operations
- Dominic "Dom" Caruso: Operations officer
- Jack Ryan, Jr.: Operations officer / senior analyst
- Gavin Biery: Director of information technology
- Adara Sherman: Operations officer
- Bartosz "Midas" Jankowski: Operations officer
- Lisanne Robertson: Director of transportation

=== Other characters ===
- Dr. Cathy Ryan: First Lady of the United States
- Kemal Topal: Turkish ambassador to Bosnia and Herzegovina
- Tarik Brkić: Commander, Al-Qaeda in the Balkans
- Shafiq Walib: Captain, Syrian Arab Army
- Aslan Dzhabrailov: Lieutenant, Ground Forces of the Russian Federation
- Aida Curić: Owner, Happy Times! Balkan Tours
- Emir Jukić: Happy Times! chief operating officer and tour guide
- Dragan Kolak: Officer, Intelligence-Security Agency (OSA-OBA), Bosnia and Herzegovina

== Development ==
Maden researched for Line of Sight by visiting Bosnia and Herzegovina itself.

== Reception ==
=== Commercial ===
Line of Sight debuted at number three on the Combined Print and E-Book Fiction and Hardcover Fiction categories of the New York Times bestseller list for the week of July 1, 2018.

=== Critical ===
The book received positive reviews. Kirkus Reviews hailed it as "fast-moving and exciting" and adds that "this one reads like it came from Clancy himself". In a featured review, thriller novel reviewer The Real Book Spy praised it as "lightning-quick, filled with action, and heavy on surprises". However, Publishers Weekly gave the book a mixed review, stating that it "struggles to give a coherent picture of the politics of [Bosnia]", and that "Only a nostalgic love of these aging characters will induce readers to plow through the formulaic plot to the unsurprising ending."
