= Full Force and Effect =

2014 novel by Mark Greaney

- Author: Mark Greaney
- Audio read by: Scott Brick
- Language: English
- Series: Jack Ryan; The Campus
- Release number: 14
- Genre: Political thriller; Techno-thriller; Spy fiction; Realistic fiction
- Publisher: G.P. Putnam's Sons
- Publication date: December 2, 2014
- Publication place: United States
- Media type: Print (Hardcover, Paperback), Audio, eBook
- Pages: 688
- ISBN: 9780425279779
- Preceded by: Command Authority
- Followed by: Commander in Chief

Full Force and Effect (stylized as Tom Clancy Full Force and Effect, Tom Clancy: Full Force and Effect, or Tom Clancy's Full Force and Effect in the United Kingdom) is a political thriller, written by Mark Greaney and published on December 2, 2014. It is the fourteenth overall entry in the Jack Ryan series and Greaney's second solo entry in the Ryanverse, following three collaborations with original author Tom Clancy prior to Clancy's death in 2013.

In the novel, President Jack Ryan and The Campus must stop North Korean leader Choi Ji-hoon from developing his country's nuclear weapons program. It debuted at number three in the New York Times bestseller list.

== Plot ==
Supreme Leader of North Korea Choi Ji-hoon wants to develop his country's nuclear weapons program, but is being hindered by sanctions from the United States and its allies. He tasks his foreign intelligence chief, Ri Tae-jin, with fast-tracking the program in order for the country to be taken more seriously as a superpower. General Ri then arranges for mining to begin in the city of Chongju, where a large deposit of rare-earth minerals has been recently discovered; the profits produced would then be used to fund the nuclear weapons program. He acquires an investor, Mexican mining mogul Óscar Roblas de Mota, who in turn hires Duke Sharps, head of a U.S. corporate espionage and investigations firm, to oversee the mining operation.

Meanwhile, the U.S. government becomes concerned about North Korea's recent test firing of an intercontinental ballistic missile (ICBM), which had crashed into the Sea of Japan. They push for more sanctions in front of the United Nations. Recognizing the lack of intelligence assets in North Korea, Director of National Intelligence Mary Pat Foley tasks CIA non-official cover operative Adam Yao with infiltrating the Chongju mining operation under cover as a skilled worker. He eventually cultivates an asset in the form of his boss, Hwang Min-ho.

Later, a cargo ship bound for North Korea, which carried parts for the ICBM similar to the recently test fired one, was confiscated by the Navy SEALs. As a result, Choi and General Ri arrange for the assassination of U.S. President Jack Ryan, who has been an obstacle to their plan, to be done at his upcoming state visit in Mexico City; they later secure the services of an Iranian bombmaker named Adel Zarif and the Maldonado cartel.

Meanwhile, President Ryan arrives in Mexico City and is later injured in the assassination attempt on him; however, he survives. General Ri then sends a hit squad to kill Zarif in order to deny any connection to the North Koreans, but the bombmaker escapes. He then asks Roblas, who then tasks Edward Riley, one of Sharps's employees, to finish the job for him. This attracts the attention of The Campus, who have been investigating Sharps's connection to the North Koreans up to this point. They later rescue Zarif from Riley in a secluded villa owned by Roblas in Mexico, although Riley escapes and Campus operator Sam Driscoll dies.

Fearing for his life after failing to obtain the nuclear weapons and assassinate President Ryan, General Ri commits suicide, taking his family along with him. Meanwhile, Hwang reaches out to his contact in China, intending to defect. Yao is then tasked with spiriting him and his family out of North Korea via a drone with the ability to carry passengers. The drone does not fit Yao, so he has to escape on his own. He is later rescued by the Chinese, who were contacted by President Ryan.

Hwang later helps a coup backed by the Chinese in North Korea, deposing Choi from power. Meanwhile, The Campus tracks down Riley in Thailand and confront him. He tries to escape but falls to his death.

== Reception ==
=== Commercial ===
Full Force and Effect debuted at number three on the Combined Print & E-Book Fiction category of the New York Times bestseller list, as well as number five on the Hardcover Fiction category of the same list, for the week of December 21, 2014.

=== Critical ===
The book received generally positive reviews. Publishers Weekly praised the book as "meticulously researched and exciting" and added that "The sympathetic portrayal of many of the characters opposed to America adds depth." Kirkus Reviews praised Greaney, who "delivers a story reminiscent of the older Clancy novels by showing evidence of a deep understanding of spycraft, current events, and the natures of the people who work in the shadows, at the desk and on the front lines."
