= The Teeth of the Tiger =

2003 thriller novel by Tom Clancy

- Author: Tom Clancy
- Audio read by: Stephen Hoye
- Language: English
- Series: Jack Ryan Jr.; The Campus
- Release number: 1
- Genre: Thriller; Spy fiction
- Publisher: G.P. Putnam's Sons
- Publication date: August 11, 2003
- Publication place: United States
- Media type: Print (Hardcover, Paperback), Audio
- Pages: 480
- ISBN: 0-399-15079-X
- Preceded by: Red Rabbit
- Followed by: Dead or Alive

The Teeth of the Tiger is a thriller novel, written by Tom Clancy and released on August 11, 2003. Set in a post-9/11 world, it is the first book to feature The Campus, a covert intelligence agency created by President Jack Ryan before the end of his term as chief executive. While he does not appear in the book, his son Jack Ryan Jr., as well as his nephews Dominic and Brian Caruso, are featured as Campus operatives.

The book debuted at number one on the New York Times bestseller list, and would become Clancy's last solely written novel before a seven-year break from writing fiction.

== Plot ==
In Rome, a Mossad station chief is assassinated. The murder piques the interest of the Campus, an off-the-books intelligence agency created by former United States president Jack Ryan before the end of his presidential term. Situated in a high-rise office building that has direct line-of-sight between the main headquarters for the CIA and the NSA, the organization was created to "identify, locate, and deal with terrorist threats" in anticipation of the current administration's neglect of the CIA and the NSA. A private trading and arbitrage company, Hendley Associates, serves as a legitimate front for the Campus by funding its operations via stock market trades influenced by the captured intelligence data, thus removing federal oversight and allowing free rein in its operations.

Jack Ryan Jr., son of the former president, soon discovers the Campus' operations. Wanting to serve his country in the post-9/11 world, he is hired by the agency as an analyst. Elsewhere, his cousin Brian Caruso is a U.S. Marine returning from Afghanistan to be decorated for his achievements in battle. His twin brother Dominic is an FBI agent who, while investigating a kidnapping of a little girl, finds her raped and killed. Caruso kills the suspect ostensibly in self defense after purposely getting noticed, and the suspect reacts by grabbing a knife at gun-point (thereby providing a "threat").

The Caruso brothers are soon recruited into a Campus strike team, chosen for their ability to kill enemies in cold blood. However, Brian is unsure of the morality of carrying out preemptive assassinations, even against terrorists. This changes when cells of Islamic fundamentalists cross the U.S.-Mexico border and attack several suburban malls. Brian and Dominic happen to be at one of the malls when the attack occurs. Although they efficiently find and dispatch all four shooters, dozens of people are killed; similar massacres occur at most of the other targeted sites. When a child dies in his arms after the attack, Brian abandons his earlier moral qualms. The Campus decides the brothers are ready and implements a "reconnaissance by fire" strategy to flush out the terrorist leaders.

To carry out the assassinations, the brothers are issued a weapon utilizing succinylcholine, developed by a Columbia University professor whose brother died in the 9/11 attacks. The succinylcholine is delivered through a hypodermic needle disguised as a pen. Twisting the nib switches the tip from a normal tip to a sharp needle that delivers 7 milligrams of the substance. Only 5 milligrams are necessary for death. The substance causes complete paralysis at 30 to 50 seconds and death at 3 minutes, shutting down all the muscles within the victim (including the diaphragm), with the exception of the heart. However, it makes the murder look like a heart attack, thus raising no suspicion.

Disguised as tourists, the team travels across Europe, finding and murdering several major players in the terrorist organization. The first three murders go off fairly routinely, and for the third assassination, the brothers are joined by their cousin Jack. Although originally present as an observer, Jack is forced to kill the target himself when a random accident spills wine on the brothers' suits, spoiling their anonymous appearance. After murdering the terrorist (coincidentally in the same men's room where the terrorist had killed the Mossad station chief), Jack uses his hotel key to gain access to his computer and downloads the entire contents for later analysis.

== Controversy ==
The depiction of violence in a real setting elicited a minor controversy among Charlottesville and Albemarle County, Virginia residents at the time of its release, as reported by Charlottesville weekly newspaper The Hook. Charlottesville Fashion Square, a shopping mall in the Charlottesville area, serves as the setting of a massacre by a team of Islamic terrorists in the story. The scene includes accurate references to the mall's contemporary tenant stores, as well as to the University of Virginia.

A spokesperson for Charlottesville Fashion Square told The Hook that the mall's operators were not pleased with the mall's inclusion in the book. Albemarle County Police chief John Miller indicated that he did not consider the novel a threat to the town.

== Reception ==
=== Commercial ===
The book debuted at number one on the New York Times bestseller list. It also debuted at number one on the USA Today's Best-selling Books list for the week of August 21, 2003.

=== Critical ===
Like Red Rabbit, Clancy's The Teeth of the Tiger was poorly received by critics and reviews for The Teeth of the Tiger were "tepid at best." The Washington Post described it as a "bloated, boring, silly novel" with "inane dialogue, gossamer characterizations, endless repetition and bumper-sticker politics." The St. Louis Post-Dispatch panned it as well, saying that the most positive thing about the book was that it was "mercifully briefer than its chronological predecessor in the Jack Ryan series." The San Antonio Express-News described the novel as "an acceptable thriller" that is "an obvious attempt to reinvent the franchise [Clancy] has created."
