= Red Rabbit =

2002 thriller novel by Tom Clancy

- First edition
- Author: Tom Clancy
- Language: English
- Series: Jack Ryan
- Release number: 9
- Genre: Thriller; Spy fiction; Historical fiction
- Publisher: G.P. Putnam's Sons
- Publication date: August 5, 2002
- Publication place: United States
- Media type: Print (Hardcover, Paperback), Audio
- Pages: 640
- ISBN: 0399148701
- Preceded by: The Bear and the Dragon
- Followed by: The Teeth of the Tiger

Red Rabbit is a spy thriller novel, written by Tom Clancy and released on August 5, 2002. A prequel, it is set after the events of Patriot Games (1987) and incorporates the 1981 assassination attempt on Pope John Paul II. The title refers to a KGB communications officer who learns about chairman Yuri Andropov’s plot to kill the pontiff, and the book also features CIA analyst Jack Ryan as he takes part in the protagonist’s defection. The book debuted at number one on The New York Times Best Seller list.

== Plot ==
In 1982, Pope John Paul II privately issues a letter to the communist Polish government, stating that he will resign from the papacy and return to his hometown unless they cease their repression of counterrevolutionary movements in Poland, particularly the Solidarity trade union. Called the Warsaw Letter, it is later forwarded to Moscow, enraging Committee for State Security (KGB) chairman Yuri Andropov. He decides to plan the Pope's assassination, which he believes will reinvigorate communism in Eastern Europe, perceived by many to be in a state of decline. Known only by the number 15-8-82-666 for security reasons, the assassin is selected as a Turk Muslim (understood to be Mehmet Ali Ağca), who would then be eliminated by Bulgarian DS officer Boris Strokov afterwards for deniability. The operation is unanimously approved by the Politburo.

Oleg Zaitzev, a communications officer in the KGB tasked with sending and receiving encrypted communications, pieces together the plot to kill the Pope and becomes deeply troubled with the prospect of murdering an innocent person for political purposes. He decides to make contact with the CIA station chief Edward Foley, as well as his wife and agent Mary Pat, intending to defect and then be extracted out of the Soviet Union with his family, in exchange for providing information on the assassination plot as well as the names of KGB deep penetration agents in the American and British governments.

The Foleys instruct Zaitzev to bring his family to Budapest, Hungary, under the guise of taking a vacation. They are then to be assisted by British foreign intelligence (MI6) officers stationed in the city, since the CIA station there was recently shut down. As a result, Jack Ryan, CIA's liaison to MI6 in London, is sent there to represent the agency. One early morning, the Zaitzevs are spirited out of the hotel they were staying. Accompanied by Ryan, they are then smuggled to Yugoslavia, where they immediately fly to the UK. MI6 agents plant dead bodies that are physically identical to the family in their hotel room, which is then set on fire, thus deceiving the KGB.

After settling down in a safehouse outside Manchester, Zaitzev reveals what he knows about the assassination plot, which alarms the MI6 and the CIA. Ryan is later sent to St. Peter's Square in Vatican City to accompany the British SIS officers on the ground to ascertain how the attack on the Pope will play out, as well as to try capturing the shooter. At the Pope's weekly audience, Ryan manages to capture Strokov; however, the Pope is shot by the real shooter, Ağca. Nevertheless, the pontiff recovers from his wounds. It is then revealed that Strokov was executed by the British as retaliation for murdering Soviet defector Georgi Markov on British soil four years ago.

== Themes ==
Red Rabbit takes elements from Frederick Forsyth's thriller novel The Day of the Jackal (1973), although the assassin "is never so fully realized nor as sympathetic as the Jackal". Additionally in the novel, Clancy discusses the tradecraft of espionage, as well as life in Moscow before the fall of communism.

== Reception ==
=== Commercial ===
The book debuted at number one on the New York Times bestseller list. It also debuted at number one on the USA Today's Best-selling Books list for the week of August 16, 2002.

=== Critical ===
The novel received mixed reviews. As Marc Cerasini stated in his essay on the novel: "After the history-making events of September 11, 2001, a nostalgic trip back to the Cold War might not have been the novel Tom Clancy's fans were anticipating." In a mixed review, Publishers Weekly derided the lack of suspense, which is "a disappointment when other writers (Forsyth in Day of the Jackal, for one) have shown that there can be enough tension in a fated-to-fail assassination plot to give a stroke to a yoga master". CNN pointed out in a negative review that the book is a "bloated 618-page behemoth" full of historical inaccuracies.

Conversely, the book was praised for its "believable and encyclopedic" plot; Publishers Weekly remarked: "It's utterly fascinating to read Clancy's playing out of that likely scenario—is there a writer in the world who brings so much verisimilitude to scenes both high (Politburo meetings) and low (details of spy craft and everyday Soviet life)?" The Washington Post praised the book, stating: "Clancy moves skillfully among a large cast of characters in Washington, London and Moscow, and develops many of them effectively. [His] writing has improved since the clunky prose and robotic dialogue of his early novels."
