= Search and Destroy (novel) =

Spy novel by Tom Clancy

- First edition cover
- Author: Tom Clancy with Peter Telep
- Language: English
- Genre: Spy fiction; Techno-thriller; Military fiction
- Publisher: G.P. Putnam's Sons
- Publication date: July 5, 2012 (cancelled)
- Publication place: United States
- Media type: Print (Hardcover, Paperback), Audio, eBook
- Pages: 768
- ISBN: 978-0-399-16044-8
- Preceded by: Against All Enemies

Search and Destroy is a spy novel written by Tom Clancy and co-authored with Peter Telep. It was scheduled for release on July 5, 2012, but the release was cancelled. It is not to be confused with the 1980 nonfiction book Search and Destroy by Robin Moore.

== Plot ==
CIA Special Activities Division (SAD) officer and former Navy SEAL Max Moore has a dilemma: save the life of his wife or let her be killed for the lives of thousands of innocent people.
