= Grant Blackwood =

American writer

- Born: June 7, 1964 (age 62); Austin, Minnesota, U.S.
- Occupations: Novelist, ghostwriter
- Writing career
- Language: English
- Genre: Thriller
- Website: grantblackwood.com

Grant Blackwood (born June 7, 1964) is an American thriller writer and ghostwriter from Austin, Minnesota. He wrote the Briggs Tanner series. He co-authored with Clive Cussler Spartan Gold which reached number 10 on the New York Times Hardcover Fiction Best Sellers list. Blackwood spent three years as an Operations Specialist and pilot rescue swimmer aboard a guided missile frigate and is a veteran of the United States Navy.

== Novels ==
=== Briggs Tanner series ===
- The End of Enemies (2001)
- The Wall of Night (2002)
- An Echo of War (2003)

=== Fargo Adventures series (co-authored with Clive Cussler) ===
- Spartan Gold (2009)
- Lost Empire (2010)
- The Kingdom (2011)

=== Jack Ryan, Jr. Series ===
- Dead or Alive (2010) co-authored with Tom Clancy
- Tom Clancy: Under Fire (2015)
- Tom Clancy: Duty and Honor (2016)

=== Splinter Cell series (writing as "David Michaels") ===
- Tom Clancy's Splinter Cell: Checkmate (2006)
- Tom Clancy's Splinter Cell: Fallout (2007)

=== EndWar series (writing as "David Michaels") ===
- Tom Clancy's EndWar (2008)
- Tom Clancy's EndWar: The Hunted (2011)

=== Tucker Wayne series (with James Rollins) ===
- The Kill Switch (Tucker Wayne #1) (2014)
- War Hawk (Tucker Wayne #2) (January 1, 2016)

=== The Luke Daniels Series (with Steve Berry) ===
- The 9th Man (2023)
- Red Star Falling (2024)

== Short story ==
- "Sacrificial Lion" (2006) in the anthology Thriller, edited by James Patterson

== Awards ==
- Finalist for the 2002 Minnesota Book Award in Popular Fiction for End of Enemies.
