= Peter Telep =

American writer

- Born: April 8, 1965 (age 61); Yonkers, New York, U.S.
- Occupations: Novelist; educator; screenwriter
- Writing career
- Pen name: Ben Weaver, P.W. Storm, Pete Callahan
- Genre: Science fiction
- Website: www.amazon.com/Peter-Telep/e/B001HODW5I

Peter Telep (born April 8, 1965) is an American author, screenwriter, and educator who has collaborated with the late Tom Clancy. He has written over 50 books, and has written scripts for multiple television shows. He is currently a teacher at The University of Central Florida.

== Biography ==
Telep was born in Yonkers, New York, but moved to Long Island at a young age, where he lived an "average childhood". He attended Southampton College, where he did most of his undergraduate work, but dropped out during his senior year. After spending a few years in Los Angeles, working on television shows, he returned to school at The University of Central Florida where he earned his undergraduate and graduate degrees. He currently resides in Orlando, Florida and teaches composition, scriptwriting, and creative writing courses at The University of Central Florida. Telep enjoys fishing and is a certified cycling instructor.

== Written works ==
The following was taken from Telep's official website:

=== Books ===
The Squire series

- Squire (1995)
- Squire's Blood (1995)
- Squire's Honor (1996)

Space: Above and Beyond

- Space: Above and Beyond (1995)
- Demolition Winter (1997)

The Descent series

- Descent (1999)
- Stealing Thunder (1999)
- Equinox (1999)

Wing Commander

- Wing Commander (1999)
- Wing Commander - Junior Novelization (1999)
- Pilgrim Stars (1999)

Red Planet

- Red Planet (2001)

Brothers in Arms series (as Ben Weaver)

- Brothers in Arms (2001)
- Rebels in Arms (2002)
- Patriots in Arms (2003)

Night Angel 9 series

- Night Angel 9 (2001)
- Playing With Fire (2001)
- Life Flight (2001)

Force 5 Recon series (as P.W. Storm)

- Deployment: Pakistan (2003)
- Deployment: North Korea (2004)
- Deployment: Philippines (2004)

Armored Corps series (as Pete Callahan)

- Armored Corps (2005)
- Engage and Destroy (2005)
- Attack by Fire (2006)

The Mercenaries series (as P.W. Storm)

- Blood Diamonds (2006)
- Thunderkill (2007)
- Mad Dogs and Englishmen (2008)

Special Forces Afghanistan

- Direct Action (2008)
- Critical Action (2009)

Ghost Recon series

- Tom Clancy's Ghost Recon: Choke Point (2012)

EndWar series

- Tom Clancy's EndWar: The Missing (2013)

Co-written with Tom Clancy

- Against All Enemies (2011)
- Search and Destroy (written 2012 but never published)

=== Screenplays ===
In the Heat of the Night

- A Final Arrangement (Season 4, Episode 10)

The Legend of Prince Valiant

- The Crossbow (Season 2, Episode 38)
