= Tom Clancy bibliography =

The following is a complete list of books published by Tom Clancy, an American author of contemporary spy fiction and military fiction.

== Works by publication year ==
1. The Hunt for Red October (1984)
Clancy's first published novel. When Marko Ramius, captain of Soviet Navy's most advanced ballistic missile submarine Red October, goes rogue, CIA analyst Jack Ryan must prove his theory that Ramius intends to defect to the United States. The 1990 movie stars Alec Baldwin as Ryan and Sean Connery as Ramius.
2. Red Storm Rising (1986, with Larry Bond)
War between NATO and USSR. This book is not a member of the Ryanverse, although the character Robert Toland shares many similarities with Ryan.
3. Patriot Games (1987)
Prequel to The Hunt for Red October. Ryan and his family become targets of the an Irish terrorist group after he foils their kidnapping attempt on the Prince and Princess of Wales in London. The 1992 movie stars Harrison Ford as Ryan and Sean Bean as his antagonist Sean Miller.
4. The Cardinal of the Kremlin (1988)
The sequel to The Hunt for Red October. First appearance of John Clark and Sergey Golovko. Ryan extracts CARDINAL, CIA's highest agent in place in the Soviet military.
5. Clear and Present Danger (1989)
Ryan becomes acting Deputy Director of Intelligence at the CIA and learns that he is being kept in the dark by his colleagues who are conducting a covert war against a drug cartel based in Colombia. The 1994 film stars Harrison Ford as Ryan, Willem Dafoe as Clark, and Raymond Cruz as Domingo "Ding" Chavez.
6. The Sum of All Fears (1991)
Palestinian and former East German terrorists conspire to bring the United States and Soviet Union into war by detonating a nuclear weapon lost by Israel. Ryan, now Deputy Director of Intelligence but ostracized by the U.S. president and his mistress, tries to avert the crisis. The 2002 film stars Ben Affleck as Ryan and Liev Schreiber as Clark, and changes the identity and motivation of the terrorists to neo-Nazis.
7. Without Remorse (1993)
Without Remorse takes place during the Vietnam War, when Ryan was a teenager. Ex-SEAL John Kelly fights a one man war against drug dealers in Baltimore, attracting the attention of Ryan’s father Emmet, a Baltimore police detective. He also helps plan and execute a raid on a prisoner-of-war camp in North Vietnam, and later joins the CIA as John Clark. The 2021 film stars Michael B. Jordan as Clark and Jamie Bell as Robert Ritter.
8. Debt of Honor (1994)
A secret cabal of extreme nationalists gains control of Japan and start a war with the U.S. Ryan, now National Security Advisor, as well as Clark and Chavez, agents in Japan, help win the war. The Vice President resigns in a scandal, and the President appoints Ryan to replace him. A vengeful Japanese airline pilot then crashes a jetliner into the U.S. Capitol during a joint session of Congress attended by most senior U.S. government officials, including the President. Ryan thus becomes the new President through succession.
9. Executive Orders (1996)
Now-President Ryan survives press hazing, an assassination attempt, and a biological warfare attack on the United States. Clark and Chavez trace the virus to a Middle Eastern madman, and the U.S. military goes to work.
10. SSN: Strategies for Submarine Warfare (1996, with Martin Greenberg)
Follows the missions of USS Cheyenne in a future war with China precipitated by China's invasion of the disputed Spratly Islands. Also not part of the Ryanverse, SSN is actually a loosely connected collection of "scenario" chapters in support of the eponymous video game.
11. Rainbow Six (1998)
Released to coincide with the video game of the same name. Clark and Chavez, who is now Clark's son-in-law, lead an elite multinational anti-terrorist unit as they unravel a worldwide genocide attempt by eco-terrorists.
12. The Bear and the Dragon (2000)
War between Russia and China. Ryan recognizes the independence of Taiwan, Chinese police officers kill a Roman Catholic Cardinal, and American armed forces help Russia defeat a Chinese invasion of Siberia.
13. Red Rabbit (2002)
In the early 1980s, CIA analyst Ryan aids in the defection of a Soviet officer who knows of a plan to assassinate Pope John Paul II.
14. The Teeth of the Tiger (2003)
Ryan's son Jack Ryan Jr. becomes an analyst for The Campus, an off-the-books intelligence agency with the freedom to discreetly assassinate individuals "who threaten national security", following the end of the Ryan administration. Also features his two cousins Dominic and Brian Caruso.
15. Dead or Alive (2010, with Grant Blackwood)
The story picks up where The Teeth of the Tiger left off with Jack Jr. and The Campus trying to catch a terrorist known as the Emir.
16. Against All Enemies (2011, with Peter Telep)
After surviving a Taliban bombing attack in Pakistan that claims the lives of his colleagues and his asset, CIA paramilitary officer and former Navy SEAL Max Moore is assigned by a government joint task force to take down a Mexican drug cartel. Along the way, he must deal with Taliban terrorists trying to enter the United States through the Mexico–United States border.
17. Locked On (2011, with Mark Greaney)
While Jack Jr. trains to become a field operative within The Campus, his father campaigns for re-election as President of the United States. A devout enemy of Jack Sr. launches a privately funded vendetta to discredit him, while a corrupt Pakistani general has entered into a deadly pact with Dagestani terrorists to procure nuclear warheads.
18. Threat Vector (2012, with Mark Greaney)
President Ryan and The Campus must deal with a Chinese expansionist government intent on annexing territories in the South China Sea by military force as well as Hong Kong, Macau, and Taiwan. They must also deal with a Chinese version of The Campus, which are instrumental for a series of devastating cyber attacks on American infrastructure.
19. Command Authority (2013, with Mark Greaney)
President Ryan, with help from The Campus, deals with new Russian strongman Valeri Volodin, who is intent on annexing Ukraine. Along the way, he must also contend with his rise to power, which is anchored on a dark secret that Ryan himself had encountered back when he was a CIA analyst.

=== Post-Clancy novels ===
The following titles were not written by Clancy. They continue to develop the storylines of Clancy's novels but were written after his death.

1. Support and Defend (2014, by Mark Greaney)
FBI agent and The Campus operative Dominic Caruso must stop a seemingly rogue National Security Council (NSC) staffer who had run off with top secret documents and is being pursued by Iranians and the Russians.
2. Full Force and Effect (2014, by Mark Greaney)
President Ryan and The Campus must stop North Korean leader Choi Ji-hoon from developing his country's nuclear weapons program.
3. Under Fire (2015, by Grant Blackwood)
Jack Jr. helps his mysterious friend Seth Gregory, who is involved in Dagestan's struggle for independence from Russia.
4. Commander in Chief (2015, by Mark Greaney)
President Ryan and The Campus must stop Russian president Volodin from launching a covert violent offensive in an effort to bring back Russia as a superpower.
5. Duty and Honor (2016, by Grant Blackwood)
Jack Jr. must stop a German private contractor from unleashing false flag attacks to profit from the war on terror.
6. True Faith and Allegiance (2016, by Mark Greaney)
President Ryan and The Campus must contain a massive intelligence breach that has been responsible for a series of terrorist attacks on American military and intelligence personnel.
7. Point of Contact (2017, by Mike Maden)
While in Singapore, Jack Jr. must help his mysterious colleague in Hendley Associates Paul Brown avert a North Korean plot to crash the Asian stock market.
8. Power and Empire (2017, by Marc Cameron)
President Ryan and The Campus must prevent a secret cabal heightening the tensions between the United States and China from causing a violent coup in the Chinese government.
9. Line of Sight (2018, by Mike Maden)
Jack Jr. is in Bosnia and Herzegovina partly on his mother’s errand to track down her former patient. While evading a Bulgarian crime boss who has a vendetta against him, he has to avert a sinister plot by Turkey to provoke war between NATO and the Russians in the Balkans.
10. Oath of Office (2018, by Marc Cameron)
President Ryan deals with a domestic flu outbreak, a political rival with an anti-Ryan agenda, and a hostage situation in the United States embassy in Cameroon. The Campus uncovers a sinister plot behind a series of protests in Iran, favorably dubbed as the Persian Spring.
11. Enemy Contact (2019, by Mike Maden)
While investigating on a seemingly unrelated matter in Poland, Jack Jr. finds out about a breach in the U.S. intelligence community.
12. Code of Honor (2019, by Marc Cameron)
President Ryan deals with the imprisonment of his friend and former CIA colleague Father Pat West in Indonesia. The Campus race against time to retrieve next-generation AI software before the Chinese military use it for sinister purposes.
13. Firing Point (2020, by Mike Maden)
Jack Jr. investigates the death of his former classmate in a bombing in Barcelona, Spain, while President Ryan scrambles to track down those responsible for the disappearances of container ships across the oceans.
14. Shadow of the Dragon (2020, by Marc Cameron)
President Ryan deals with a mole in the CIA as The Campus tracks down a missing Chinese scientist and his Uyghur assistant.
15. Target Acquired (2021, by Don Bentley)
Jack Jr. stumbles into an Iranian plot to destroy Israel after saving a woman and her child from an attempted murder.
16. Chain of Command (2021, by Marc Cameron)
President Ryan deals with an Indian billionaire who plots to intimidate him into repealing a pharmaceutical bill through kidnapping the First Lady, among others.
17. Zero Hour (2022, by Don Bentley)
Jack Jr. races against time to stop a second Korean War after the Supreme Leader of North Korea is incapacitated.
18. Red Winter (2022, by Marc Cameron)
Set in 1985, CIA analyst Ryan works with Mary Pat Foley to investigate a possible East German defector, as a Stasi agent steals a piece of top-secret technology from an F-117 Nighthawk stealth plane that crashed in the Nevada desert.
19. Flash Point (2023, by Don Bentley)
Jack Jr. deals with an attack on The Campus from Chinese mercenaries.
20. Weapons Grade (2023, by Don Bentley)
Jack Jr. investigates a cold case after witnessing a car accident turned professional hit in Texas, as his father tries to prevent Iran from developing its nuclear weapons program.
21. Command and Control (2023, by Marc Cameron)
President Ryan finds himself in the middle of a coup in Panama, while The Campus track down the shadow group Camarilla.
22. Act of Defiance (2024, by Brian Andrews & Jeffrey Wilson)
Forty years after dealing with the Red October, President Ryan takes on another Russian nuclear submarine headed for the United States. Introduces Ryan's youngest daughter Katie Ryan, an Office of Naval Intelligence analyst.
23. Shadow State (2024, by M. P. Woodward)
Jack Jr. uncovers a conspiracy while working for Hendley Associates in Vietnam.
24. Defense Protocol (2024, by Brian Andrews & Jeffrey Wilson)
President Ryan must prevent the Chinese president from invading Taiwan.
25. Line of Demarcation (2025, by M. P. Woodward)
Jack Jr. and the Campus must stop a conspiracy between Venezuelan narcoterrorists and Russian mercenaries to seize Guyana's newly discovered oil fields.
26. Terminal Velocity (2025, by M. P. Woodward)
Jack Jr. and the Campus must stop the Emir's son Rafa from carrying out terror attacks in Pakistan and the United States.
27. Executive Power (2025, by Brian Andrews & Jeffrey Wilson)
President Ryan must deal with the disappearance of his son Kyle during a coup in Angola.
28. Rules of Engagement (2026, by Ward Larsen)
President Ryan uncovers a Russian conspiracy to disrupt the global oil trade after ordering the investigation of a plane crash in Turkey that killed a Cabinet member.
29. Pressure Depth (2026, by Jack Stewart)
Jack Jr. and the Campus must recover Cold War-era submersible technology near the Mariana Trench before Chinese agents acquire it.
30. The Coldest War (forthcoming November 2026, by M. P. Woodward)
31. Zero Point (forthcoming May 2027, by Jack Stewart)

Cancelled:

- Search and Destroy (unpublished, with Peter Telep)

== Works by series ==
=== Jack Ryan series ===
- The Hunt for Red October (1984)
- Patriot Games (1987)
- The Cardinal of the Kremlin (1988)
- Clear and Present Danger (1989)
- The Sum of All Fears (1991)
- Debt of Honor (1994)
- Executive Orders (1996)
- The Bear and the Dragon (2000)
- Red Rabbit (2002)

==== The Campus series ====
- The Teeth of the Tiger (2003)
- Dead or Alive (2010, with Grant Blackwood)
- Locked On (2011, with Mark Greaney)
- Threat Vector (2012, with Mark Greaney)
- Command Authority (2013, with Mark Greaney)

=== John Clark series ===
- Without Remorse (1993)
- Rainbow Six (1998)

=== Standalone ===
- Red Storm Rising (1986, with Larry Bond)
- SSN (1996, with Martin Greenberg)
- Against All Enemies (2011, with Peter Telep)

=== Post-Clancy novels ===
==== With Jack Ryan and The Campus ====
- Support and Defend (2014, by Mark Greaney)
- Full Force and Effect (2014, by Mark Greaney)
- Commander in Chief (2015, by Mark Greaney)
- True Faith and Allegiance (2016, by Mark Greaney)
- Power and Empire (2017, by Marc Cameron)
- Oath of Office (2018, by Marc Cameron)
- Code of Honor (2019, by Marc Cameron)
- Shadow of the Dragon (2020, by Marc Cameron)
- Chain of Command (2021, by Marc Cameron)
- Red Winter (2022, by Marc Cameron)
- Command and Control (2023, by Marc Cameron)
- Act of Defiance (2024, by Brian Andrews and Jeffrey Wilson)
- Defense Protocol (2024, by Brian Andrews and Jeffrey Wilson)
- Executive Power (2025, by Brian Andrews and Jeffrey Wilson)
- Rules of Engagement (2026, by Ward Larsen)
- The Coldest War (forthcoming 2026, by M. P. Woodward)

==== With Jack Ryan, Jr. ====
- Under Fire (2015, by Grant Blackwood)
- Duty and Honor (2016, by Grant Blackwood)
- Point of Contact (2017, by Mike Maden)
- Line of Sight (2018, by Mike Maden)
- Enemy Contact (2019, by Mike Maden)
- Firing Point (2020, by Mike Maden)
- Target Acquired (2021, by Don Bentley)
- Zero Hour (2022, by Don Bentley)
- Flash Point (2023, by Don Bentley)
- Weapons Grade (2023, by Don Bentley)
- Shadow State (2024, by M. P. Woodward)
- Line of Demarcation (2025, by M. P. Woodward)
- Terminal Velocity (2025, by M. P. Woodward)
- Pressure Depth (2026, by Jack Stewart)
- Zero Point (forthcoming May 2027, by Jack Stewart)

== Non-fiction ==
=== Guided Tour ===
- Submarine: A Guided Tour Inside a Nuclear Warship (1993)
- Armored Cav: A Guided Tour of an Armored Cavalry Regiment (1994)
- Fighter Wing: A Guided Tour of an Air Force Combat Wing (1995)
- Marine: A Guided Tour of a Marine Expeditionary Unit (1996)
- Airborne: A Guided Tour of an Airborne Task Force (1997)
- Carrier: A Guided Tour of an Aircraft Carrier (1999)
- Special Forces: A Guided Tour of U.S. Army Special Forces (2001)

=== Study in Command ===
External videos
- Booknotes interview with Clancy and Franks on Into the Storm, July 13, 1997, C-SPAN
- Presentation by Clancy and Horner to the National Press Club on Every Man a Tiger, May 18, 1999, C-SPAN
- Interview with Clancy and Zinni on Battle Ready, June 3, 2004, C-SPAN

- Into the Storm – On the Ground in Iraq (with Fred Franks) (1997)
- Every Man a Tiger — the Gulf War Air Campaign (with Chuck Horner) (1999)
- Shadow Warriors — Inside the Special Forces (with Carl Stiner) (2002)
- Battle Ready (with Anthony Zinni) (2004)

=== Other ===
- The Tom Clancy Companion (1992, edited by Martin H. Greenberg) — Writings by Clancy along with a concordance of all his fiction novels, detailing characters and military units or equipment.

== Created by Tom Clancy ==
Note: the following novels were created by Clancy; they were not necessarily written by him.

=== Op-Center universe ===
Created by Tom Clancy and Steve Pieczenik, written by Jeff Rovin unless otherwise indicated

1. Op-Center (1995)
2. Mirror Image (1995)
3. Games of State (1996)
4. Acts of War (1997)
5. Balance of Power (1998)
6. State of Siege (1999)
7. Divide and Conquer (2000)
8. Line of Control (2001)
9. Mission of Honor (2002)
10. Sea of Fire (2003)
11. Call to Treason (2004)
12. War of Eagles (2005)
13. Out of the Ashes (2014, by Dick Couch and George Galdorisi)
14. Into the Fire (2015, by Dick Couch and George Galdorisi)
15. Scorched Earth (2016, by George Galdorisi)
16. Dark Zone (2017, by Jeff Rovin and George Galdorisi)
17. For Honor (2018)
18. Sting of the Wasp (2019)
19. God of War (2020)
20. The Black Order (2021)
21. Call of Duty (2022)
22. Fallout (2023)

=== Net Force universe ===
==== Original Net Force universe ====
Created by Tom Clancy and Steve Pieczenik, written by Steve Perry unless otherwise indicated

1. Net Force (1998)
2. Hidden Agendas (1999)
3. Night Moves (1999)
4. Breaking Point (2000)
5. Point of Impact (2001)
6. CyberNation (2001)
7. State of War (2003, by Steve Perry and Larry Segriff)
8. Changing of the Guard (2003, by Steve Perry and Larry Segriff)
9. Springboard (2005, by Steve Perry and Larry Segriff)
10. The Archimedes Effect (2006, by Steve Perry and Larry Segriff)

==== Net Force 2018 universe ====
Created by Tom Clancy and Steve Pieczenik, written by Jerome Preisler unless otherwise indicated

- Code War (2013, novella)

==== Net Force Relaunch universe ====
Created by Tom Clancy and Steve Pieczenik, written by Jerome Preisler unless otherwise indicated

- 0,5. Eye of the Drone (2020, novella set before events of Dark Web)
- 1. Dark Web (2019)
- 2. Attack Protocol (2020)
- 2,5. Kill Chain (2021, novella set between events of Attack Protocol and Threat Point)
- 3. Threat Point (2021)
- 4. Moving Target (2023)

=== Net Force Explorers universe ===
Created by Tom Clancy and Steve Pieczenik, written by Diane Duane unless otherwise indicated

1. Virtual Vandals (1998)
2. The Deadliest Game (1998)
3. One is the Loneliest Number (1999)
4. The Ultimate Escape (1999, by Marc Cerasini)
5. The Great Race (1999, by Bill McCay)
6. End Game (1999)
7. Cyberspy (1999, by Bill McCay)
8. Shadow of Honor (2000, by Mel Odom)
9. Private Lives (2000, by Bill McCay)
10. Safe House (2000)
11. GamePrey (2000, by Mel Odom)
12. Duel Identity (2000, by Bill McCay)
13. Deathworld (2000)
14. High Wire (2001, by John Helfers and Russell Davis)
15. Cold Case (2001, by Bill McCay)
16. Runaways (2001)
17. Cloak and Dagger (2002)
18. Death Match (2002)

=== Power Plays series ===
Created by Tom Clancy and Martin Greenberg and written by Jerome Preisler

1. Politika (1997)
2. ruthless.com (1998)
3. Shadow Watch (1999)
4. Bio-Strike (2000)
5. Cold War (2001)
6. Cutting Edge (2002)
7. Zero Hour (2003)
8. Wild Card (2004)

== Video game, novelizations and tie-ins ==
Note: Splinter Cell, EndWar, H.A.W.X, and Ghost Recon novelizations were mostly written by David Michaels, a pseudonym used by several authors, except where indicated.

=== Splinter Cell universe ===
- Tom Clancy's Splinter Cell (2004)
- Tom Clancy's Splinter Cell: Operation Barracuda (2005)
- Tom Clancy's Splinter Cell: Checkmate (2006)
- Tom Clancy's Splinter Cell: Fallout (2007)
- Tom Clancy's Splinter Cell: Conviction (2009)
- Tom Clancy's Splinter Cell: Endgame (2009)
- Tom Clancy's Splinter Cell: Blacklist Aftermath (2013, by Peter Telep)
- Tom Clancy's Splinter Cell: Firewall (2022, by James Swallow)
- Tom Clancy's Splinter Cell: Dragonfire (2023, by James Swallow)

==== Comic books ====
- Tom Clancy's Splinter Cell: Pandora Tomorrow (2006, written by Jerry Holkins and illustrated by Mike Krahulik)
- Tom Clancy's Splinter Cell: Digging in the Ashes (2010, written by Eddie Deighton & Jon Sloan and illustrated by Mike Dowling)
- Tom Clancy's Splinter Cell: Echoes (2014, written by Nathan Edmondson and illustrated by Marc Laming)

=== Ghost Recon universe ===
- Tom Clancy's Ghost Recon (2008)
- Tom Clancy's Ghost Recon: Combat Ops (2011)
- Tom Clancy's Ghost Recon: Choke Point (2012, by Peter Telep)
- Tom Clancy's Ghost Recon Wildlands: Dark Waters (2017, by Richard Dansky)

=== EndWar universe ===
- Tom Clancy's EndWar (2008)
- Tom Clancy's EndWar: The Hunted (2011)
- Tom Clancy's EndWar: The Missing (2013, by Peter Telep)

=== H.A.W.X universe ===
- Tom Clancy's H.A.W.X (2009)

=== The Division universe ===
- Tom Clancy's The Division: New York Collapse (2016, by Alex Irvine)
- Tom Clancy's The Division: Broken Dawn (2019, by Alex Irvine)
- Tom Clancy's The Division: Recruited (2022, by Thomas Parrott)
- Tom Clancy's The Division: Compromised (2022, by Thomas Parrott)
- Tom Clancy's The Division: Hunted (2024, by Thomas Parrott)

==== Audiobooks ====
- Tom Clancy's The Division: Hearts on Fire (2021, by KC Wayland)

==== Comic books ====
- Tom Clancy's The Division: Extremis Malis (2019, by Christofer Emgard)
- Tom Clancy's The Division: Remission (2021, by Jean-David Morvan)

== External ==
- In Depth interview with Clancy, February 3, 2002, C-SPAN
