= Command and Control (novel) =

2023 novel by Marc Cameron

- Author: Marc Cameron
- Audio read by: Scott Brick
- Language: English
- Series: Jack Ryan; The Campus
- Release number: 23
- Genre: Techno-thriller; Military fiction; Realistic fiction
- Publisher: G.P. Putnam's Sons
- Publication date: November 21, 2023
- Publication place: United States
- Media type: Print (Hardcover), Audio, eBook
- Pages: 464
- ISBN: 9780593422847
- Preceded by: Red Winter
- Followed by: Act of Defiance

Command and Control (stylized as Tom Clancy Command and Control or Tom Clancy: Command and Control) is a techno-thriller novel, written by Marc Cameron and published on November 21, 2023. It is his seventh and final book in the Jack Ryan series, which is part of the Ryanverse featuring characters created by Tom Clancy.

In the novel, President Ryan finds himself in the middle of a coup in Panama as The Campus track down the shadow group Camarilla.

== Plot summary ==
In Venezuela, a CIA Ground Branch team led by non-official cover officer Adam Yao tracks down Venezuelan-Russian assassin Joaquín Fernando Gorshkov. They assassinate him with a killer drone that also eliminates his Chilean bodyguard Manuel Ramirez, a known operative of the shadow group Camarilla, which had previously kidnapped First Lady Cathy Ryan. Gorshkov's sister Sabine witnesses her brother's murder and vows revenge on director of national intelligence Mary Pat Foley, who had ordered the hit.

U.S. President Jack Ryan accepts Panamanian president Rafael Botero's invitation to a last-minute visit to his country, which is in the middle of a workers' strike. Unbeknownst to them, Botero's economic adviser Felix Moncada plots a coup with the help of Sabine and Camarilla operative Ian Doyle, as the Russian destroyer Admiral Chabanenko and landing vessel Ivan Gren are about to pass westward through the Panama Canal from recent joint maneuvers in Cuba and Venezuela. At the same time, police officer Gabriella Canto raids a weapons shipment and discovers plans for the coup. She informs police commissioner Javier Guerra, who silences one of the suspects before he could identify him as being part of the coup.

Meanwhile, Campus director of operations John Clark and his assistant Domingo "Ding" Chavez recruit two new members: Texan police officer Steven "Chilly" Edwards (who had rescued the First Lady from her kidnappers) and Amanda "Mandy" Cobb, a recent FBI Academy graduate. (Note: Mandy's grandparents, Richard and Lotte Cobb, were CIA assets who had sheltered Clark in East Berlin in 1985, as depicted in Red Winter) They go to Cartagena, Colombia to assist Yao's team as they track down Sabine through her younger sister Blanca Pakulova, who studies at the University of Cartagena. Edwards and Cobb later survive an attack from a pair of Camarilla operatives. Clark and his fellow Campus operatives then rescue Blanca from another pair of Camarilla operatives ordered by Sabine to kill her. Blanca informs them that her sister had left for Panama and that she is also known as the Spaniard, the leader of Camarilla.

President Ryan and Foley enter Panama via an unmarked Gulfstream III, with the former being greeted by Botero and vice president Lionel Carré and accompanied to Palacio de las Garzas in Panama City. Moncada finds out about the secret visit, which coincides with his coup, and informs Sabine. He sets off multiple explosions outside the presidential palace, killing Botero. Carré guides President Ryan and his Secret Service bodyguard to a secret tunnel where they meet Canto, who had arrived at the palace as Guerra hunts them down with Camarilla operatives disguised as presidential palace guards.

At the Panama Canal, Doyle detonates the Chinese container ship Jian Long at the Cocoli Locks in the south, allowing the Russian warships to reverse course for Panama City and disembark their troops to assist in the coup. Meanwhile, Sabine and her men ambush Foley on their way to the U.S. embassy, forcing her and her Secret Service bodyguard to retreat to the Metropolitan Natural Park. Her husband Ed survives an assassination attempt by a Russian agent ordered by Sabine and serves as an intermediary between her and Clark, who then gathers his Campus team and Yao's Ground Branch unit as they fly to Panama City.

Guerra finds President Ryan and Carré at the tunnel but is subdued by Canto and her deputy Alfredo "Fredi" Perez, ending the coup. Meanwhile, the Campus and Yao's team rescue Foley and kill Sabine. The U.S. Coast Guard national security cutter Munro forces the Russian warships to stand down and go back to their original westward course. Carré succeeds Botero as president of Panama and proceeds to a trilateral conference in Argentina with President Ryan and Russian president Yermilov, who agrees to turn over the Kremlin's files on Camarilla operatives. Doyle kills Moncada.

== Characters ==
=== United States government ===
- Jack Ryan, Sr.: President of the United States
- Cathy Ryan: First Lady
- Mark Dehart: Vice president of the United States
- Arnie van Damm: White House chief of staff
- Mary Pat Foley: Director of national intelligence
- Dan Murray: Attorney general
- Jay Canfield: Director of the CIA
- Scott Adler: Secretary of state
- Bob Burgess: Secretary of defense

=== Windward Station CIA operations officers ===
- Adam Yao
- Eric "Ripper" Ward
- James "Sal" Salazar
- Myrna Chaman
- Chris Nestor
- Al Lopez
- Ben "Boomer" Ramos
- Adrian Hernandez

=== United States Secret Service ===
- Gary Montgomery: Special agent in charge, presidential detail
- Maureen "Mo" Richardson: Special agent in charge, FLOTUS detail
- Keenan Mulvaney: Special agent in charge, vice presidential detail
- Brett Johnson: Special agent in charge, director of national intelligence detail

=== The Campus ===
- John Clark: Director of operations
- Domingo "Ding" Chavez: Assistant director of operations
- Dominic "Dom" Caruso: Operator
- Jack Ryan, Jr.: Operator
- Lisanne Robertson: Operator
- Adara Sherman: Operator
- Bartosz "Midas" Jankowski: Operator
- Steven "Chilly" Edwards: Operator
- Amanda "Mandy" Cobb: Operator

=== Panama ===
- Rafael Botero: President of Panama
- Lionel Carré: Vice president of Panama
- Gabriella Canto: Major, National Police of Panama (PNP)
- Alfredo "Fredi" Perez: Canto's driver (PNP)

=== Other characters ===
- Javier Guerra: Commissioner, National Police of Panama (PNP)
- Fabian Pinto: Guerra's driver (PNP)
- Felix Moncada: Botero's trusted economic adviser
- Joaquín Fernando Gorshkov: Venezuelan-Russian assassin
- Sabine Gorshkova: Joaquín's older sister
- Blanca Gorshkova, aka Blanca Pakulova: Joaquín's younger sister
- Hector Alonso: Joaquín's adopted guardian
- Admiral Kozlov: Commander, Northern Fleet, Russian Navy
- Alejandro Berugatte: Indigenous Embera Panama Canal pilot
- Vladimir Rykov: Captain of the Russian destroyer Admiral Chabanenko
- Pagodin: Captain of the Russian landing vessel Ivan Gren
- Commander Rick "Seldom" Wright: MH-6 Little Bird pilot

== Reception ==
=== Commercial ===
Chain of Command did not chart on the New York Times bestseller list on its initial release, a first for a Jack Ryan novel since The Hunt for Red October in 1984. Instead, its paperback release charted at number four on the Mass Market Books category of the same list in December 2024.

=== Critical ===
Kirkus Reviews reviewed the novel: "Jack Ryan is in good hands with Cameron. There’s plenty of action for Clancy fans." Red Carpet Crash praised the book as "another great novel in the series" with an "action packed climax".
