= Red Winter (disambiguation) =

Red Winter is a 2022 techno-thriller novel by Marc Cameron.

Red Winter may also refer to:

- The Red Winter, 2014 novel by Henry H. Neff
- Red Winter Software, Russian computer game developer known for Dungelot
