= Oath of Office (novel) =

2018 thriller novel

- Author: Marc Cameron
- Audio read by: Scott Brick
- Language: English
- Series: Jack Ryan; The Campus
- Release number: 18
- Genre: Techno-thriller; Political thriller; Military fiction; Spy fiction; Realistic fiction
- Publisher: G.P. Putnam's Sons
- Publication date: November 27, 2018
- Publication place: United States
- Media type: Print (Hardcover), Audio, eBook
- Pages: 518
- ISBN: 9780735215955
- Preceded by: Power and Empire
- Followed by: Code of Honor

Oath of Office (stylized as Tom Clancy Oath of Office, Tom Clancy: Oath of Office, or Tom Clancy's Oath of Office in the United Kingdom) is a techno-thriller novel, written by Marc Cameron and published on November 27, 2018. It is his second book in the Jack Ryan series, which is part of the Ryanverse featuring characters created by Tom Clancy.

In the novel, President Ryan and The Campus deal with a sinister plot behind a series of protests in Iran, dubbed the Persian Spring. The book debuted at number eight on the New York Times bestseller list.

== Plot ==
In Iran, a series of protests break out between a group of dissidents led by Reza Kazem and the Iranian theocratic government in what is favorably dubbed by the international press as the "Persian Spring." However, Kazem's organization is revealed to be a proxy force for the Iranian government allied with rogue elements in the Russian GRU. The GRU steals two 51T6 anti-ballistic missiles (ABMs) from the Russian armory and then covertly provides it to Kazem through Portuguese arms dealer Urbano da Rocha. Nevertheless, Kazem uses the missiles for his own ends, intent on sending them to low Earth orbit and detonating them, causing the debris to destroy all the satellites at that altitude.

Meanwhile, U.S. President Jack Ryan has been dealing with a multitude of crises at home and abroad. A deadly strain of flu, as well as spring floods, occur across the country, and his political rival, Senator Michelle Chadwick, criticizes his policies using bot-planted fake news stories about him. Overseas, the United States embassy in Cameroon comes under siege from the Cameroonian government eager on arresting opposition leader General Mbida, who had taken refuge there, while Russia is plotting to stage an invasion of Ukraine disguised as a military exercise. Regarding the Persian Spring, President Ryan is the lone dissenting voice in the generally favorable opinion on the events in Iran due to his skepticism of Kazem.

Russian SVR officer Erik Dovzhenko has been coordinating with Islamic Revolutionary Guards Corps major Parviz Sassani in capturing and executing dissidents in Iran at great personal risk to himself since his lover Maryam Farhad is secretly allied with Kazem's organization. When Sassani finds out about Maryam and kills her, Dovzhenko decides to defect and flees the country out of guilt. Relentlessly pursued by the Iranian major, he flies to Afghanistan to warn Maryam's friend Ysabel Kashani, who works at the United Nations Office on Drugs and Crime (UNODC), that Sassani is hunting for him and her due to their connection to Maryam.

Ysabel then informs her ex-boyfriend Jack Ryan Jr., who is on the ground in Portugal with his fellow Campus operatives to monitor da Rocha and his French assassin Lucile Fournier, who had just struck a deal with a pair of Russian GRU officers. Jack and his cousin Dominic "Dom" Caruso travel to the Afghan city of Herat to meet Ysabel and Dovzhenko, only to be ambushed and abducted by Taliban opium smugglers critical of Ysabel's work shortly after arriving. Caruso barely escapes and contacts Campus operative John Clark before recuperating in the United States military base in Bagram.

After defusing the situation in Cameroon by blackmailing the Cameroonian president into withdrawing troops from the U.S. embassy there, President Ryan covertly sends the Secret Service to shadow Chadwick and protect her from imminent assassination due to the fake news stories. They manage to foil an attempt by SVR officer Elizaveta Bobkova, who was secretly tasked by the GRU. Meanwhile, in Herat, Jack, Ysabel, and Dovzhenko manage to dispatch their captors and travel all the way to neighboring Iran.

In Portugal, Clark and his fellow Campus operatives Domingo "Ding" Chavez, Barry "Midas" Jankowski, and Adara Sherman rescue da Rocha from the Russian GRU officers, who had double-crossed him on the missile deal and had killed Lucile. Da Rocha then tells them about the nuclear weapons, which Clark relays to President Ryan and later to his son. Now in Iran, Jack, Dovzhenko, and Ysabel talk to an Iranian nuclear scientist named Atash Yazdani for information about the missiles in exchange for treating his ill son, when Sassani tracks them down and attacks them. After a fistfight, Yazdani kills the Iranian major, and then agrees to help the trio by installing malware in the nuclear defense facility where he works in Mashhad, crashing the computer system there.

After Yazdani plants the malware, President Ryan orders the destruction of the Mashhad facility, which destroys all but one of the missiles. Jack, Ysabel, Dovzhenko, and Yazdani then pinpoint the location of the second missile to a nearby cave but fail to stop it from being launched into space. However, they locate Kazem and dispatch him there. Meanwhile, with the help of two scientists, President Ryan orders the change in the orbit of an American-owned satellite targeted by the missile, avoiding a collision.

Russia moves its troops out of Ukraine. Yazdani and his son are later transported out of the country. Dovzhenko becomes a double agent for the CIA and SVR, and Ysabel decides to work in Russia.

== Characters ==
=== United States government ===
- Jack Ryan: President of the United States
- Mary Pat Foley: Director of national intelligence
- Arnold van Damm: President Ryan's chief of staff
- Scott Adler: Secretary of state
- Robert Burgess: Secretary of defense
- Mark Dehart: Secretary of homeland security

=== The Campus ===
- Gerry Hendley: Director of The Campus and Hendley Associates
- John Clark: Director of operations
- Domingo "Ding" Chavez: Assistant director of operations
- Jack Ryan, Jr.: Operations officer and senior analyst
- Dominic "Dom" Caruso: Operations officer
- Adara Sherman: Operations officer
- Bartosz "Midas" Jankowski: Operations officer
- Gavin Biery: Director of information technology
- Lisanne Robertson: Director of transportation

=== Other characters ===
==== United States ====
- Dr. Cathy Ryan: First Lady of the United States
- Will Hyatt: U.S. Air Force Reaper pilot
- Michelle Chadwick: United States senator
- Randal van Orden: Professor of astrophysics, U.S. Naval Academy
- Alex Hardy: U.S. Naval Academy midshipman

==== Russia ====
- Nikita Yermilov: President of Russia
- Maksim Dudko: Yermilov's aide
- Erik Dovzhenko: Russian SVR officer stationed in Tehran
- Colonel Pavel Mikhailov: Antonov 124 pilot, Russian Air Force
- Elizaveta Bobkova: Russian SVR operative stationed in Washington, D.C.

==== Europe ====
- Hugo Gaspard: French arms dealer
- Lucile Fournier: French assassin
- Urbano da Rocha: Portuguese arms dealer

==== Iran ====
- Reza Kazem: Leader of the Persian Spring
- Ayatollah Ghorbani: Lesser Ayatollah in Iran's ruling council
- Parviz Sassani: Major, Islamic Revolutionary Guards Corps
- Maryam Farhad: Dovzhenko's Iranian girlfriend
- Ysabel Kashani: Iranian academic, Ryan Junior's former girlfriend as in Commander in Chief
- Atash Yazdani: Iranian aeronautical engineer
- Sahar Tabrizi: Iranian astrophysicist

==== Cameroon ====
- Chance Burlingame: U.S. ambassador to Cameroon
- Adin Carr: Diplomatic Security Service agent assigned to Cameroon
- François Njaya: President of Cameroon
- General Mbida: Cameroonian general
- Sarah Porter: Wife of deputy chief of mission, Cameroon
- Sean Jolivette: F/A-18 Hornet pilot, USS George H.W. Bush

== Development ==
In formulating the plot of Oath of Office, Cameron says that the Persian Spring plot came from his editor Tom Colgan. He added, "I chase my protagonist up a tree, then throw rocks at him. It’s my job to do that—no one wants to read about people strolling through daisies, readers want them picking their way barefoot through miles of broken glass." For research, Cameron visited the U.S. Naval Academy, the headquarters for the FBI and the United States Secret Service, and the White House, and talked to retired intelligence officers who had served in Iran.

== Reception ==
=== Commercial ===
The book debuted at number eight on the Combined Print and E-Book Fiction category of the New York Times bestseller list for the week of December 16, 2018, as well as number 12 on the Hardcover Fiction category of the same list. It charted at number five at the Mass Market Books category of the same list in December 2019.

=== Critical ===
The book received average reviews. Thriller novel reviewer The Real Book Spy hailed the book, saying: "Though the Campus members provide some sizzle, Cameron relies more on his deftly plotted, high-stakes scenarios — while further developing Tom Clancy’s beloved characters — to keep readers interested." New York Journal of Books' verdict on the novel is that “It’s pure entertainment that will keep you turning the pages until the blood’s all spilled, the bad guys are no more, and there’s nothing much left to say other than, Yes, Oath of Office does indeed tell a darned good story.”

On the other hand, Kirkus Reviews praised the novel as "an enjoyable read for Clancy fans", but stating: "Cameron’s storytelling is indistinguishable from the late Clancy’s, down to infodumps that bulk up what could be a much shorter novel." Publishers Weekly dismissed it as "so-so", saying that "Maybe, once Ryan has finished his term in office and can do more than sit resolute behind a desk, he will again excite readers."
