= Rules of Engagement (Larsen novel) =

2026 novel by Ward Larsen

- Authors: Ward Larsen
- Audio read by: Scott Brick
- Language: English
- Series: Jack Ryan
- Release number: 27
- Genre: Techno-thriller; Military fiction; Realistic fiction
- Publisher: G.P. Putnam's Sons
- Publication date: May 19, 2026
- Publication place: United States
- Media type: Print (Hardcover), Audio, eBook
- Pages: 448
- ISBN: 9780593718094
- Preceded by: Executive Power
- Followed by: The Coldest War

Rules of Engagement (stylized as Tom Clancy Rules of Engagement or Tom Clancy: Rules of Engagement) is a techno-thriller novel, written by Ward Larsen and published on May 19, 2026. It is his only entry in the Jack Ryan series, which is part of the Ryanverse featuring characters created by Tom Clancy.

In the novel, President Ryan uncovers a Russian conspiracy to disrupt the global oil trade after ordering the investigation of a plane crash in Turkey that killed a Cabinet member.

== Plot summary ==
A U.S. Air Force C-32A carrying the secretary of commerce crashes east of Bodrum, Turkey, killing everyone aboard. Its flight manifest included Swiss banker Gunther Klaus, who had worked with Andrei Malenkov, former head of Russian military intelligence (GRU)’s covert unit Department of Special Tasks (SSD). Klaus had made contact with the CIA in Tangier, Morocco a month ago with information about financing Malenkov’s mysterious operation at a desert airfield near Al-Jaghbub in Libya; his handler arranged for him to board the diplomatic plane carrying the commerce secretary.

U.S. President Jack Ryan sends Task Force 99, (Note: They have previously appeared in Defense Protocol as a multinational task force modeled on Rainbow) led by commander John Clark and his deputy Domingo “Ding” Chavez, to Bodrum, while Office of Naval Intelligence (ONI) analyst Katie Ryan, his youngest daughter, is assigned to the official crash investigation. After Katie learns that one person is missing from the plane’s casualties, her brother Kyle, a Defense Intelligence Agency (DIA) programmer working with their AI initiative Cyber Cell 6, is tasked to find out if the plane was targeted by meaconing and to determine the identity of the missing passenger, which turns out to be Klaus.

Katie’s ONI colleague John Conza accompanies the Turkish military as they investigate the meaconing angle by searching for suspected vehicles around the crash site. Their Black Hawk helicopter is shot down by a surface-to-air missile from a three-car convoy, who capture Conza. They are tracked by Cyber Cell 6’s AI program, which enables Task Force 99 to pursue and intercept the convoy in neighboring Georgia. They rescue Conza and recover the meaconing hardware, a satellite countermeasure device stolen from a Russian defense contractor. Clark interrogates the convoy’s Russian leader, who confirms that Malenkov ordered them to shoot down the plane in order to eliminate Klaus, who escaped at the last minute.

Meanwhile, Klaus is identified by Cyber Cell 6 in Tangiers as Malenkov sends GRU agents to capture him. Katie joins Kyle as they identify Klaus’s rendezvous point at La Corniche, where Task Force 99 extracts Klaus from the surrounding GRU agents. The banker reveals to Clark that Malenkov is planning to release radioactive cesium chloride from Iranian Shahed drones into the Suez Canal, an important oil trade route, and has invested in oil markets to profit from the attack.

Task Force 99 attempts a flyby of the airfield in Al-Jaghbub but are forced to land there after taking fire from Malenkov and his mercenaries. President Ryan orders the experimental Hyperion hypersonic missile to be deployed with a payload of highly advanced killer drone swarms from the USS Zumwalt to secure the airfield, killing Malenkov. However, Clark and his team discover that Malenkov's drones have already launched. A group of U.S. Navy F/A-18 Hornets are deployed from the USS Gerald R. Ford to intercept the drones, which are then shot down into the Mediterranean Sea. The attack was revealed to have been ordered by Russian president Nikita Yermilov in an attempt to forestall his country’s imminent economic collapse.

== Characters ==
=== Washington, D.C. ===
- Jack Ryan: President of the United States
- Arnold "Arnie" van Damm: White House chief of staff
- Mary Pat Foley: Director of national intelligence
- Scott Adler: Secretary of state
- Robert Burgess: Secretary of defense
- Admiral Lawrence Kent, USN: Chairman of the Joint Chiefs of Staff
- Ben Stephens: Director of the CIA

=== Russia ===
- Nikita Yermilov: President of Russia
- General Gennady Vasin: Head of the GRU

=== Al-Jaghbub Airfield ===
- Andrei Malenkov: Former head of the SSD
- Gamling: Drone technician
- Omar Qasim: Physicist

=== Crash Investigation Team ===
- Colonel Thomas Carter, USAF: Lead investigator
- Lieutenant Commander Katie Ryan: ONI
- Lieutenant John “JC” Conza: ONI

=== Task Force 99 ===
- John Clark: Task force leader
- Domingo "Ding" Chavez: Deputy task force leader
- Lee Hyori: South Korean Navy Special Warfare Flotilla (WARFLOT) officer
- Wilhelm Bauer: German Federal Intelligence Service (BND) officer
- Daniel Wu: Chinese-born Special Boat Service (SBS) officer
- Charlotte "Charlie" Adams: Australian Special Air Service Regiment (SAS) intelligence officer
- Henri Toussaint: French General Directorate for Internal Security (DGSI) officer

=== Other characters ===
- Kyle Ryan: DIA, Cyber Cell 6
- Mustafa “Moose” Hosny: DIA, Cyber Cell 6
- David Craterly: DIA, Cyber Cell 6
- Intel Specialist Second Class “Bubba” Pettigrew: ONI

=== USS Gerald R. Ford ===
- Commander Dale “Lava” Harrison: Glock 21
- Lieutenant Mike “Id” Ayotte: Glock 22
- Lieutenant Commander Tom “Spanx” Hahn: Glock 23
- Lieutenant Junior Grade James “Gooch” Whittemore: Glock 24

== Development ==
In an interview with WECT, Larsen spoke about working on Rules of Engagement: “I kind of limited the number of characters that were involved in this. It’s such a wide, wide universe, and those that I did use were the ones I was kind of comfortable with. I also had to go back and research some things...I had to be careful because there is a very dedicated fan base and there are guys and women who know more about the Clancy universe than I do. It was a challenge. But yeah, I stayed within what I knew."

== Critical reception ==
Kirkus Reviews reviewed the book: "American honor, high-tech power, and on-the-ground bravery highlight this exciting yarn." The Real Book Spy praised Larsen, stating that he "didn’t just survive his first trip into the Ryanverse—he delivered one of the strongest recent entries in the franchise" while adding: "Fast, timely, and packed with adrenaline, Tom Clancy Rules of Engagement is the kind of high-octane technothriller that proves Jack Ryan still has plenty of fight left in him." Teresa Brock of Best Thriller Books also praised Larsen: "He stays true to the heart of the Ryanverse while bringing a fresh rhythm and edge that feels modern, urgent, and fearless."
