= Jack Ryan (character) =

Fictional character created by author Tom Clancy

- Ryanverse character
- Alec Baldwin as Jack Ryan in The Hunt for Red October.
- First appearance: The Hunt for Red October (1984)
- Created by: Tom Clancy
- Portrayed by: Alec Baldwin (1990); Harrison Ford (1992–1994); Ben Affleck (2002); Chris Pine (2014); John Krasinski (2018–2026)

In-universe information
- Occupation: U.S. President, U.S. Vice President, National Security Advisor, Deputy Director of the Central Intelligence Agency, CIA Acting Deputy Director for Intelligence, CIA Special Assistant to the DDI, CIA Analyst, Professor, US Naval Academy, Certified Public Accountant and Stockbroker, USMC Second Lieutenant
- Family: Emmet William Ryan (father, deceased); Catherine Burke Ryan (mother, deceased); Dominic "Dom" Caruso (nephew); Brian Caruso (nephew, deceased)
- Spouse: Caroline "Cathy" Ryan (Mueller)
- Children: Olivia Barbara "Sally" Ryan; John Patrick "Jack" Ryan Jr.; Kathleen "Katie" Ryan; Kyle Daniel Ryan
- Religion: Catholic Church

John Patrick "Jack" Ryan is a character created by American author Tom Clancy in 1984. He is the main character of the Ryanverse series of novels, films, video games, and a TV series. Clancy wrote fourteen novels featuring Ryan, which have charted at the top of the New York Times bestseller list.

A former U.S. Marine lieutenant and stockbroker, Ryan worked as a civilian history professor at the United States Naval Academy. He became an analyst working for the Central Intelligence Agency during the Cold War. He goes up the ranks at the CIA, eventually becoming Deputy Director. After a brief retirement, Ryan served as National Security Advisor and Vice President before becoming President of the United States following a terrorist attack at the United States Capitol. He went on to serve two non-consecutive terms and mostly dealt with international crises in Europe, South America, and Asia.

Since Clancy's death in 2013, there have been other authorized writers of novels featuring Ryan, including Mark Greaney, Marc Cameron, Andrews and Wilson, and Ward Larsen. Additionally, a spin-off series featuring Ryan's son Jack Junior was written by Grant Blackwood, Mike Maden, Don Bentley, M. P. Woodward, and Jack Stewart.

Ryan has been portrayed in adaptations by actors Alec Baldwin, Harrison Ford, Ben Affleck, Chris Pine, and John Krasinski. The film series from 1990 to 2014 have an unadjusted worldwide gross revenue of $788.4 million to date, making it the 57th-highest-grossing film series. A television series from Amazon Prime Video ran from 2018 to 2023, followed by a feature film in 2026.

== Concept and creation ==
Clancy developed the Jack Ryan character while working as an insurance agent in Maryland, drawing extensively from his early interests and personal background. Clancy, who grew up in an Irish-American family in Baltimore and was unable to serve in the military due to nearsightedness, developed a passion for military history and strategy from an early age. He was described as a "nerd" who enjoyed playing military board games and was an avid reader of military history books and science fiction.

The author's research methodology became central to his character and world-building process. Many of Clancy's insurance clients were former nuclear submariners, both officers and enlisted personnel, whose expertise he systematically gathered. He conducted extensive research using military publications such as Armed Forces Weekly and Jane's Defence Weekly, and collaborated with subject experts ranging from Soviet defectors to retired Air Force generals. Clancy based his first novel on the real-life attempted defection of the crew of the Soviet frigate Storozhevoy to Sweden.

According to character sketches discovered by the U.S. Naval Institute, Clancy originally envisioned Ryan as born in the 1950s, the son of a Baltimore police officer and hospital nurse. The character was designed to attend Clancy's own alma mater, Loyola High School, and earn an economics degree from Boston College before joining the United States Marine Corps. The detailed background included Ryan's career path from a helicopter crash injury during military service, through work at Merrill, to eventual recruitment by the CIA while working as an associate editor with the U.S. Naval Institute.

The character of Jack Ryan was modeled partly on former Director of Central Intelligence Robert Gates, with Clancy telling Gates that "You know, for the first several novels, I pretty much modeled Ryan's career on yours". This grounding in real-world intelligence careers helped establish the series' commitment to authenticity in depicting government operations and military technology.

== Background ==
=== Early life ===
Ryan was born on May 17, 1950, to an Irish Catholic family in Baltimore, Maryland. His father, Emmett William Ryan, was a homicide lieutenant for the Baltimore Police Department and World War II veteran, while his mother, Catherine Burke Ryan, was a nurse. Ryan also had a younger sister who lived in Seattle.

After graduating from Boston College with a bachelor's degree in economics, (Note: As depicted in The Cardinal of the Kremlin) Ryan became a lieutenant with the United States Marine Corps while also passing the Certified Public Accountant exam. However, his military career was cut short after three months when his platoon's helicopter crashed during a NATO exercise over Crete, which badly injured his back. After a lengthy recovery process where he became addicted to pain medications, Ryan was discharged from the Marine Corps. He later took a position with Merrill at its Baltimore office.

Ryan's parents died in a plane crash at Chicago Midway International Airport 19 months after his crash in Crete. He developed a fear of flying that persisted for years. (Note: As depicted in Patriot Games)

=== Civilian career ===
As a stockbroker, Ryan began to invest his own money. He meets Caroline "Cathy" Muller, then a medical student at Johns Hopkins University School of Medicine, through her father Joe, a senior vice president at Merrill. They fall in love and get engaged. Cathy becomes an ophthalmic surgeon at the Wilmer Eye Institute of the Johns Hopkins. Jack and Cathy get married and give birth to a daughter Olivia, nicknamed Sally.

After creating a net worth of $8 million, Ryan left Merrill after four years and studied at Georgetown University, later graduating with a doctorate degree. After a brief stint at the Center for Strategic and International Studies, he accepted a position at the U.S. Naval Academy as a civilian professor of history. As a history professor, Ryan wrote books on naval history, including a biography of World War II Admiral William "Bull" Halsey. (Note: As depicted in The Hunt for Red October)

=== CIA career ===
Ryan was first asked to work as a consultant for the Central Intelligence Agency. He wrote a paper called Agents and Agencies and devised the canary trap, which come to the attention of U.S. Navy Vice Admiral James Greer, the CIA's Deputy Director of Intelligence. Greer offers Ryan a job, which he initially declined.

==== Patriot Games (1987) ====
Harrison Ford portrayed Jack Ryan in the film adaptation of Patriot Games.

While on a work trip in London with his family, Ryan (played by Harrison Ford in the film adaptation) thwarts a kidnapping attempt on the Prince and Princess of Wales by the Ulster Liberation Army, a splinter group of the Provisional Irish Republican Army. For his bravery, he is granted the honorary Knight Commander of the Royal Victorian Order by Queen Elizabeth II. One of the ULA attackers, Sean Miller, was captured and sentenced to life imprisonment, but is freed by his compatriots. Embittered over the failure of the kidnapping attempt, he exacts revenge by attacking Ryan's wife and daughter. After pleas by Greer, Ryan agrees to join the CIA as an analyst, originally to gather intelligence on the ULA. Later, Miller and his men stage another kidnapping attempt on the Prince and Princess of Wales, who are visiting the Ryan family in their Maryland home; however, they are overpowered by the combined efforts of Ryan, his friend Robert Jefferson "Robby" Jackson, and the Prince as well as law enforcement and naval officers. Shortly after, Ryan's second child Jack Ryan Jr. was born.

==== Red Rabbit (1982) ====
Ryan's first CIA assignment is in London as a member of a liaison group to the British Secret Intelligence Service. Initially called in to assess the Soviet government and economy, Ryan is later tasked to assist in the defection of KGB communications officer Oleg Zaitzev, who had discovered that his boss Yuri Andropov had ordered the assassination of Pope John Paul II. Although Ryan and a small team of British SIS agents helps Zaitzev and his family get to the West, they fail to prevent the attack on the Pope (which happened in real life). Nevertheless, the pope is wounded and his would-be assassin captured, while the British execute his Bulgarian handler. Zaitzev's defection proves to be a major coup for both the American and British intelligence agencies.

==== The Hunt for Red October (1984) ====
Marko Ramius, the Soviet Navy's top submarine commander, takes command of the Красный Октябрь (Krasny Oktyabr, or in English, Red October), the newest Typhoon-class ballistic missile submarine, with which he plans to defect with his officers. Having briefly met Ramius at an embassy function several years before, Ryan (portrayed by Alec Baldwin in the film adaptation) is asked by Admiral Greer to brief National Security Advisor Jeffrey Pelt and his staff on Ramius' background and the deadly new capabilities of Red October's secret revolutionary silent jet propulsion drive system called the caterpillar drive. Ryan recognizes that the renegade ethnic Lithuanian captain may want to defect rather than attack the West. Ryan works to establish contact with Ramius and get him and his crew along with the submarine secretly into the U.S., eventually succeeding.

The prequel novel Red Winter (2022), written by Marc Cameron and set after the events of Red October, focuses on Ryan and CIA officer Mary Pat Foley as they are tasked with investigating a possible East German defector.

==== The Cardinal of the Kremlin (1986) ====
Ryan is reassigned to the CIA headquarters at Langley and becomes Admiral Greer's special assistant. He is sent to Moscow as part of the American nuclear weapons reduction (START) team, and later engineers the extraction of CARDINAL, the CIA's highest agent-in-place, from the country. Ryan also forces KGB chairman Nikolay Gerasimov to defect due to his anti-American nature, which could jeopardize the arms reduction talks once he becomes General Secretary.

==== Clear and Present Danger (1988) ====
Ryan (portrayed by Harrison Ford in the film adaptation) is promoted to acting deputy director of Intelligence when Greer is hospitalized with cancer. He realizes he is being kept in the dark about covert CIA operations to disrupt the illegal drug trade in Colombia, which involves inserting light infantry troops of Hispanic descent, intercepting drug flights, and surveillance of drug cartel management. When the American troops are later betrayed to avoid the political fallout, Ryan works with the FBI to rescue them. He also meets CIA operative John Clark, with whom he would become friends.

==== The Sum of All Fears (1991) ====
Ryan (portrayed by Ben Affleck in the film adaptation) becomes Deputy Director of the Central Intelligence Agency. His career is jeopardized when J. Robert Fowler becomes President and his lover Elizabeth Elliott becomes National Security Advisor. They not only deny Ryan any credit for an innovative Middle East peace plan, but also panic when Palestinian and former East German terrorists detonate a nuclear bomb in Denver during the Super Bowl and nearly plunge the world into a Soviet-American nuclear war. Ryan defuses the nuclear crisis by commandeering the Moscow-Washington hotline and convincing the Soviet leader that the crisis is a setup. He then refuses to confirm Fowler's order to launch a nuclear missile at Qom, where the Iranian Ayatollah Mahmoud Haji Daryaei lives. After Fowler resigns, Ryan retires from the CIA.

==== Debt of Honor (1994) ====
Two years later, Ryan returns to government service as National Security Advisor under President Roger Durling. They deal with war against Japan, which includes an attack on America's economic infrastructure. After a clean sweep of Japan's forces in the South Pacific, Vice President Ed Kealty is forced to resign after a sex scandal. President Durling taps Ryan for the job, which he accepts on the condition that he will only serve until the end of Durling's term. However, a Japanese airline pilot crashes a 747 into the U.S. Capitol building during Congress's joint session, killing most of the people inside, decapitating the U.S. government, and elevating Ryan to the presidency.

=== First Ryan administration ===
==== Executive Orders (1996) ====
As President Ryan slowly rebuilds the government, he deals with Kealty's challenge to his legitimacy. Initially the lone voice of opposition to President Ryan's policies that cut through bureaucracy and political infighting, Kealty later gathers classified information on Ryan from his time in the CIA and enlists NBC news anchor Tom Donner to ambush President Ryan with questions about his CIA career in a televised interview. Donner's colleague John Plumber later realizes his mistake and publicly apologizes to President Ryan, while Kealty's challenge ultimately fails in court.

President Ryan also deals with Daryaei, who had taken over Iraq and combined it with Iran to form the United Islamic Republic. Taking advantage of his inexperience, the Ayatollah stages a multi-pronged attack on the United States: a biological attack using a weaponized strain of the Ebola virus, a kidnapping attempt on his youngest daughter Katie, and an assassination attempt through an Iranian sleeper agent disguised as a Secret Service bodyguard; with the U.S. overwhelmed by a multitude of crises, he believes that he can invade Saudi Arabia with little military opposition from the U.S. While the attempt on Katie was swiftly averted by the FBI and the Secret Service, the Ebola epidemic causes President Ryan to declare martial law and enforce a travel ban that becomes instrumental in killing the virus, since it cannot survive in the American environment due to its fragile nature; the would-be assassin is lured to the Oval Office and arrested by the FBI.

President Ryan deploys what is left of the American military to assist Saudi and Kuwaiti forces in repelling the UIR military, which also becomes successful. He orders Daryaei killed in a surgical airstrike in Tehran as he announces the Ryan Doctrine, which states that the U.S. will no longer tolerate attacks on "our territory, our possessions, or our citizens," and will hold whoever orders such attacks accountable.

==== The Bear and the Dragon (2000) ====
President Ryan completes Durling's term as president and is reelected as an Independent. He retains most of his emergency Cabinet and has appointed Robby Jackson as his vice president. Along the way, President Ryan deals with the attempted assassination of his former KGB counterpart Sergey Golovko, now the head of Russian foreign intelligence (SVR). This turns out to be an attempt by the China to sow confusion in the Russian government due to their plan to annex Eastern Siberia, where geologists had recently discovered oil and gold reserves. President Ryan persuades Russia to join NATO in a futile attempt to deter China, and in the subsequent war that follows, he deploys U.S. forces to assist the Russian military and target Chinese strategic assets.

Ryan does not appear in The Teeth of the Tiger (2003), but is said to have completed his presidential term. Jackson campaigns to become his successor but is assassinated by a Ku Klux Klan member in Mississippi, enabling Kealty to become the next president by default. Before Ryan leaves office, he creates The Campus, a covert counter-terrorism and intelligence organization that fronts as Hendley Associates, a financial trading firm, and also writes 100 preemptive presidential pardons for its members.

=== Second Ryan administration ===
In Dead or Alive (2010), Ryan decides to come out of retirement and run for president as a Republican, citing his disappointment with President Kealty's policies. He campaigns against him in Locked On (2011) and wins the election, overcoming Czech billionaire Paul Laska's attempts to discredit him by labeling his longtime friend Clark as a fugitive and implicating him by association.

In his second administration, President Ryan has mostly dealt with crises in China (Threat Vector, Power and Empire, Code of Honor, Shadow of the Dragon, Defense Protocol), Russia (Command Authority, Commander in Chief, Act of Defiance, Rules of Engagement), North Korea (Full Force and Effect), and Iran (Oath of Office). He has also dealt with the Islamic State (True Faith and Allegiance), an Indian billionaire who attempts to intimidate him into repealing a protectionist bill (Chain of Command), and coups in Panama (Command and Control) and Angola (Executive Power). In addition, President Ryan's Cabinet is composed of recurring characters such as White House Chief of Staff Arnie van Damm, director of national intelligence Mary Pat Foley, and secretary of state Scott Adler.

President Ryan has also made appearances in the Jack Junior series of novels, which feature his son as an analyst and field operative for The Campus. His other children Katie and Kyle have also featured in recent Ryanverse novels as members of the United States military.

== Ryan Doctrine ==
At the end of Executive Orders, Ryan, in the tradition of Presidents Monroe, Truman, Carter and Reagan, issues a foreign policy doctrine which largely defines his administration's international perspective. The Ryan Doctrine states that the U.S. will no longer tolerate attacks on "our territory, our possessions, or our citizens," and will hold whoever orders such attacks accountable.

This statement comes soon after the Ebola attack on the U.S. ordered by Daryaei. Ryan announces the new doctrine on television, momentarily cutting away to show Daryaei and his UIR advisors being incinerated by laser-guided bombs launched from two F-117s, on Ryan's orders. Therefore, the Ryan doctrine supersedes the executive order put in place by President Ford, which forbids the assassination of foreign heads of state. Ryan, however, believes it is a more ethical alternative than total war, since it punishes the person responsible for the attack instead of the people he rules.

Within the books, the Ryan doctrine is not officially invoked after Daryaei's death (although Ryan threatens to use it on the Chinese leadership in The Bear and the Dragon, should anything happen to American citizens living in China as a consequence of the Siberian War).

== Adaptations ==
=== Films ===
Six films based on Clancy novels featuring Jack Ryan have been produced. Jack Ryan was portrayed by Alec Baldwin in the 1990 film The Hunt for Red October, Harrison Ford in Patriot Games (1992) and Clear and Present Danger (1994), Ben Affleck in the 2002 film The Sum of All Fears, and Chris Pine in 2014 film Jack Ryan: Shadow Recruit. He is also portrayed by John Krasinski in the 2026 film Jack Ryan: Ghost War.

In the novels, Patriot Games occurs before The Hunt for Red October, though the order was reversed in the film versions. Additionally, The Sum of All Fears is not part of the Baldwin/Ford series, but rather an intended reboot of the franchise which departs significantly from the chronology of the novels. It takes place in 2002, whereas the novel takes place in 1991/1992. Jack Ryan: Shadow Recruit is a second reboot of the franchise and departs from all previous films. Jack Ryan: Ghost War is a continuation of the Amazon Prime series of the same name.

- The Hunt for Red October (1990)
- Patriot Games (1992)
- Clear and Present Danger (1994)
- The Sum of All Fears (2002)
- Jack Ryan: Shadow Recruit (2014)
- Jack Ryan: Ghost War (2026)

=== Television ===
John Krasinski as Ryan in the Amazon Prime series of the same name.

John Krasinski portrays Jack Ryan in the series of the same name for Amazon Prime Video, released in August 2018, consisting of four seasons. Krasinski also serves as an executive producer of the show. His portrayal is inspired by the Harrison Ford Jack Ryan films.

=== Video games ===
Several video games based on the series have been made, some based on the novels, others on the films and spin-offs.

- The Hunt for Red October (1987)
- The Hunt for Red October (1990)
- The Sum of All Fears (2002)

== See also ==
- John Clark
- List of fictional U.S. Presidents
