= Executive Orders =

1996 thriller novel by Tom Clancy

- First edition cover
- Author: Tom Clancy
- Language: English
- Series: Jack Ryan
- Release number: 7
- Genre: Techno-thriller; Political thriller; Military fiction; Medical fiction; Realistic fiction
- Publisher: G.P. Putnam's Sons
- Publication date: July 1, 1996
- Publication place: United States
- Media type: Print (Hardcover, Paperback)
- Pages: 874
- ISBN: 0399142185
- Preceded by: Debt of Honor
- Followed by: The Bear and the Dragon

Executive Orders is a techno-thriller novel, written by Tom Clancy and released on July 1, 1996. It picks up immediately where the final events of Debt of Honor (1994) left off, and features now-U.S. President Jack Ryan as he deals with foreign and domestic threats. The book is dedicated to former U.S. President Ronald Reagan, who helped launch Clancy's worldwide success as a novelist. The book debuted at number one on the New York Times bestseller list.

== Plot ==
After a terrorist attack kills nearly every U.S. executive, legislative, and judicial figure, previously-confirmed Vice President Jack Ryan has been sworn in as President of the United States. As Ryan is left to represent the United States by himself, he must deal with multiple crises: reconstituting his own Cabinet, the House, the Senate, and the entire Supreme Court; a challenge to the legitimacy of his succession by former Vice President Ed Kealty, leading to press hazing; and a war brewing in the Middle East.

When the Iraqi president (implied to be Saddam Hussein) is assassinated by an Iranian deep-cover agent, Iranian leader Ayatollah Mahmoud Haji Daryaei takes advantage of the power vacuum by launching an unopposed invasion of Iraq and later uniting it with his country, calling the new entity the "United Islamic Republic" (UIR). Daryaei then secretly unleashes a master plan of "weakening" the United States through a series of terrorist attacks: a biological attack in the country using a weaponized strain of Ebola virus, a kidnapping attempt of Ryan's youngest daughter Katie, and an assassination attempt on the President himself by a Secret Service bodyguard who is an Iranian sleeper agent.

China and India secretly assist Daryaei, first by causing a diplomatic crisis between the Chinese mainland and Taiwan when a PLAAF aircraft "accidentally" shoots down a Taiwanese airliner. The incident pulls a U.S. Navy carrier group from the Indian Ocean to the South China Sea and allows the Indian Navy's carrier up to move undetected to the Strait of Hormuz, cutting off access to the only sea-bound pathway to the UIR and Saudi Arabia. Daryaei thinks that with the U.S. government and military overwhelmed by a multitude of crises, he is now free to invade Saudi Arabia and claim superpower status for the UIR.

The attack on Ryan's daughter as well as the assassination attempt on the President are swiftly averted by the FBI and Secret Service. However, the Ebola epidemic causes Ryan to declare martial law and enforce a travel ban to contain the virus. The epidemic later burns out due to the virus being so fragile that it cannot spread effectively. Meanwhile, CIA operatives John Clark and Domingo Chavez are tasked with investigating the origin of the virus in Africa, where they later discover Daryaei's involvement, connecting the puzzle of seemingly unrelated global crises. Ryan then deploys what is left of the United States military (the virus immobilized almost the entire military apparatus except for one fighter wing, two armored cavalry regiments, and one National Guard armor brigade that had been training at isolated Fort Irwin) to assist Saudi and Kuwaiti military forces in repelling a UIR invasion of Saudi Arabia.

The tide soon turns against the UIR, with its forces obliterated by the combined firepower of the United States, Saudi Arabia, and Kuwait. President Ryan had sent Clark and Chavez into Tehran, the de facto capital of the UIR, to target Daryaei with assistance from Russian intelligence. The Ayatollah is later killed in his residence by precision-guided munitions dropped from F-117 Nighthawks. Ryan then threatens to launch a tactical nuclear strike on Tehran unless those responsible for the attacks are immediately extradited to the U.S. to face charges, and the facility where the weaponized Ebola was cultured is neutralized. He announces a new foreign policy doctrine, the "Ryan Doctrine", under which the United States will hold personally accountable any foreign leader who orders attacks on U.S. citizens, territory, or possessions in the future.

Kealty's challenge to Ryan's legitimacy fails in court; due to the way Kealty's legal complaint was worded, the federal judge who hears the case inadvertently confirms that Ryan is the President. In the aftermath of the crisis, public appreciation of the unelected president grows.

== Characters ==
=== The United States government ===
- Jack Ryan: President of the United States
- Scott Adler: Acting secretary of state
- George Winston: Acting secretary of the treasury
- Patrick "Pat" Martin: Acting attorney general
- Tony Bretano: Acting secretary of defense
- Arnold van Damm: President Ryan's chief of staff
- Ben Goodley: National Security Advisor to President Ryan
- Dan Murray: Acting director of the FBI
- Pat O'Day: FBI "roving inspector" working under Murray
- Andrea Price: Chief of the United States Secret Service detail
- Aref "Jeff" Raman: Special agent for the Secret Service who is an Iranian sleeper agent assigned to assassinate Ryan
- Bert Vasco: Senior desk officer for Iraq, U.S. State Department

=== Central Intelligence Agency ===
- Ed Foley: Acting Director of Central Intelligence
- Mary Pat Foley: Deputy Director of Operations
- John Clark: Operations officer
- Domingo "Ding" Chavez: Operations officer

=== The United States military ===
- Robby Jackson: Director of operations (J-3) for the Joint Chiefs of Staff
- Brigadier General Marion Diggs: Commander of the Fort Irwin National Training Center in California, later the senior U.S. commander in the American effort in Saudi Arabia
- Al Hamm: Commander of the 11th Armored Cavalry Regiment at Fort Irwin working under General Diggs
- Colonel Nick Eddington: Commander of the North Carolina Army National Guard's 30th Heavy Brigade later deployed to Saudi Arabia
- Major General John Pickett: Commanding officer of the United States Army Medical Research Institute of Infectious Diseases

=== The United Islamic Republic ===
- Ayatollah Mahmoud Haji Daryaei: Leader of Iran. Having previously met Ryan in the novel The Sum of All Fears, he underestimates him as out of his element and seizes the opportunity to turn Iran into a superpower, destabilizing the United States in the process.
- Ali Badrayn: Daryaei's trusted advisor
- Dr. Mohammed Moudi: Iranian physician with the World Health Organization who is an agent for the Iranian government, discovering a strain of the Ebola virus in Zaire and weaponizing it.
- "Movie Star": Terrorist with ties to Badrayn who is in charge of the kidnapping attempt on Ryan's daughter Katie

=== Other characters ===
- Ed Kealty: Former Vice President of the United States who tries to sabotage Ryan's legitimacy as the United States's chief executive
- Cathy Ryan: First Lady of the United States and associate professor of the ophthalmology department at Johns Hopkins University School of Medicine
- Kathleen "Katie" Ryan: Jack and Cathy Ryan's youngest daughter
- Sergey Golovko: Chairman of the Russian Foreign Intelligence Service (SVR)
- Gennady Bondarenko: General-Lieutenant for the Russian Ground Forces and Golovko's trusted advisor
- Prime Minister of India (unnamed): She regards Ryan as weak and later agrees to an alliance with the UIR and China in order to continue with her plans to take over Sri Lanka, later backing out when Ryan threatens her with retaliation if Indian Navy ships, blockading the Strait of Hormuz, interfere with the U.S. surface group approaching the Persian Gulf through the strait.
- Zhang Han San: Chinese senior diplomat with imperialistic motives who allies with Daryaei
- Pierre Alexandre: Former U.S. Army colonel who becomes an associate professor of the infectious diseases department at Johns Hopkins University School of Medicine. He is later appointed Surgeon General of the United States by Ryan for his efforts in handling the Ebola epidemic.
- Augustus "Gus" Lorenz: Special pathogens branch head for the Centers for Disease Control and Prevention in Atlanta
- Ralph Forster: Head of the infectious diseases department at the Johns Hopkins University School of Medicine
- Tom Donner: Television anchor for NBC who is suborned by Kealty into ambushing Ryan in a televised interview. He later apologizes to Ryan after covering a battle in Saudi Arabia as part of the press pool.
- John Plumber: A television commentator working with Donner who is also critical of Ryan, but later publicly admits to sabotaging Ryan's interview in the name of journalistic integrity.
- Bob Holtzman: Senior White House correspondent for The Washington Post
- Peter Holbrook: An anti-government extremist ("Mountain Men") who plots to kill Ryan by using a cement truck loaded with explosives. He is later arrested by the police.
- Ernest Brown: Holbrook's accomplice who is also arrested.
- Sister Jean Baptiste: A nun working as a nurse in a hospital in Zaire who contracts Ebola from a patient. Dr. Moudi later extracts the Ebola virus from her and weaponizes it.
- Dr. Ian MacGregor: A doctor in Sudan who treats Sohaila and Saleh, two Iraqis who had contracted Ebola while being secretly transported from their home country before it merged with Iran to form the UIR.

== Themes ==
The novel is composed of three major storylines. The first part is a realistic portrait about being the President of the United States, with "a near fetishistic pleasure out of detailing the ways in which [the chief executive] is robbed of his private life every minute of the day", according to novelist Marc Cerasini's essay on the book. The second part is about domestic critics and enemies — "venal politicos, fat cats, and corrupt media types", according to Publishers Weekly's review of the novel — that cause problems for President Ryan as he tries to rebuild the entire U.S. government with his centre-right politics and his grassroots American values. The third part features the United Islamic Republic's quest to become a superpower, which turns the novel into a "taut and harrowing" medical thriller that culminates in a military confrontation on land, sea, and air that is regarded as callback to Clancy's war novel Red Storm Rising (1986).

Clancy also discusses whether political outsiders, in this case Jack Ryan himself, are better reformers than those who have worked within the system, a theme explored in movies like Mr. Smith Goes to Washington (1939) and Dave (1993).

== Release ==
Promoted by publishing company Putnam in an $800,000 marketing campaign that pitched Jack Ryan as running for president, Executive Orders sold 56,000 copies in its first week at Barnes & Noble. It eventually sold 2.3 million copies.

== Reception ==
=== Commercial ===
The book debuted at number one on the New York Times bestseller list. It also debuted at number one on the USA Today's Best-selling Books list for the week of August 22, 1996.

=== Critical ===
The book received generally positive reviews. Publishers Weekly praised Clancy as "a war-gamer without peer, and his plotting here is masterful, as is his strumming of patriotic heartstrings"; they concluded: "This is heavyweight entertainment, and come pub date it's going to be the world champion of the bestseller lists." The Washington Post hailed the novel as "compelling entertainment", explaining: "[it] shows that, despite the end of the Cold War and the temptation to coast that conventional success may bring, Clancy has lost none of his verve. As cultural artifact, the book suggests a domestic America that is perilous and grim." In a mixed review written by Oliver Stone for The New York Times, Stone praised Clancy's "fiendishly inventive" plotting and "a technically sharp command of the realistic detail"; however, he criticized its length, questioning whether Clancy's works are edited or kept in their place: "Realism comes at the expense of the story's flow, and here I must ask whether anyone actually edits Mr. Clancy, or for that matter whether there is any living workaholic who actually reads every cybernetic paragraph, with its obligatory expressions of grief, anger, fear and that little bit of love that in Mr. Clancy's world can be taken to mean responsibility."

== See also ==
- Assassinations in fiction
