= True Faith and Allegiance =

2016 novel by Mark Greaney

- Author: Mark Greaney
- Audio read by: Scott Brick
- Language: English
- Series: Jack Ryan; The Campus
- Release number: 16
- Genre: Political thriller; Techno-thriller; Military fiction; Realistic fiction
- Publisher: G.P. Putnam's Sons
- Publication date: December 6, 2016
- Publication place: United States
- Media type: Print (Hardcover, Paperback), Audio, eBook
- Pages: 726
- ISBN: 9781101988831
- Preceded by: Commander in Chief
- Followed by: Power and Empire

True Faith and Allegiance (stylized as Tom Clancy True Faith and Allegiance, Tom Clancy: True Faith and Allegiance, or Tom Clancy's True Faith and Allegiance in the United Kingdom) is a political thriller, written by Mark Greaney and released on December 6, 2016. It is his fourth and final solo entry in the Ryanverse, featuring characters created by Tom Clancy.

In the book, President Jack Ryan and The Campus must contain a massive intelligence breach that has been responsible for a series of terrorist attacks on American military and intelligence personnel. The book debuted at number three on the New York Times bestseller list.

== Plot ==
Romanian hacker Alexandru Dalca obtains an old copy of the e-QIP database, which contains personal information on millions of U.S. military and intelligence personnel. The Chinese originally hire him to use the stolen information in order to locate U.S. spies in their country. However, Dalca uses this treasure trove of information to make a profit by building targeting packages on specific individuals. This attracts the attention of Saudi technocrat Sami bin Rashid, who wanted to provoke the United States into a quagmire in the Middle East fighting ISIS, which would then recoup the loss of profit in Saudi oil.

After making contact with Dalca through the dark web, Bin Rashid meets with ISIS operative Abu Musa al Matari and formulates a plan to attack U.S. military and intelligence personnel, using the targeting packages compiled by Dalca himself, in order to further his plan. Al Matari then recruits cleanskins and assigns them into cells to carry out the attacks. The video recordings of the assaults are then uploaded to the Islamic State's propaganda site, promoting the terror organization, garnering new followers, and inspiring a series of copycat attacks.

The intelligence community quickly becomes concerned about the wave of attacks on U.S. intelligence and military personnel, and scramble to find the source. President Jack Ryan is then pressured by the media and elements in his own government to deploy troops into the Middle East to battle the Islamic State, but persistently refuses to do so by gathering intelligence, knowing that Islamic State is provoking him.

Meanwhile The Campus, currently understaffed, recruits two new members: previously director of transportation Adara Sherman and ex-Delta Force operator Bartosz “Midas” Jankowski. They also investigate the attacks, and later deduce that the e-QIP database may have been compromised. Jack Ryan Jr. looks into a particular, seemingly unrelated attack on Scott Hagen, who is the commander of the guided missile destroyer USS James Greer, from the brother of a Russian submarine crew killed by Hagen in a recent battle in the Baltic Sea. (Note: As depicted in Commander in Chief) After looking into the assailant's social media, he finds out that Dalca provided information on Hagen prior to the attack. With this information on hand, The Campus heads to Romania.

In the meantime, the Chinese get suspicious about Dalca not following their orders. The hacker assumes the same thing, and when the Chinese come looking for him in his place of work, he escapes, intending to leave Romania. The Campus, who are surveilling the Romanian nearby, joins in the chase and get involved in a shootout with the Chinese, killing them, but Dalca is nowhere to be found. The Campus later finds out about Dalca's plans to leave the country, and abduct him at an airport. He decides to cooperate in stopping al Matari; Jack presents himself as a target, staying in an isolated cabin in a Maryland forest. Simultaneously, Olivia "Sally" Ryan accepts an engagement proposal from her Turkish boyfriend Dr. Davi Kartal. Al Matari takes the bait and is easily captured, while the rest of his henchmen are killed in the ensuing firefight, with Davi injuring the ringleader.

The headquarters of the Islamic State's propaganda wing was later destroyed in an airstrike. The U.S. betrays Dalca to Chinese security agents, but his fate is left unknown. Meanwhile, Bin Rashid was killed by The Campus in a plane headed for Australia.

== Characters ==
=== United States government ===
- Jack Ryan: President of the United States
- Scott Adler: Secretary of state
- Mary Pat Foley: Director of national intelligence
- Robert Burgess: Secretary of defense
- Jay Canfield: Director of the Central Intelligence Agency
- Dan Murray: Attorney general
- Andrew Zilko: Secretary of homeland security
- Arnold van Damm: President Ryan's chief of staff
- Stuart Collier: CIA operations officer
- Benjamin Kincaid: United States Department of State consular official
- Barbara Pineda: Analyst, Defense Intelligence Agency
- Jennifer Kincaid: CIA operations officer
- Thomas Russell: Assistant special agent in charge, director of Joint Terrorism Task Force
- David Jeffcoat: Supervisory special agent, Federal Bureau of Investigation

=== U.S. military ===
- Carrie Ann Davenport: Captain, United States Army; copilot/gunner of AH-64E Apache
- Troy Oakley: Chief warrant officer 3, United States Army; pilot of AH-64E Apache
- Scott Hagen: Commander, United States Navy; captain of USS James Greer (DDG-102)
- Wendell Caldwell: General, United States Army; commanding officer of United States Central Command

=== The Campus ===
- Gerry Hendley: Director of The Campus and Hendley Associates
- John Clark: Director of operations
- Domingo “Ding” Chavez: Senior operations officer
- Dominic “Dom” Caruso: Operations officer
- Jack Ryan, Jr.: Operations officer / senior analyst
- Gavin Biery: Director of information technology
- Adara Sherman: Director of transportation
- Bartosz Jankowski: Lieutenant colonel (Ret.), U.S. Army; call sign “Midas”; ex-Delta Force operator
- Helen Reid: Pilot of Campus Gulfstream G550
- Chester “Country” Hicks: Copilot of Campus Gulfstream G550

=== Other characters ===
- Dr. Cathy Ryan: First Lady of the United States
- Dr. Olivia “Sally” Ryan: Daughter of President Jack Ryan
- Dr. Davi Kartal: Turkish doctor and fiancé of Olivia Ryan
- Xozan Barzani: Kurdish Peshmerga commander
- Sami bin Rashid: Security official, Gulf Cooperation Council
- Abu Musa al-Matari: Yemeni national / Islamic State operative
- Vadim Rechkov: Russian citizen in U.S. on a student visa
- Dragomir Vasilescu: Director of Advanced Research Technological Designs (ARTD)
- Alexandru Dalca: Researcher for ARTD; open-source investigations expert
- Luca Gabor: Romanian prison inmate; identity intelligence expert
- Edward Laird: Former CIA executive; intelligence community contractor
- “Algiers”: Algerian ISIS operative
- Tripoli: Libyan ISIS operative
- Rakim: Leader of ISIS cell “Chicago”
- Omar: Leader of ISIS cell “Detroit”
- Angela Watson: Leader of ISIS cell “Atlanta”
- Kateb Albaf: Leader of ISIS cell “Santa Clara”
- David Hembrick: Leader of ISIS cell “Fairfax”

== Reception ==
=== Commercial ===
True Faith and Allegiance debuted at number three at the Combined Print & E-Book Fiction and Hardcover Fiction categories of the New York Times bestseller list for the week of December 25, 2016.

=== Critical ===
The book received generally positive reviews. Associated Press praised Greaney, who "handles the tech side with grace and has fleshed out the cast and given them depth." In a featured review, thriller novel reviewer The Real Book Spy praised the novel as "a fantastic, timely political thriller that has everything fans of the genre are looking for" and concluded that it is "A must-read for anyone who considers themselves a fan of thrillers."
