= Code of Honor (Cameron novel) =

2019 novel by Marc Cameron

- Author: Marc Cameron
- Audio read by: Scott Brick
- Language: English
- Series: Jack Ryan; The Campus
- Release number: 19
- Genre: Techno-thriller; Political thriller; Military fiction; Spy fiction; Realistic fiction
- Publisher: G.P. Putnam's Sons
- Publication date: November 19, 2019
- Publication place: United States
- Media type: Print (Hardcover), Audio, eBook
- Pages: 518
- ISBN: 9780525541721
- Preceded by: Oath of Office
- Followed by: Shadow of the Dragon

Code of Honor (stylized as Tom Clancy Code of Honor, Tom Clancy: Code of Honor, or Tom Clancy's Code of Honour in the United Kingdom) is a techno-thriller novel, written by Marc Cameron and published on November 19, 2019. It is his third book in the Jack Ryan series, which is part of the Ryanverse featuring characters created by Tom Clancy.

In the novel, President Ryan deals with the imprisonment of his friend and former CIA colleague, Jesuit priest Pat West, in Indonesia. Meanwhile, The Campus search for next-generation AI technology before the Chinese military can use it for nefarious purposes. The book debuted at number six on the New York Times bestseller list.

== Plot summary ==
In Indonesia, software engineer Geoff Noonan secretly sells the computer program Calliope to Suparman Games, an Indonesian gaming company. Soon after, he is lured into a honey trap by Wu Chao, an agent working for the cyber warfare division of the Chinese PLA. Along with his assassin Kang, Wu blackmails him into giving them a copy of Calliope, intending to exploit its next-generation AI capabilities to hack into American military computer systems.

The next day, Noonan turns to Jesuit priest Pat West for help; however, Wu and Kang catch up to them. They have the priest arrested by the Indonesian police for made-up charges of blasphemy against Islam. However, Father West, a former CIA officer, manages to send a private text message about his encounter with Noonan to his friend, U.S. President Jack Ryan.

Upon receiving the text message from Father West, President Ryan discreetly orders the Campus to investigate the priest’s text message. After pleading for the release of Father West to the Indonesian president to no avail, he decides to make a state visit to Indonesia. Meanwhile, the priest is speedily convicted of smuggling heroin and sentenced to death in the country’s Execution Island.

The Campus tracks down Noonan’s colleague Todd Ackerman, who is in hiding in New Zealand. However, they find him dead, murdered by PLA agents. After finding out about the sale, they proceed to Indonesia to break into the headquarters of Suparman Games and retrieve the purchased copy of Calliope. However, Suparman’s henchmen abduct Campus operative Domingo “Ding” Chavez.

In China, General Bai Min prepares FIRESHIP, a military operation that aims to utilize Calliope. The program is uploaded by a Chinese agent into an American communications company’s computer system. Afterwards, Wu and Kang attempt to assassinate Peter Li, an ex-Navy admiral working for the company, as well as his family. However, he fights back by killing Wu and a henchwoman, and flees with his pregnant wife Sophie and children. He later enlists his friend John Clark's help.

President Ryan receives intelligence on Chinese general Song Biming’s granddaughter, who is suffering from retinoblastoma and is about to be brought to the United States for a surgical operation. He reluctantly allows his wife Cathy Ryan to covertly make contact with the general, who is known to be at odds with General Bai. The operation is a success, and afterwards General Song discreetly passes information on FIRESHIP to Cathy.

In Indonesia, the Campus rescue Chavez from his captors and retrieve Calliope in the Suparman headquarters. However, they are separated when Suparman's henchmen chase them to an airfield. With Calliope in tow, Chavez and colleague Adara Sherman hijack an aircraft smuggling heroin, crashing into a nearby island. They eventually call for air support from USS Fort Worth, which eventually rescues them. Chavez then informs ship captain Jimmy Akana about Calliope.

Meanwhile, Senator Michelle Chadwick finds herself blackmailed by her lover, PLA operative David Huang, into spying on her political rival President Ryan. She eventually informs Ryan and joins him on his trip to Indonesia, where he tells the Indonesian president of China's plans. The latter releases Father West from prison, and General Bai and Huang are eventually arrested by their respective governments.

After embedding itself into several military communications systems, Calliope makes contact with an American F-35 stealth fighter in the middle of a training exercise in the Pacific Ocean. The application launches a cruise missile from the aircraft, steering it toward a waiting Chinese trawler. USS Makin Island, having been informed of Calliope's capabilities by Akana, quickly detects the application and deletes it from its computer system. Navy SEALs then retake the trawler with the stolen missile.

In Chicago, Clark lures Kang and his team to an ambush. However, a wounded Kang escapes and boards a train for Los Angeles. Clark follows and tracks him down, killing him.

== Characters ==
=== United States government ===
- Jack Ryan: President of the United States
- Mary Pat Foley: director of national intelligence
- Arnold "Arnie" van Damm: President Ryan's chief of staff
- Scott Adler: secretary of state

=== The Campus ===
- Gerry Hendley: director of The Campus and Hendley Associates
- John Clark: director of operations
- Domingo "Ding" Chavez: assistant director of operations
- Jack Ryan, Jr.: operations officer / senior analyst
- Dominic "Dom" Caruso: operations officer
- Adara Sherman: operations officer
- Bartosz "Midas" Jankowski: operations officer
- Gavin Biery: director of information technology

=== Other characters ===
==== United States ====
- Dr. Caroline "Cathy" Ryan First Lady of the United States
- Dr. Dan Berryhill: former medical school classmate of Dr. Ryan
- Peter Li: retired admiral, United States Navy
- Sophie Li: Peter's wife
- Michelle Chadwick: United States senator

==== Indonesia ====
- Gunawan "Gugun" Gumelar: president of Indonesia
- Geoff Noonan: gaming software engineer
- Suparman: owner, Suparman Games

==== China ====
- Zhao Chengzhi: president of China
- David Huang: Chinese operative
- General Song Biming: PRC military officer
- General Bai Min: PRC military officer
- Major Chang: Bai's aide
- Wu Chao: PLA major / operative, Central Military Commission
- Kang: Chinese assassin
- Tsai Zhan: Communist Party minder

== Reception ==
=== Commercial ===
The book debuted at number six on the Combined Print and E-Book Fiction and Hardcover Fiction categories of the New York Times bestseller list for the week of December 7, 2019. It charted at number 14 at the Mass Market Books category of the same list on November 2020.

=== Critical ===
The book received positive reviews. Thriller novel reviewer The Real Book Spy praised it, saying: "Marc Cameron has outdone himself once again, delivering the kind of fast-paced, original, true-to-the-characters thriller that Clancy’s fans have long devoured." Publishers Weekly's verdict on the novel is that "The plot unreels smoothly as it always does with Cameron at the helm. Readers will look forward to the further adventures of Ryan father and son." In a mixed review, Kirkus Reviews pointed out that while "the story is fun, as the Clancy yarns always are...some backstories feel like filler necessary to reach 500 pages."
