= Shadow of the Dragon (Cameron novel) =

2020 novel by Marc Cameron

- Author: Marc Cameron
- Audio read by: Scott Brick
- Language: English
- Series: Jack Ryan; The Campus
- Release number: 20
- Genre: Techno-thriller; Political thriller; Military fiction; Spy fiction; Realistic fiction
- Publisher: G.P. Putnam's Sons
- Publication date: November 17, 2020
- Publication place: United States
- Media type: Print (Hardcover), Audio, eBook
- Pages: 512
- ISBN: 9780593188095
- Preceded by: Code of Honor
- Followed by: Chain of Command

Shadow of the Dragon (stylized as Tom Clancy Shadow of the Dragon, Tom Clancy: Shadow of the Dragon, or Tom Clancy's Shadow of the Dragon in the United Kingdom) is a techno-thriller novel, written by Marc Cameron and published on November 17, 2020. It is his fourth book in the Jack Ryan series, which is part of the Ryanverse featuring characters created by Tom Clancy.

In the novel, President Ryan deals with a mole in the CIA as The Campus tracks down a missing Chinese scientist and his Uyghur assistant. The book debuted at number seven on the New York Times bestseller list.

== Plot summary ==
Along the Arctic Ocean, scientist Dr. Patti Moon hears mysterious man made sounds under the ice while on board the icebreaking research vessel Sikuliaq. The sounds are from the Chinese nuclear ballistic missile submarine Long March #880, which had suffered an engine fire that burned most of its crew. Long March sends out a coded distress signal, which is picked up by the Chinese and American navies.

Meanwhile, Professor Liu Wangshu, one of the top engineering scientists at Ministry of State Security, has disappeared. MSS operatives looking for the professor in Huludao get into a gunfight with Russian operatives, incorrectly thinking that he had defected to them. The Chinese Navy subsequently takes over the hunt, tasking the assassin Fu Bohai with looking for Medina Tohti, Professor Liu's Uyghur assistant who had helped him design an experimental silent propulsion drive called Mirage. Medina has since become part of a separatist group called the Wuming (Nameless) that had been responsible for a series of targeted assassinations in western China. The Chinese Navy also monitors her daughter Hala, who lives with her aunt Zulfira in Kashgar, hoping to lure Medina.

CIA non-official cover officer Adam Yao relays this information to Director of National Intelligence Mary Pat Foley, also adding that the Chinese Navy has a mole in the CIA codenamed SURVEYOR. President Jack Ryan tasks Director Foley with tracking down the mole and discreetly assigns The Campus with finding Medina and her daughter. Director Foley recruits retiring operations officer Monica Hendricks to lead the hunt for SURVEYOR, named ELISE. Hendricks recruits her friend, retired Admiral Peter Li, (Note: Li previously appeared in Code of Honor) to assist her.

Professor Liu is revealed to be testing Mirage aboard the Long March, which was subsequently destroyed in the fire. With the professor now unconscious, Long March’s executive officer Wan Xiuying volunteers to be sent to the surface through an escape trunk in order to seek help. He is later rescued by the United States Coast Guard icebreaker Healy as the Chinese attack submarine Expedition #771 searches for Long March nearby.

Campus operatives John Clark and Bartosz “Midas” Jankowski separately enter Kashgar. Clark rescues Hala from being killed by the Bingtuan bureaucrat Ren Zhelan, who had killed her aunt after protecting her niece from his boss Mr. Suo, who attempted to rape her. Clark and Hala then evade capture by Zhelan's brother Major Ren Shuren, who briefly arrests Midas but lets him go. They are later rescued by U.S. Special Forces at the Wakhjir Pass along the Afghanistan border.

Meanwhile, Yao instructs case officer Leigh Murphy to interview a Uyghur refugee in Albania to find out about the Wuming's hideout, which is in Lake Kanas. Murphy's superior Fredrick Rask complains about her actions to fellow case officer Tim Meyer, who is revealed to be the mole SURVEYOR. The Chinese Navy informs Fu, who captures and kills Murphy and then goes to Lake Kanas in pursuit of Medina.

Yao joins Campus operatives Domingo "Ding" Chavez, Jack Ryan, Jr., Adara Sherman, and Lisanne Robertson as they enter China and go to Lake Kanas. They find Medina and convince her to join them by informing her of her daughter's rescue. They fend off an attempt by Fu to intercept them across the lake, while Lisanne is injured in a separate gunfight with Fu's henchmen and later loses an arm. They later escape to Mongolia through a Light Observation Helicopter.

President Ryan calls the Chinese president to inform him about the Long March. He implores him to stop the Chinese submarine Expedition from harassing the icebreaker Healy and allows him to rescue Long March‘s crew while promising to return its recovering executive officer at a later date. Meanwhile, Medina provides information about the Mirage drive to Hendricks, who lets Meyer take the plans to his Chinese handler. Yao later kills Fu in revenge for Murphy's death. Meyer subsequently escapes to Fiji, where Clark kills him by injecting succinylcholine.

Later, Jack introduces Lisanne to his parents.

== Characters ==
=== United States government ===
- Jack Ryan: President of the United States
- Arnold "Arnie" van Damm: President Ryan's chief of staff
- Mary Pat Foley: director of national intelligence
- Scott Adler: secretary of state
- Robert Burgess: secretary of defense
- Admiral John Talbot: chief of naval operations
- Gary Montgomery: special agent, Secret Service Presidential Protection Detail
- Jay Canfield: director of the Central Intelligence Agency
- Robbie Forestall: commander of the United States Navy, adviser to President Ryan

=== The Campus ===
- Gerry Hendley: director of The Campus and Hendley Associates
- John Clark: director of operations
- Domingo "Ding" Chavez: assistant director of operations
- Jack Ryan, Jr.: operations officer, senior analyst
- Dominic "Dom" Caruso: operations officer
- Adara Sherman: operations officer
- Bartosz "Midas" Jankowski: operations officer
- Gavin Biery: director of information technology
- Lisanne Robertson: director of transportation

=== Other characters ===
- Dr. Caroline "Cathy" Ryan: First Lady of the United States
- Adam Yao: CIA case officer (NOC)
- Dr. Patti Moon: Scientist on light icebreaker R/V Sikuliaq
- Kelli Symonds: First officer, R/V Sikuliaq
- Chief Petty Officer Shad Barker: Sonar technician, USS John Paul Jones

==== China ====
- Liu Wangshu: Engineering professor
- Medina Tohti: Uyghur woman, fugitive from PRC authorities
- Hala Tohti: Medina's daughter
- Zulfira Azizi: Medina's sister; Hala's aunt
- Timur Samedi: Kashgar contact
- Yunus Samedi: Kashgar contact
- Ren Shuren: Major, Xinjiang Production and Construction Corps
- Ren Zhelan: Chinese assistant bureaucrat, Kashgar Medina
- Mr. Suo: Chinese bureaucrat, Kashgar
- Ma "Mamut" Jianyu: Leader of the Wuming movement; Uyghur mother, Han father
- Zheng Guiying: People's Liberation Army Navy (PLAN) admiral in charge of naval intelligence
- Fu Bohai: Zheng's henchman and primary hunter of Medina
- Qiu: Fu Bohai's assistant

==== PLAN Yuan-class attack submarine Expedition #771 (Blue Dragon) ====
- Sun Luoyang: Captain
- Bai Jiahao: Commander, XO (Executive Officer)

==== PLAN Nuclear SSBN 880 (Long March) ====
- Tian Ju: Captain
- Wan Xiuying: Commander, XO (Executive Officer)

==== USS Indiana (SSN-789) Virginia-class fast attack submarine ====
- Cole Condiff: Captain
- Lowdermilk: Lieutenant, officer of the deck
- Markette: Petty officer, sonar technician
- Ramirez: New crew member
- Roosevelt "Rosey" Jackson: Captain, USS Makin Island; nephew of former POTUS Robert Jackson
- Jay Rapoza: Captain, USCG icebreaker Healy

==== ELISE ====
- Monica Hendricks: CIA operations officer in charge of ELISE
- Peter Li: Retired USN admiral
- David Wallace: FBI counterintelligence agent assigned to ELISE
- Odette Miller: CIA counterintelligence officer
- Tim Meyer: CIA case officer

==== Albania ====
- Leigh Murphy: CIA case officer, Tirana
- Fredrick Rask: CIA chief of station, Tirana
- Vlora Cafaro: CIA case officer, Tirana
- Joey Shoop: CIA officer, Tirana
- Urkesh Beg: Uyghur refugee living in asylum in Albania

== Reception ==
=== Commercial ===
The book debuted at number seven on the Combined Print and E-Book Fiction category of the New York Times bestseller list for the week of December 6, 2020, as well as number nine on the Hardcover Fiction category of the same list. It charted at number two on the Mass Market Books category of the same list in December 2021.

=== Critical ===
The book received positive reviews. Publishers Weekly regarded it as "classic Clancy—only new and improved", while Kirkus Reviews praised Cameron as "a worthy keeper of the Clancy flame".
