= Marc Cameron =

American novelist

- Born: 1961 (age 64–65); Texas, U.S.
- Education: Weatherford High School
- Occupation: Writer
- Writing career
- Years active: 2011–present
- Genres: Thriller; Techno-thriller; Military fiction; Spy fiction; Crime fiction; Realistic fiction
- Notable works: Tom Clancy: Power and Empire; National Security; Open Carry
- Website: marccameronbooks.com

Marc Cameron (born 1961) is an American novelist. He is known for the Jack Ryan novels, which are part of the Ryanverse featuring characters created by Tom Clancy, as well as the Jericho Quinn and Arliss Cutter series of action adventure novels.

== Early life ==
Cameron was born and raised in Texas, and graduated from Weatherford High School in 1980. He later spent 29 years in law enforcement as a police officer. In early 1991 he became part of the United States Marshals Service, specializing in dignitary protection, and moved through the ranks until finally retiring as chief of the district of Alaska in 2011 in order to pursue writing full-time.

Cameron has a second-degree black belt in jujutsu, and often teaches defensive tactics to law enforcement agencies and civilian groups. He is also a certified scuba diver, man-tracker and an avid adventure motorcyclist; his novels would later prominently feature motorcycles.

== Writing career ==
Cameron loved to watch Indiana Jones and James Bond movies as a child, which aroused his interest in becoming a writer. He published his first novel, National Security (2011), which became critically acclaimed; bestselling thriller writer Brad Thor hailed it as "awesome" and praised Cameron as “one of the hottest new authors in the thriller genre”. Its success spawned seven more novels and a novella.

Cameron’s short stories have appeared in The Saturday Evening Post and Boys' Life magazine. He has also written a Western novel, To Hell and Beyond (2017), under the pseudonym Mark Henry.

Cameron has started a new thriller series featuring U.S. Marshal Arliss Cutter; its first entry, Open Carry, was released in February 2019.

=== Tom Clancy universe ===
Cameron became a fan of Tom Clancy from reading The Hunt for Red October as a rookie policeman. Later, his friend and writer of the Jack Ryan series Mark Greaney suggested him to his editor Tom Colgan when he was planning to step away from the franchise. Greaney later said of the recommendation: "His writing is both intelligent and action-packed, and Marc has an impressive personal resume that I am sure he will work into the novels to great effect.”

The Real Book Spy announced Greaney's departure from the franchise on February 20, 2017, and introduced Cameron to replace him as writer of the Jack Ryan novels slated for winter release. Speaking about his inclusion into the series, he says: “I especially enjoy writing Jack Ryan. He’s such a good, honest archetype of a character. The cool thing about Jack is that he’s so strong and so vulnerable at the same time. I wanted to be sure I got him exactly right, so I wrote a lot of drafts of the chapters with him.” Regarding the negative reaction upon authors continuing the Tom Clancy universe after his death, Cameron asserts: “Some people are, like, ruined-their-life angry. I’m a lighten-up kind of guy. If you don’t want to read them, don’t. But there are so many stories in these characters, and we have an obligation to keep them going, authentically, like the original author wanted them to be.”

Cameron's first entry in the series, Tom Clancy: Power and Empire, was published in November 2017 and debuted at number six on the New York Times bestseller list. Publishers Weekly praised the novel: "All the writers who have contributed to this series since Clancy’s death have been good, but Cameron’s formidable performance puts him at the head of the pack." Cameron continued the series with six more books. In 2024, he exited the series and was succeeded by Brian Andrews and Jeffrey Wilson.

== Bibliography ==
=== Jericho Quinn series ===
- National Security (2011)
- Act of Terror (2012)
- State of Emergency (2013)
- Time of Attack (2014)
- Day Zero (2015)
- Brute Force (2016)
- Field of Fire (January 2017)
- Dead Drop (July 2017)
- The Triple Frontier (novella) (2018)
- Active Measures (2019)

=== Jack Ryan series ===
Featuring characters created by Tom Clancy

- Tom Clancy: Power and Empire (2017)
- Tom Clancy: Oath of Office (2018)
- Tom Clancy: Code of Honor (2019)
- Tom Clancy: Shadow of the Dragon (2020)
- Tom Clancy: Chain of Command (2021)
- Tom Clancy: Red Winter (2022)
- Tom Clancy: Command and Control (2023)

=== Arliss Cutter series ===
- Open Carry (2019)
- Stone Cross (2020)
- Bone Rattle (2021)
- Cold Snap (2022)
- Breakneck (2023)
- Bad River (2024)
- Dead Line (2025)
- Back Track (2026)

=== As Mark Henry ===
- Hard Road to Heaven (2005)
- To Hell and Beyond (2006)
