= Patriot Games =

1987 novel by Tom Clancy

- First edition cover
- Author: Tom Clancy
- Language: English
- Series: Jack Ryan
- Release number: 2
- Genre: Thriller; Crime fiction
- Publisher: G. P. Putnam's Sons
- Publication date: July 2, 1987
- Publication place: United States
- Media type: Print (hardcover and paperback)
- Pages: 540
- ISBN: 0399132414
- Preceded by: The Hunt for Red October
- Followed by: The Cardinal of the Kremlin

Patriot Games is a thriller novel, written by Tom Clancy and published on July 2, 1987. A prequel to The Hunt for Red October (1984), it is chronologically the first book featuring Jack Ryan, the main character in Clancy's Ryanverse. The novel focuses on Ryan being the target of an Irish terrorist group after he foils their kidnapping attempt on the Prince and Princess of Wales in London. It debuted at number one on The New York Times Best Seller list. A film adaptation, starring Harrison Ford as Ryan, premiered on June 5, 1992.

== Plot summary ==
An attempt to kidnap the Prince and Princess of Wales and their infant son (Note: Considering the time frame of the novel, this would refer to Prince Charles and Princess Diana, their infant son being the later Prince William.) occurs on the Mall in London. The attack is orchestrated by the Ulster Liberation Army (ULA), a splinter group of the Provisional Irish Republican Army (PIRA). However, history professor and former U.S. Marine Jack Ryan intervenes, incapacitating one attacker, Sean Miller. During the gun battle, Ryan is wounded by Miller's companion John Michael McCrory as they exchange gunfire. McCrory is killed and Miller is arrested.

While recovering, Ryan is honored by the British government and is granted the honorary Knight Commander of the Royal Victorian Order by Queen Elizabeth II. Later, Miller is sentenced to life imprisonment for the kidnapping attempt. His ULA compatriots, led by Kevin O'Donnell, free him while he is being transported to a maximum security prison on the Isle of Wight. They escape to their secret camp in the North African desert.

Ryan resumes his career as a naval history professor at the United States Naval Academy in Annapolis, Maryland, confident that the Irish have neither the means nor will to carry out an attack on American soil. Still, with his wife Cathy now carrying their second child, he takes up firearms training as a precaution. Meanwhile, Miller persuades O'Donnell to launch an operation in the U.S. aimed at targeting Ryan and his family, with assistance from African-American domestic terrorist Alexander Dobbens. Though primarily for revenge, the operation is also designed to reduce American support for the rival PIRA, which is to be blamed for the upcoming attack.

The assassin sent to kill Ryan at the Naval Academy is intercepted before he completes his task; however, Cathy and their daughter Sally are seriously injured when Miller shoots at them and causes their car to crash on a freeway. Two nearby officers witness the scene, one stays behind to render aid. At the same time, the other one pursues the attackers and is killed when Miller fires at his police vehicle from the back of the van. A police helicopter that was also pursuing the vehicle trails the terrorists to a shopping mall, where the terrorists are lost. Cathy and Sally are airlifted by helicopter to a nearby hospital in Annapolis for treatment. Both recover, although the latter required her spleen to be removed and spent more time in the Intensive care unit since her seatbelt was not fastened.

After the attack, Ryan accepts an offer by Central Intelligence Agency (CIA)'s Deputy Director of Intelligence James Greer to work there as an analyst. He helps them analyze satellite imagery of ULA’s suspected camp, leading to a raid on an Action Directe camp by French intelligence (DGSE). Later, the Prince and Princess of Wales schedule a trip to the United States, which includes a stop at Ryan's home in Maryland. This provides another opportunity for Miller, who plans a sneak attack to kidnap the Prince and Princess of Wales as well as Ryan's family.

Dobbens, who works for the local electric company, arranges for a transformer near Ryan's house to break down. He uses his work order to fix the transformer to get a van, ladders, and a small team of terrorists past the Prince and Princess's security; a much larger team arrives by boat and uses the ladders to summit the seaside cliffs behind Ryan's house. The attackers kill several guards, but Jack, his family, the Prince and Princess, and the Ryans' friends Lieutenant Commander Robert Jefferson "Robby" Jackson and his wife Sissy, escape via speed boat to the Chesapeake Bay. After getting the women to safety at the Naval Academy, Jack, Robby, and the Prince enlist the help of Academy sailors and United States Marines as Miller, O’Donnell, and the rest of the ULA terrorists escape into a waiting Cyprus-flagged container ship seized by the United States Coast Guard. Ryan corners Miller in the ship and tries to kill him, but is restrained by his Marine firearms trainer, who warns Ryan, "He's not worth it.". After the terrorists are apprehended, Ryan arrives in Annapolis just in time for the birth of his son, Jack Ryan, Jr.. The Jacksons and the Prince and Princess will be his godparents.

== Characters ==
- Jack Ryan: History teacher at the United States Naval Academy in Annapolis, Maryland; later an analyst for the Central Intelligence Agency.
- Dr. Caroline "Cathy" Ryan: Ophthalmic surgeon at the Wilmer Eye Institute, which is part of the Johns Hopkins University School of Medicine; Jack Ryan's wife.
- Olivia "Sally" Ryan: Jack and Cathy Ryan's daughter.
- Prince of Wales
- Princess of Wales
- Special Agent Daniel E. "Dan" Murray: Legal attaché for the FBI at the United States Embassy in London.
- James "Jimmy" Owens: English police officer specializing in anti-terrorism operations.
- David Ashley: MI5 officer working with Owens to track down the ULA and its members.
- Robby Jackson: Fighter pilot and instructor at the U.S. Naval Academy in Annapolis, Maryland; Jack Ryan's friend.
- Sean Miller: Operations officer for the Ulster Liberation Army (ULA).
- Kevin Joseph O'Donnell: Leader of the ULA.
- James Greer: CIA Deputy Director of Intelligence. Personally recruits Ryan into the agency.
- Marty Cantor: Admiral Greer's assistant, later replaced by Ryan.
- Sergeant Major Noah Breckenridge: Security section chief and head firearms instructor at the U.S. Naval Academy in Annapolis.
- Padraig "Paddy" O'Neil: Representative for the Provisional Irish Republican Army in the British Parliament.
- Dennis Cooley: Rare bookshop owner; agent for the ULA. After being compromised by British law enforcement, he volunteers for the ULA’s attack on the Ryan residence, but is shot dead by his own compatriot.
- Geoffrey Watkins: Liaison between the British Foreign Office and the Royal Family; revealed to be the ULA mole that secretly passed information to O'Donnell through Cooley. Commits suicide after Miller, O'Donnell, and other ULA terrorists get arrested.
- Alexander Dobbens: Member of an African-American domestic terrorist group referred to as "the Movement"; assisted the ULA in their operations in the United States. Killed by Miller after learning that Ryan escaped from his residence during their attack.

== Themes ==
Patriot Games was notable for subverting the moral ambiguity of the antagonists in espionage novels by John le Carré, Len Deighton, and Robert Ludlum. According to Marc Cerasini's essay on the novel, "Clancy's sensible revulsion toward the terrorists is so strident and intense...that it verges on the physical." He added that "the author's understandable disgust toward his villains is 'bourgeois', for there is not a shred of sympathy for these Irish 'patriots'."

The novel is also said to be inspired by the gothic horror genre in the depiction of the ULA as "twisted political misfits" who practice political violence in the vein of Count Dracula and his "family", as well as other gothic elements like the presence of the Prince and Princess of Wales.

== Development ==
Clancy started working on the storyline for Patriot Games in 1979, alongside other novels featuring Jack Ryan which would later be published: The Hunt for Red October (1984) and The Cardinal of the Kremlin (1988). He says of his passion for accuracy and detail: "When I was in London, researching Patriot Games, I spent 20 hours walking around the Mall with a camera, clipboard and tape recorder, just choreographing my opening chapter, to make sure it would happen exactly the way I wrote it. Later, when I took my kids there, I could tell them, 'This is the tree that Jack Ryan hid his wife and daughter behind, and that's the road where the bad guys escaped.' I feel a moral obligation to my readers to get it right. In the insurance business, you have to pay attention to details or a client could lose everything. A doctor has to, a cop, a fireman, why not a writer?" Although he was criticized for toning down the novel's technical details in comparison to The Hunt for Red October, Clancy considers Patriot Games to be his best.

Discussing the final scene where Jack Ryan lets the primary antagonist Sean Miller live instead of killing him, Clancy remarked: "Of all the letters I got on Patriot Games, not one said, 'He should have killed the little bastard.' Personally I'd have done it. You harm my kids and I'll blow you away. You don't touch my kids. But I'm not Jack Ryan. He has to be in control. He plays by the rules."

== Reception ==
Commercially, Patriot Games debuted at number one on The New York Times Best Seller list for the week of August 2, 1987. By 1988, it had sold over 1,063,000 hardcover copies.

The book received generally positive reviews. The New York Times praised it as "a powerful piece of popular fiction; its plot, if implausible, is irresistible, and its emotions are universal." However, Kirkus Reviews's verdict is mixed, stating that "Exciting shoot-outs and chases, and lots of Royal wish-fulfillment; but without naval authenticity to bolster the prose, Clancy is a fish out of water."

== Film adaptation ==
The novel was adapted as a feature film, which was released on June 5, 1992. Jack Ryan was played by Harrison Ford and Sean Miller was played by Sean Bean. The film is notable for being the sequel to the previous movie The Hunt for Red October (1990), although the order is the opposite in the books. Additionally, the Prince and Princess of Wales were replaced by Lord Holmes, Secretary of State for Northern Ireland and the Queen's cousin, as the ULA's primary target. Patriot Games spent two weeks as the No. 1 film, eventually grossing $178,051,587 in worldwide box office business. It has garnered generally positive reviews, and earned a 73% "Fresh" rating on Rotten Tomatoes based on 33 reviews.

Conversely, the movie was criticized by Clancy for deviating too much from the source material, stating that "I don't like eating dirt, and I won't eat any from these guys." "There is only one, maybe two, scenes in the shooting script that correspond to a scene in the book," Clancy later added. "They have a movie called Patriot Games that uses my characters—but it's not my story." He eventually asked for his name to be removed from the film's promotional materials, but then entered negotiations with the same team at Paramount Pictures to sell them the rights to his other novel The Sum of All Fears (1991). By the time the film was released in 2002, the author had cooled off on the idea of having his books made into films. Ironically, though, Clancy was Executive producer on The Sum Of All Fears.
