= Commander in Chief (novel) =

2015 novel by Mark Greaney

- Author: Mark Greaney
- Audio read by: Scott Brick
- Language: English
- Series: Jack Ryan; The Campus
- Release number: 15
- Genre: Political thriller; Techno-thriller; Military fiction; Realistic fiction
- Publisher: G.P. Putnam's Sons
- Publication date: December 1, 2015
- Publication place: United States
- Media type: Print (Hardcover, Paperback), Audio, eBook
- Pages: 788
- ISBN: 9781101988817
- Preceded by: Full Force and Effect
- Followed by: True Faith and Allegiance

Commander in Chief (stylized as Tom Clancy Commander in Chief, Tom Clancy: Commander in Chief, or Tom Clancy’s Commander-in-Chief in the United Kingdom) is a political thriller novel, written by Mark Greaney and released on December 1, 2015. It is Greaney’s third solo entry in the Ryanverse, featuring characters created by Tom Clancy.

In the novel, President Jack Ryan and The Campus must stop Russian president Valeri Volodin from launching a covert violent offensive in an effort to bring back Russia as a superpower. The book debuted at number two on the New York Times bestseller list.

== Plot ==
In Russia, the silovik, a group of military & intelligence officers and businessmen who basically control the country’s affairs, are concerned about the country’s economic decline. President Valeri Volodin brings up a plan of covert armed conflict within Europe that will ensure the restoration of Russia’s status as a superpower, while at the same time revamping its economy and benefiting the siloviki as a result. Privately however, Volodin tasks a financial expert, Andrei Limonov, with securing his assets worldwide in case his plan does not work.

Weeks later, a string of attacks plague most of Eastern Europe. A Lithuanian LNG tanker, the Independence, gets attacked by an eco-terrorist group. A Russian military train transporting men and materiel to Kaliningrad Oblast gets attacked by a Polish terrorist group, which gives Volodin an excuse to increase military presence in the region. Russian submarines begin attacking the Lithuanian Navy, and had torpedoed another oil tanker bound for Estonia. U.S. President Jack Ryan immediately notices a pattern in the recent attacks and the corresponding increase in Russia’s oil profit. He tries to recruit the North Atlantic Treaty Organization (NATO)’s help, but they decline, fearing the consequences of an all-out war. Frustrated, he later deploys the U.S. Navy to dispatch its Russian counterpart.

Meanwhile, Jack Ryan, Jr. is in Rome, Italy, investigating Russia’s money networks as well as spending time with his Iranian girlfriend Ysabel Kashani. He finds out about Limonov and moves to Luxembourg to follow up on his investigation, despite being followed by a paparazzo named Salvatore. Unbeknownst to him, the paparazzo had implanted a tracking device on Kashani's belongings, and the Iranian is later attacked by a group of men led by Russian hitman Yegor Morozov; they are dispatched by Jack in the resulting altercation. Ysabel is later hospitalized.

Domingo “Ding” Chavez and Dominic “Dom” Caruso are tasked by Director of National Intelligence Mary Pat Foley to photograph specific locations along the Belarusian border. While there, they are asked to escort Pete Branyon, a local CIA station chief in Lithuania, to a meeting with some of his assets. During the meeting, Branyon gets kidnapped; Chavez and Caruso give chase and later rescue him. With help from Lithuanian intelligence director Linus Sabonis, they find out the identity of Branyon’s kidnappers as Serbs who posed as the Polish group that attacked the Russian train in Kaliningrad Oblast.

Distraught about what happened to his girlfriend, Jack returns to the US and goes on his investigation into Limonov; he finds out that he is in the British Virgin Islands to meet with Terry Walker, inventor of the world’s largest Bitcoin exchange, to propose moving eight billion dollars for his client (implied to be Volodin) in and out of Bitcoin with a large commission. Campus operative John Clark is tasked with turning Walker, but finds out that Walker has been coerced into working with the Russians by kidnapping his wife and son, because he had turned down Limonov’s deal due to concern that the deal would draw too much attention to himself. Clark tries to save Walker’s family, but is ambushed by a group of men working for Kozlov, Limonov’s personal bodyguard. Clark was later rescued by Adara Sherman. Together, they rescue Walker and his family and capture Limonov, who later reveals Volodin’s frantic plan to move his assets.

Against orders, Jack tracks down Salvatore to Brussels, Belgium (at the Stanhope hotel by Thon Hotels). Chavez and Caruso are redirected there to assist him. They find out that Salvatore is part of an eco-terrorist group that are preparing to attack a nearby oil and gas conference. They later dispatch the attackers, and find out that they are also responsible for the attack on the Independence. Meanwhile, a naval battle in the Baltic Sea results in victory for the U.S. and Polish navies over the Russian submarines, and the Russian advance into Lithuania is averted by the Swedish Air Force, who aid U.S. marines that are being pushed back by the Russian forces.

His diabolical plan in shambles, Volodin is later assassinated by the silovik. Jack gets suspended from The Campus for not reporting Salvatore sooner and for not following orders.

== Characters ==
=== United States government ===
- Jack Ryan: President of the United States
- Scott Adler: Secretary of state
- Mary Pat Foley: Director of national intelligence
- Robert "Bob" Burgess: Secretary of defense
- Jay Canfield: Director of the Central Intelligence Agency
- Dan Murray: Attorney general
- Arnold van Damm: President Ryan's chief of staff
- Peter Branyon: CIA chief of station, Vilnius, Lithuania
- Greg Donlin: CIA security officer

=== United States military ===
- Roland Hazelton: Admiral, chief of naval operations, United States Navy
- Scott Hagen: Commander, captain of the USS James Greer (DDG-102), United States Navy
- Phil Kincaid: Lieutenant commander, executive officer of USS James Greer (DDG-102), United States Navy
- Damon Hart: Lieutenant, weapons officer on USS James Greer (DDG-102), United States Navy
- Richard "Rich" Belanger: Lieutenant colonel, 3rd Battalion, 5th Marine Regiment, 1st Marine Division, United States Marine Corps; battalion commander of the Black Sea Rotational Force

=== The Campus ===
- Gerry Hendley: Director, The Campus/Hendley Associates
- John Clark: Director of operations
- Domingo "Ding" Chavez: Senior operations officer
- Dominic "Dom" Caruso: Operations officer
- Jack Ryan, Jr.: Operations officer/analyst
- Gavin Biery: Director of information technology
- Adara Sherman: Director of transportation

=== The Russians ===
- Valeri Volodin: President of the Russian Federation
- Mikhail "Misha" Grankin: Director of the Kremlin Security Council (Russian intelligence)
- Arkady Diburov: Chairman of the board of directors of Gazprom, Russian natural gas company
- Andrei Limonov (Mr. Ivanov): Russian private equity manager
- Vlad Kozlov (Mr. Popov): Intelligence operative in the kremlin Security Council
- Yegor Morozov: Intelligence operative in the Kremlin Security council
- Tatiana Molchanova: Television newscaster, Novorissiya (Channel Seven)

=== Other characters ===
- Martina Jaeger: Dutch contract killer
- Braam Jaeger: Dutch contract killer
- Terry Walker: President and CEO of BlackHole Bitcoin Exchange, cryptocurrency trader
- Kate Walker: Wife of Terry Walker
- Noah Walker: Son of Terry Walker
- Eglé Banyté: President of Lithuania
- Marion Schöngarth: Chancellor of the Federal Republic of Germany
- Salvatore: Italian paparazzo
- Christine von Langer: Former CIA case officer
- Herkus Zarkus: Lithuanian fiber-optic network technician; Land Force soldier
- Linus Sabonis: Director, Lithuanian State Security Department

== Development ==
In researching for the novel, Greaney spent a day in the Arleigh Burke-class destroyer USS Sampson and talked with naval officers specializing in anti-submarine warfare; the destroyer's designated number would later be used in the novel, this time for USS James Greer. In addition, the naval battle in the Baltic Sea, which is depicted in Commander in Chief, paid homage to Tom Clancy's debut novel The Hunt for Red October; Greaney said about the experience: "Tom did it so well; it just didn’t need to be redone, especially by a follow-on author, but the advances in submarines and anti-submarine warfare over the past few years just made it really interesting. I framed it as, 'OK, you’re not going down into the submarine like Tom did. This is anti-submarine warfare, and they are the sharks in the water. The Americans have to go find them.'"

== Reception ==
=== Commercial ===
The novel debuted at number two on both the Combined Print & E-Book Fiction and Hardcover Fiction categories of the New York Times bestseller list for the week of December 20, 2015.

=== Critical ===
Commander in Chief enjoyed generally positive reviews. Publishers Weekly praised Greaney, who "manages it without being boring", which "shows that he's well qualified to continue the adventures of Jack Ryan and son"; they concluded that "In the best tradition of Clancy, Greaney capably lays out the groundwork for these machinations before setting them all in entertaining motion. Fans of military action thrillers will be well satisfied." Thriller novel reviewer The Real Book Spy lauded the book, saying that "The hallmark of a good thriller is that it’s exciting and fast. Greaney seems to embrace that style, and it works really well here."
