= Power and Empire =

2017 novel by Marc Cameron

- Author: Marc Cameron
- Audio read by: Scott Brick
- Language: English
- Series: Jack Ryan; The Campus
- Release number: 17
- Genre: Political thriller; Techno-thriller; Crime fiction; Realistic fiction
- Publisher: G.P. Putnam's Sons
- Publication date: November 28, 2017
- Publication place: United States
- Media type: Print (Hardcover, Paperback), Audio, eBook
- Pages: 582
- ISBN: 9780735215894
- Preceded by: True Faith and Allegiance
- Followed by: Oath of Office

Power and Empire (stylized as Tom Clancy Power and Empire, Tom Clancy: Power and Empire or Tom Clancy's Power and Empire in the United Kingdom) is a political thriller novel, written by Marc Cameron and released on November 28, 2017. It is his first book in the Jack Ryan series, which is part of the Ryanverse featuring characters created by Tom Clancy.

In the novel, President Ryan and The Campus must prevent a secret cabal heightening the tensions between the United States and China from causing a violent coup in the Chinese government. The book debuted at number six on the New York Times bestseller list.

== Plot summary ==
Zhao Chengzhi was appointed as President of China after the death of his predecessor Wei Zhen Lin years prior. (Note: As depicted in Threat Vector) However, his moderate stance on national and international affairs angers hardliners in the Chinese government, particularly Foreign Minister Li Zhengsheng, who perceives him to be a weakling. He creates a secret cabal of like-minded government officials who plot to escalate tensions with the United States, which would lead U.S. President Jack Ryan to invoke the Ryan Doctrine and order Zhao to be killed on account of his supposed recklessness, therefore paving the way for Li's ascension to power.

Putting his plot into motion, Li recruits General Xu Jinlong, the head of the Central Security Bureau, to sabotage a Chinese commercial ship, which later explodes near American waters; the nearby United States Coast Guard on the northern West Coast manages to rescue most of its crew after it sank, but ten men are either dead or missing. The incident was meant to be the first step toward provoking the United States, but President Ryan urges caution.

In addition, Li enlists agent provocateur Vincent Chen, codenamed Coronet, to orchestrate a series of attacks led by terrorist groups: on an oil drilling operation in Chad (American soldiers, who were on a military exercise nearby, assist and are killed by Boko Haram) and a private sailboat near Indonesia (by allowing its occupants to call for help, Jemaah Islamiyah pirates aim to lure a nearby American patrol ship so that they can in turn attack it). President Ryan discovers the Chinese connection to the incidents, but is still cautious.

Meanwhile, Taiwanese journalist Eddie Feng, who has first-hand access to the Chinese government, discovers Coronet's responsibility behind a subway bombing in China that he was investigating and his connection to a sex trafficking ring in Texas. This attracts The Campus's attention, which then surveils Feng through several nightclubs in Dallas. A young prostitute named Magdalena Rojas later steals Feng's flash drive containing classified information, which she believes will free her; however, she gives it to her fellow prostitute Blanca for safekeeping when she was sold to a buyer. Blanca and her owner later get pulled over by a state trooper, who then rescues the young girl from the trafficker in the resulting altercation.

Following up on Blanca and Feng's flash drive, a team of FBI investigators led by Kelsey Callahan who specialize in child trafficking cases arrest Feng in a nightclub. Campus operative Dominic “Dom” Caruso uses his FBI credentials to join the investigation and to retrieve the flash drive. The Campus find out information about Chen's next whereabouts, which is at an agriculture conference in Buenos Aires, Argentina; Li will be in attendance. Caruso as well as John Clark remain in Texas to investigate Chen's connection to the sex trafficking ring, while Domingo “Ding” Chavez, Jack Ryan Jr., Bartosz “Midas” Jankowski, and Adara Sherman head to Buenos Aires to surveil Chen.

Li secretly uses the conference as an opportunity to stage through Chen and his henchmen an assassination attempt on himself, which he believes will make him more popular back in China. They detonate a bomb at the conference's venue, killing and injuring some of the attendees and bystanders. The Campus witness the incident and later meet up with Monzaki Yukiko, a Japanese intelligence officer who was also there to surveil Chen in connection with an espionage case in her country. They later find out that Chen and his colleagues are going to Japan, which they believe is in connection with the upcoming G20 international summit, and follow them there.

Back in Texas, Clark pursues Chen as part of his efforts to dismantle the sex trafficking ring. Meanwhile, Callahan becomes suspicious about Caruso and his “friend” as the bodies pile up. Clark eventually finds out that Chen's sister, Lily, is a business partner with Emilio Zambrano, a boss of the sex trafficking gang, and that they are holding Magdalena. He tries to rescue the young prostitute and kill Lily and Zambrano in their lakehouse when Callahan, along with Caruso, arrives in time to join the fight against Lily and her henchmen. She retrieves Magdalena and later arrests Clark for murder.

In the East China Sea, a Defense Intelligence Agency research vessel monitoring Chinese submarine traffic in the area suffers an engine malfunction and is being steered toward Chinese waters by the approaching tropical storm. President Ryan personally calls Zhao regarding the situation; the Chinese leader holds off on intercepting the ship as long as it does not reach Chinese waters. After its crew is rescued by a nearby Taiwanese patrol vessel, the surveillance ship is scuttled, overriding an attempt by a Chinese destroyer in the vicinity to seize it despite Zhao's assurances. As a result, President Ryan becomes distrustful of the Chinese leader.

Meanwhile, The Campus eventually find Chen and his colleagues in Tokyo, where they see Yukiko yet again tracking them. They engage in a gunfight, killing Chen and most of his henchmen. Intelligence from Chen's laptop, captured by The Campus, indicate Chen's connection to Li. Jack and Yukiko then go to the venue of the G20 summit as Zhao arrives for the summit with President Ryan. Jack recognizes the Chinese leader's bodyguards as the same men on Li's protection detail in Argentina (they were last-minute replacements for Zhao's agents who were suspiciously killed back in Beijing). He contacts his father in the middle of the summit meeting to notify him of the impending assassination plot. President Ryan relays his son's message to the Chinese leader as well as their respective principal bodyguards; Zhao's bodyguard kills the would-be assassin standing watch outside the meeting room, and the respective leaders are taken to safety.

Li as well as his co-conspirators are later arrested for treason. Meanwhile, Clark is released from police custody, much to Callahan's chagrin.

== Characters ==
=== The White House ===
- Jack Ryan: President of the United States
- Scott Adler: Secretary of state
- Mary Pat Foley: Director of national intelligence
- Robert Burgess: Secretary of defense
- Jay Canfield: Director of the Central Intelligence Agency
- Arnold "Arnie" van Damm: President Ryan's chief of staff
- Gary Montgomery: Special agent in charge of Presidential Protection Detail, United States Secret Service

=== The Campus ===
- John Clark
- Domingo "Ding" Chavez
- Jack Ryan, Jr.
- Dominic "Dom" Caruso
- Adara Sherman
- Bartosz "Midas" Jankowski
- Gavin Biery
- Lisanne Robertson: Campus director of transportation
- Monzaki Yukiko: Japanese intelligence operative

=== U.S. Coast Guard Air Station Port Angeles ===
- Lieutenant Commander Andrew Slaznik: MH-65 Dolphin helicopter pilot
- Petty Officer 2nd Class Lance Kitchen: Dolphin rescue swimmer

=== Cyclone-class patrol ship USS Rogue ===
- Lieutenant Commander Jimmy Akana: Captain
- Petty Officer 2nd Class Raymond Cooper: RQ-20 Puma operator

==== VBSS RHIB crew ====
- Lieutenant Junior Grade Steven Gitlin
- Chief Petty Officer Bill Knight
- Chief Petty Officer Bobby Rose
- Petty Officer Peavy
- Petty Officer Ridgeway

=== USS Meriwether ===
- Dave Holloway: Captain

=== People's Republic of China ===
- Zhao Chengzhi: General Secretary of the Chinese Communist Party
- Huang Ju: Colonel, Central Security Bureau; President Zhao's principal protection officer
- Li Zhengsheng: Minister of Foreign Affairs
- Xu Jinlong: Lieutenant general, People's Liberation Army; director of Central Security Bureau
- Ma Xiannian: General, People's Liberation Army
- Long Yun: Colonel, Central Security Bureau; Foreign Minister Li's principal protective officer

=== Texas ===
- Eddie Feng: Taiwanese journalist
- Magdalena Rojas: Thirteen-year-old victim of sex trafficking
- Blanca Limón: Thirteen-year-old victim of sex trafficking
- Ernie Pacheco, aka Matarife (The Slaughterer)
- Lupe: "Bottom girl" who works for Matarife
- Emilio Zambrano: Upper boss in cartel
- Roy Calderon: Texas Department of Public Safety trooper
- Kelsey Callahan: FBI special agent, commander of the Dallas Crimes Against Children Task Force
- John Olson: Special agent, FBI, on CAC Task Force

== Development ==
On February 20, 2017, The Real Book Spy announced that principal authors in the Tom Clancy universe, Mark Greaney and Grant Blackwood are leaving the franchise. Blackwood was replaced by Mike Maden for the summer-release Jack Ryan Jr. novels, while Greaney was replaced by Cameron for the fall-release Jack Ryan novels. Long-time Tom Clancy editor Tom Colgan stated that it was Greaney who recommended the author of the bestselling Jericho Quinn thrillers as his replacement: “I wish I could take credit for thinking of Marc Cameron for the Jack Sr. book but it was actually Mark Greaney who suggested him. He had just read Marc Cameron’s most recent book and thought he would be a good fit. Boy, was he right. From the start, Marc Cameron just really got Jack Ryan and John Clark and all the rest of the characters. I’m excited to see Mike and Marc continue the Clancy tradition.” Speaking of his choice, Greaney said: “Marc was the first and only name I gave him. His writing is both intelligent and action-packed, and Marc has an impressive personal resume that I am sure he will work into the novels to great effect.”

Cameron researched for the book by visiting Tokyo, Japan and Buenos Aires, Argentina, which would later feature in his book. He also visited the real-life U.S. Coast Guard Air Station in Port Angeles near Seattle, Washington, and interviewed its crew. Then he spent six months writing Power and Empire. To ensure consistency with the Clancy novels, he and his wife spent their winter in Cook Islands reading Clancy works, in what he dubbed as Clancy University. He said of the process: “I didn’t want to be a ventriloquist. It was clear I had to write a Marc Cameron book in the spirit of Tom Clancy. It would really be a disservice if I tried to imitate him. It would have been tinny.”

== Reception ==
=== Commercial ===
Power and Empire debuted at number six at the Combined Print & E-Book Fiction Books category, as well as number seven at the Hardcover Fiction Books category of the New York Times bestseller list for the week of December 17, 2017.

=== Critical ===
Power and Empire received generally positive reviews. Publishers Weekly praised Cameron: "All the writers who have contributed to this series since Clancy’s death have been good, but Cameron’s formidable performance puts him at the head of the pack." Kirkus Reviews hailed it as "Another turbocharged, take-no-prisoners Ryan yarn." In a featured review, thriller novel reviewer The Real Book Spy lauded the book as "a terrific, high-concept political thriller written with the same finesse and style that Clancy’s fans have come to expect."
