= Chain of Command (novel) =

2021 novel by Marc Cameron

- Author: Marc Cameron
- Audio read by: Scott Brick
- Language: English
- Series: Jack Ryan; The Campus
- Release number: 21
- Genre: Techno-thriller; Political thriller; Military fiction; Realistic fiction
- Publisher: G.P. Putnam's Sons
- Publication date: November 16, 2021
- Publication place: United States
- Media type: Print (Hardcover), Audio, eBook
- Pages: 512
- ISBN: 9780593188163
- Preceded by: Shadow of the Dragon
- Followed by: Red Winter

Chain of Command (stylized as Tom Clancy Chain of Command, Tom Clancy: Chain of Command, or Tom Clancy's Chain of Command in the United Kingdom) is a techno-thriller novel, written by Marc Cameron and published on November 16, 2021. It is his fifth book in the Jack Ryan series, which is part of the Ryanverse featuring characters created by Tom Clancy.

In the novel, President Ryan deals with an Indian billionaire who plots to intimidate him into repealing a pharmaceutical bill by kidnapping the First Lady. The book debuted at number seven on the New York Times bestseller list.

== Plot summary ==
U.S. President Jack Ryan deals with a multitude of crises as he prepares a bill regulating the production of pharmaceutical drugs, from ransomware cyberattacks across the country to deepfake videos of him circulating on the Internet. These are orchestrated by Indian billionaire Harjit Malhotra, who plots to intimidate President Ryan into repealing the bill as he is about to sell his own pharmaceutical company to German businessman Reinhardt Roth. Meanwhile, vice president Anthony Hargrave dies during a state visit to Japan; he is later succeeded by secretary of homeland security Mark Dehart.

Malhotra also tasks a shadow group of European mercenaries named Camarilla with kidnapping First Lady Dr. Cathy Ryan during a medical conference at the San Antonio River Walk. A team led by former British SAS operative Leo Debs practices the abduction at a ranch in Abilene, Texas, attracting the attention of self-proclaimed militiaman Royce Vetter. Debs tries to silence Vetter, killing his estranged wife and son before thwarting his attempt to rob an armored car. Vetter flees into a nearby mall, shooting and taking hostages before he is shot dead by police officer Steven "Chilly" Edwards.

Campus operatives Jack Ryan Jr., Bartosz "Midas" Jankowski, and Adara Sherman travel to Japan to investigate a lead regarding the cyberattacks, where they rescue two hackers from hitmen sent to kill them. They go to Japanese intelligence officer Yukiko Monzaki, who identifies one of the hitmen as an ex-Japanese Special Forces operator who had traveled to India many times. Meanwhile, husband-and-wife doctors Monte and Naomi Harper are kidnapped near the Wakhan Corridor by a rogue Chinese PLA officer ordered by Malhotra due to their association with Cathy.

Debs and his team push forward with their abduction of the First Lady, killing Secret Service personnel in the process. Outraged, President Ryan decides to temporarily step down. His political rival, Senator Michelle Chadwick, later survives an assassination attempt by a Camarilla operative. Campus director of operations John Clark orders Jack Jr. back to the White House to accompany his father, while Campus operative Dominic "Dom" Caruso uses his FBI credentials to assist in the search for the First Lady in Texas, accompanied by Domingo "Ding" Chavez.

In the Wakhan Corridor, Monte Harper manages to activate an emergency transponder on his watch, leading to a rescue operation from a U.S. Special Forces unit based in nearby Afghanistan. Meanwhile, Midas and Adara arrive in India to apprehend Malhotra, who had just signed the deal for his company's sale. His secretary, revealed to be a spy working for Roth, fatally shoots her boss, but not before Malhotra reveals Cathy's location to the Campus operatives.

Vetter's estranged daughter Rene Tatum investigates her father's death, leading her to Debs's hideout, where she contacts Edwards before she is captured. The police officer calls in the local SWAT team as he also recognizes Cathy. He shoots some of the Camarilla operators dead with a sniper rifle, rescuing Rene and the First Lady.

President Ryan returns to his position. Roth is assassinated by Camarilla operatives, led by the mysterious Spaniard Gil. Chilly is recruited by Clark and Chavez into the Campus.

== Characters ==
=== United States government ===
- Jack Ryan: President of the United States
- Anthony Hargrave: Vice president of the United States
- Dr. Caroline "Cathy" Ryan: First Lady of the United States
- Arnold "Arnie" van Damm: White House chief of staff
- Mary Pat Foley: Director of national intelligence
- Mark Dehart: Secretary of Homeland Security
- Dan Murray: United States attorney general
- Jay Canfield: Director of the Central Intelligence Agency
- Brian Wilson: Director of the Federal Bureau of Investigation
- Tom Vogel: Chairman of the Joint Chiefs of Staff
- Scott Adler: Secretary of state
- Robert Burgess: Secretary of defense
- Jason Bailey: Admiral of the United States Navy, chief White House medical officer
- Robbie Forestall: Commander of the United States Navy, adviser to President Ryan
- Carter Boone: Commander of the United States Navy, vice president's physician, White House medical office
- Marci Troxell: Commander of the United States Navy, First Lady's physician, White House medical office

=== United States Secret Service ===
- Lawrence Howe: Director
- Gary Montgomery: Special agent in charge, presidential detail
- Maureen "Mo" Richardson: Special agent in charge, FLOTUS detail
- Karen Sato: Assistant special agent in charge, FLOTUS detail
- Keenan Mulvaney: Special agent in charge, vice presidential detail

=== The Campus ===
- John Clark: Director of operations
- Domingo "Ding" Chavez: Assistant director of operations
- Dominic "Dom" Caruso: Operations officer
- Jack Ryan Jr.: Operations officer / senior analyst
- Adara Sherman: Operations officer
- Bartosz "Midas" Jankowski: Operations officer

=== Special Forces Operational Detachment Alpha 0312, Afghanistan ===
- Alan Brock: 18A, Captain
- Guzman: 180A, Warrant officer
- Eric "Ripper" Ward: 18B, Ops sergeant
- Jake Thelan: 18F, Intelligence sergeant
- Megnas: 18E, Communications sergeant

== Reception ==
=== Commercial ===
Chain of Command debuted at number seven at the Combined Print & E-Book Fiction Books category, as well as number 13 at the Hardcover Fiction Books category of the New York Times bestseller list for the week of December 5, 2021. It charted at number 13 on the Mass Market Books category of the same list in January 2023.

=== Critical ===
Publishers Weekly gave a mixed verdict, describing it as "admirable if flawed" and adding: "Cameron skillfully depicts the audacious and bloody kidnapping, but it’s all in service of weak and contrived motives, which a last-second gotcha moment makes superfluous anyway." Kirkus Reviews also regarded the plot as convoluted, but called it "another adventure-packed treat for fans of the Ryan family".
