= Red Winter =

2022 novel by Marc Cameron

- Author: Marc Cameron
- Audio read by: Scott Brick
- Language: English
- Series: Jack Ryan
- Release number: 22
- Genre: Techno-thriller; Spy fiction; Military fiction
- Publisher: G.P. Putnam's Sons
- Publication date: December 6, 2022
- Publication place: United States
- Media type: Print (Hardcover), Audio, eBook
- Pages: 432
- ISBN: 9780593422755
- Preceded by: Chain of Command
- Followed by: Command and Control

Red Winter (stylized as Tom Clancy Red Winter or Tom Clancy: Red Winter) is a techno-thriller novel, written by Marc Cameron and published on December 6, 2022. It is his sixth book in the Jack Ryan series, which is part of the Ryanverse featuring characters created by Tom Clancy.

A prequel, Red Winter is set after the events of The Hunt for Red October (1984) and follows Ryan as a CIA analyst who investigates an East German defector. The book debuted at number six on the New York Times bestseller list.

== Plot summary ==
In 1985, a mysterious figure hands out a computer disk and a note to U.S. Foreign Service officer Ruby Keller in West Berlin, Germany. The disk contains information on radar technology, while the note provides instructions to meet while warning of a mole at the U.S. station in West Berlin. Jack Ryan, CIA's liaison to MI6 in London, is tasked with investigating the possible East German defector, codenamed CALISTO. He is accompanied by CIA officer Mary Pat Foley and a surveillance team from Helsinki, Finland, while Special Activities Division (SAD) officer John Clark provides covert security for Ryan and Foley.

Meanwhile, a top-secret F-117 Nighthawk stealth plane crashes into the Virgin Mountains in Nevada during a test flight. East German foreign intelligence (HVA) agent Garit Richter picks up a piece of the wreckage embedded with radiation-absorbent material. The pilot, Boden Lee, survives the crash and witnesses Richter killing two UFO watchers before fleeing the scene. FBI legal attache to London Daniel Murray is assigned to lead the manhunt for Richter, accompanied by special agent Betty Harris.

Keller's colleague, CIA officer Jennifer North, is revealed to be coerced into working for Stasi officer Rolfe Schneider after having slept with him; she had been disillusioned by her colleague Lane Buckley taking credit for her previous intelligence operation, which subsequently led to his promotion as assistant deputy director of operations at CIA. Schneider abducts Keller and puts her at Hohenschönhausen Prison in East Berlin, where she is tortured by prison guard Mitzi Graff. Meanwhile, CALISTO is revealed to be Stasi major Kurt Pfeiffer, who meets Ryan and Foley at an abandoned building in East Berlin and identifies North as the mole.

After Pfeiffer leaves, Ryan and Foley run into his asset, professional singer Elke Hauptman, who initially wanted to kill her handler for tormenting her and had subsequently overheard their conversation. They encounter a KGB officer, who fights Ryan and wounds Foley as she shoots him dead. They are met by Elke's husband Uwe, a physicist at Humboldt University, who had suspected his wife of having an affair. They discover that Pfeiffer had taken his research on radar technology through Elke and passed it to Keller.

Nearby, Clark kills a group of KGB agents who had Uwe under surveillance. He later rescues his son Hans from a trio of German assassins, who had been tasked by Schneider with eliminating Pfeiffer and had killed most of the CIA surveillance team from Helsinki. Meanwhile, North meets Ryan and Foley and offers to accompany them and the Hauptman family across the border to West Berlin through a secret tunnel. They are met by Schneider, but Ryan agrees to give up Pfeiffer in exchange for letting them escape. Schneider later kills North.

Pfeiffer is arrested by the CIA chief of station in West Berlin, who gives him to Stasi in exchange for Keller. Acting on a lead provided by Elke, Murray and Harris arrest Richter at a train station in Winnemucca, Nevada. Graff is killed by a CIA asset who had sheltered Clark in East Berlin.

== Characters ==
- Jack Ryan, Sr.: CIA liaison to MI6, London
- Dr. Caroline "Cathy" Ryan: Jack's wife, ophthalmic surgeon
- John Clark: CIA operations officer, Special Activities Division
- Mary Pat Foley: CIA operations officer, Moscow
- Daniel Murray: FBI legal attache, London
- Admiral James Greer: deputy director (Intelligence), CIA
- Robert Ritter: deputy director (Operations), CIA
- Betty Harris: FBI special agent, Washington, D.C., Field Office
- Lane Buckley: assistant deputy director (Operations), CIA
- Ed Foley: CIA chief of station, Moscow
- Skip Hulse: CIA chief of West Berlin Base
- Jen North: CIA operations officer, West Berlin Base
- Billy Dunn: CIA operations officer, West Berlin Base
- Carol Morandini: CIA cypher clerk, West Berlin Base
- Jason Newell: CIA chief of East Berlin Station
- Truly Bishop: CIA officer, East Berlin Station
- Ruby Keller: State Department Foreign Service officer, USBER
- Boden Lee: F-117 pilot, 4450th Tactical Group, Nellis Air Force Base, Tonopah, Nevada
- Rolfe Schneider: Stasi officer/Romeo
- Elke Hauptman: professional singer, East Berlin
- Uwe Hauptman: physicist, Humboldt University, East Berlin
- Hans Hauptman: Elke and Uwe's six-year-old son
- Kurt Pfeiffer: Stasi major, East Berlin, Elke Hauptman's handler
- Evgeni Zima: KGB colonel, East Berlin
- Ivan Popov: KGB major, East Berlin
- Vladimir Mikhailov: KGB junior officer, East Berlin
- Garit Richter: Stasi HVA illegal in the United States
- Heather Beasley: UFO watcher
- Dieter Fuchs: former thief turned assassin
- Felix Becker: former East German Olympic gymnast turned assassin
- Selma Kraus: former East German Olympic swimmer turned assassin
- Mitzi Graff: Stasi guard, Hohenschönhausen Prison
- Gunter Wolfe: Stasi guard, Hohenschönhausen Prison

== Reception ==
=== Commercial ===
Red Winter debuted at number six at the Combined Print & E-Book Fiction Books category, as well as number nine at the Hardcover Fiction Books category of the New York Times bestseller list for the week of December 25, 2022. It charted at number two on the Mass Market Books category of the same list in December 2023.

=== Critical ===
Kirkus Reviews praised the book: "So well-adapted to the entire series, this could have been the late Tom Clancy’s second novel." Publishers Weekly also praised the novel's focus on the Cold War setting, adding that it "opens the field to further adventures of the young Jack Ryan".
