= Ward Larsen =

American novelist

- Born: March 14, 1961 (age 65)
- Occupation: Writer
- Writing career
- Genres: Thriller, espionage thriller
- Notable works: The Perfect Assassin; Code Zero
- Website: wardlarsen.com

Ward Palmer Larsen (born March 14, 1961) is an American novelist. He is known for his Assassin series of thriller novels.

== Career ==
Larsen was a former United States Air Force fighter pilot, flying 22 missions in Operation Desert Storm. He also served as an airline captain for Southwest Airlines. Larsen has also worked in law enforcement and is a trained aircraft accident investigator.

Larsen published his debut novel, The Perfect Assassin, in 2004. Part of the Assassin series featuring main character David Slaton, it was followed by nine sequels and a novella. Larsen also wrote the Jammer Davis series of thriller novels, as well as the standalone novel Cutting Edge (2018).

In 2026, Larsen collaborated with Brad Thor on the thriller novel Code Zero. The book is also in development as a Netflix film adaptation, with Peter Berg producing and Nic Pizzolatto writing the screenplay. In the same year, Larsen published his sole entry in Tom Clancy's Ryanverse, Tom Clancy: Rules of Engagement.

== Bibliography ==
=== David Slaton / Assassin series ===
- The Perfect Assassin (2004)
- Assassin's Game (2014)
- Assassin's Silence (2016)
- Assassin's Code (2017)
- Assassin's Run (2018)
- Assassin's Revenge (2019)
- Assassin's Strike (2020)
- Assassin's Dawn (novella) (2021)
- Assassin's Edge (2022)
- Assassin's Mark (2023)
- Dark Vector (2025)

=== Jammer Davis series ===
- Fly By Wire (2010)
- Fly By Night (2011)
- Passenger 19 (2016)

=== Jack Ryan series ===
Featuring characters created by Tom Clancy

- Tom Clancy: Rules of Engagement (2026)

=== Standalone ===
- Stealing Trinity (2008)
- Cutting Edge (2018)
- Deep Fake (2023)
- Cold Zero (with Brad Thor) (2026)
- Fire Fall (with Brad Thor) (2027)
