= Military fiction =

Fiction focusing on military activities

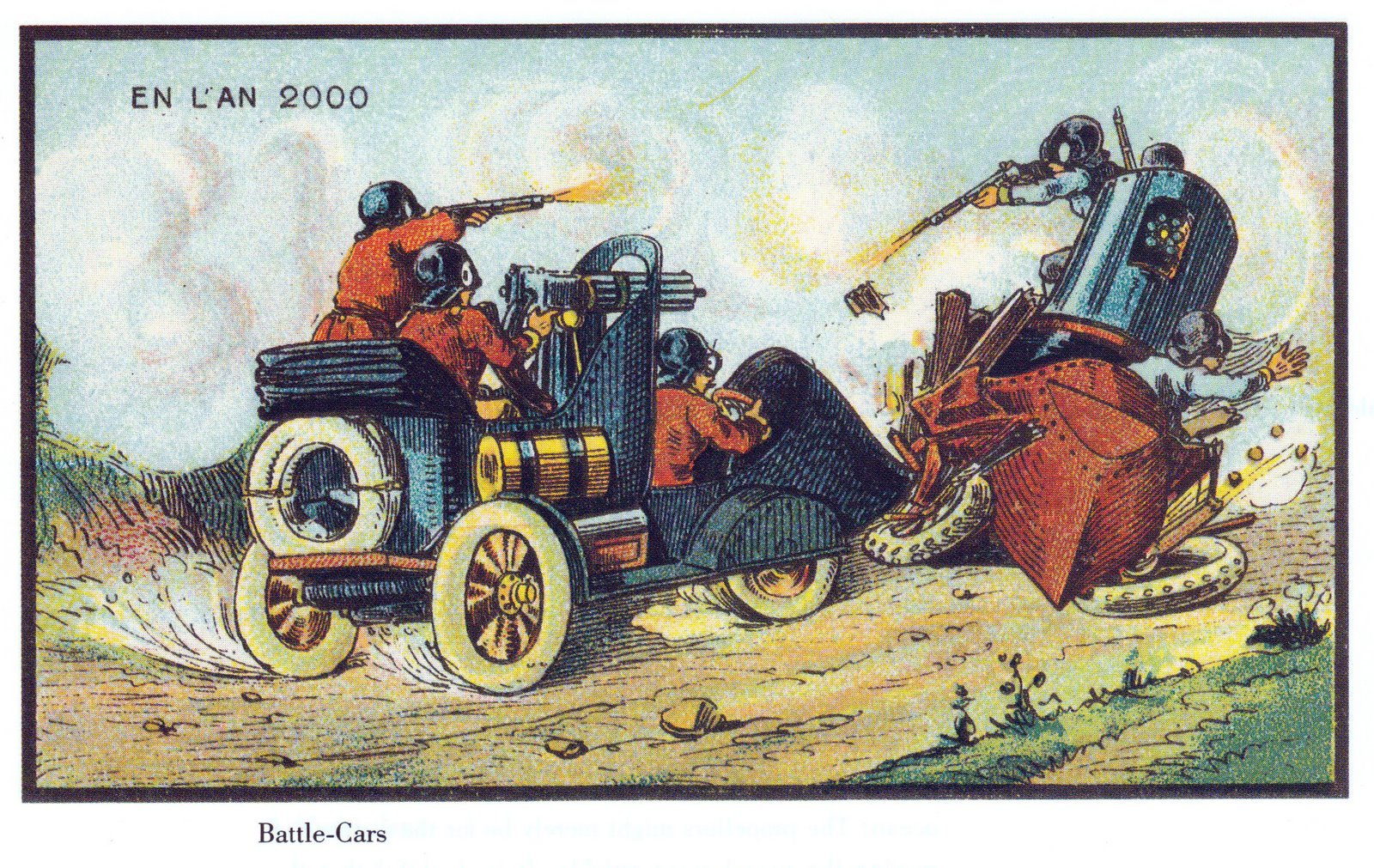
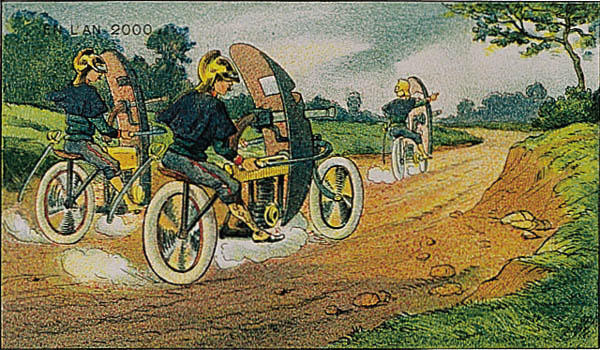
These illustrations, created in 1910, depict a visionary perspective on the potential evolution of military vehicles and motorcycles by the year 2000.

Military fiction is a fiction genre focusing on military activities, such as war, battles, combat, fighting; or military life.

== Subgenres of military fiction ==
Types of military fiction include:

- War novels, including written military fiction
- War films, military fiction in cinema
- Military and war video games

Subgenres of military fiction include:

- Military science fiction
- Naval fiction
- Indian military fiction (of India)

== Works and elements of military fiction ==
Works of military fiction:

- List of military science fiction works and authors

Elements of military fiction:

- Military spacecraft in fiction

== Creators of military fiction ==
- Military-entertainment complex
- List of military science fiction works and authors

== See also ==
- Adventure fiction
- Military sci-fi
- Chanbara (genre)
- Chivalric romance (genre)
- Military history
- W. Y. Boyd Literary Award for Excellence in Military Fiction
- Western (genre)
- Wuxia (genre)
