= Defense Protocol =

2024 novel by Andrews and Wilson

- Authors: Brian Andrews; Jeffrey Wilson
- Audio read by: Scott Brick
- Language: English
- Series: Jack Ryan
- Release number: 25
- Genre: Techno-thriller; Military fiction; Realistic fiction
- Publisher: G.P. Putnam's Sons
- Publication date: December 3, 2024
- Publication place: United States
- Media type: Print (Hardcover), Audio, eBook
- Pages: 512
- ISBN: 9780593717974
- Preceded by: Act of Defiance
- Followed by: Executive Power

Defense Protocol (stylized as Tom Clancy Defense Protocol or Tom Clancy: Defense Protocol) is a techno-thriller novel, written by Brian Andrews and Jeffrey Wilson and published on December 3, 2024. It is their second book in the Jack Ryan series, which is part of the Ryanverse featuring characters created by Tom Clancy. Defense Protocol is the first of two books by Andrews and Wilson featuring Ryan to be published in the same year, the other being Act of Defiance.

In the novel, President Ryan must prevent the Chinese president from invading Taiwan. It debuted at number ten on the New York Times bestseller list.

== Plot summary ==
President of China Li Jian Jun authorizes Operation Sea Serpent, a military exercise secretly aimed at invading Taiwan. The battle plan was originally written by defense minister Qin Haiyu, who finds out that its battle damage estimates regarding a potential confrontation with the U.S. Navy had been doctored to fit President Li's wishes. Fearful for his life after minister of foreign affairs Cheng Kai was disappeared two weeks ago for privately objecting to President Li's plan to annex Taiwan, Qin covertly makes contact with the U.S. ambassador's deputy chief of mission and CIA officer Scott Kincaid in Beijing, offering to defect with his family in exchange for informing the Americans about Sea Serpent's real objective.

After hearing about Qin's offer to defect, U.S. President Jack Ryan authorizes an interagency task force led by Office of Naval Intelligence (ONI) analyst Katie Ryan, his youngest daughter, to gather intelligence crucial to the USS Ronald Reagan and USS Nimitz carrier strike groups as they prepare to defend Taiwan. President Ryan also approves a joint international task force modeled on the counterterrorist organization Rainbow, led by its former commander John Clark and his deputy Domingo "Ding" Chavez, to facilitate the extraction of Qin.

Kincaid tasks his asset Qiu Lei, known as the Night Spider by Chinese intelligence (MSS), with covertly meeting Qin at the Liulichang district. They evade MSS operatives tailing Qin and hide at a restaurant. President Li expels the U.S. ambassador and his staff from Beijing, rendering Kincaid unable to help Qiu extract the defense minister out of the country. Meanwhile, Clark's team extracts Qin's wife and twin daughters from a hotel in Maldives. They separately enter Beijing, but Chavez is briefly detained by MSS at the airport and a French team member is forced to break contact after being tailed by MSS operatives.

President Li announces a maritime blockade at Taiwan Strait, citing Qin's assassination and the subsequent kidnapping of his family by the CIA as his reasons. President Ryan responds by repositioning the destroyer USS Jason Dunham through Taiwan Strait to join the USS Reagan strike group east of Taipei. The destroyer arrives at the Chinese Maritime Exclusion Zone at Taiwan Strait, where it nearly collides with the PLA Navy's Type 055 destroyer Nanchang; its political commissar then fires an anti-ship missile at the USS Dunham before he is restrained by his commanding officer. The USS Dunham shoots down the missile and proceeds through the exclusion zone, with the Nanchang shadowing them.

Meanwhile, Katie deduces that a Chinese Special Forces unit may stage a false flag attack after seizing a Taiwanese anti-ship battery site at Huayu Island, justifying President Li's invasion of Taiwan. She is also tasked by Kincaid with extracting Qin, the Night Spider, and Clark's team out of mainland China. Katie meets with senior CIA officer Larry Sexton, Qiu's original handler and lover, who suggests a rendezvous point at a Peking Man museum outside Beijing they had visited years ago. From there, Katie comes up with a plan for Qin, the Night Spider, and Clark's team to proceed southeast to Tianjin, where the Korean merchant vessel Capella can smuggle them to Incheon in nearby South Korea.

Katie and her task force are evacuated from Penghu Island to the USS Dunham, while two separate Navy SEAL teams are assigned to defend the Huayu anti-ship battery site and assist in exfiltrating the defense minister out of Tianjin. Meanwhile, Qin and the Night Spider arrive at the Peking Man museum, where they get into a gunfight with two MSS operatives before Clark and his Australian team member rescue them. They proceed to Tianjin, where a Navy SEAL team helps them board the Capella.

The other Navy SEAL team arrives at Huayu, too late to stop the Chinese Special Forces from launching anti-ship missiles at the Nanchang, but the USS Dunham quickly shoots them down. The Nanchang is ordered to attack Huayu, but Katie persuades its captain not to fire on the island. The Navy SEAL team at Huayu loses two men as they are later rescued. President Li is later disappeared, and General Secretary Xu Chao orders the Nanchang to stand down and allows the Capella safe passage to South Korea, averting the crisis.

== Characters ==
=== Washington, D.C. ===
- Jack Ryan Sr.: President of the United States
- Arnold "Arnie" van Damm: White House Chief of Staff
- Mary Pat Foley: Director of National Intelligence
- Scott Adler: Secretary of State
- Robert Burgess: Secretary of Defense
- Admiral Lawrence Kent, USN: Chairman of the Joint Chiefs of Staff
- Major General Bruce Kudryk, USA: Joint Chiefs of Staff

=== China ===
- Li Jian Jun: President of the People's Republic of China
- Qin Haiyu: Minister of Defense
- Cheng Kai: Minister of Foreign Affairs
- Qiu Lei: the Night Spider
- Scott Kincaid: Deputy Chief of U.S. Mission, Beijing

=== Task Force 25 ===
- Lieutenant Commander Katie Ryan: ONI
- Intelligence Specialist 2nd Class "Bubba" Pettigrew: ONI
- Lieutenant Junior Grade John Conza: ONI
- Andrew "Drewski" Miaoulis: Ground Branch
- Ted James: CIA
- Simran "Sam" Bakshi: CIA
- Ben Hart: Ground Branch
- Lori Tengco: DIA
- Lou Donatelli: DIA
- Commander Beechum: Navy SEAL
- Master Chief Hurley: Navy SEAL
- Senior Chief Max Harden: Navy SEAL
- Chief Reed: Navy SEAL
- Skip Anderson: Navy SEAL
- Scott Todd: Navy SEAL

=== CNS Nanchang Type 055 Destroyer ===
- Captain Shen Huaqing: Commanding Officer
- Colonel Sun Ching-Kuo: Political Commissar

=== USS Jason Dunham ===
- Commander Jeffrey Kreutz: Commanding Officer
- Lieutenant Commander Karen Cook: Executive Officer
- Lieutenant Commander Mitchell Horrillo: Combat Systems Officer

=== Task Force 99 ===
- John Clark: Task force leader
- Domingo "Ding" Chavez: Deputy task force leader
- Daniel Wu: Chinese-born Special Boat Service (SBS) officer
- Lee Hyori: South Korean Navy Special Warfare Flotilla (WARFLOT) officer
- Wilhelm Bauer: German Federal Intelligence Service (BND) officer
- Charlotte "Charlie" Adams: Australian Special Air Service Regiment (SAS) intelligence officer
- Henri Toussaint: French General Directorate for Internal Security (DGSI) officer

== Development ==
After depicting Russian submarines in their previous Jack Ryan novel Act of Defiance, Andrews and Wilson tackled Taiwan for Defense Protocol. They stated their reason: "Taiwan stood out as a critical area with the potential to spark war or shift global power. China’s plans to 'reunify' Taiwan have been public knowledge for decades—it’s not a matter of if but when and how. That made it a perfect setting for fiction."

== Reception ==
=== Commercial ===
Defense Protocol debuted at number ten at the Combined Print & E-Book Fiction Books category of the New York Times bestseller list for the week of December 22, 2024. It also charted at number nine at the Mass Market Books category of the same list for the month of December 2025.

=== Critical ===
Publishers Weekly reviewed the book: "This is mostly business as usual, with Katie now firmly established as one of the Ryan family’s freedom fighters. Series fans will be satisfied." Kirkus Reviews praised the novel as "plenty of excitement for Clancy fans".
