= Xi'an Reservoir =

Reservoir in Taiwan

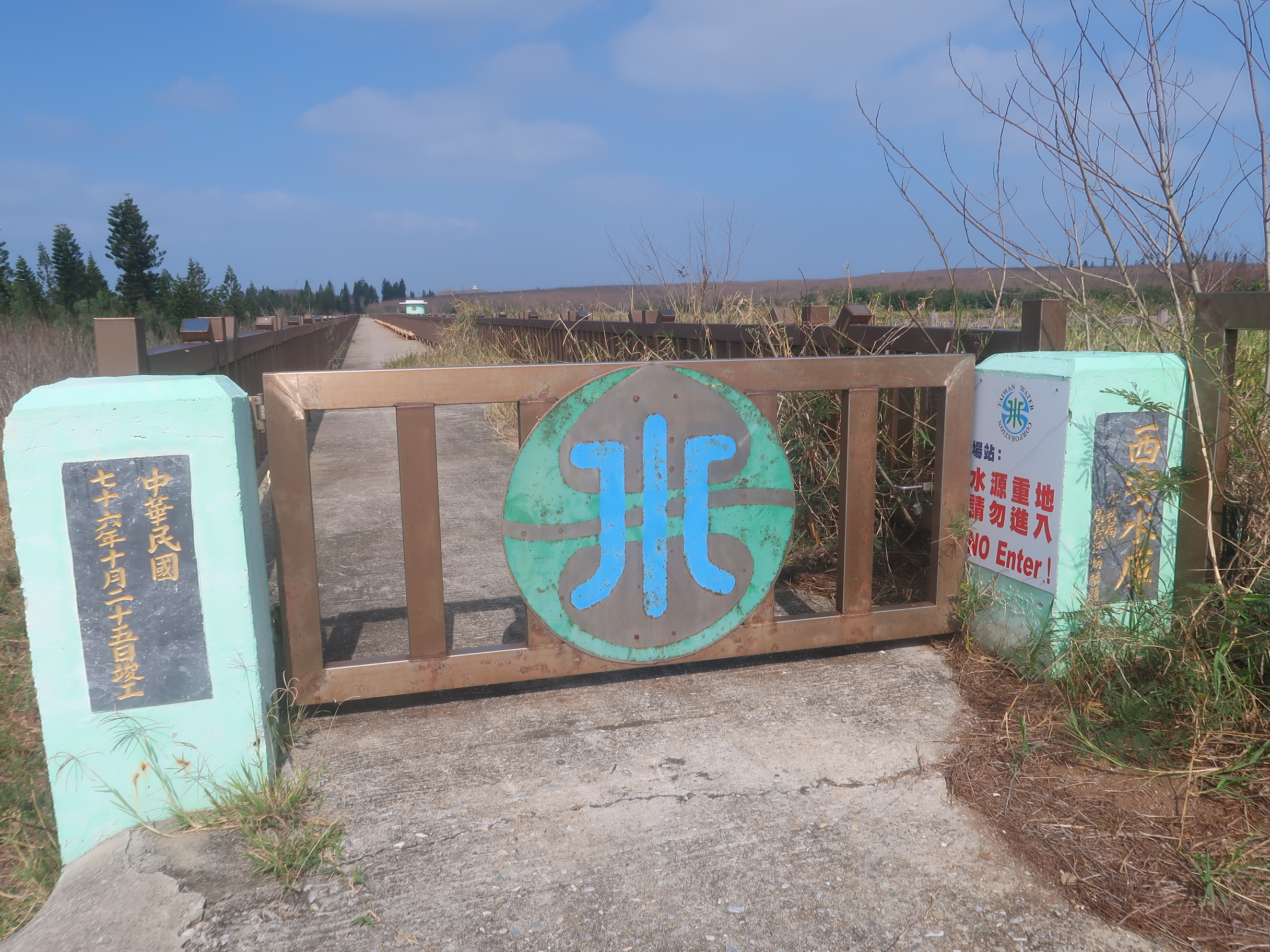
- Interactive map of Xi'an Reservoir
- Location: Wang'an Township, Penghu County
- Coordinates: 23°21′53″N 119°29′50″E
- Purpose: public water supply
- Construction began: July 1985

Xi'an Reservoir (Chinese: 西安水庫; pinyin: Xī'ān shuǐkù), also known as Hsi-an Reservoir, is a reservoir on the Penghu Islands, located in Wang'an Township, Penghu County, Taiwan.

The construction of Xi'an Reservoir started in July 1985, and was completed in October 1987. It has a total storage capacity of 240,000 cubic meters and a catchment area of 0.82 square kilometers.
