= Act of Defiance (novel) =

2024 novel by Andrews and Wilson

- Authors: Brian Andrews; Jeffrey Wilson
- Audio read by: Scott Brick
- Language: English
- Series: Jack Ryan; The Campus
- Release number: 24
- Genre: Techno-thriller; Military fiction; Realistic fiction
- Publisher: G.P. Putnam's Sons
- Publication date: May 21, 2024
- Publication place: United States
- Media type: Print (Hardcover), Audio, eBook
- Pages: 560
- ISBN: 9780593422878
- Preceded by: Command and Control
- Followed by: Defense Protocol

Act of Defiance (stylized as Tom Clancy Act of Defiance or Tom Clancy: Act of Defiance) is a techno-thriller novel, written by Brian Andrews and Jeffrey Wilson and published on May 21, 2024. It is their first book in the Jack Ryan series, which is part of the Ryanverse featuring characters created by Tom Clancy. Act of Defiance is the first of two books by Andrews and Wilson featuring Ryan to be published in the same year, the other being Defense Protocol.

In the novel, President Ryan deals with a rogue Russian nuclear submarine forty years after the events of The Hunt for Red October (1984). It debuted at number ten on the New York Times bestseller list.

== Plot summary ==
In December 1984, Soviet engineer Dimitri Gorov tries to provide the schematics for the Typhoon-class ballistic missile submarine Red October to the CIA in exchange for political asylum with his family in the United States. However, the extraction was aborted after Red October's commander Marko Ramius had already defected and offered the submarine to the U.S. Navy. (Note: As depicted in The Hunt for Red October) Distraught, Gorov drinks himself to a stupor and accidentally drowns at the Neva River.

Forty years later, Gorov's son Konstantin is in command of the Russian Navy's latest submarine Belgorod, which leaves from the Severodvinsk port for sea trials before heading west, seemingly under orders from Russian president Nikita Yermilov. Office of Naval Intelligence analyst Katie Ryan, U.S. President Jack Ryan's youngest daughter, investigates the Belgorod's modified torpedo tubes, which house Status-6 torpedoes capable of disrupting undersea sonar and communications systems across the Atlantic Ocean, as well as Gorov's history.

Director of national intelligence Mary Pat Foley tasks Campus director of operations John Clark to reach out to Russian foreign intelligence (SVR) officer Erik Dovzhenko, a double agent working for the CIA, (Note: Dovzhenko had previously appeared in Oath of Office) to gather information about the Belgorod. Dovzhenko warns Clark of a secret cabal of Russian military hardliners, led by Colonel General Nikolai Ilyin, who plot to launch a Status-6 torpedo from the Belgorod into Norfolk Naval Station, blame Yermilov for the attack, and overthrow him in the process. Dovzhenko is later killed by Wagner Group mercenaries ordered by Ilyin as Clark escapes.

Katie boards the USS Gerald R. Ford in the northern Atlantic Ocean to brief its carrier strike group about the Belgorod. Meanwhile, President Ryan orders a Navy SEAL team to seize the Finitor, a Russian spy boat disguised as a Cyprus-flagged research vessel, which had mapped out the Distributed Agile Submarine Hunting (DASH) deep ocean sonar node near the eastern United States. In response, the Russian Northern Fleet positions itself near the Ford's strike group. A pair of F/A-18 Super Hornets from the strike group later engages with two Russian MiG-29K fighters from the Northern Fleet, placing both sides on high alert.

Acting on a lead provided by Dovzhenko, Clark infiltrates the port of Severodvinsk with his fellow Campus operatives Domingo "Ding" Chavez, Bartosz "Midas" Jankowski, and Adara Sherman. They initiate contact with the port's weapons engineer, who confirms that the Belgorod's inventory includes Status-6 torpedoes, two of them nuclear-armed. Meanwhile, Konstantin steers the Belgorod to the DASH node and launches an unmanned underwater vehicle (UUV) to disable one of its hubs, which had been identified by the Finitor earlier. His weapons engineer Morozov, fearful about his commander's failing health influencing his mission orders, hides the submarine's noise augmentation device, causing the Virginia-class submarine USS Washington to track down the Belgorod.

Katie boards the USS Washington to deliver intelligence about the Belgorod and its captain, who she finds out had lost his wife and unborn child and has pancreatic cancer. President Ryan contacts Yermilov through the Moscow-Washington hotline and informs him about the cabal. The Russian president orders the Northern Fleet to stand down and tasks the Yasen-class submarine Severodvinsk to intercept the Belgorod and sink her.

The USS Washington briefly loses contact with Belgorod after Konstantin finds the noise augmentor and identifies Morozov as the saboteur. He launches the two nuclear Status-6 torpedoes, targeting Norfolk Naval Station and the Ford strike group. The USS Washington destroys one of the torpedoes headed for the strike group, sustaining some damage, while the second Status-6 torpedo was destroyed by Mark 45 torpedoes from the nearby USS Indiana before it reaches Norfolk. Meanwhile, the Severodvinsk tracks down the Belgorod and attacks it, but the latter avoids significant damage from the resulting explosion by quickly resurfacing, as its crew abandons the ship.

Clark and his team enter Moscow and track down Ilyin and his co-conspirators to a tavern, where he later assassinates them. President Ryan tells Katie about his involvement in finding the Red October.

== Characters ==
=== The Ryan family ===
- Jack Ryan: President of the United States
- Dr. Caroline "Cathy" Ryan: First Lady of the United States
- Jack Ryan Jr.: Campus operative
- Dr. Olivia "Sally" Ryan: Ophthalmic surgeon
- Kathleen "Katie" Ryan: Lieutenant Commander (Select), U.S. Navy
- Kyle Ryan: Lieutenant, USN

=== Washington, D.C. ===
- Scott Adler: Secretary of state
- Arnold "Arnie" van Damm: White House chief of staff
- Mary Pat Foley: Director of national intelligence
- Admiral Lawrence Kent, USN: Chairman of the Joint Chiefs of Staff
- Major General Bruce Kudryk, U.S. Army: Joint Chiefs of Staff

=== CIA team ===
- Ginnie
- Tom
- James
- Spencer

=== The Campus ===
- John Clark: Director of operations
- Domingo "Ding" Chavez: Assistant director of operations
- Adara Sherman: Operations officer
- Bartosz "Midas" Jankowski: Operations officer

=== USS Gerald R. Ford Carrier Strike Group ===
- Rear Admiral Bentley Kiplinger, USN: Strike group commander
- Captain Otis Mackenzie, USN: Commanding officer, USS Gerald R. Ford
- Captain Sarah "Baby" Williams, USN: Executive officer, USS Gerald R. Ford
- Commander Martin Vasquez, USN: CAG, Carrier Air Wing 8
- Commander James "Spacecamp" Huddleston, USN: DCAG, Carrier Air Wing 8
- Commander Brian "Mr. Pibb" Hanson, USN: Executive officer, VFA-31
- LCDR Jaya Kumari, USN: Naval intelligence officer on the Ford
- IS2 Caspar, USN: LPO of the intelligence shop, USS Gerald R. Ford

=== USS Washington ===
- Commander Clint Houston, USN: Commanding officer
- LCDR Dennis Knepper, USN: Executive officer
- LCDR Jackie "Juggernaut" Guevara, USN: Weapons officer

=== USS Indiana ===
- Commander Bresnahan, USN: Commanding officer
- LCDR Pifer, USN: Executive officer
- Xavier Harris: Sonar Technician Second Class
- Chief Schonauer: Sonar supervisor

=== K-329 Belgorod ===
- Captain First Rank Konstantin Gorov: Commanding officer
- Captain Second Rank Yuri Stepanov: First officer
- Captain Lieutenant Blok: Conning officer
- Starshina First Class Fyodorov: Quartermaster
- Captain Lieutenant Ivan Tarasov: Engineering officer

=== K-560 Severodvinsk ===
- Captain First Rank Lev Denikin: Commanding officer
- Captain Second Rank Mats Tamm: First officer

=== Russia ===
- Nikita Yermilov: President of Russia
- Colonel General Oleg Andreyev: Director, National Defense Management Center
- Admiral Ivan Boldyrev: Commander in chief, Russian Naval Fleet
- General Aralovich: Director of the FSB
- Colonel General Nikolai Ilyin: Former KGB, retired
- Admiral Rodionov: Director of the GRU
- Erik Dovzhenko

=== JSOC SEAL Team ===
- SOCS Max Harden, USN: SEAL strike team leader
- SOC Reed Johnson, USN: SEAL / special operations combat medic
- SOC Billy Harper, USN
- SO1 Owen Delacorte, USN
- SO1 Marty Rich, USN
- SO2 Scott Todd, USN
- SOCS Dwight Merrell, USN

=== Other characters ===
- Captain Russ Ferguson, USN: Commanding officer, Nimitz Warfare Analysis Center
- Intelligence Specialist Second Class "Bubba" Pettigrew, USN: Office of Naval Intelligence
- Dr. Ronald Jones
- Captain Pete Miller, USN (retired): Undersea Weapons Program manager at the Naval Research Lab
- Matthew Reilly: Retired CIA case officer

== Development ==
In 2023, Andrews and Wilson were announced as the new writers of the Jack Ryan series, succeeding Marc Cameron. Speaking about their approach to the franchise, the authors said: "Some people consider the thriller genre mindless escapism, but we have a very different take. For us, storytelling is something we take very seriously—we view it as a professional opportunity to highlight the integrity, courage, and professionalism of the men and women in the military and intelligence communities who tirelessly serve this great nation without ever asking for anything in return." Clancy's longtime editor Tom Colgan released a statement: "We're extremely excited to welcome Andrews & Wilson to the Clancy team. As Navy veterans themselves, they will bring the authenticity and creativity that Clancy readers demand to the Jack Ryan series."

Act of Defiance was billed as a direct sequel to The Hunt for Red October, which Andrews and Wilson also credited for joining the Navy. The authors added: "We wanted to achieve what Top Gun: Maverick did in film for Hunt in print!"

A continuity error depicted Katie and Kyle Ryan as twins; Katie first appeared in Debt of Honor while Kyle's first appearance was in The Bear and the Dragon.

== Reception ==
=== Commercial ===
Act of Defiance debuted at number ten at the Combined Print & E-Book Fiction Books category, as well as number eleven at the Hardcover Fiction Books category of the New York Times bestseller list for the week of June 9, 2024. It also charted at number ten on the Mass Market Books category of the same list in March 2025.

=== Critical ===
Kirkus Reviews praised the book: "Well-paced excitement as the Ryans come through again." Thriller novel reviewer The Real Book Spy hailed it as a "worthy follow-up to The Hunt for Red October", adding that "it's the best Jack Ryan novel since Clancy was in his prime...and is without question one of the best books of the year. Maybe even the decade."
