= Dongji Island =

Island west of Taiwan

Native name: 東吉嶼
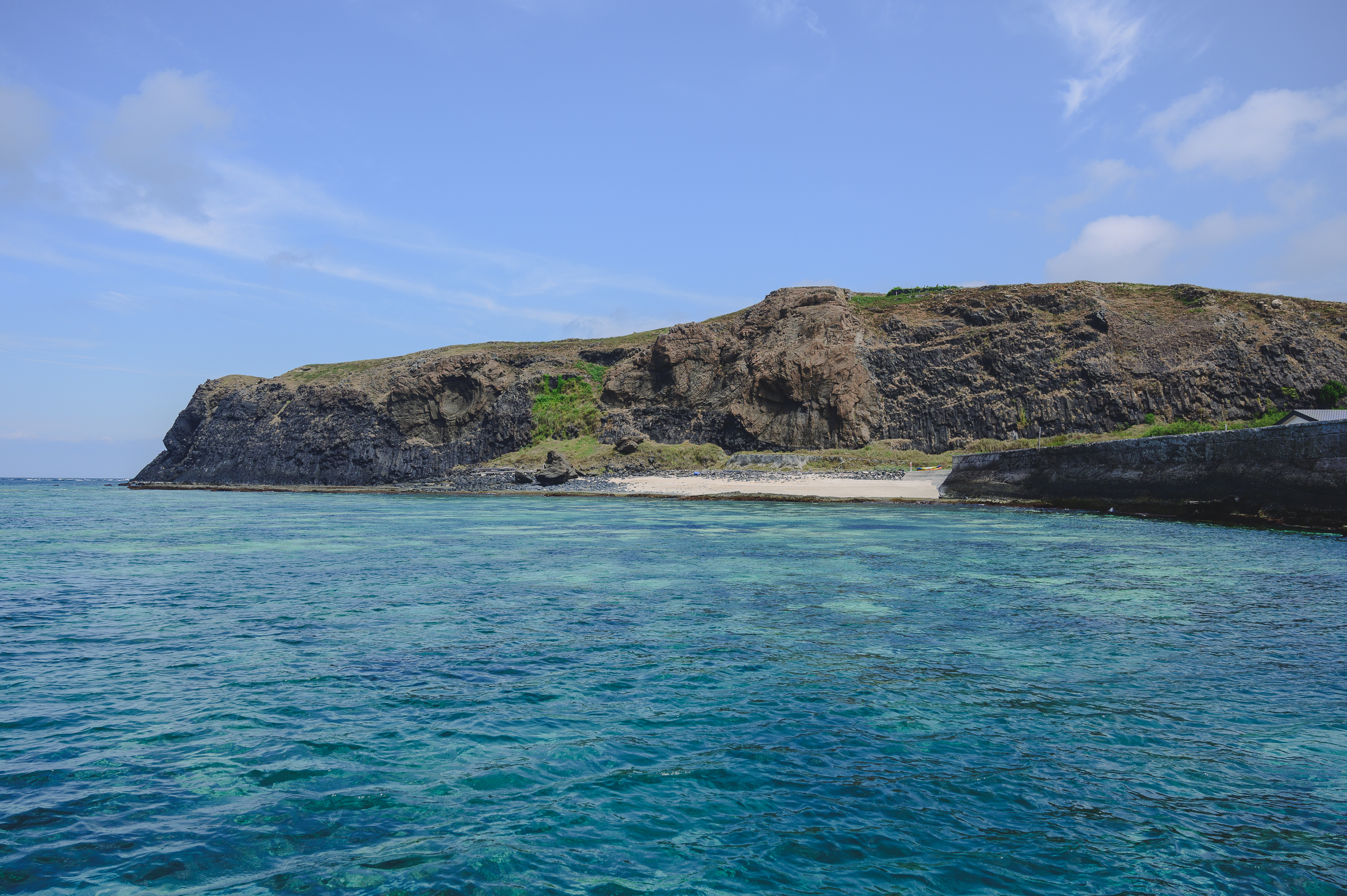
- Interactive map of Dongji Island

Geography
- Location: southeastern Wangan Township, Penghu County (the Pescadores), Republic of China (Taiwan)
- Coordinates: 23°15′5.75″N 119°40′21.41″E
- Area: 1.7712 km^{2} (0.6839 sq mi)
- Highest elevation: 47 m (154 ft)

Administration
- Republic of China (Taiwan)
- Province: Taiwan (streamlined)
- County: Penghu
- Rural Township: Wangan

Demographics
- Population: 261 (November 2017)
- Pop. density: 147.3577/km^{2} (381.6547/sq mi)

Additional information
- Time zone: National Standard Time (UTC+8)

Location of Dongji Island

Dongji Island / Dongji Islet / Tungchi Island (Chinese: 東吉嶼; Hanyu Pinyin: Dōngjí Yǔ; Tongyong Pinyin: Dongjí Yǔ; Wade–Giles: Tung^{1}-chi^{2} Yü^{3}; Pe̍h-ōe-jī: Tang-kiat-sū) is an island in Dongji Village (東吉村), Wangan Township, Penghu County (the Pescadores), Taiwan. Dongji Island has also been known as Nandongyu (南東嶼).

The island is the site of the Dongji Island Lighthouse (Dongji Lighthouse).

== History ==
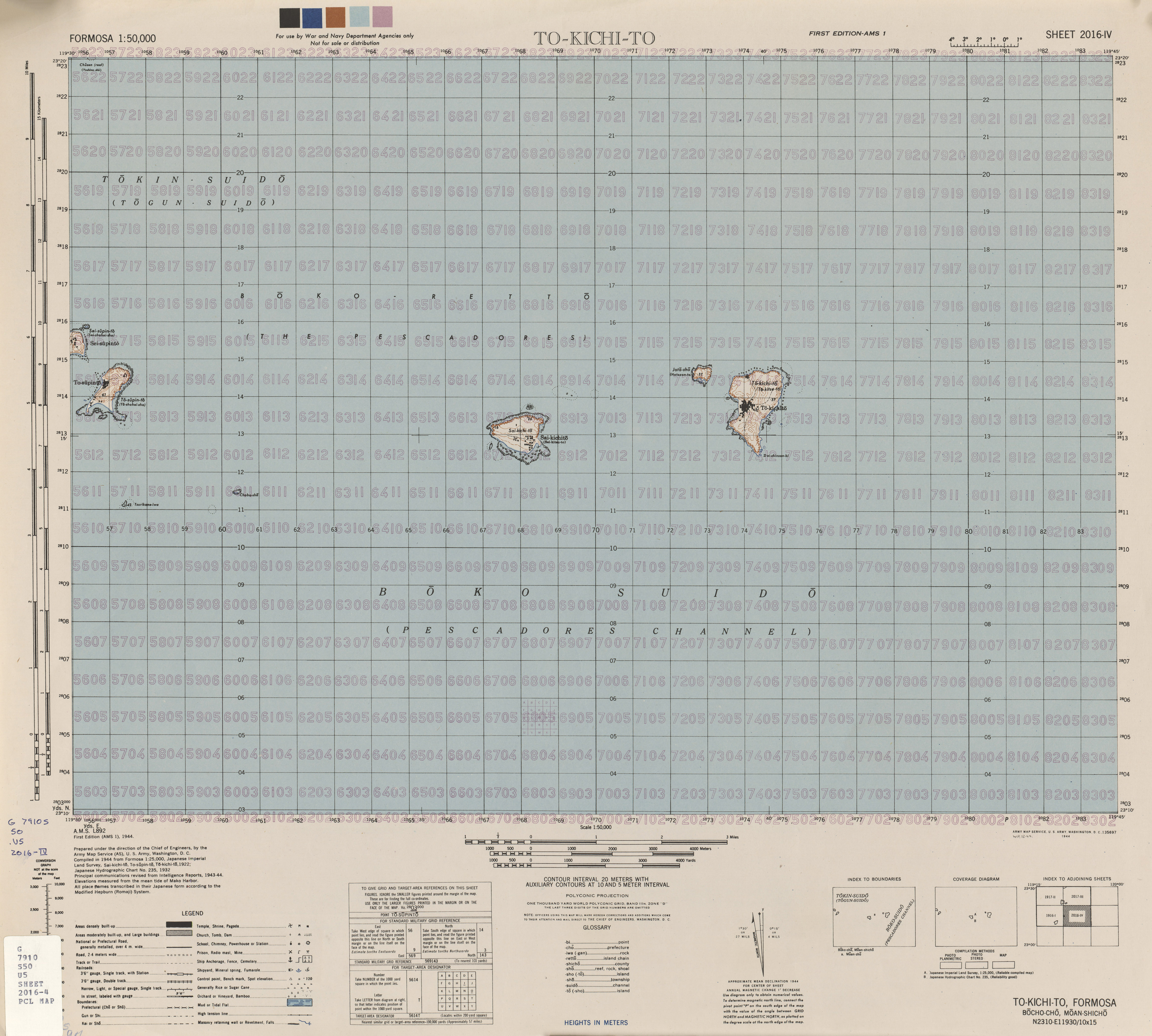
Map of Dongji Island (labeled as Tō-kichi-tō (Tō-kitsu-tō)) and surrounding area (1944)

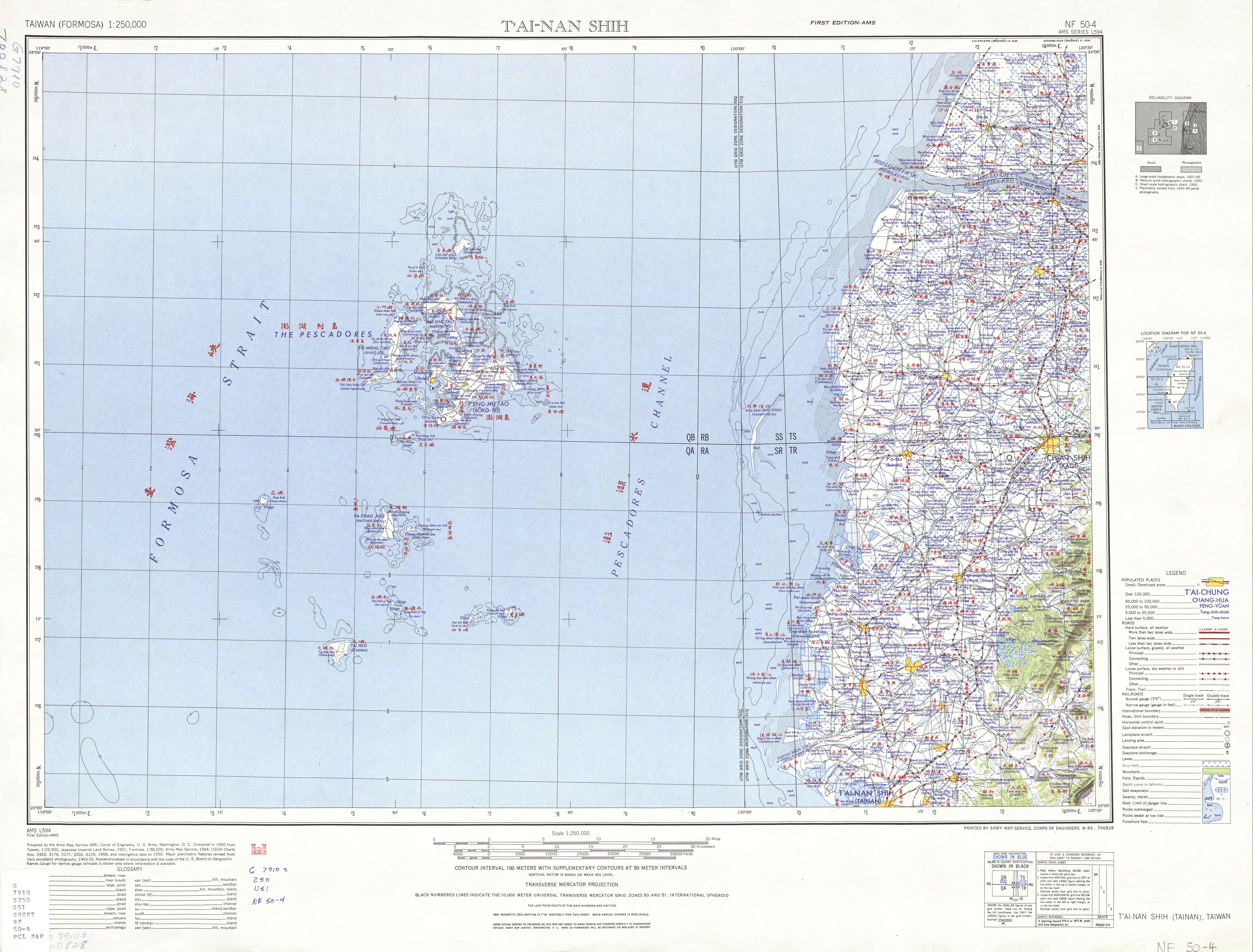
Map including Dongji Island (labeled as Tung-chi hsü (Tō-kichi-sho) 東吉嶼) (1950)

A temple for Wang Ye worship on the island was built during the Jiaqing era and restored in 1872.

Dongji Island Lighthouse was built in 1911 during the period of Japanese rule of Taiwan.

In June 2012, fisherman Wang Chiu-tang (王秋堂) discovered a fossilized ivory tusk in a trench near the island 200 m (660 ft) below sea level.

In June 2014, Dongji Island was made part of the new South Penghu Marine National Park.

In May 2016, a ferry service between Tainan and Dongji Island had its maiden voyage. The trip to Tainan takes about two and a half hours.

On July 1, 2016, the Hsiung Feng III missile mishap occurred in the waters southeast of Dongji Island.

In June 2017, a tornado-like twister was reported in the waters off Dongji Island, which is an occasional occurrence in the area's weather patterns.

On January 10, 2018, the Chia Ming Lun (嘉明輪) cargo ship ran aground and sank near Dongji Island. The ship and its cargo was left unsalvaged.

On October 4, 2019, over 800 kg (1,800 lb) of abandoned fishing nets were removed from coral reef near Dongji Island.

== Geography ==
Dongji Island's village is located near the middle of the island in an area that was previously underwater. There are two mountains on the island- in the north is Hutoushan (虎頭山), in the south is Baguashan (八卦山). The smaller formerly inhabited Chutou Islet (Jotō-shō, Hotozan-to; 鋤頭嶼) is located to the immediate northwest of Dongji Island.

The marine area of Taijiang National Park covers a band extending 20 metres (66 ft) from the shore of Taiwan Island and 54 km (34 mi) long from Yanshui River to Dongji Island, an area of 344.05 km^{2} (132.84 mi^{2}).

== Climate ==
Dongji Island has a tropical climate close to the humid subtropical boundary. Being an offshore island in the shallow Taiwan Strait, the location has lower diurnal temperature variation than either mainland Taiwan or the Asian continental landmass to its west. The island is also a lot drier and sunnier than the Taiwanese mainland. The vast majority of rain falls in summer as the East Asian monsoon penetrates the high-pressure systems otherwise dominating the area. Winters are dry with comfortable weather for outdoor activities, although cloudier than the low rainfall amounts would suggest.

Climate data for Dongji Island (Dongjidao) (1991–2020 normals, extremes 1962–present）
Month	Jan	Feb	Mar	Apr	May	Jun	Jul	Aug	Sep	Oct	Nov	Dec	Year
Record high °C (°F)	28.1 (82.6)	28.7 (83.7)	31.2 (88.2)	32.1 (89.8)	36.9 (98.4)	35.2 (95.4)	35.7 (96.3)	35.3 (95.5)	34.3 (93.7)	34.2 (93.6)	31.0 (87.8)	29.6 (85.3)	36.9 (98.4)
Mean daily maximum °C (°F)	20.0 (68.0)	20.6 (69.1)	23.2 (73.8)	26.1 (79.0)	28.5 (83.3)	29.9 (85.8)	31.0 (87.8)	30.8 (87.4)	30.0 (86.0)	27.7 (81.9)	25.1 (77.2)	21.7 (71.1)	26.2 (79.2)
Daily mean °C (°F)	18.1 (64.6)	18.5 (65.3)	20.7 (69.3)	23.6 (74.5)	26.0 (78.8)	27.8 (82.0)	28.7 (83.7)	28.4 (83.1)	27.6 (81.7)	25.5 (77.9)	23.1 (73.6)	19.9 (67.8)	24.0 (75.2)
Mean daily minimum °C (°F)	16.7 (62.1)	16.9 (62.4)	18.9 (66.0)	21.9 (71.4)	24.4 (75.9)	26.2 (79.2)	26.9 (80.4)	26.6 (79.9)	26.0 (78.8)	24.3 (75.7)	21.8 (71.2)	18.6 (65.5)	22.4 (72.3)
Record low °C (°F)	8.0 (46.4)	8.4 (47.1)	8.8 (47.8)	11.2 (52.2)	17.2 (63.0)	19.6 (67.3)	21.4 (70.5)	21.4 (70.5)	19.6 (67.3)	16.4 (61.5)	14.0 (57.2)	9.2 (48.6)	8.0 (46.4)
Average precipitation mm (inches)	21.8 (0.86)	28.9 (1.14)	38.4 (1.51)	70.8 (2.79)	117.3 (4.62)	183.9 (7.24)	189.9 (7.48)	243.3 (9.58)	108.2 (4.26)	35.6 (1.40)	32.9 (1.30)	26.1 (1.03)	1,097.1 (43.21)
Average precipitation days (≥ 0.1 mm)	4.2	4.0	4.9	6.8	7.9	9.8	9.2	10.0	5.6	1.8	2.6	2.6	69.4
Average relative humidity (%)	78.0	79.4	78.7	80.0	81.8	83.9	82.1	83.3	81.0	77.2	77.3	76.7	80.0
Mean monthly sunshine hours	119.0	110.7	149.2	171.5	202.4	215.3	259.8	232.4	229.4	214.5	149.6	121.1	2,174.9
Source: Central Weather Bureau

== Gallery ==
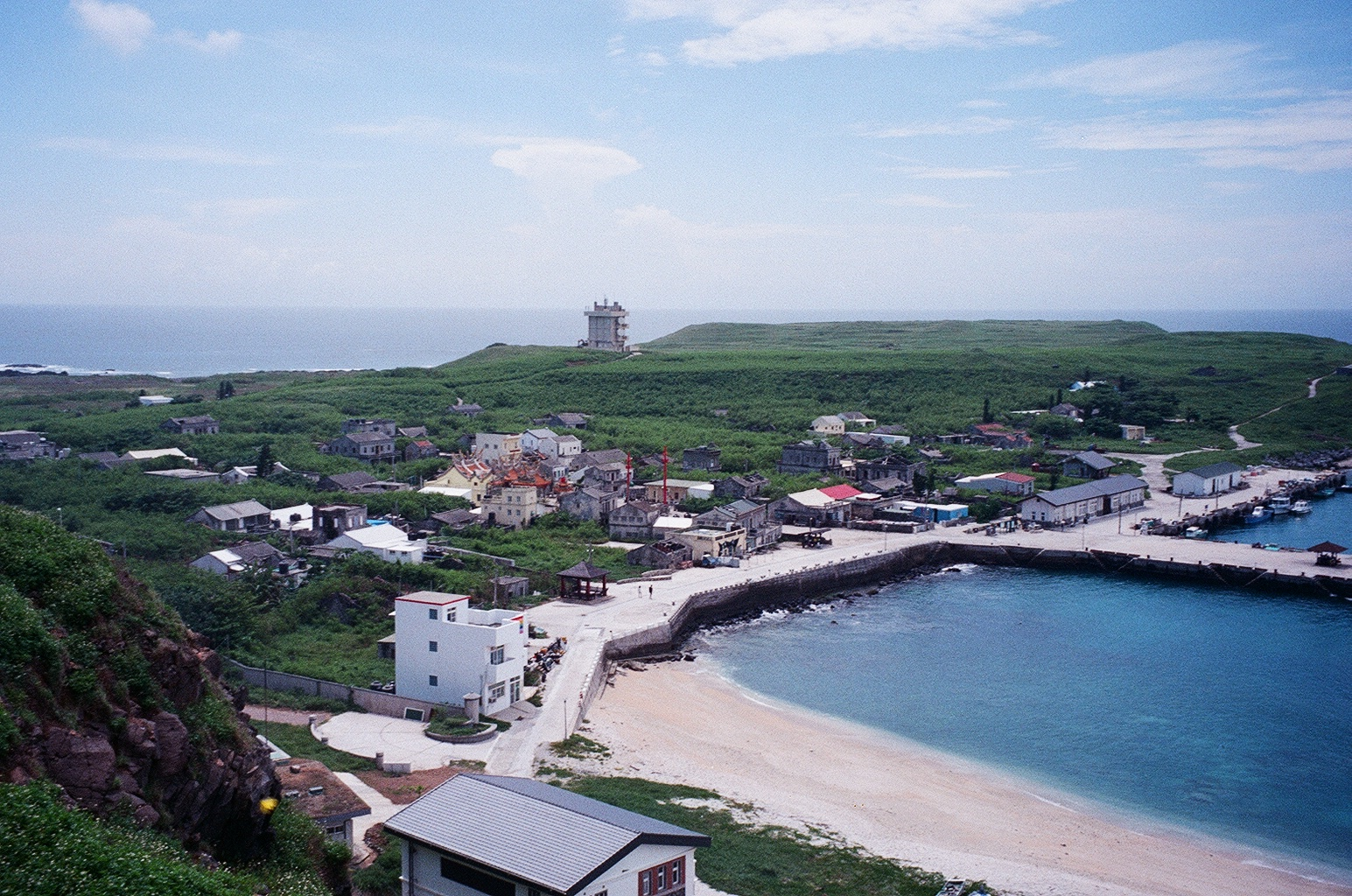
Dongji Fishing Harbor

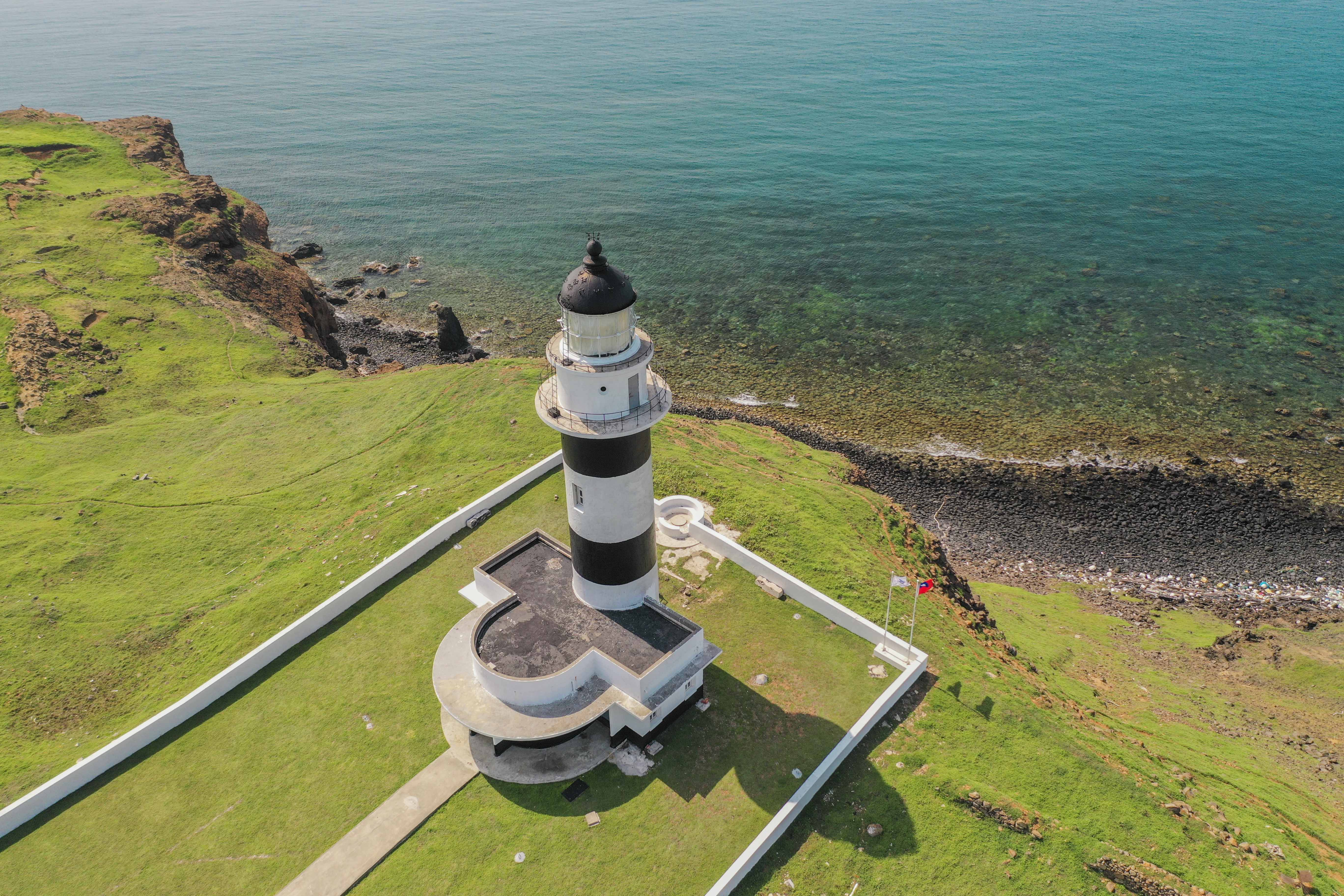
Dongji Island Lighthouse

== See also ==
- List of islands of Taiwan
