= Andrews and Wilson =

American authors

- Born: Brian Drake Andrews; Jeffrey Allen Wilson; December 7, 1982 (age 43); Boston, Massachusetts, U.S.
- Occupation: Writers
- Writing career
- Genres: Thriller, war fiction
- Notable works: Tier One; Sons of Valor; Dark Intercept; Tom Clancy: Act of Defiance
- Website: andrews-wilson.com

Brian Drake Andrews and Jeffrey Allen Wilson (born December 7, 1982), collectively known as Andrews and Wilson, are American authors. They are known for the Tier One, Sons of Valor, and Shepherds series of novels, as well as the Jack Ryan novels, which are part of the Ryanverse featuring characters created by Tom Clancy.

== Early life ==
Andrews graduated from Vanderbilt University with a bachelor's degree in psychology. He also graduated from Cornell University with a master's degree in business. Wilson graduated from College of William & Mary in 1988 with a degree in biology.

== Career ==
Andrews and Wilson both served in the U.S. Navy, with the former working as a submarine officer and the latter also serving as a combat surgeon for the Navy SEALs. Andrews later became a nuclear engineer, while Wilson worked as a vascular and trauma surgeon.

Andrews and Wilson were first known for the Tier One series of military thriller novels. In 2020, Andrews and Wilson debuted a Tier One spin-off series titled Sons of Valor. In 2024, Legendary Entertainment acquired film and TV rights to the series.

In 2020, Andrews and Wilson signed a three-book deal with Christian publisher Tyndale House. They introduced the faith-based Shepherds series with the novel Dark Intercept, released in 2021. They later signed a new book deal with Blackstone Publishing in 2024 to continue the series. In 2025, they announced their own imprint, Andrews and Wilson Entertainment, within Blackstone Publishing.

=== Tom Clancy universe ===
In 2023, Andrews and Wilson were announced as writers of the Jack Ryan series, succeeding Marc Cameron. Speaking about their approach to the franchise, the authors said: "Some people consider the thriller genre mindless escapism, but we have a very different take. For us, storytelling is something we take very seriously—we view it as a professional opportunity to highlight the integrity, courage, and professionalism of the men and women in the military and intelligence communities who tirelessly serve this great nation without ever asking for anything in return." Clancy's longtime editor Tom Colgan released a statement: "We're extremely excited to welcome Andrews & Wilson to the Clancy team. As Navy veterans themselves, they will bring the authenticity and creativity that Clancy readers demand to the Jack Ryan series."

Their first entry in the series, Tom Clancy: Act of Defiance, was published in May 2024. It was followed by Tom Clancy: Defense Protocol in December of the same year. In 2025, Andrews and Wilson announced their decision to exit the series and also announced their final entry, Tom Clancy: Executive Power, which was published in November 2025.

== Bibliography ==
=== Tier One series ===
- Tier One (2016)
- War Shadows (2017)
- Crusader One (2017)
- American Operator (2018)
- Red Specter (2019)
- Scars (Tier One Origins novella) (2020)
- Collateral (2020)
- Dempsey (2023)
- Ember (2024)
- The Adversary (2025)
- Insurgent (2026)

=== Sons of Valor series ===
- Sons of Valor (2021)
- Violence of Action (2022)
- War Machine (2023)
- False Flag (2025)

=== The Shepherds series ===
- Dark Intercept (2021)
- Dark Angel (2022)
- Dark Fall (2022)
- Dark Rising (2025)

=== Jack Ryan series ===
Featuring characters created by Tom Clancy

- Tom Clancy: Act of Defiance (2024)
- Tom Clancy: Defense Protocol (2024)
- Tom Clancy: Executive Power (2025)

=== Nick Foley series (as Alex Ryan) ===
- Beijing Red (2016)
- Hong Kong Black (2017)

=== Presidential Agent series ===
Featuring characters created by W. E. B. Griffin

- Rogue Asset (2021)

=== Standalone ===
- The Sandbox (2023)
- Four Minutes (2024)

=== Short stories ===
- "First Ranger" (2025)
- "Sledgehammer" (2026)
- "The Equestrian" (2026)
- "Minotaur" (2026)
- "Portal" (2026)
- "Angel Heist" (2026)
- "Fire House" (2026)
- "Snapback" (2026)

=== Brian Andrews solo work ===
==== Think Tank series ====
- The Calypso Directive (2012)
- The Infiltration Game (2016)

==== Standalone ====
- Ring of Flowers (novella) (2012)
- "Black Sundown" (short story) (2016)
- Reset (2018)

=== Jeffrey Wilson solo work ===
- The Traiteur's Ring (2010)
- The Donors (2012)
- Fade to Black (2013)
- The Dark Heart: A Bounty Hunter Tale (2014)
- War Torn (2018)
- Julian's Numbers (2024)
