= Executive Power (Andrews and Wilson novel) =

2025 novel by Andrews and Wilson

- Authors: Brian Andrews; Jeffrey Wilson
- Audio read by: Scott Brick
- Language: English
- Series: Jack Ryan
- Release number: 26
- Genre: Techno-thriller; Military fiction; Realistic fiction
- Publisher: G.P. Putnam's Sons
- Publication date: November 25, 2025
- Publication place: United States
- Media type: Print (Hardcover), Audio, eBook
- Pages: 464
- ISBN: 9780593718063
- Preceded by: Defense Protocol
- Followed by: Rules of Engagement

Executive Power (stylized as Tom Clancy Executive Power or Tom Clancy: Executive Power) is a techno-thriller novel, written by Brian Andrews and Jeffrey Wilson and published on November 25, 2025. It is their third and final book in the Jack Ryan series, which is part of Ryanverse featuring characters created by Tom Clancy.

In the novel, President Ryan must deal with the disappearance of his son Kyle during a coup in Angola.

== Plot summary ==
Defense Intelligence Agency (DIA) officer Kyle Ryan, U.S. president Jack Ryan's youngest son, sets up a covert communications and surveillance network near the Chinese embassy in Luanda, Angola. He survives an assassination attempt by a hit squad who kills his colleagues, and seeks refuge at the U.S. embassy.

The incident leads President Ryan to reposition the USS Kearsarge amphibious ready group (ARG) near the coast of Luanda, unaware that his son had transferred from the U.S. Navy to work for the DIA in Angola. An intelligence task force led by Office of Naval Intelligence (ONI) analyst Katie Ryan, Kyle's sister, is also deployed aboard Kearsarge.

Meanwhile, Patriotic Front for Unity (PFU) leader Victor Baptista carries out a coup to oust Angolan president Francisco Luemba. He orders his men to attack the U.S. embassy during a protest, taking Kyle, ambassador Patricia Gonçalves, her executive assistant, and a DSS officer as hostages and moving them to an undisclosed location. At the same time, General João de Souza of the Angolan Armed Forces arrests Luemba, vice president Rosine de Carvalho, and the cabinet. Taking over the presidential palace at Luanda, Baptista tries to seek Chinese support for the coup and frame Luemba for conspiring with radical elements in the PFU to attack the embassy.

After finding out about his son's disappearance, President Ryan orders the 22nd Marine Expeditionary Unit (MEU) from the Kearsarge on an amphibious assault to secure the embassy. Katie joins the Marines at the embassy and works on tracking down Kyle and the hostages, who were last seen at the Bairro Cazenga district where the PFU had safe houses and a network of tunnels. Two teams of Marine Raiders infiltrate the neighborhood and breach the tunnels, but fail to find the hostages.

The local Chinese intelligence (MSS) station in Luanda withdraws their support for Baptista after learning that Kyle is one of the hostages, just as the PFU terrorists move them to the presidential palace. President Ryan orders the 22nd MEU to surround the palace and orders the Marine Raiders to extract Luemba from prison. Kyle is brought to a video conference between President Ryan, Baptista, and General de Souza. Baptista is killed by a Marine sniper outside the palace as the hostages are rescued.

== Characters ==
=== Washington, D.C. ===
- Jack Ryan: President of the United States
- Arnold "Arnie" van Damm: White House chief of staff
- Mary Pat Foley: Director of national intelligence
- Scott Adler: Secretary of state
- Robert Burgess: Secretary of defense
- Admiral Lawrence Kent, USN: Chairman of the Joint Chiefs of Staff
- Major General Bruce Kudryk, U.S. Army: Joint Chiefs of Staff
- Dr. Cathy Ryan: First Lady of the United States
- Dr. Sally Ryan Kartal: Ophthalmic surgeon
- Commander Dennis Knepper, USN: Executive officer

=== Luanda, Angola ===
- Kyle Ryan: Defense Intelligence Agency
- Patricia Gonçalves: Ambassador to Angola
- Madison Bennett: Executive assistant to the ambassador
- Julio Tejada: Regional Security Officer (RSO)
- Freddy Vincent: CIA chief of station
- Lieutenant Commander Katie Ryan: Office of Naval Intelligence
- Intelligence Specialist Second Class "Bubba" Pettigrew: Office of Naval Intelligence
- Lieutenant Junior Grade John Conza: Office of Naval Intelligence
- Captain Anthony Miles, USN: Commanding USS Kearsarge
- Colonel Ricardo "Rick" Crocker: 22nd Marine Expeditionary Unit commander
- Major Merriweather, USMC: 1st Company commander
- Captain Nick Camperos, USMC: Alpha team leader
- Captain Josh Dane, USMC: Charlie team leader
- Francisco Luemba: president of Angola
- Victor Baptista: Patriotic Front for Unity (PFU) leader
- General João de Souza: Chief of the general staff of the Angolan Armed Forces

== Reception ==
=== Commercial ===
Executive Power did not chart on the New York Times bestseller list in its initial release, the third time for a Jack Ryan novel since The Hunt for Red October in 1984 and Command and Control in 2023.

=== Critical ===
Kirkus Reviews reviewed the book: "This novel looks like Katie and Kyle’s debuts as central characters, and they are Ryans through and through—they run toward trouble, and they have no faults worth mentioning. Parental and filial loyalty mix well with the action and add interest to an otherwise standard (but good) Clancy thriller." In their review, Red Carpet Crash added: "Fans of the series will enjoy this action-packed novel."
