= Wangan, Penghu =

Rural township in Penghu, Taiwan

Wangan 望安 Wang-an, Wang'an, Pa Chao
- Rural township
- Wangan Township · 望安鄉
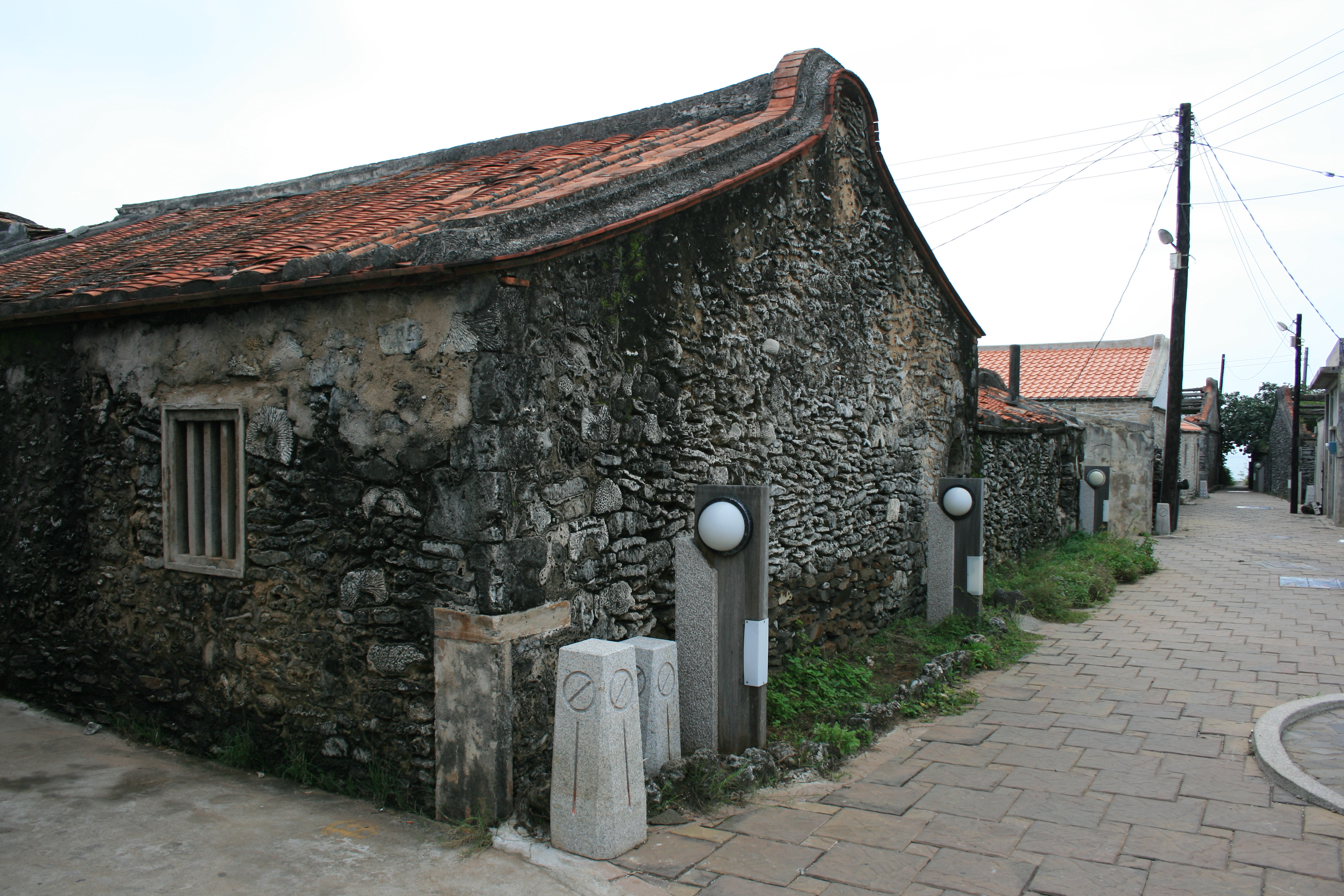

- Wangan Township Hall Penghu County

- Wangan Township in Penghu County

- Location in the Republic of China (Taiwan)
- Coordinates: 23°21′25.4″N 119°30′1.2″E
- Country: Republic of China (Taiwan)
- County: (Penghu County) Penghu
- Rural villages (村): 9

Government
  - Chief Executive (鄉長): Peng Ya-Hu (彭亞湖)

Area
  - Total: 13.7824 km^{2} (5.3214 sq mi)

Population (March 2023)
  - Total: 5,435
  - Density: 394.3/km^{2} (1,021/sq mi)
- Time zone: UTC+8 (National Standard Time)
- Postal code: 882
- Website: www.wangan.gov.tw/en (in English)

Wangan Township
- Traditional Chinese: 望安鄉
Transcriptions
Standard Mandarin
- Hanyu Pinyin: Wàng-an Xiang
- Bopomofo: ㄨㄤˋ ㄢ ㄒㄧㄤ
- IPA: [wâŋ.án ɕiáŋ]
Southern Min
- Hokkien POJ: Bāng-oaⁿ-hiong
- Tâi-lô: Bāng-uann-hiong

Wangan Township / Wang-an Township (Chinese: 望安鄉; pinyin: Wàng'ān Xiāng; Pe̍h-ōe-jī: Bāng-oaⁿ-hiong) is a rural township in Penghu County (the Pescadores), Taiwan. It is the second smallest township in Penghu County after Cimei Township. The township is made up of nineteen islands, six of which are inhabited.

== Name ==
The main island is Wangan Island, originally known as Bazhao / Pa Chao (八罩).

== Geography ==
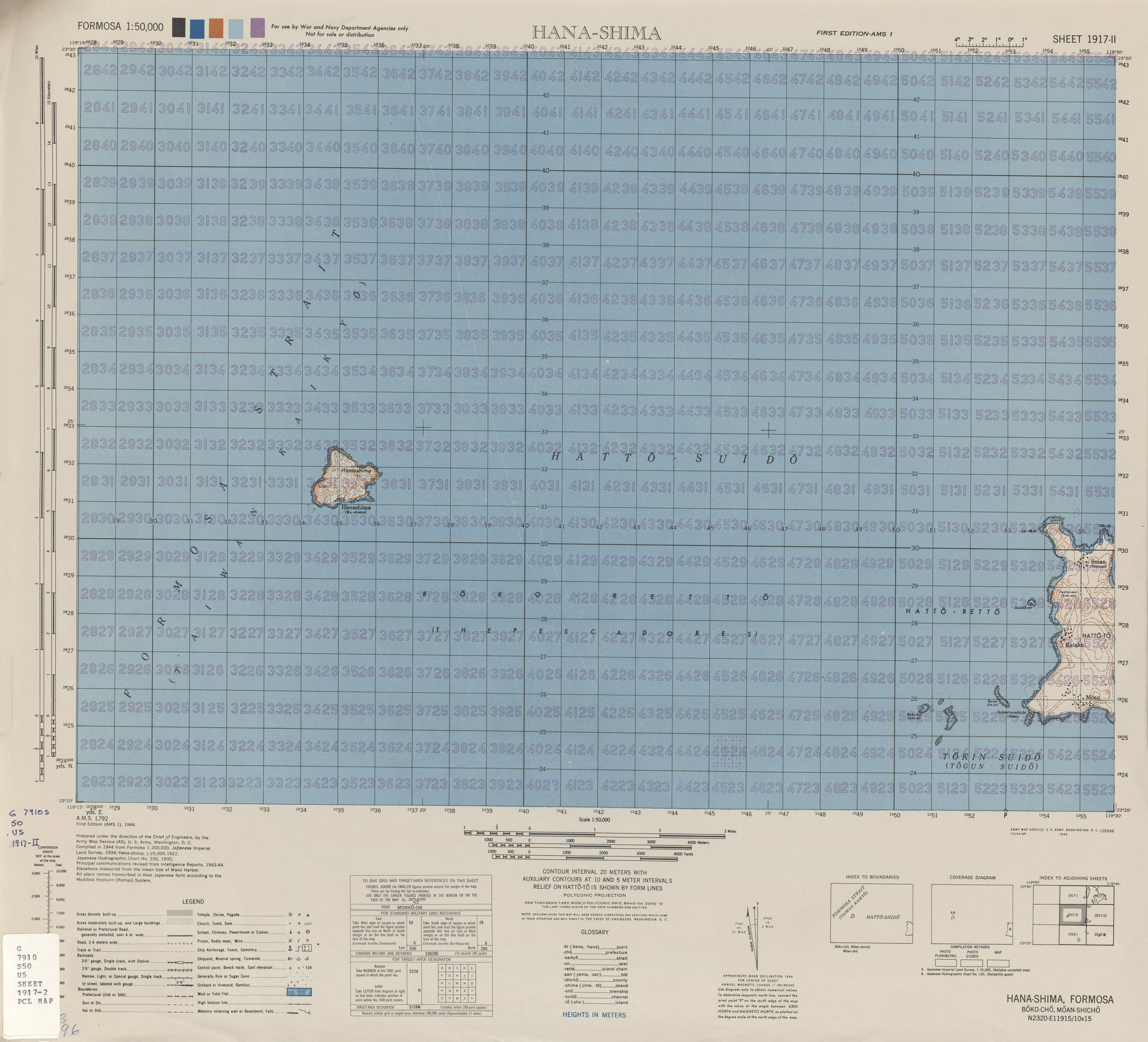
Map of part of Wangan (labeled as HATTŌ-TŌ) (1944)

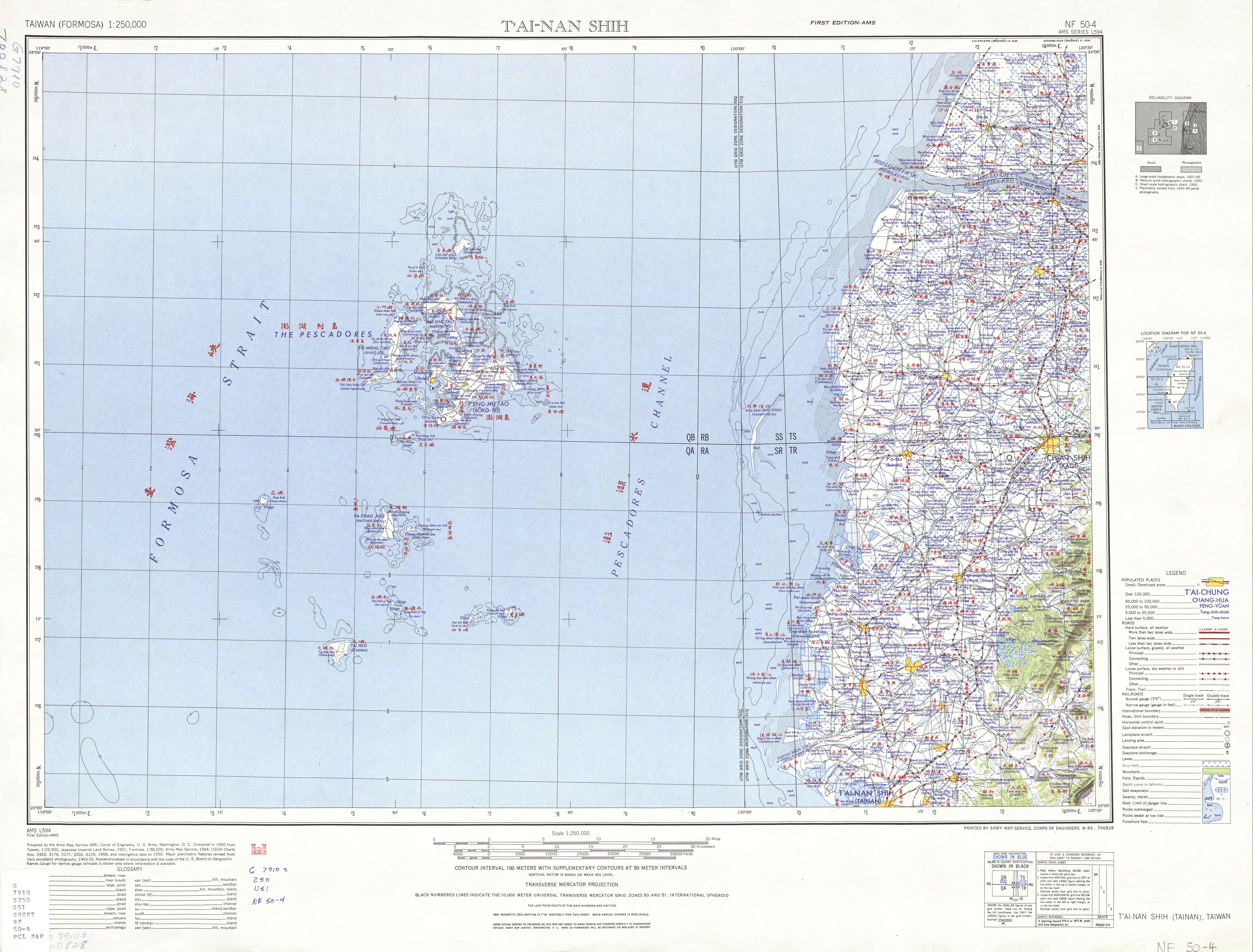
Map including Wangan (labeled as PA-CHAO HSÜ (HATTAKU-SHO) 八罩嶼) (1950)

The township is located in the southern sea of Penghu. Islands in the township include:

- Wangan Island (望安島; Bāng-an-tó)
- Jiangjyunao Islet (Chiang-chün-ao hsü, Shōgunō-sho; 將軍澳嶼; Tsiong-kun-ò-sū)
- Hua Islet (Hua hsü, Hana-shima; 花嶼; Hue-sū)
- Mau Islets (貓嶼; Niau-sū)
- Cau Islet (草嶼; Tsháu-sū)
- Nan Un (南塭/南𥔋; Lâm-ùn)
- Maanshan Islet (馬鞍山嶼; Bé-uann-suann-sū)
- Chuanfan Reef (船帆礁; Tsûn-phâng-ta)
- Toujin (頭巾; Thâu-kun)
- West Islet (Hsi-hsü-p'ing, Sei-sūpin; 西嶼坪嶼; Sai-sū-phiânn-sū)
- East Islet (Tung-hsü-p'ing, Tō-sūpin; 東嶼坪嶼; Tang-sū-phiânn-sū)
- Siji Islet (Hsi-chi hsü, Saikichi-sho; 西吉嶼; Sai-kiat-sū)
- Dongji Island (Dongji Islet, Tung-chi hsü, Tō-kichi-sho; 東吉嶼; Tong-kiat-sū)
- Chutou Islet (鋤頭嶼; Tû-thâu-sū).

== Geology ==
The northern side of the main island has a higher average elevation than the southern side. It consists of wave-cut platforms along its coastline.

== Administrative divisions ==
There are nine villages on six of the nineteen islands, four of which are on the main island:

- Dongan/Dong-an/Tungan Village (東安村)
- Si-an/Xian Village (西安村)
- Jhongshe/Zhongshe Village (中社村)
- Shuei-an/Shuian Village (水垵村)
- Jiangjyun/Jiangjun Village (將軍村) on Jiangjyunao Islet (Chiang-chün-ao hsü, Shōgunō-sho; 將軍澳嶼)
- Dongji/Tungji Village (東吉村) on Dongji Island (Dongji Islet, Tung-chi hsü, Tō-kichi-sho; 東吉嶼)
- Dongping/Tungping Village (東坪村) on East Islet (Tung-hsü-p'ing, Tō-sūpin; 東嶼坪)
- Siping/Xiping Village (西坪村) on West Islet (Hsi-hsü-p'ing, Sei-sūpin; 西嶼坪)
- Huayu Village (花嶼村) on Hua Islet (花嶼)

== Tourist attractions ==
- Blue Cave
- Budai Port
- Jiangjyun Island
- Jongshe Historic House
- Mau Islet
- Mount Tiantai
- South Penghu Marine National Park
- Wangan Green Turtle Tourism and Conservation Center
- Yuanyang Caves

== Transportation ==
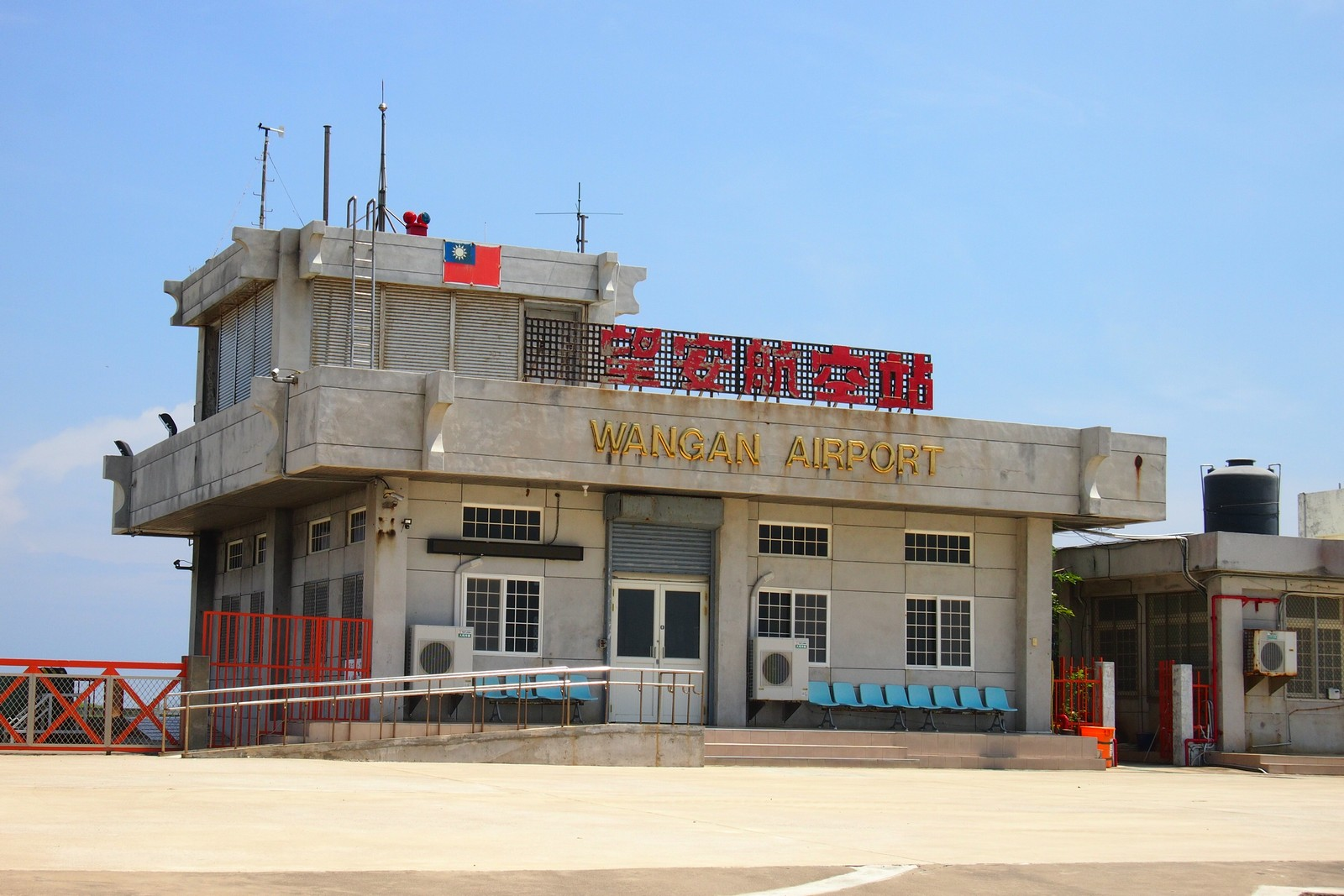
Wang-an Airport

Wang-an Airport offers flights to Kaohsiung. There are also ferries to Magong and other nearby islands from Tanmen Harbor.

== Education ==
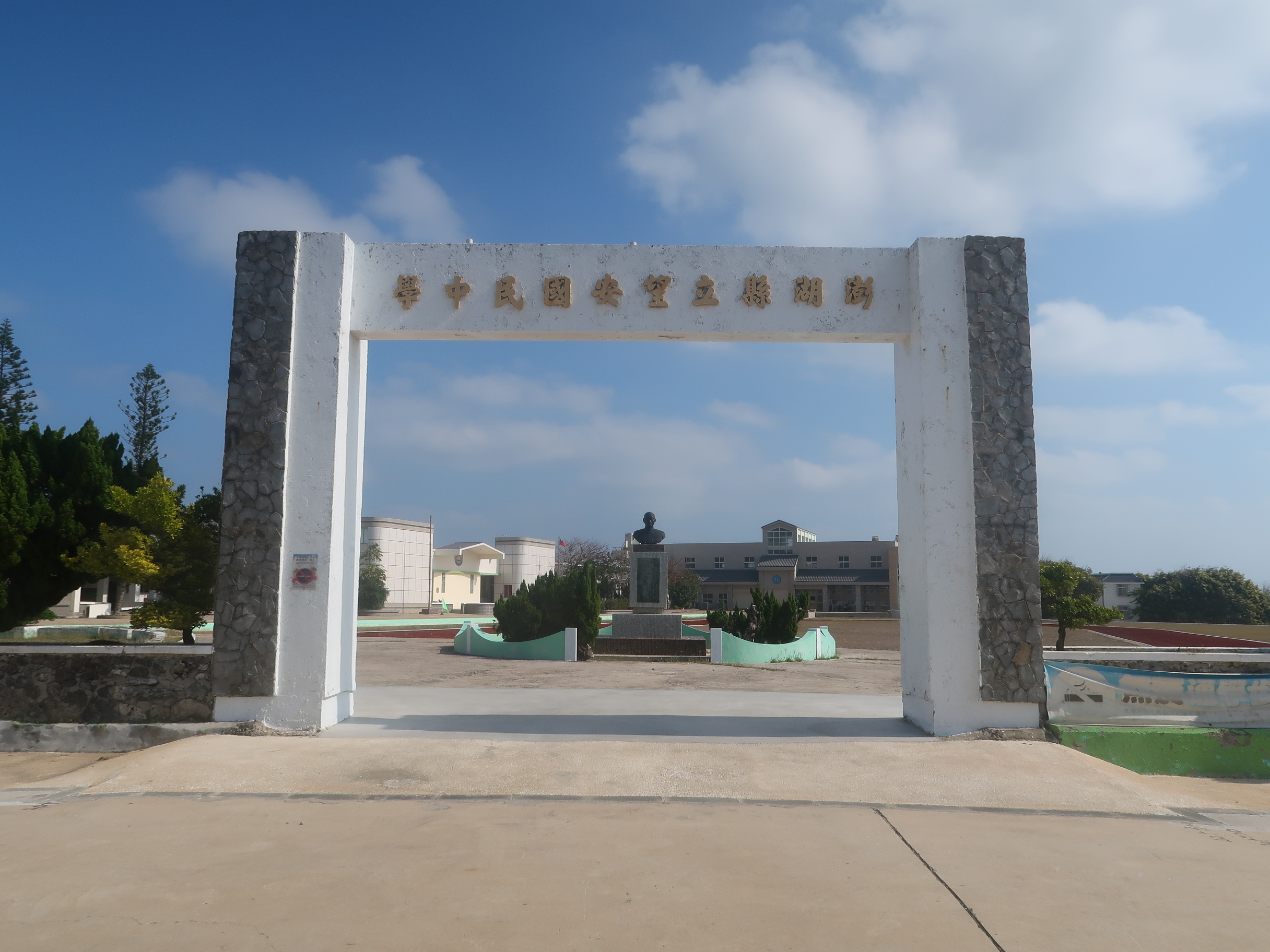
Wangan Junior High School (澎湖縣立望安國民中學)

There are four schools in Wangan, operated by the county government:

- Wangan Junior High School (澎湖縣立望安國民中學) - On Wangan Island
- Jiang Ao Junior High School (澎湖縣立將澳國民中學) - On Jiangjun'ao Island
- Wangan Primary School (澎湖縣立望安國民小學) - On Wangan Island
- Jiangjun Elementary School (澎湖縣望安鄉將軍國民小學) - On Jiangjun'ao Island
