= Hua Islet =

Islet west of Taiwan

Native name: 花嶼
- Hua Islet (dark red)

Geography
- Location: western Wangan Township, Penghu County (the Pescadores), Republic of China (Taiwan)
- Coordinates: 23.403362°N 119.322301°E
- Area: 1.2737 km^{2} (0.4918 sq mi)

Administration
- Republic of China (Taiwan)
- Province: Taiwan (streamlined)
- County: Penghu
- Rural Township: Wangan

Demographics
- Population: 339 (November 2017)
- Pop. density: 266.1537/km^{2} (689.3349/sq mi)

Additional information
- Time zone: National Standard Time (UTC+8)

Location of Hua Islet

Hua Islet (Chinese: 花嶼; Hanyu Pinyin: Huā Yǔ; Tongyong Pinyin: Hua Yǔ; Pe̍h-ōe-jī: Hoe-sū; lit. 'flower islet') is an islet in Huayu Village (花嶼村), Wangan Township, Penghu County (the Pescadores), Taiwan. Hua Islet is the westernmost point in Penghu (the Pescadores). The island has also been known as "West Islet" (西嶼). The Japanese-built Huayu Lighthouse (Hua Islet Lighthouse) is located on the southwestern hill of the island.

Ferries run periodically between Magong and Hua Islet as well as between Wangan Island and Hua Islet.

== History ==
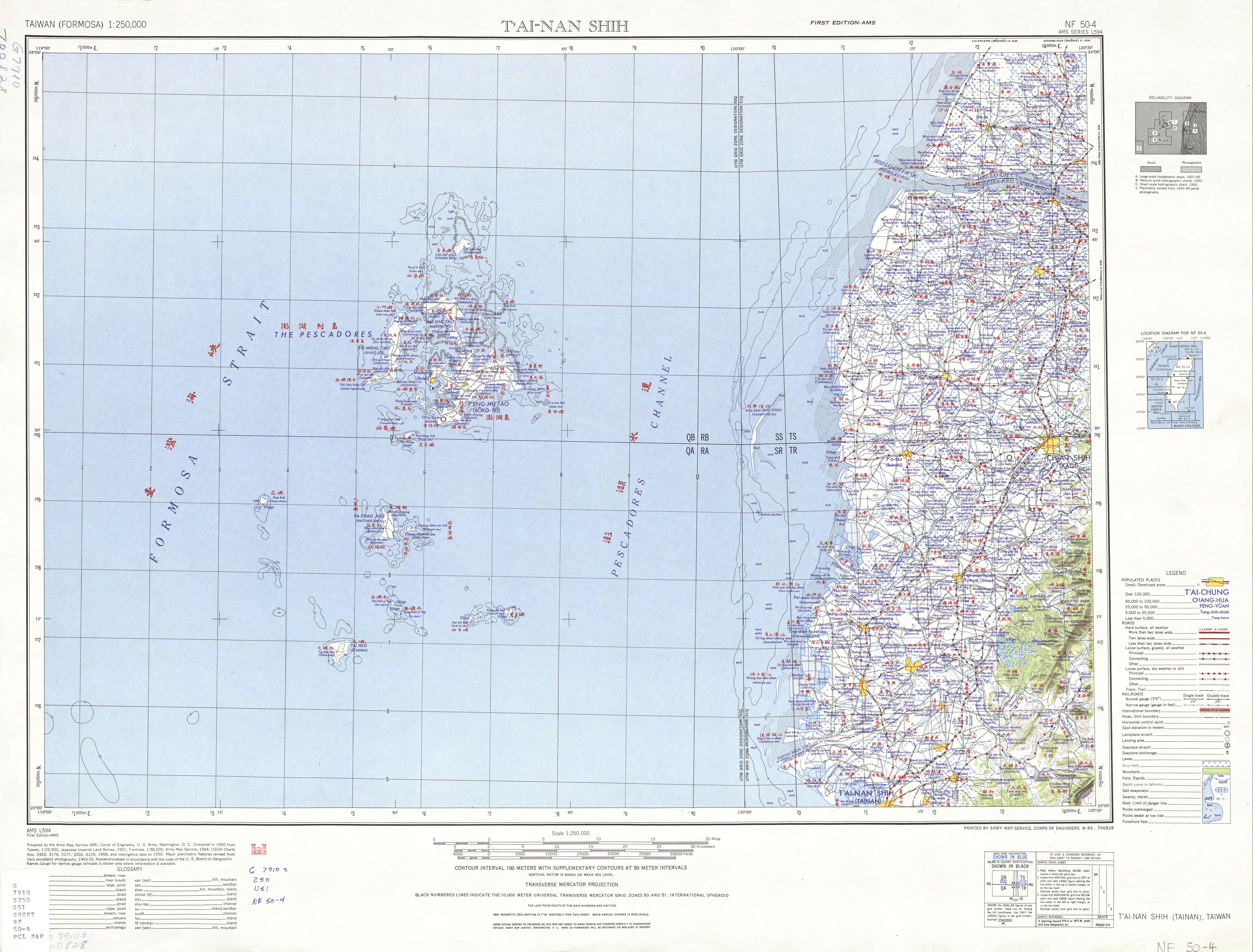
Map including Hua Islet (labeled as Hua hsü (Hana-shima) 花嶼) (1950)

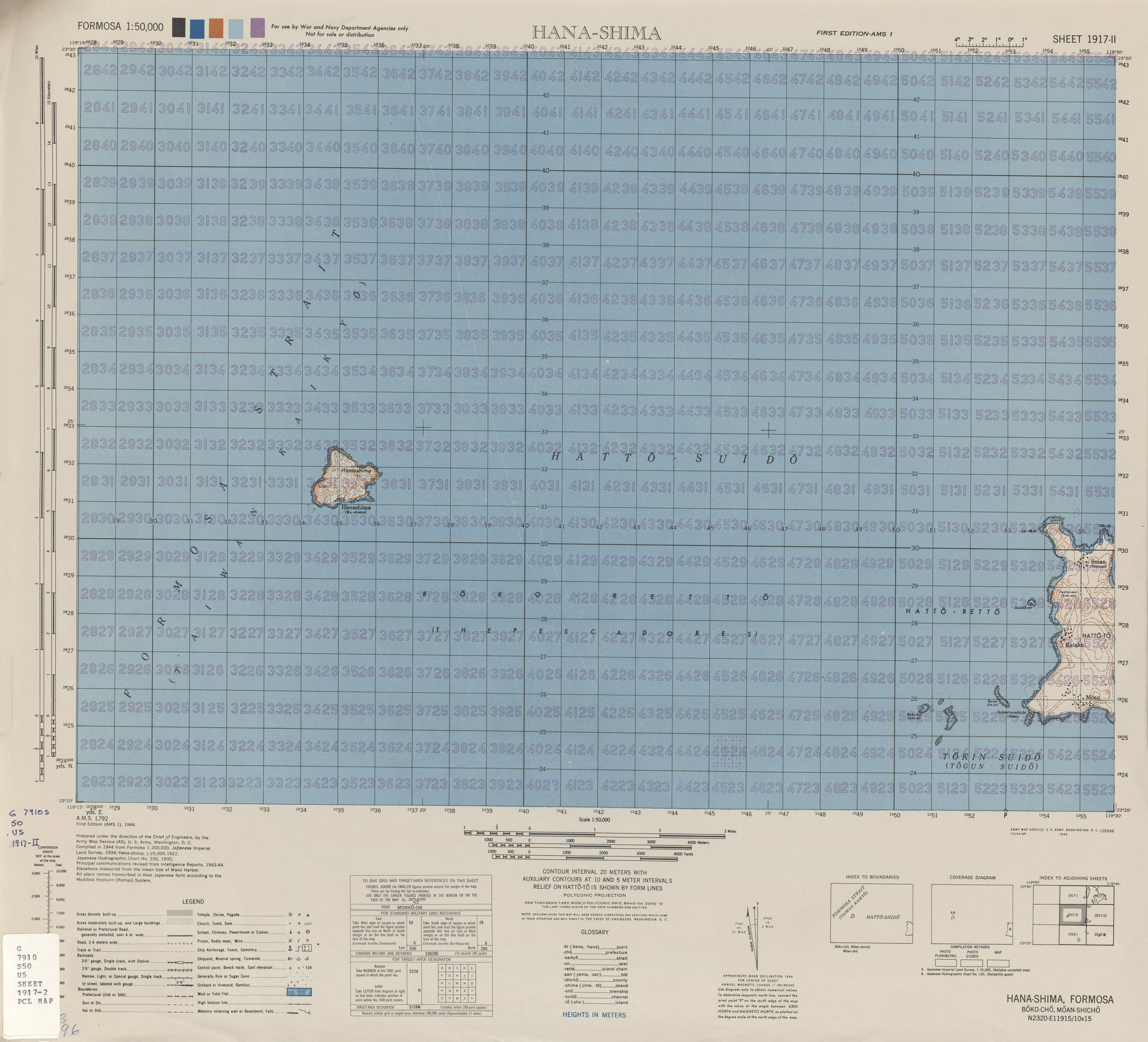
Map of Hua Islet (labeled as Hana-shima) and surrounding area (1944)

Huayu Lighthouse (Hua Islet Lighthouse) was built in 1939 as part of Japanese military planning for the area.

The handover of Taiwan to the Republic of China occurred in 1945. Huayu Village (花嶼村) was established in 1946.

Residents on the island originally used a deep well for water. Over time, the well has dried up and a seawater desalination plant was built in 2019. On August 11, 2019, the desalination plant failed, leading to complaints from the residents. The plant was restored to normal operation by August 20.

On the afternoon of October 5, 2019, an unnamed ship from China was caught violating Taiwanese waters 21 nmi (39 km) to the northwest of Hua Islet. The ship was boarded and the crew arrested.

== Geography ==
Hua Islet is the westernmost point in Penghu (the Pescadores), situated 18 km (11 mi) to the west-northwest of Wangan Island, 8 km (5.0 mi) to the north of the Mau Islets (Mao Islets; 貓嶼) and 8.5 km (5.3 mi) to the north of Cau Islet (Cao Islet; 草嶼).

The island is shaped like a triangle. The highest point on the island is 53 m (174 ft) above sea level.

The island is granitic making it geologically distinct from the other islands in Penghu (the Pescadores).

== See also ==
- List of islands of Taiwan

== Gallery ==
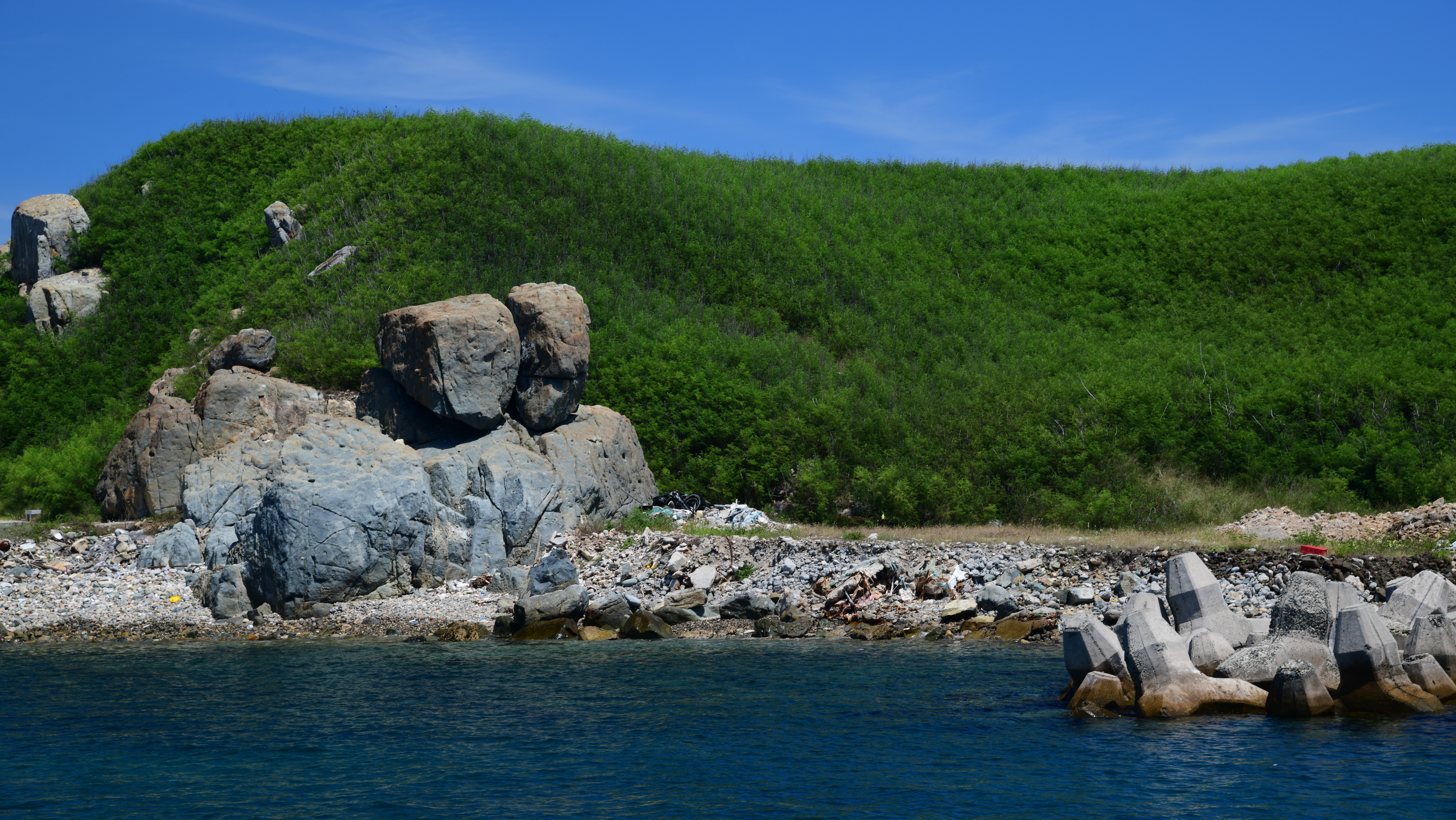
Couple Rock, in the Huayu harbor area.

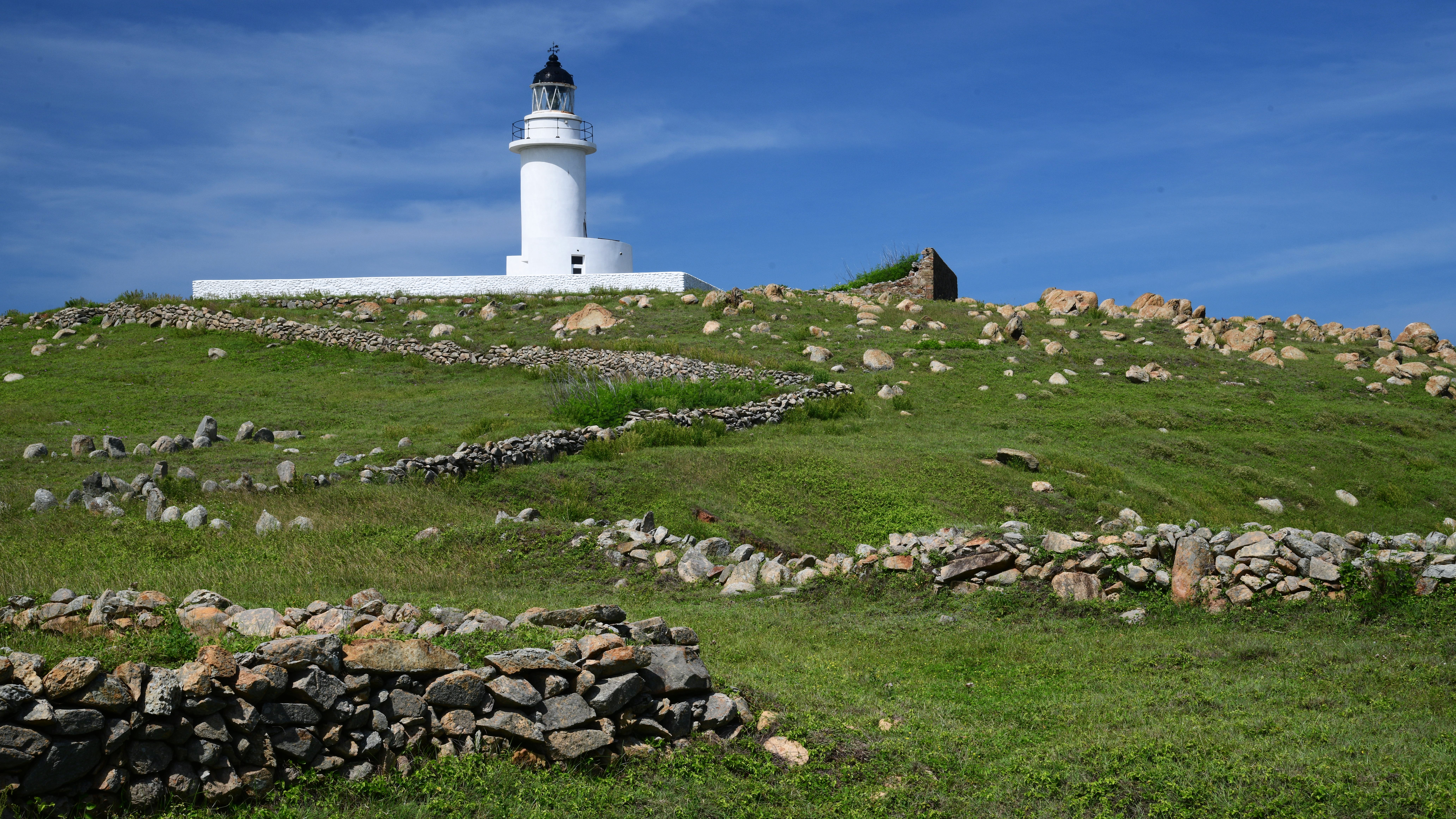
Huayu Lighthouse

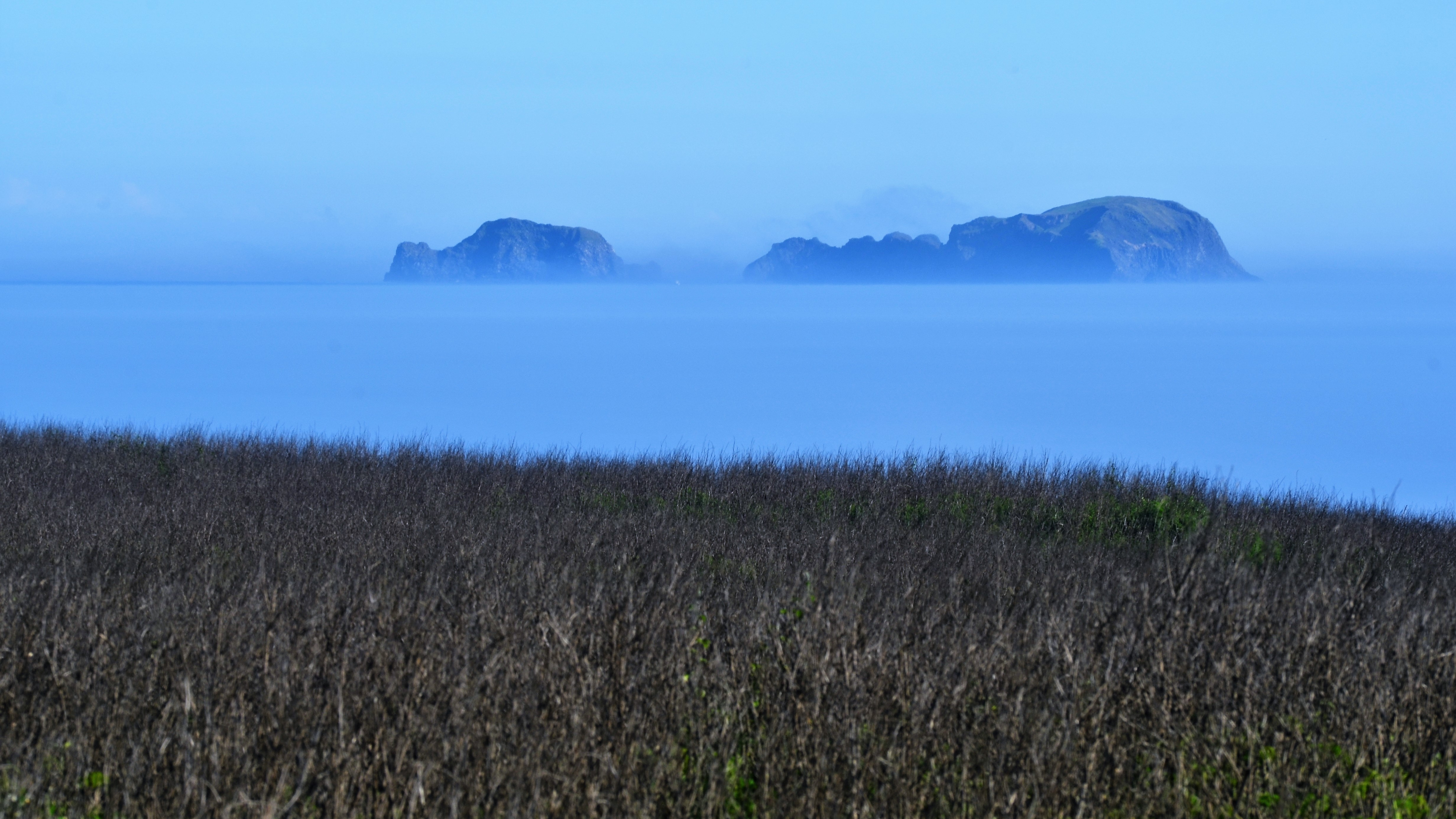
Mao islet (Cat islet), view taken from Huayu.

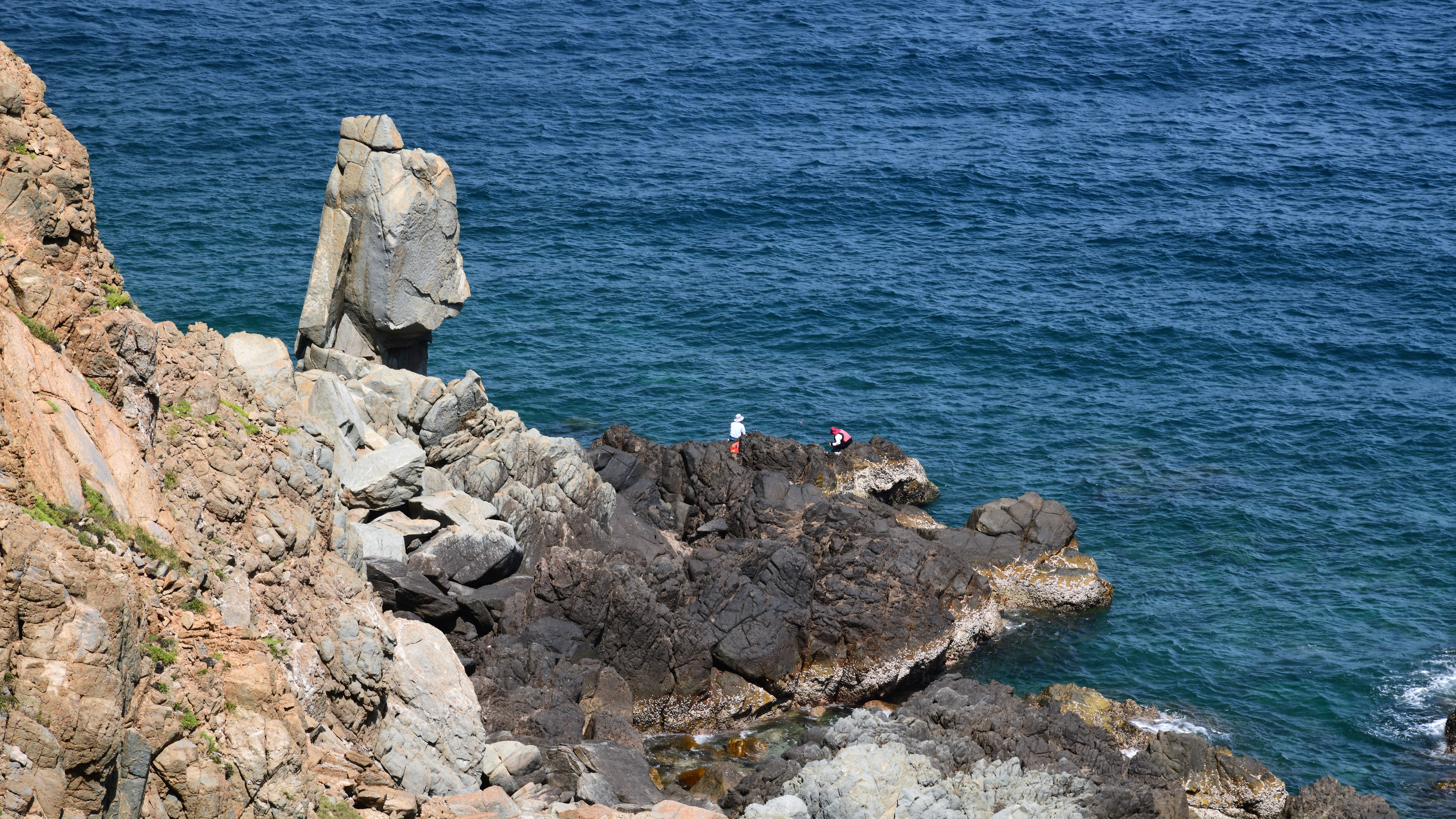
The Rock of Guanyin statue.
