= Net Force =

Net Force may refer to:

- Net force, the overall force acting on an object
- NetForce (film), a 1999 American television film
- Tom Clancy's Net Force, a novel series
- Tom Clancy's Net Force Explorers, a young adult novel series
