= Tom Clancy's Net Force Explorers: Private Lives =

Novel in the series Net Force Explorers

Net Force Explorers: Private Lives
- Author: Tom Clancy, Steve Pieczenik, Bill McCay
- Language: English
- Series: Tom Clancy's Net Force Explorers, #9
- Genre: Young Adult Fiction; Techno-thriller
- Publisher: Berkley Publishing Group
- Publication date: 2000
- Publication place: United States
- Media type: Print
- Pages: 181
- ISBN: 0747261709
- Preceded by: Shadow of Honor
- Followed by: Safe House

Private Lives is the ninth book in the young adult series Net Force Explorers created by Tom Clancy and Steve Pieczenik. The book was released in 2000 and ghost written by Bill McCay.

== Plot ==
The Net Force Explorer's mentor, Captain James Winter of the Net Force is put under investigation for a murder of a mobster. The younger team decide to take matters in their own handing believing him to have been framed. They do their own investigation, both in real life and in the virtual reality world in an attempt to clear his name. In time they realize the danger they are putting themselves in when other people connected to the case start to be murdered.
