= Tom Clancy's Net Force Explorers: The Deadliest Game =

Novel in the series Net Force Explorers

Net Force Explorers: The Deadliest Game
- Author: Tom Clancy, Steve Pieczenik, Diane Duane
- Language: English
- Series: Tom Clancy's Net Force Explorers, #2
- Genre: Young Adult Fiction; Techno-thriller
- Publisher: Berkley Publishing Group
- Publication date: 1998
- Publication place: United States
- Media type: Print
- Pages: 182
- ISBN: 0747260702
- Preceded by: Virtual Vandals
- Followed by: One Is The Loneliest Number

The Deadliest Game is the second book in the young adult series Net Force Explorers created by Tom Clancy and Steve Pieczenik. The book was released in 1998 and ghost written by Diane Duane.

== Plot ==
Net Force Explorers Megan O'Malley and Leif Anderson work to investigate an online Virtual Reality wargame.
