= Tom Clancy's Net Force Explorers: Virtual Vandals =

Novel in the series Net Force Explorers

Net Force Explorers: Virtual Vandals
- Author: Tom Clancy, Steve Pieczenik, Diane Duane
- Language: English
- Series: Tom Clancy's Net Force Explorers, #1
- Genre: Young Adult Fiction; Techno-thriller
- Publisher: Berkley Publishing Group
- Publication date: 1998
- Publication place: United States
- Media type: Print
- Pages: 181
- ISBN: 0747260710
- Followed by: The Deadliest Game

Virtual Vandals is the first book in the young adult series Net Force Explorers created by Tom Clancy and Steve Pieczenik. The book was released in 1998 and ghost written by Diane Duane.

== Plot ==
Set in 2025, Net Force Explorers member Matt Hunter witnesses an attack at a baseball game attended by fans in holographic form through virtual reality. The attack involved holographic bullets fired into the crowded that actually harmed the people that were simply attending through virtual reality. Matt learns that the attackers might be the same group that have been hacking computer systems and injuring people recently. Hunter and his Explorer friends sets out to stop them as he solves the crimes and leads to a confrontation with them in the real world.
