= Tom Clancy's Op-Center (novel) =

Book by Jeff Rovin

Op-Center
- First edition
- Author: Jeff Rovin (created by Tom Clancy & Steve Pieczenik)
- Language: English
- Series: Op-Center
- Genre: Geopolitical thriller
- Publisher: Berkley Books
- Publication date: February 1, 1995 (1st edition)
- Publication place: United States
- English publication date: February 1, 1995 (1st English language edition)
- Media type: Print (Hardback & Paperback) and audio
- Pages: 400 (US paperback edition)
- ISBN: 978-0-7862-0491-5 (US paperback edition)
- OCLC: 32465304
- Followed by: Mirror Image

Op-Center or Tom Clancy's Op-Center (1995) is the first novel in Tom Clancy's Op-Center created by Tom Clancy and Steve Pieczenik. It was written by Jeff Rovin. It was adapted into the film of the same name.

== Plot introduction ==
Renegade South Korean soldiers set off a bomb in Seoul during a festival and make it look like it was done by North Korea. Op-Center must prove that North Korea had nothing to do with it before the situation gets hostile. To make matters worse, a rogue general plans to launch some nuclear missiles at Tokyo, Japan intending to start a war against North Korea.

== Characters ==
- Paul Hood - Director of Op-Center.
- General Mike Rodgers - Deputy Director of Op-Center and commander of Op-Center's Military Branch, STRIKER. 2-Star General and who served in the Special Forces and Delta Force and a Vietnam War Veteran.
- Gregory Donald - Former US Ambassador to South Korea.
- Kim Hwan - Deputy Director of Korean Intelligence Agency.
- Major Lee - The Evil MasterMind.
- Av Lincoln - Secretary of State
- Ernesto Colon - Defense Secretary
- Melvin Parker - Chairman of the Joint Chiefs of Staff
- Greg Kidd - CIA Director
