= Tom Clancy's Net Force Explorers =

Young adult series created by Tom Clancy and Steve Pieczenik

Tom Clancy's Net Force Explorers or Net Force Explorers is a series of young adult novels created by Tom Clancy and Steve Pieczenik as a spin-off of the military fiction series Tom Clancy's Net Force. The first novel was published in 1998. In 2025, the Internet and its virtual reality network have to be policed by the Net Force to prevent cyber-terrorists from sabotaging it. They are assisted by the Net Force Explorers, a young people's auxiliary for computer experts who have completed a rigorous training program.

== Characters ==
The explorers include Maj (Madeline) Green, David Gray, Matt Hunter, Mark Gridley, Leif Anderson, Andy Moore, Megan O'Malley, Catie, and Charlie Davis, and are led by former Marine commander Captain James Winters. The young people solve cyber-crimes and defeat international terrorists while creating virtual worlds and playing high-tech computer games.

== Novels ==
While Clancy and Pieczenik are credited as the creators of the series, they didn't write any of the books. Their names would be the ones you saw on the cover, but the co-authors name's in the cover's fine print. Some frequent authors were Diane Duane, Bill McCay, and Mel Odom.

#	Title	Author
1	Virtual Vandals	Diane Duane
2	The Deadliest Game	Diane Duane
3	One is the Loneliest Number	Diane Duane
4	The Ultimate Escape	Mark Cerashi
5	The Great Race	Bill McCay
6	End Game	Diane Duane
7	Cyberspy	Bill McCay
8	Shadow of Honor	Mel Odom
9	Private Lives	Bill McCay
10	Safe House	Diane Duane
11	Gameprey	Mel Odom
12	Duel Identity	Bill McCay
13	Deathworld	Diane Duane
14	High Wire	Mel Odom
15	Cold Case	Bill McCay
16	Runaways	Diane Duane
17	Cloak and Dagger	John Helfers and Russel Davis
18	Death Match a.k.a. Own Goal	Diane Duane

== See also ==
NetForce (film)
