= Jeff Rovin =

American novelist

- Occupations: Novelist; columnist; magazine editor; freelance writer; consultant
- Children: 2 (Michael & Sam)
- Writing career
- Pen name: Jim Grand, Harry Bergen, Jeffrey and Lila Dubinsky
- Genres: Horror, fantasy, science fiction, supernatural

Jeff Rovin is an American magazine editor, freelance writer, columnist, and author, who has appeared on The New York Times Best Seller list.

== Biography ==
Jeff Rovin has been editor-in-chief of Weekly World News, an assistant editor and writer for DC Comics, and an editor for Warren Publishing and Seaboard Periodicals, as well as a science and media columnist in such magazines as Analog, Omni, and Famous Monsters of Filmland.

His How to Play video game books of the 1980s and 1990s detailed strategies for dozens of games for the Nintendo Entertainment System, Sega Genesis, and Game Boy. This series was preceded by his The Complete Guide to Conquering Video Games in 1982, and followed by his Gamemaster series that lasted until the late 1990s, which began containing a violence rating for the games included in these books. Rovin's publisher at the time, St. Martin's, later decided to continue the "How To Win At", series, but this time written by Hank Schlesinger, to cover Nintendo 64, PlayStation games, and Pokémon.

Rovin has written encyclopedias about popular culture, including The Encyclopedia of Superheroes (Facts On File, 1985), The Encyclopedia of Super Villains (Facts On File, 1987) The Illustrated Encyclopedia of Cartoon Animals (Prentice Hall, 1991), and The Encyclopedia of Monsters (Checkmark Books, 1990). He has worked on biographical and film books on such performers as Kelsey Grammer, Lana Turner, Adam West, Ellen DeGeneres, Jackie Chan, Charlton Heston, Elvis Presley, Sylvester Stallone, Richard Pryor, Luke Perry, Jason Priestley, and Julio Iglesias, and on the animated series The Simpsons. Additionally, he has written quiz and joke books.

Rovin's novels are in the fields of thriller, horror, adventure, and mystery, in addition to the military field with books in the Force Five and Tom Clancy's Op-Center series. His Tom Clancy's Op-Center: War of Eagles became a New York Times Best Seller.

His later Unit Omega books were written under the name pen name Jim Grand. He then began writing further military suspense novels under his own name, such as Tempest Down, Dead Rising, and Rogue Angel.

In October 2016, during the last days of the Donald Trump campaign, Rovin appeared on Hannity, in Breitbart News and the front cover of National Enquirer, claiming to have been a "fixer" for Bill Clinton and Hillary Clinton, hiding family scandals. His allegations included that Hillary Clinton was "bisexual" and a "secret sex freak" with an "open marriage" and had a romantic relationship with Vince Foster.

== Bibliography ==
=== Fiction ===
==== Stand-alone novels ====
- The Hindenburg Disaster (1975)
- The Transgalactic Guide To Solar System M-17 (1981)
- The Madjan (1984)
- Dagger (1988)
- Starik (1989) – with Sander Diamond
- The Red Arrow (1990) – with Sander Diamond
- Cat Angels (1995)
- Vespers (1999) – based on his screenplay of the same name.
- Stealth War (2000)
- Fatalis (2000) – based on his screenplay of the same name.
- Dead Rising (2005)
- Tempest Down (2007)
- Rogue Angel (2007)
- The Devil's Rangers (2007) – written under the pen name Jim Grand
- Conversations with the Devil (2013)
- Coldwater (2015)
- Zero-G (2016) – with William Shatner

==== Hollywood Detective ====
1. Garrison (1975)
2. The Wolf (1975)

==== Novelizations and tie-ins ====
- April Fool's Day (1986)
- Re-Animator (1987)
- Cliffhanger (1993)
- Mortal Kombat (1995) – original novel based on the video game
- Broken Arrow (1996)
- The Game (1997)
- Return of the Wolf Man (1998) – original novel based on the Universal Monsters

==== Force Five ====
1. Destination: Algiers (1989)
2. Destination: Stalingrad (1989)
3. Destination: Norway (1989)

==== Tom Clancy's Op-Center ====
Series created by Tom Clancy and Steve Pieczenik

1. Op-Center (1995)
2. Mirror Image (1995)
3. Games of State (1996)
4. Acts of War (1997)
5. Balance of Power (1998)
6. State of Siege (1999)
7. Divide and Conquer (2000)
8. Line of Control (2001)
9. Mission of Honor (2002)
10. Sea of Fire (2003)
11. Call to Treason (2004)
12. War of Eagles (2005)
17. For Honor (2018)
18. Sting of the Wasp (2019)
19. God of War (2020)
20. The Black Order (2021)
21. Call of Duty (2022)

==== Unit Omega ====
written under the pen name Jim Grand

1. Unit Omega (2003)
2. Operation Medusa (2004)

==== The EarthEnd Saga ====
Co-written with actress Gillian Anderson

1. A Vision of Fire (2014)
2. A Dream of Ice (2015)
3. The Sound of Seas (2016)

=== Nonfiction ===
- Of Mice and Mickey (1975)
- A Pictorial History of Science Fiction Films (1976)
- From Jules Verne to Star Trek (1977)
- The Fabulous Fantasy Films (1977)
- Mars! (1978)
- The Fantasy Almanac (1979)
- The Signet Book of Movie Lists (1979)
- The Science Fiction Collector's Catalog (1982)
- TV Babylon (1984)
- The Encyclopedia of Superheroes (1985)
- The Encyclopedia of Super Villains (1987)
- The Encyclopedia of Monsters (1990)
- The Spirits of America (1990)
- The Illustrated Encyclopedia of Cartoon Animals (1991)
- Laws of Order: A Book of Hierarchies, Rankings, Infrastructures, Measurements, and Sizes (1992)
- The Laserdisc Film Guide: Complete Ratings for the Best and Worst Movies Available on Disc (1993)
- Adventure Heroes: Legendary Characters from Odysseus to James Bond (1995)
- The Book of Dumb Movie Blurbs (1996)
- Aliens, Robots, and Spaceships (1996)
- The Book of Dinosaurs
- The Book of TV Lists
- Country Music Babylon
- Did You Ever Wonder; Why Do Cowboys Wear High Heels?; Who Put Boys in Blue and Girls in Pink?; Are Bats Really Blind?
- Fascinating Facts from the Bible
- From the Land Beyond Beyond
- The Great Television Series
- Movie Special Effects
- The Second Book of Movie Lists
- Simpson Fever!
- Sports Babylon, (With Steve Burkow)
- TV Babylon 2
- The Unbelievable Truth
- What's the Difference?; A Compendium of Commonly Confused and Misused Words

==== Biographies ====
- From the Land Beyond Beyond: The films of Willis O'Brien and Ray Harryhausen (1977)
- The Films of Charlton Heston (1977)
- Always, Lana (1982) – with Taylor Pero
- Richard Pryor, Black and Blue (1984)
- Joan Collins: The Unauthorized Biography (1984)
- Julio! (1985)
- Stallone!: A Hero's Story An Unauthorized Biography (1987)
- Luke-Mania! Jason-Fever! (1991)
- The World According to Elvis (1992)
- Back to the Batcave (1994) – with Adam West
- Ellen DeGeneres Up Close: The Unauthorized Biography of the Hot New Star of ABC's Ellen (1994) – with Kathy Tracy
- The Essential Jackie Chan (1997) – with Kathy Tracy

==== Humor and trivia ====
- In Search of Trivia (1984)
- 1,001 Great One-Liners (1989)
- 500 Hilarious Jokes for Kids (1990)
- The First Good News/Bad News Joke Book (1993)
- 500 Great Doctor Jokes
- 500 Great Lawyer Jokes
- 500 More Hilarious Jokes for Kids
- 1,001 Great Jokes
- 1,001 More Great Jokes
- 1,001 Great Pet Jokes
- 1,001 Great Sports Jokes
- Dinomite Dinousaur Jokes
- Don't Even Think About Telling this Joke at Work (writing as Harry Bergen)
- Don't Even Think About Telling this Joke to a Lawyer (writing as Harry Bergen)
- Goldie's Lox and the Three Bagels (writing as Jeffrey and Lila Dubinsky)
- Mother Gooseberg's Book of Jewish Nursery Rhymes (writing as Jeffrey and Lila Dubinsky)
- The Second Good News/Bad News Joke Book
- Winning at Trivial Pursuit
- Count Dracula's Vampire Quiz Book
- The Supernatural Movie Quizbook
- The Superhero Movie and TV Quiz Book
- The UFO Movie Quizbook
- The Unauthorized Teenage Mutant Ninja Turtles Quiz Book

==== Video game books ====
- The Complete Guide to Conquering Video Games: How to Win Every Game in the Galaxy (1982)
- How to Win at Nintendo (1988)
- How to Win at Nintendo Games 2 (1989)
- How to Win at Nintendo Games 3 (1990)
- How to Win at Nintendo Sports Games (1990)
- How to Win at Super Mario Bros. Games (1990)
- How to Win at Sega & Genesis Games (1991)
- How to Win at Game Boy Games (1991)
- How to Win at Super Nintendo Entertainment System Games (1992)
- The Best of How to Win at Nintendo Games (1993)
- Gamemaster: Conquering Super Nintendo Games (1994)
- Gamemaster: Conquering Sega Genesis Games (1994)
- Gamemaster: The Complete Video Game Guide 1995 (1994)
- How to Win at Nintendo Games #4
