= Tom Clancy's Op-Center: Mirror Image =

1995 novel by Jeff Rovin

- First edition
- Author: Jeff Rovin (created by Tom Clancy & Steve Pieczenik)
- Language: English
- Series: Tom Clancy's Op-Center
- Genre: Techno-thriller
- Publisher: Berkley Books
- Publication date: November 1, 1995
- Publication place: United States
- Media type: Print (Hardback & Paperback) and audio
- Pages: 436 (US paperback edition)
- ISBN: 978-0-425-15014-6 (US paperback edition)
- OCLC: 33182367
- Preceded by: Tom Clancy's Op-Center
- Followed by: Games of State

Tom Clancy's Op-Center: Mirror Image (also called Op-Center: Mirror Image) is the second novel in Tom Clancy's Op-Center created by Tom Clancy and Steve Pieczenik first published in 1995. The actual novels are written by Jeff Rovin.

== Plot ==
The Cold War is over. And chaos is setting in. The new president of Russia is trying to create a democratic regime. But there are strong elements within the country that are trying to stop him: the ruthless Russian mafia, the right-wing nationalists, and those nefarious forces that will do whatever it takes to return Russia to the days of the Czar.

Op-Center, the newly founded but highly successful crisis management team, begins a race against the clock and against the hardliners. Their task is made even more difficult by the discovery of a Russian counterpart... but this one's controlled by those same repressive hardliners and represents the opposite of everything Op-Center stands for. Two rival Op-Centers, virtual mirror images of each other. But if this mirror cracks, it'll be more than seven years of bad luck.
