= One is the Loneliest Number (disambiguation) =

One Is the Loneliest Number redirects to the song "One" by Harry Nilsson.

One is the Loneliest Number may also refer to:

- "One is the Loneliest Number", an episode of Holby City
- "One is the Loneliest Number", an episode of The Zula Patrol
- One Is The Loneliest Number, a novel in the literary series Tom Clancy's Net Force Explorers

== See also ==
- One Is a Lonely Number
