= Tom Clancy's Op-Center =

American novel series since 1995

Tom Clancy's Op-Center is a novel series, created by Tom Clancy and Steve Pieczenik, though the first 12 books were written by Jeff Rovin between 1995 and 2005. It was later rebooted in 2014, with subsequent books written by Dick Couch, George Galdorisi, and Rovin.

== Main characters ==
These characters are in most or all stories from the main series:

- Paul Hood: The Director of Op-Center and former Mayor of L.A.
- General Mike Rodgers: Deputy Director of Op-Center and STRIKER Commander
- Bob Herbert: Chief of Intelligence
- Matt Stoll: In-house computer genius
- Darrel McCaskey: The FBI Liaison
- Lowell Coffey II: Op-Center's lawyer
- Liz Gordon: Op-Center's psychologist

These characters are in the stories from the reboot series:

- Chase Williams: The Director of Op-Center and a former U.S. Naval Admiral
- Aaron Bleich: Geek Programmer and Data Analyst
- Roger McCord: Intelligence Director
- Brian Dawson: Operations Director
- Jim Wright: Domestic Crisis Manager
- Richard Middleton: Planning Director
- Hector Rodriquez: JSOC Liaison, Retired Army Sergeant Major
- Sandee Barron: Helicopter Pilot
- Mike Volner: JSOC Response Team Commander
- Allen Kim: FBI CIRG Team Leader

== List of Op-Center Novels ==
The books in the Tom Clancy's Op-Center series:

#	Title	Publication date	ISBN	Authors	Plot
1	Tom Clancy's Op-Center	1995	978-0786204915	Jeff Rovin	Op-Center deals with anti-unification terrorists in Korea trying to provoke a new war with North Korea.
2	Mirror Image	1995	978-0425150146	Jeff Rovin	A hardline coalition in the Russian government plots against the new president of Russia, backed by the Russian equivalent of Op-Center.
3	Games of State	1996	978-0425151877	Jeff Rovin	A millionaire funds Neo-Nazi activity in Europe, while plotting to insert subliminal messages of hate into the mass media.
4	Acts of War	1997	978-0425156018	Jeff Rovin	Syrian Kurdish terrorists plotting a political assassination take hostages from the Regional Op-Center: employees testing a prototype mobile surveillance post.
5	Balance of Power	1998	978-0425165560	Jeff Rovin	The murder of an Op-Center representative (Martha Mackall) leads to a faction trying to provoke a Spanish Civil War.
6	State of Siege	1999	978-0425168226	Jeff Rovin	Rogue soldiers seize the UN complex in New York and demand a hefty ransom for the release of their diplomatic hostages (including Hood's daughter, Harleigh). Now it's personal, and Hood has returned to Op-Center to save his daughter.
7	Divide and Conquer	2000	978-0425174807	Jeff Rovin	Op-Center seeks the help of their Russian counterpart in tracking the legendary assassin, The Harpooner. Meanwhile, Paul Hood is called in when it appears the President might be undergoing a mental breakdown.
8	Line of Control	2001	978-0425180051	Jeff Rovin	The Striker Team, cut off and without support, has to fend for their survival on the line of demarcation between India and Pakistan.
9	Mission of Honor	2002	978-0425186701	Jeff Rovin	Op-Center has to work with the Vatican and Spanish Special Forces when an African rebel group takes hostages at several missions.
10	Sea of Fire	2003	978-0425190913	Jeff Rovin	High traces of radiation found on a corpse, leads to a company selling nuclear waste to terrorists.
11	Call to Treason	2004	978-0425195468	Jeff Rovin	When Mike Rodgers is fired due to budget cuts, he goes to work for a corrupt senator and gets embroiled in the vicious world of Washington politics.
12	War of Eagles	2005	978-0425199626	Jeff Rovin	Op-Center is under new management as Paul Hood is reassigned to a Pennsylvania Ave. appointment. At the same time, bombings in Charleston, Durban, and Taiwan, may signify the outing of a feud within the Chinese government.
13	Out of the Ashes	2014	978-1250026835	Dick Couch and George Galdorisi	When terrorists blow up NFL stadiums across the country, the President of the United States charters a new Op-Center for the 21st Century. Admiral Chase Williams is the new director, (Paul Hood at this time is diagnosed with ALS) and must also stop another plot involving a renegade Saudi prince from manipulating America into attacking Syria and launching a war against Iran.
14	Into the Fire	2015	978-0593072479	Dick Couch and George Galdorisi	A high-ranking North Korean general is murdered and a U.S. Navy ship is attacked and grounded during a training exercise. Op-Center discovers a secret alliance between China and North Korea, and must quickly rescue the crew in time as well as stop a North Korean terrorist cell from being unleashed upon the American homeland in order to prevent the outbreak of World War III.
15	Scorched Earth	2016	978-1250026873	George Galdorisi	U.S. General Bob Underwood, Presidential Envoy to the Global Coalition to Defeat ISIL is kidnapped in Syria and brutally murdered on live television. When the U.S. retaliates with a massive attack, the ISIS leader's son is killed in an American bombing raid. His rage knowing no bounds, he is now determined to wreak vengeance on the American homeland itself. Op-Center must assemble both its domestic, as well as its international force to stop his deadly quest for revenge.
16	Dark Zone	2017	978-1250026897	Jeff Rovin and George Galdorisi	Former US Ambassador to Ukraine Douglas Flannery meets with an old friend and former spy who is seeking his help to thwart a Russian plan to overrun her native Ukraine. However, moments after the meeting, she is killed. Within hours, Op-Center learns of the killing and must use cutting-edge techniques of cyber warfare and spycraft to uncover the truth before a more dangerous scheme is revealed, one that could draw in NATO and Russian forces into Ukraine and ignite World War III.
17	For Honor	2018	978-1250183019	Jeff Rovin	In 1962, during the height of the Cuban Missile Crisis, the Soviet Union secretly constructed a nuclear missile silo in a remote Russian fishing village not far from Alaska. More than sixty years later, Iranian scientists team up with a Russian agent and his estranged, arms-smuggling father to bring those missiles to Tehran. Upon learning of these actions, Op-Center sends a lone agent to Havana to determine the location of the site, whilst simultaneously weighing whether or not to rely on data from an Iranian defector. Complicating matters is a turf war between Op Center, the White House and the FBI that threatens to compromise the investigation.
18	Sting of the Wasp	2019	978-1250183026	Jeff Rovin	When a terrorist attack occurs at the Air and Space Museum on the USS Intrepid in Manhattan, the White House orders Op-Center disbanded―or so it seems. Director Chase Williams is authorized to establish a new mobile strike force within Op-Center, known as BLACK WASP. They are tasked with finding the mastermind behind the attack, Iranian Captain Ahmed Salehi. However, as their investigation continues, they learn Salehi is part of a larger plot by a renegade Iranian tycoon determined to establish a new Islamic State that will dwarf the horrors of ISIS.
19	God of War	2020	978-1250209252	Jeff Rovin	A series of separate incidents, including the downing of an aircraft en route to Australia, an explosion of a luxury yacht in the South Indian Sea, and a helicopter crash in South Africa have one variable in common: all were victims of a devastating bio-terror event. In response to the outbreak, China deploys a naval flotilla to investigate the source of the virus and weaponize it, while Russia embarks on its own agenda to seize the plague as a means to rebuild its superpower status. Director Chase Williams and his BLACK WASP team must find out who is behind these deadly attacks before a war is unleashed―and millions of innocent lives are lost.
20	The Black Order	2021	978-1250222343	Jeff Rovin	A group of self-proclaimed patriots and survivalists calling themselves the Black Order conduct a savage war against the US government; specifically the left-leaning cultural and progressive forces threatening their values and beliefs. Composed of military veterans and technology specialists, the domestic terrorist group is engaged in a campaign of public assassinations of politicians and celebrities, as well as high-profile bombings. Determined to paralyze the country in order to impose their own ideologies, only Op-Center’s Black Wasp team can defeat these revolutionaries. However, even as Admiral Chase Williams and his agents force them on the run, the Black Order possesses a weapon of mass destruction that they will not hesitate to unleash against millions of innocent civilians.
21	Call of Duty	2022	978-1250782861	Jeff Rovin	After their latest hypersonic weapons test ends in failure, the Chinese government sets their sights on the chief engineer of the project as the scapegoat and is arrested—unable to help his family as they are hunted down by the military. Op-Center’s Lt. Grace Lee is sent to China on a solo reconnaissance mission, but when she sees an opportunity to free the imprisoned scientist, she seizes it. With Lee on the run and the Chinese at her heels, Director Chase Williams sends the rest of Op-Center to Mongolia as an extraction team. Meanwhile, the engineer’s son has aligned himself with a dangerous group of counterrevolutionaries hellbent on dismantling the Communist regime, putting his father’s life—and his own—in jeopardy. The Black Wasp team races to rescue their colleague and her high-risk companion without setting off an international incident that leaves China ready to release their greatest weapon yet.
22	Fallout	2023	978-1250868725	Jeff Rovin	Following the successful extraction of a Chinese scientist from captivity and bringing him to safety in America, Chinese assassins target members of the Black Wasp team engaged in several covert strikes from multiple embassies in Washington, D.C. Additionally, these assassins have managed to infiltrate the U.S. intelligence community, seemingly aware of every move that the team makes. Complicating matters is the new President of the United States, who appears willing to let Op-Center take the fall for the mission that precipitated the crisis. When one of their own is killed, the surviving members of Black Wasp seek both a safe haven and an ally in the fight for survival -- an unexpected partner who might be part of the problem.

== National Crisis Management Center (Op-Center) ==
Although familiarly called "Op-Center", the actual name of the largely autonomous agency is the "National Crisis Management Center". The charter of the NCMC, or Op-Center, is unlike any other in the history of the United States. They handle both domestic and international crises. Director Paul Hood reports to the President, and what had started as "an information clearinghouse with SWAT capabilities" now has the singular capacity to monitor, initiate, and manage operations worldwide. The organization had its own paramilitary response team, called the Striker team, named by an Op-Center member who was a soccer fan, composed of members of the U.S. military special operations community. The series also mentioned organizations from England, whose response team was called Bengal, and Russia, with a team called Hammer. It is headquartered in an undistinguished, two-story building located near the Naval Reserve flight line at Andrews Air Force Base that used to be a ready room, a staging area for crack flight crews. In the event of a nuclear attack, it would have been their job to evacuate key officials from Washington, D.C.

According to the 2014 reboot franchise, the NCMC was eventually disbanded after the Secretary of Defense and the Director of National Intelligence managed to convince the President of the United States to shut the organization down due to the effectiveness of the US Intelligence Community and Special Forces in the War on Terror (much to the disgust of Paul Hood and Mike Rogers). Years later however, terrorists blow up several NFL stadiums across the country and leave thousands dead or mutilated. It is determined in the resulting investigation that the inability of government agencies to prevent the attacks was due to a lack of information, as well as the inability to put the pieces together in time. In response, the President executes an emergency order that reboots Op-Center for the 21st Century. Retired Admiral Chase Williams is eventually named the new director and Op-Center's new headquarters is located in the basement of the National Geospatial-Intelligence Agency; as its response team, Op-Center utilizes soldiers from the Joint Special Operations Command for overseas missions and a SWAT team from the FBI's Critical Incident Response Group in order to respond to domestic emergencies.

== Net Force ==
The third Op-Center novel, Games of State, briefly alludes to the concept of a "Net Force". This concept was later expanded into its own Net Force series, created by the same men as Op-Center, but written by Steve Perry (and later cowritten with Larry Segriff). No direct connection has yet been drawn between the two series, however.

== In other media ==
OP Center was a 1995 made-for-TV movie starring Harry Hamlin as Paul Hood, newly minted director of the "OP Center".

In The Simpsons episode "Sweets and Sour Marge", it reveals that Moe Szyslak's favourite book is Tom Clancy's Op-Center.
