= Russell Davis (writer) =

American author

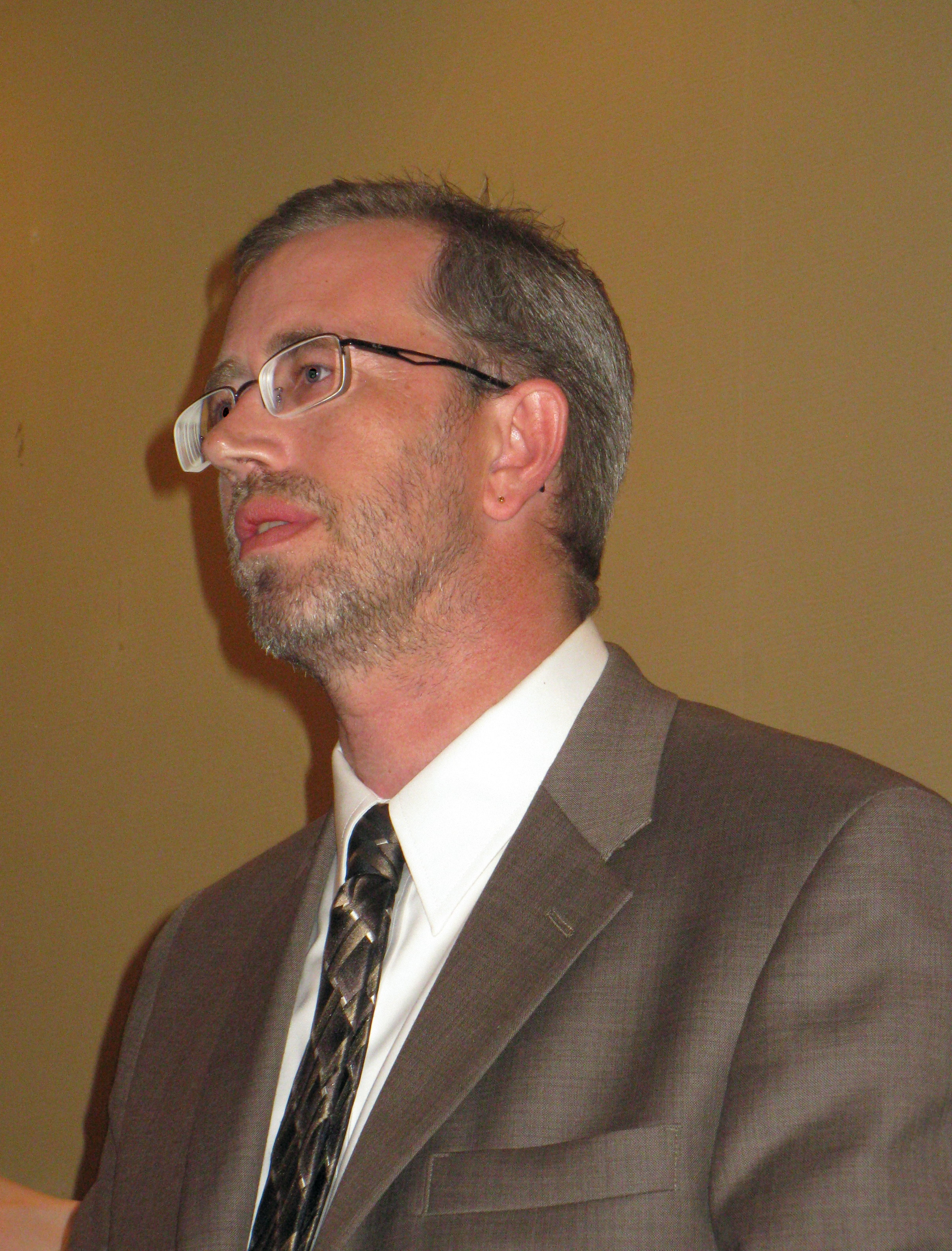
- Davis at the Nebula Awards in 2010
- Born: 1970 (age 55–56); Missouri, U.S.
- Occupation: Author
- Writing career
- Pen name: David Cian; Garrett Dylan; Dylan Garrett; D.L. Lawson; Cliff Ryder (shared); Jenna Solitaire; Christopher Tracy
- Years active: 1998–present

Russell Davis (born 1970) is an American author born in Missouri. His publications include more than 20 novels and 30 short stories. Davis, who writes in many genres, was the president of the Science Fiction and Fantasy Writers of America (SFWA) from 2008 to 2010, and a member of the Western Writers of America (WWA). He has also worked as an editor and book packager.

Davis has written for publication under the names David Cian, Garrett Dylan and Dylan Garrett, D.L. Lawson, Cliff Ryder, Jenna Solitaire and Christopher Tracy as well as his real name. Cliff Ryder is a house pseudonym shared by multiple writers.

== Selected works ==
=== Novels ===
==== Tom Clancy's Net Force Explorers ====
- Cloak and Dagger (2001) with John Helfers ISBN 0-425-18303-3

==== Transformers ====
- Annihilation (2003) as David Cian ISBN 0-7434-7442-2
- Fusion (2004) as David Cian

==== The Twilight Zone ====
- A Gathering of Shadows (2003) ISBN 0-7434-7471-6

==== Standalone novels ====
- Touchless (2002) ISBN 1-59224-987-6
- The Adventures of the Librarian: Quest for the Spear (2004) – TV movie novelization as by Christopher Tracy ISBN 1-4165-0486-9
- Megawar (2005) as David Cian ISBN 1-59687-152-0
- Jersey (2013) ISBN 1-4922-2329-8

==== As by Cliff Ryder ====
Among the Room 59 spy novels published under the name Cliff Ryder, a house pseudonym shared by multiple writers, Davis takes credit for two for which he has been acknowledged under the pseudonym Garrett Dylan.

- Out of Time (2008)
- The Ties that Bind (2008)

=== Collections ===
- Waltzing with the Dead (2004) ISBN 1-59224-615-X
- The End of All Seasons (2013) ISBN 1-4344-4171-7

=== Anthologies edited ===
- Mardi Gras Madness: Tales of Terror and Mayhem in New Orleans (2000) with Martin H. Greenberg ISBN 1-58182-077-1
- Apprentice Fantastic (2002) with Greenberg ISBN 0-7564-0093-7
- Transformers Legends (2004) as David Cian ISBN 0-7434-9791-0
- Faerie Tales (2004) with Greenberg ISBN 0-7564-0182-8
- Haunted Holidays (2004) with Greenberg ISBN 0-7564-0223-9
- Millennium 3001 (2006) with Greenberg ISBN 0-7564-0322-7
- If I Were An Evil Overlord (2007) with Greenberg ISBN 0-7564-0384-7
- Courts of the Fey (2011) with Greenberg ISBN 978-0-7564-0699-8

=== Short fiction ===
- "Dead Tired" (1998)
- "One Tree Hill" (1998)
- "The End of Winter" (1998)
- "The Body Clock" (1999)
- "The Death of Winston Foster" (1999)
- "The End of Summer" (1999)
- "Goliath" (1999)
- "Fat Tuesday" (2000)
- "Across Hickman's Bridge to Home" (2000)
- "A Kiss at Midnight" (2001)
- "King of Thorns" (2001)
- "A Weapon of Flesh and Bone" (2001) with Tim Waggoner
- "Omega Time" (2002)
- "Countdown" (2004)
- "The Last Day of the Rest of Her Life" (2004)
- "The Hollywood Dilemma" (2005)
- "The Things She Handed Down" (2005)
- "Midnight at the Half-Life Café" (2005)
- "The Angel Chamber" (2005)
- "The End of Spring" (2006)
- "When I Look to the Sky" (2007)
- "Engines of Desire & Despair" (2007)
- "Scars Enough" (2008)
- "Houdini's Mirror" (2008)
- "An Orchid for Valdis" (2008)
