= Tom Clancy's Op-Center: Acts of War =

1997 novel by Jeff Rovin

Op-Center: Acts of War
- Author: Jeff Rovin
- Language: English
- Series: Tom Clancy's Op-Center
- Genre: Techno-thriller, Spy novel
- Publisher: HarperCollins
- Publication date: March 1997
- Publication place: United States
- Media type: Print (Hardcover & Paperback)
- Pages: 492 pp
- ISBN: 0-00-225450-6
- OCLC: 43221182
- Preceded by: Games of State
- Followed by: Balance of Power

Tom Clancy's Op-Center: Acts of War is a technothriller by Jeff Rovin.

== Plot introduction ==
The mobile Regional Operations Center (ROC) in Turkey investigates a dam blown up by Kurdish militants. The ROC is later taken hostage by the Kurdish militants who blew the dam.

== Characters in Tom Clancy's Op-Center: Acts of War ==
- Mike Rodgers- General, in charge of ROC
- Paul Hood
- Lowell Coffey II- Attorney, 40, civilian assigned to ROC
- Ibrahim al-Rashid- Syrian Kurd
- Mahmoud al-Rashid- Syrian Kurd
- Dr. Phil Katzen- Biophysicist, 33, cilivan assigned to ROC
- Dr. Mary Rose Mohalley- Computer programmer, 29, civilian assigned to ROC

== Major themes ==
- The desire of the Kurdish people for an independent state. The novel implies that the Kurds from Syria, Turkey, and Iraq work together to force a war between the government of Turkey and Syria, with the eventual goal of being granted an individual territory.
- Injustices suffered by the Kurds at the hands of the governments of the nations they live in.
- Volatility of Middle-East region, both politically and ideologically

== Release details ==
The novel was released in 1997, prior to the attack on the World Trade Center towers and the subsequent invasion of Afghanistan and Iraq, but after the establishment of an Iraqi Kurdistan in Iraq from the aftermath of the Gulf War.
