= Tom Clancy's Op Center (film) =

- Based on: Tom Clancy's Op-Center
- Screenplay by: Tom Clancy; Steve Pieczenik; Steve Sohmer
- Directed by: Lewis Teague
- Starring: Harry Hamlin; Kabir Bedi; Deidre Hall; Bo Hopkins; Ken Howard; John Savage; Kim Cattrall; Lindsay Frost; Rod Steiger; Wilford Brimley; Carl Weathers; Sherman Howard
- Theme music composer: Patrick Williams
- Country of origin: United States
- Original language: English

Production
- Producer: Richard L. O'Connor
- Cinematography: Alan Otino Caso
- Editor: Tina Hirsch
- Running time: 170 minutes (miniseries); 114 minutes (film)

Original release
- Network: NBC
- Release: February 26 – February 27, 1995

Tom Clancy's Op Center (stylized as OP Center) is a 114-minute action-political thriller film which was edited-down from a 170-minute, 4-hour television miniseries of the same name that aired in two parts on NBC on February 26–27, 1995.

Directed by Lewis Teague and produced by Richard L. O'Connor, with story by Tom Clancy, Steve Pieczenik and Steve Sohmer, it features an ensemble cast including Harry Hamlin, Lindsay Frost, Wilford Brimley, Deidre Hall, Ken Howard, Bo Hopkins, Carl Weathers, Kim Cattrall, John Savage and Rod Steiger. The miniseries was directed by Lewis Teague.

== Plot ==
In post-Cold War Washington, an inexperienced political appointee, Paul Hood (Hamlin), is named head of the supposedly obsolete National Crisis Management Center (NCMC) with an eye to downsizing it. No sooner is he introduced around by the NCMC’s deputy director, Brigadier General Mike Rodgers (Carl Weathers), than he's in the middle of a crisis: a rogue KGB unit hijacks three Ukrainian-based nuclear warheads for sale to the Middle East. National Security Advisor Vice Admiral Troy Davis (Brimley) orders Hood and the Op Center to locate the warheads, verify their location and prepare a viable recovery plan.

Hood is initially handicapped by ignorance and naivete; when told about a honeytrap, he asks: "Who are we working for: the United States government or the Mafia?" Nonetheless, he quickly demonstrates the ability to absorb new information and lead intelligently. The warheads are located and electronically confirmed aboard a KGB front-owned freighter sailing down the Bosphorus with a declared destination of Mombasa.

But top-secret information is leaking to high-powered Washington reporter Kate Michaels (Deidre Hall) and to the Israelis, whose Mossad representative Werkauf (Luis Avalos) threatens will take unilateral action if the United States does not. Hood is further harassed when his unhappy wife Jane (Cattrall), who doesn't like Washington or understand the seriousness of his job, leaves town. This gives Pamela Bluestone (Lindsay Frost), the Center's brilliant psychiatrist nicknamed "mind-reader and Good Witch of the East," the opening to make a play for Hood.

Before any action can be taken, the intelligence leak must be pinpointed and plugged. To that end, the Center plants a bogus intelligence report on Admiral Davis for White House consumption, only to confirm that the leak leads from the President (Ken Howard) to the Israelis via Kate Michaels, the President's mistress.

Hood and the Center reveal the deception to Admiral Davis and present the chain of evidence. Davis in turn forces the President to end his liaison with Michaels. Meanwhile, Hood, dispirited by Jane's departure, tries to resign, but Admiral Davis talks him out of it.

With their source blown, the Israelis give Hood the buyer's identity and his file: Abdul Fazawi (Kabir Bedi), former Mossad agent-turned-arms-dealer. Fazawi must be neutralized before the recovery operation begins or he will disappear to set up another such deal.

Then wily rogue KGB Colonel Stolipin (Sherman Howard) alters the ship's course towards Libya, reducing the timeframe in which the recovery team, codenamed "Linebacker", can act. Hood sends Bluestone and Dan McCaskey (Bo Hopkins), deputy assistant FBI director and the Center's crime/terrorism expert, to New York to arrest Fazawi, who must be in custody before "Linebacker" moves. But Fazawi is late to his rendezvous. When he does show up he is successfully arrested but Werkauf shoots him dead and wounds McCaskey and another FBI agent before being shot dead himself. With hindsight Bob Herbert (John Savage), the Center's Intelligence Officer, realizes that the Israelis used the Center to flush Fazawi into the open. Meanwhile, "Linebacker" has gone into action. Following a short, hard fight they take control of the ship, the surviving crew and the warheads, and also disarm the scuttling charge.

At a press conference the following day, the President announces that contrary to 'irresponsible... unfounded reports', there are no stolen nuclear warheads: the US, Russia and Israel have just concluded a joint exercise simulating theft and recovery of dummy warheads, and to prove it he introduces the Russian and Israeli ambassadors to answer questions. When asked how she got the Russians and Israelis to cooperate, Liz Gorman (Mia Korf), the Center's long-suffering and resourceful Press and Congressional Liaison, replies: "I appealed to their sense of national interest... Well you know: blackmail."

Davis confirms Hood head of the Center for as long as he wants the job. Hood declines an interview request from The Washington Post and heads home to his two preteen daughters, alone with the housekeeper while their mother is out of town. But when he opens the door his wife is waiting instead: Admiral Davis had called Jane to explain why Paul has been so busy. As she takes him into her arms, he hesitantly returns the embrace, a wary look on his face.

== Cast (partial) ==
NCMC Staff

- Harry Hamlin as Paul Hood, Director NCMC
- Carl Weathers as Brigadier General Mike Rodgers, Deputy Director NCMC
- Bo Hopkins as Dan McCaskey, FBI & Interpol Officer & Deputy Assistant Director of the FBI
- Lindsay Frost as Pamela Bluestone, Psychiatrist
- Mariangela Pino as Martha Macken, Political & Economics Officer
- John Savage as Bob Herbert, National Intelligence Officer
- Tom Bresnahan as Matt Stoll, Operations Support
- Mia Korf as Liz Gorman, Press & Congressional Liaison
- David Garrison as Bill Mathis, Sciences and Environmental Officer
- Todd Waring as Lowell Coffey, Lawyer & legal Advisor
- Elizabeth Alley as Sergeant King, Ops Room Communications Operator
- Lou Liberatore as Surveillance Technician

Washington

- Ken Howard as The President
- William Bumiller as Lou Bender, Presidential Aid
- Wilford Brimley as Vice Admiral Troy Davis

Other cast members

- Kabir Bedi as Abdul Fazawi, Arms Dealer
- Deidre Hall as Kate Michaels, Reporter
- Sherman Howard as Uri Stalipin
- Victor Love as Captain Ted Drake
- France Nuyen as Li Tang, Antique Book Shop Madame
- Luis Avalos as Verkauf, Mossad
- Kim Cattrall as Jane Hood, Wife
- Rod Steiger as Rudi Kushnerov, Boroda Russian Liaison
- George Alvarez as Captain Rodriguez
- Robert Broyles as Chief
- Tom Villard as Press Aide

== Crew (partial) ==
Producer: Richard L. O'Connor

Executive Producers: Tom Clancy, Toni Dailey, Steve Pieczenik, Steve Sohmer, Brandon Tartikoff
Director: Lewis Teague
Music: Patrick Williams
Film Editing: Tina Hirsch

Cinematography: Alan Otino Caso, Casting: Joel Thurm, Production Design: Donald Light-Harris, Art Direction: Erik Olson, Set Decoration: Ronald R. Reiss, Costume Design: Darryl Levine, Hair Stylist: Mimi Jafari, Makeup Artist: Martha Preciado, Special Effects: Kam Cooney, Stunt coordinator: Chuck Waters.

== Production notes ==
The series was filmed in Los Angeles and Washington, D.C., by MT3 Services in association with New World Entertainment.

It received the 1995 Primetime Emmy Award for Outstanding Individual Achievement in Sound Editing for a Miniseries or a Special for Part I. Tina Hirsch was also nominated for a 1996 Best Edited Episode from a Television Mini-Series award by the American Cinema Editors, USA for Part I.

== Reception ==
Note: these reviews reference the original 170-minute mini-series, not the 114-minute edited version.

"Op Center Drowns In Numbing Details. The Four-hour Mini-series Is A Talky Piece Dressed As A High-tech Espionage Thriller. It's Not Just The Weapons That Are Deadly" introduced Jonathan Short's 1995 review in The Philadelphia Inquirer. While praising Rod Steiger and pitying Hamlin for some of the lines he had to utter, his review objected to what Short felt was over-simplification: too much talking and not enough action. In his words "It's certainly very kind of writer Steve Sohmer to think of the mentally challenged", and went on to compare it to Get Smart without actually naming that series.

John P. McCarthy's review in Variety (February 23, 1995) called it "...a moderately insightful, by-the-numbers lesson in geopolitics" though "the team's banter tends to be sophomoric." Nonetheless he praised "The strong ensemble (which) occasionally rises above the material." He also pointed out the series' three themes: the cost of serving one's country in terms of broken homes; "deception, which brings in issues like adultery and spousal abuse. Patriotism at this level involves great personal sacrifice, and no one — enemy or lover — can be trusted." Thirdly, "The U.S. is not prepared for international crises..."

Steve Johnson, of the Chicago Tribune, after decrying the script's lack of subtly, confusing "techno-chatter" and "stick figures", felt that "...it deftly conveys the claustrophobic, paranoiac atmosphere of a place such as Op Center's headquarters. In this environment, everybody is tailing everybody else..." Johnson concluded: "It's ultimately worth the attention required, because a well-plotted, fast-paced story unfolds, one that does a good job of moving the spy thriller genre onto the less certain sands of modern geopolitics".
