= The Encyclopedia of Superheroes =

Encyclopedia about comic book superheroes

- Author: Jeff Rovin
- Publisher: Facts On File Inc
- Publication date: 1985
- ISBN: 978-0816016792

The Encyclopedia of Superheroes is a 1985 reference book written by Jeff Rovin and published by Facts on File that gives biographical details about comic book superheroes.

== Description ==
The Encyclopedia of Superheroes is a listing of comic book superheroes that lists details of each superhero, alter ego, back story, occupation, appearance and costume, tools, weapons, powers and a short biography.

== Reception ==
In the April 1988 edition of Dragon (Issue #132), Jeff Grubb found that this book was "usable, fun and enjoyable." Grubb liked its completeness, "running the gamut from the funny-book heroes (Superman and Spider-Man) to the heroes of the pulps (Doc Savage and G-8), cartoons (Roger Ramjet and Fearless Fly), and legend and literature (Heracles and Tarzan)." Although Grubb noted that much material on modern superheroes was already dated, "there is a wealth of material on many heroes of the 1940s and 1950s who have never been seen since, their companies having quietly folded in the passage of time." He concluded with a strong recommendations, saying, "If you are interested in superheroes, Rovin's text is the best volume on this subject."

In the Austin American-Statesman, Chris Walters called the encyclopedia "a stunning feat of research... One can't help but be astounded by the prolific craziness of it all. Anyone who has ever wanted to be superhuman will recognize this book as a fantasy bonanza."

The Philadelphia Daily News used the encyclopedia to list "genuine champions of liberty and justice you've probably never heard of," including Chameleon Boy, the Gay Ghost, Johnny Quick and Liberty Belle.

== Reviews ==
- Review by Carol McGuirk (1986) in Fantasy Review, January 1986
- Review by David Pringle (1987) in Interzone, #22 Winter 1987
