= The Encyclopedia of Super-Villains =

1987 reference book by Jeff Rovin

The Encyclopedia of Super-Villains is a 1987 reference book written by Jeff Rovin and published by Facts on File that gives biographical details about comic book villains.

== Reception ==
In the April 1988 edition of Dragon (Issue #132), Jeff Grubb reviewed this book and its companion, The Encyclopedia of Superheroes, and found that this book was good, but not as good as the Superheroes book. Grubb found this book "has a major flaw in organization", where major villains are detailed in the entries of otherwise less notable villains rather than having their own separate entries. Grubb also found several errors of fact, but concluded that although flawed, this book was "still an enjoyable and entertaining book".

The Santa Ynez Valley News called the book "colorful, slightly daffy, definitely bizarre, thrilling, nostalgic and most of all fun to read". The Regina Sun said: "Although a mug shot is not provided for every villain, the encyclopedia will still serve as a useful reference for trivia enthusiasts".
