= NetForce (film) =

- Genre: Action; Drama; Science fiction
- Based on: Tom Clancy's Net Force by Tom Clancy; Steve Pieczenik
- Written by: Lionel Chetwynd
- Story by: Tom Clancy; Steve Pieczenik
- Directed by: Robert Lieberman
- Starring: Scott Bakula; Joanna Going; Kris Kristofferson; Brian Dennehy
- Music by: Jeff Rona
- Country of origin: United States
- Original language: English

Production
- Producer: Dennis E. Doty
- Cinematography: David Hennings
- Editor: Alan L. Shefland
- Running time: 200 minutes
- Production companies: Cates/Doty Productions; Greengrass Productions
- Budget: $20 million

Original release
- Network: ABC
- Release: February 1, 1999

NetForce is a 1999 American made-for-television science fiction action drama film directed by Robert Lieberman, written by Lionel Chetwynd, and starring Scott Bakula. Based on the Tom Clancy's Net Force series of novels created by Tom Clancy and Steve Pieczenik, it was broadcast on ABC in 1999.

== Plot ==
In 2005, Alex Michaels is deputy head of a new division of the FBI called "Netforce" which investigates computer crime and polices the Internet. When his boss and mentor, Steve Day, is assassinated, the evidence points to Web pioneer and owner of the company Januscorp, Will Stiles, a character said to be Bill Gates' apprentice. Stiles is about to release a new web browser that may allow him to hack into any computer in the world and to gain control of the Internet. Michaels is appointed acting Commander of Netforce, and leads his people on the hunt for Stiles.

== Cast ==
- Scott Bakula as Alex Michaels
- Kris Kristofferson as Steve Day
- Judge Reinhold as Will Stiles
- Cary-Hiroyuki Tagawa as Leong Cheng
- Joanna Going as Toni Fiorelli
- Brian Dennehy as Lowell Davidson
- CCH Pounder as FBI Director Sandra Knight
- Xander Berkeley as Bo Tyler
- Frank Vincent as Johnny Stompato
- Anjul Nigam as Uday Shankar

== Production ==
NetForce was shot in Los Angeles, Virginia, and Washington, DC.

== Reception ==
Bruce Fretts of Entertainment Weekly called it "boring cyber-nonsense". William McDonald of The New York Times wrote, "The movie does gather suspense and momentum in Part II, but so much is going on, and so much dialogue is devoted to explaining it, that no one has time to be interesting." Steve Johnson of the Chicago Tribune called it "pretty silly stuff".

== See also ==
- List of television films produced for American Broadcasting Company
