= Tom Clancy's Net Force =

Novel series

Tom Clancy's Net Force is a novel series, created by Tom Clancy and Steve Pieczenik and originally written by Steve Perry. The original series ceased publication in 2006. There was also a spin-off of young adult books called Net Force Explorers. The series was rebooted in 2019 with the Dark Web novel by Jerome Preisler.

== General ==
Tom Clancy's Net Force is aimed at an adult audience, while the related series Net Force Explorers (which follows the adventures of a teen auxiliary of the Net Force in 2025) is aimed at the older teen market.

The initial Net Force concept was alluded to in the third Op-Center novel, Games of State; given that Net Force was created by the same two men who created the Op-Center series, it can be assumed that they occur in the same universe. However, no direct connection has yet been drawn between the two.

== Main characters ==
These characters are in most or all books:

Name	Description
Commander Alex Michaels	Promoted to top spot in Net Force in the first book, resigns in Changing of the Guard; played by Scott Bakula in the NetForce TV movie
Toni Fiorella/Michaels	Has position under Alex Michaels and eventually marries him; played by Joanna Going in the NetForce TV movie
Jay Gridley	The main programmer for Net Force, often makes the key breakthroughs; played by Paul Hewitt in the NetForce TV movie
General John Howard	The leader of Net Force's military arm, plans and executes the extractions or incursions; played by Sterling Macer Jr. in the NetForce TV movie
Lieutenant Julio Fernandez	Friend of John Howard, also in Net Force's military unit
Commander Thomas Thorn	Took over the top spot in Net Force after Alex Michaels resigned in Changing of the Guard
General Abraham Kent	A lifetime Marine officer, he takes General Howard's place as the leader of Net Force's military arm in Changing of the Guard

== Original series ==
The books in the Tom Clancy's Net Force series so far are:

#	Title	Publication date	ISBN	Plot	Notes
1	Net Force	1998	ISBN 0-425-16172-2	Russian hacker Vladimir Plekhanov is wreaking havoc using computers, to gain money from security contracts. With the money, he plans to buy governments so he will be rich and powerful. Net Force eventually track him down and capture him in a daring mission to Chechnya. As Director Steve Day was assassinated, Alex Michaels is promoted to Commander of Net Force.	
2	Hidden Agendas	1999	ISBN 0-425-17139-6	Thomas Hughes is an aide to an important government minister. Using his position, he gains access to many secret passcodes and pieces of information. Using his racist assistant, Platt, he posts secrets on the web. All the time, he is diverting attention from his real plan: to steal $150 million and own the government of Guinea-Bissau. Again, Net Force find out his plan and manage to stop him.	
3	Night Moves	1999	ISBN 0-425-17400-X	Peter Bascoomb-Coombes, a brilliant scientist, has created a quantum computer capable of breaking into supposedly secure places. He puts Net Force's best programmer, Gridley, out of action by inducing a stroke over the 'Net. The action takes place in England and Net Force eventually apprehend or kill the people involved.	
4	Breaking Point	2000	ISBN 0-425-17693-2	Morrison, another great scientist, uses Extremely Low Frequencies (ELF) to turn large groups of people mad, so they start attacking each other. The Chinese are prepared to pay $400 million for his information and Morrison is prepared to deal. He hires Ventura, an assassin turned bodyguard, to protect him.	
5	Point of Impact	2001	ISBN 0-425-17923-0	Robert "Bobby" Drayne is a chemist who is far away from the competition. He deals in "Thor's Hammer" - a drug which can make people superhuman in strength and intelligence. He is making money by selling it over the 'Net. Net Force are asked to help investigate and locate the dealer. He is eventually killed, in a surprising twist, by someone working for a pharmaceutical company.	
6	CyberNation	2001	ISBN 0-425-18267-3	CyberNation is an online world where people live and pay taxes. A controversial idea, it needs a lot more support before Congress will recognise it as a "real" state. Using a team of programmers, they launch attacks on the web that convince people that their ISP is unreliable, thus convincing them to join CyberNation. Net Force stop them before their main attack, but CyberNation does not go down.	
7	State of War	2003	ISBN 0-425-18813-2	This follows directly on from "CyberNation". We find that after Net Force ended the attacks on the web, the legitimate side of CyberNation continues to flourish and has even launched legal action against Net Force, claiming excessive force during their storming of the CyberNation cruise ship. This however is only a stalling tactic, and CyberNation's famous lawyer instead finds himself on the wrong side of the law as his hired hitman spins out of control.	
8	Changing of the Guard	2003	ISBN 0-425-19376-4	The Net Force leadership is in transition. An encrypted message is intercepted and partially decoded by Net Force, revealing a list of Russian spies. Samuel Cox, a powerful American businessman, fears that his name is on the list and will stop at nothing to prevent its discovery.	
9	Springboard	2005	ISBN 0-425-19953-3	A top secret Pentagon wargame is hacked. Only Net Force has the expertise to track down the culprit, but they are tied up with other priorities. Due to shifting budget priorities, Net Force is moved onto the DoD budget. That means that as a military operation, they can now give top priority to the Pentagon's problem. They soon make a connection between the attack and a Chinese general in Macau.	
10	The Archimedes Effect	2006	ISBN 0-425-20424-3	An army base is attacked and NetForce is called in to track down the culprits. It turns out that the bad guys are using a massive online VR game to have people test ways of getting into the bases. Captain Lewis, an attractive computer woman who works with Jay on the case turns out to be the criminal though she tried to seduce Jay throughout the book. She is finally caught in the end.	
10.5	Code War	2013			novella

== Relaunch series ==
The books in the Tom Clancy's Net Force Relaunch series so far are:

#	Title	Publication date	ISBN	Plot	Notes
0.5	Eye of the Drone	2020	ISBN 1-09-415001-0		Prequel novella to Dark Web
1	Dark Web	2019	ISBN 1-335-91784-5		
2	Attack Protocol	2020	ISBN 1-335-08084-8		
2.5	Kill Chain	2021	ISBN 1-66506-884-1		Novella taking place between Attack Protocol and Threat Point
3	Threat Point	2021	ISBN 1-335-65288-4		
4	Moving Target	2023	ISBN 1-335-66654-0		

== In other media ==
The first book of the series, Net Force, was adapted and altered into a made-for-TV film in 1999, starring Scott Bakula as Alex Michaels and Joanna Going as Toni Fiorella.
