= Tom Clancy =

American author (1947–2013)

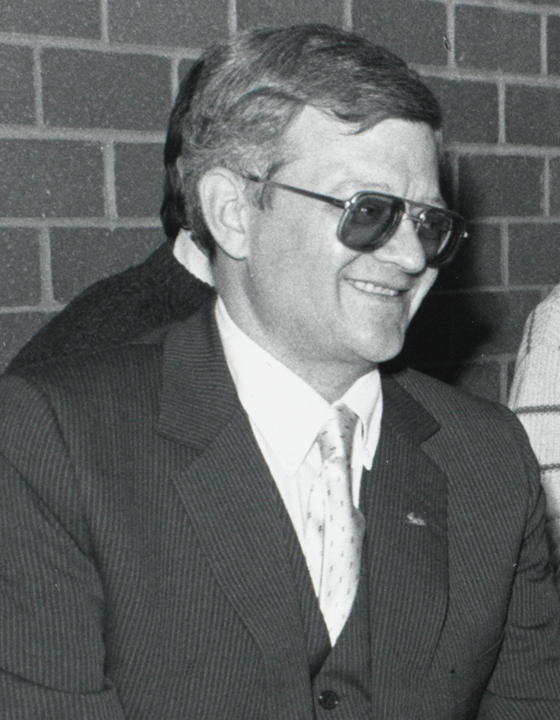
- Clancy at Burns Library in November 1989
- Born: Thomas Leo Clancy Jr. April 12, 1947; Baltimore, Maryland, U.S.
- Died: October 1, 2013 (aged 66); Baltimore, Maryland, U.S.
- Education: Loyola College (BA)
- Spouses: Wanda Thomas King (m. 1969; div. 1999) Alexandra Marie Llewellyn (m. 1999)
- Children: 5
- Writing career
- Period: 1982–2013
- Genres: Techno-thriller; spy fiction; crime fiction; realistic fiction; military history; historical fiction
- Notable work: Ryanverse
- Website: tomclancy.com

Thomas Leo Clancy Jr. (April 12, 1947 – October 1, 2013) was an American writer. He was best known for his techno-thrillers, which feature technical details in espionage and military science settings. Originally an insurance agent, Clancy published his first novel, The Hunt for Red October, in 1984. Eighteen novels followed between 1986 and 2013.

Clancy's Ryanverse series features the character Jack Ryan, an analyst working for the Central Intelligence Agency. It ranks among the best-selling series of fictional books of all time, with more than 100 million copies in print. Clancy also wrote non-fiction books on military subjects and has created other techno-thriller series of novels bearing his name.

Clancy died in 2013 at the age of 66. His family estate has continued the Ryanverse through a series of authors. Clancy's creation has appeared in film and television, with Ryan being portrayed by five actors, and has also inspired video games such as the Rainbow Six, Ghost Recon, Splinter Cell and The Division series.

== Early life and education ==
Clancy was born on April 12, 1947, at Franklin Square Hospital in Baltimore, Maryland, and grew up in the Northwood neighborhood in northeast Baltimore. The family was Irish-American. He was the second of three children to Thomas Leo Clancy (1918–1995), who worked for the United States Postal Service, and Catherine Mary Clancy (née Langan; 1918–2001), who worked in a store's credit department. He was a member of Troop 624 of the Boy Scouts of America. Clancy's siblings are Patrick and Margaret.

Clancy's mother worked to send him to Loyola High School in Towson, Maryland, a private Catholic secondary school taught by the Jesuit religious order (Society of Jesus). He graduated from Loyola High School in 1965. He then attended the associated Loyola College (now Loyola University Maryland) in Baltimore. Clancy began his college career as a physics major. Due to poor grades, he later changed his concentration to English since "it was an easy major." Despite the academic change, he continued to be an indifferent student spending a majority of his time reading books on military and naval history instead of tending to his studies. Clancy graduated with a Bachelor of Arts in English Literature in 1969 receiving a 1.9/4.0 GPA. While at Loyola College, he was president of the chess club. He joined the Army Reserve Officers' Training Corps; however, he was ineligible to serve due to his myopia (nearsightedness), which required him to wear thick eyeglasses.

After graduating, Clancy earned certifications in business and insurance and worked for an insurance company in Hartford, Connecticut.

In 1973, Clancy joined the O. F. Bowen Agency, a small insurance agency based in Owings, Maryland, founded by his wife's grandfather. In 1980, he purchased the insurance agency from his wife's grandmother and wrote novels in his spare time. While working at the insurance agency, he wrote his debut novel, The Hunt for Red October (1984).

== Career ==
Clancy's literary career began in 1982 when he started writing The Hunt for Red October, which in 1984 he sold for publishing to the Naval Institute Press for $5,000. The publisher was impressed with the work; Deborah Grosvenor, the Naval Institute Press editor who read through the book, said later that she convinced the publisher: "I think we have a potential best seller here, and if we don't grab this thing, somebody else would." She believed Clancy had an "innate storytelling ability, and his characters had this very witty dialogue". Clancy, who had hoped to sell 5,000 copies, ended up selling over 45,000. After publication, the book received praise from President Ronald Reagan, who called the work "the best yarn", subsequently boosting sales to 300,000 hardcover and two million paperback copies of the book, making it a national bestseller. The book was critically praised for its technical accuracy, which led to Clancy's meeting several high-ranking officers in the U.S. military, as well as Steve Pieczenik, and to inspiration for recurring characters in his works. Clancy's novels focus on the hero, most notably Jack Ryan and John Clark, both Irish Catholics like himself. He repeatedly uses the formula whereby the heroes are "highly skilled, disciplined, honest, thoroughly professional, and only lose their cool when incompetent politicians or bureaucrats get in their way. Their unambiguous triumphs over evil provide symbolic relief from the legacy of the Vietnam War."

The Cold War epic Red Storm Rising (1986) was co-written (according to Clancy in the book's foreword) with fellow military-oriented author Larry Bond. The book was published by Putnam and sold almost a million copies within its first year. Clancy became the cornerstone of a publishing list by Putnam, which emphasized authors like Clancy who would produce annually. His publisher, Phyllis E. Grann, called these "repeaters."

=== Finances ===
Clancy has author status on the cover of dozens of books. Seventeen of his novels made it to the top of the New York Times best seller list. He co-authored memoirs of top generals, and produced numerous guided tours of the elite aspects of the American military. Andrew Bacevich states:

Clancy did for military pop-lit what Starbucks did for the preparation of caffeinated beverages: he launched a sprawling, massively profitable industrial enterprise that simultaneously serves and cultivates an insatiable consumer base. Whether the item consumed provides much in terms of nourishment is utterly beside the point. That it tastes yummy going down more than suffices to keep customers coming back.

By 1988, Clancy had earned $1.3 million for The Hunt for Red October and had signed a $3 million contract for his next three books. In 1992, he sold North American rights to Without Remorse for $14 million, a record for a single book. By 1997, Penguin Putnam Inc. (part of Pearson Education) paid Clancy $50 million for world rights to two new books and another $25 million to Red Storm Entertainment for a four-year book/multimedia deal. Clancy followed this up with an agreement with Penguin's Berkley Books for 24 paperbacks to tie in with the ABC television miniseries Tom Clancy's Net Force, which aired in the fall/winter of 1998. The Op-Center universe has laid the ground for the series of books written by Jeff Rovin, which was in an agreement worth $22 million, bringing the total value of the package to $97 million.

In 1993, Clancy joined a group of investors that included Peter Angelos, and bought the Baltimore Orioles from Eli Jacobs. In 1998, he tentatively reached an agreement to purchase the Minnesota Vikings, but had to abandon the deal because of a divorce settlement cost.

The first NetForce novel, titled Net Force (1999), was adapted as a 1999 TV movie starring Scott Bakula and Joanna Going. The first Op-Center novel (Tom Clancy's Op-Center published in 1995) was released to coincide with a 1995 NBC television miniseries of the same name starring Harry Hamlin and a cast of stars. Though the miniseries did not continue, the book series did, but later had little in common with the first TV miniseries other than the title and the names of the main characters.

Clancy wrote several nonfiction books about various branches of the U.S. Armed Forces (see nonfiction listing, in the bibliography article). He also branded several lines of books and video games with his name that are written by other authors, following premises or storylines generally in keeping with Clancy's works.

With the release of The Teeth of the Tiger (2003), Clancy introduced Jack Ryan's son and two nephews as main characters; those characters continued in his last four novels, Dead or Alive (2010), Locked On (2011), Threat Vector (2012), and Command Authority (2013).

In 2008, the French video game manufacturer Ubisoft purchased the use of Clancy's name for an undisclosed sum. It has been used in conjunction with video games and related products such as movies and books. Based on his interest in private spaceflight and his US$1 million investment in the launch vehicle company Rotary Rocket, Clancy was interviewed in 2007 for the documentary film Orphans of Apollo (2008).

== Political views ==
Clancy was a conservative and Republican, and dedicated several of his books to American conservative political figures, including Ronald Reagan. Clancy supported the National Rifle Association and opposed abortion.

Clancy praised President George W. Bush as a "good guy"; however, he opposed the Iraq War and argued it lacked a casus belli. Clancy once clashed with Richard Perle, with Clancy stating he almost "came to blows" with Perle, after Perle criticized Colin Powell for being too concerned with the lives of American troops.

Ahead of the 2004 U.S. presidential election, Clancy said that voting for Democrat John Kerry would be "a stretch for me", while also declining to endorse Bush.

Numerous scholars have examined the political dimensions of Clancy's books, especially in the context of the Cold War. Historian Walter Hixson has argued that Clancy's novels, especially The Hunt for Red October and Red Storm Rising, were "popular representations of Reagan-era Cold War values. They reflect both popular perceptions of Soviet behavior and the predominant national security values of the Reagan era."

=== September 11 attacks ===
On September 11, 2001, Clancy was interviewed by Judy Woodruff on CNN. During the interview, he noted that orthodox "Islam does not permit suicide." Among other observations during this interview, Clancy cited discussions he had with military experts on the lack of planning to deal with a hijacked plane being used in a suicide attack and criticized the news media's treatment of the United States Intelligence Community. Clancy appeared again on PBS's Charlie Rose, to discuss the implications of the day's events with Richard Holbrooke, New York Times journalist Judith Miller, and Senator John Edwards, among others. Clancy was interviewed on those shows because his book Debt of Honor (1994) included a scenario wherein a disgruntled Japanese airline pilot crashes a fueled Boeing 747 into the U.S. Capitol dome during an address by the President to a joint session of Congress, killing the President and most of Congress. In the book, Clancy also implies that Japan's prosperity is due primarily to unequal trading terms. In the book's sequel Executive Orders (1996), the president announces a new foreign policy doctrine, under which the United States will hold personally accountable any foreign leader who orders attacks on U.S. citizens, territory, or possessions in the future.

A week after the September 11 attacks, Clancy suggested on The O'Reilly Factor that American left-wing politicians were partly responsible for the failure to prevent the attacks due to their "gutting" of the Central Intelligence Agency.

== Personal life ==
Clancy's first wife, Wanda Thomas King, was a nurse. They married in 1969 and had four children. The couple separated briefly in 1995, and they permanently separated in December 1996. Wanda Clancy filed for divorce in November 1997, which became final in January 1999. As part of the divorce, she and Clancy split his minority stake in the Baltimore Orioles.

On June 26, 1999, Clancy married freelance journalist Alexandra Marie Llewellyn, whom he had met in 1997. Llewellyn is the daughter of J. Bruce Llewellyn and a family friend of Colin Powell, who originally introduced the couple to each other. They remained together until Clancy's death in October 2013. They had one daughter.

Clancy was a Roman Catholic. The plot of his novel Red Rabbit revolves around John Paul II. In a June 27, 1993, interview with The Washington Post, he was quoted as saying, "I've had [sex scenes] in my books before, but you had to look real fast because, you know, I'm a married Catholic and I don't do that." In a 2002 interview with Lev Grossman for Time magazine, Clancy lamented what he perceived as society's double standard in the way Catholics are viewed by some people in society in relation to other demographic segments: "You can't hate black people any more, of course, and you can't hate homosexuals any more, but you can hate all the Catholics you want."

=== Property ===
Clancy's 80-acre estate, which was once a summer camp, is located in Calvert County, Maryland. It has a panoramic view of the Chesapeake Bay. The stone mansion, which cost $2 million, has 24 rooms and features a shooting range in the basement. The property also features a World War II–era M4 Sherman tank, a Christmas gift from his first wife.

Clancy also purchased a 17,000-square-foot penthouse condominium in the Ritz-Carlton, in Baltimore's Inner Harbor, for $16 million. Clancy and his wife combined four units to create the apartment.

His Chesapeake Bay estate sold for $4.9 million in 2020.

== Death and Legacy ==
Clancy died of heart failure on October 1, 2013, at Johns Hopkins Hospital, near his Baltimore home. John D. Gresham, a co-author and researcher with Clancy on several books, said Clancy had been suffering heart problems for some time prior: "Five or six years ago Tom suffered a heart attack and he went through bypass surgery. It wasn't that he had another heart attack, his heart just wore out."

The Chicago Tribune quoted Pulitzer Prize–winning film critic and author Stephen Hunter as saying, "When he published The Hunt for Red October, he redefined and expanded the genre, and as a consequence of that, many people were able to publish such books who had previously been unable to do so."

On March 31, 2014, the Orioles honored Clancy with a video tribute during their home opener, and the team wore a tribute patch on their jerseys through the season.

== Achievements and awards ==
- Clancy was one of only three authors to sell two million copies on a first printing in the 1990s (the others were John Grisham and J. K. Rowling). Clancy's novel Clear and Present Danger (1989) sold 1,625,544 hardcover copies, making it the #1 bestselling novel of the 1980s.
- Clancy received the Golden Plate Award of the American Academy of Achievement in 1988. Clancy was the Host of the 1995 Achievement Summit in Colonial Williamsburg and the 1997 Achievement Summit in Baltimore.
- Clancy received an honorary doctorate in humane letters and delivered the commencement address at Rensselaer Polytechnic Institute in 1992, and had since worked a reference to the school into many of his main works.
- Clancy was an honorary Yeoman Warder of the Tower of London and received the title "Supernumerary Yeoman"; he had been arrested for scaling the walls in his younger years.
- Clancy received the Alfred Thayer Mahan Award for Literary Achievement from the Navy League of the United States in 1990.

== Works ==
=== Fiction ===
- The Hunt for Red October (1984)
- Red Storm Rising (1986, with Larry Bond)
- Patriot Games (1987)
- The Cardinal of the Kremlin (1988)
- Clear and Present Danger (1989)
- The Sum of All Fears (1991)
- Without Remorse (1993)
- Debt of Honor (1994)
- Executive Orders (1996)
- SSN (1996, with Martin Greenberg)
- Rainbow Six (1998)
- The Bear and the Dragon (2000)
- Red Rabbit (2002)
- The Teeth of the Tiger (2003)
- Dead or Alive (2010, with Grant Blackwood)
- Against All Enemies (2011, with Peter Telep)
- Locked On (2011, with Mark Greaney)
- Threat Vector (2012, with Mark Greaney)
- Command Authority (2013, with Mark Greaney)

=== Non-fiction ===
- Submarine: A Guided Tour Inside a Nuclear Warship (1993)
- Armored Cav: A Guided Tour of an Armored Cavalry Regiment (1994)
- Fighter Wing: A Guided Tour of an Air Force Combat Wing (1995)
- Marine: A Guided Tour of a Marine Expeditionary Unit (1996)
- Airborne: A Guided Tour of an Airborne Task Force (1997)
- Into the Storm – On the Ground in Iraq (with Fred Franks) (1997)
- Carrier: A Guided Tour of an Aircraft Carrier (1999)
- Every Man a Tiger — the Gulf War Air Campaign (with Chuck Horner) (1999)
- Special Forces: A Guided Tour of U.S. Army Special Forces (2001)
- Shadow Warriors — Inside the Special Forces (with Carl Stiner) (2002)
- Battle Ready (with Anthony Zinni) (2004)

== Film, TV and video game adaptations ==
=== Films ===
Year	Title	Filmmaker/Director	Source material	Notes
1990	The Hunt for Red October	John McTiernan	The book	
1992	Patriot Games	Phillip Noyce	The book	
1994	Clear and Present Danger	Phillip Noyce	The book	
1995	Tom Clancy's Op Center	Lewis Teague	The series	A 114-minute action/political thriller which was edited down from a 170-minute, 4-hour TV mini-series of the same name that aired in two parts on NBC in February 1995
1999	NetForce	Robert Lieberman	The series	A television movie based on the Tom Clancy's Net Force series of novels created by Tom Clancy and Steve Pieczenik
2002	The Sum of All Fears	Phil Alden Robinson	The book	
2014	Jack Ryan: Shadow Recruit	Kenneth Branagh		Based on characters created by Clancy
2021	Without Remorse	Stefano Sollima	The book	
2026	Jack Ryan: Ghost War	Andrew Bernstein		Based on the character created by Tom Clancy and a continuation of the television series Jack Ryan (2018–2023).

=== Short films ===
- Ghost Recon: Alpha (2012)
- The Division: Agent Origins (2016)
- Ghost Recon Wildlands: War Within the Cartel (2017)

=== Television series ===
Year	Title	Created by	Notes
2018–2023	Tom Clancy's Jack Ryan	Carlton Cuse, Graham Roland	An American action political thriller web television series, based on characters from the fictional Ryanverse, that ran for four seasons on Amazon Prime Video.

=== Video games ===
Officially licensed games based on The Hunt for Red October and Red Storm Rising were released in the late 1980s and early 1990s for various 8-bit home computers such as the Commodore 64 and ZX Spectrum. Those included a submarine combat simulation (based on the book) and an action game (based on the film).

More recently, Ubisoft has made many video game series based on Tom Clancy's books, or which were endorsed by Clancy and use his name in the series' titles.

Year	Title
1996	Tom Clancy's SSN
1998–present	Tom Clancy's Rainbow Six series
1998	Tom Clancy's ruthless.com
2001–present	Tom Clancy's Ghost Recon series
2002–present	Tom Clancy's Splinter Cell series
2008	Tom Clancy's EndWar
2009–2010	Tom Clancy's H.A.W.X series
2016–present	Tom Clancy's The Division series
2019–present	Tom Clancy's Elite Squad
