= Steve Pieczenik =

American psychiatrist and writer

Steve R. Pieczenik
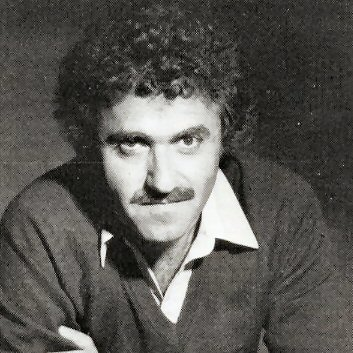
- Born: December 7, 1943 (age 82); Havana, Cuba
- Occupations: Author; publisher; civil servant; psychiatrist; conspiracy theorist
- Writing career
- Genres: War novel, spy
- Website: stevepieczenik.com

Steve R. Pieczenik (/pəˈtʃɛnɪk/) (born December 7, 1943) is a Cuban-American psychiatrist, author, publisher, and conspiracy theorist. In 1976, he was made Deputy Assistant Secretary of State under Henry Kissinger, Cyrus Vance and James Baker. He was later a consultant of the United States Department of State.

Pieczenik has made several appearances on InfoWars. He also claimed that the September 11 Attacks and the Sandy Hook Shooting were false flag operations.

== Early life and education ==
Pieczenik was born in Havana, Cuba on December 7, 1943, to Russian-Polish parents, and spent his early childhood in France. His father, a doctor from Dombrovicz who studied and worked in Toulouse, France, fled to Poland before World War II. His mother, a Russian Jew from Białystok, Poland, fled Europe after much of her family was killed.

The couple met in Portugal and relocated to Toulouse, France. After living in Toulouse for six years, Pieczenik's family migrated to Cuba, where Pieczenik was born, and then to the United States, where they settled in Harlem, New York City.

At the age of 16, Pieczenik received a scholarship to Cornell University, where he graduated with a BA degree in pre-medicine and psychology in 1964. He later received his M.D. from Cornell University Medical College. He claims he earned a PhD in international relations from MIT while studying at Harvard Medical School. During his psychiatry residency at Harvard, Pieczenik was awarded the Harry E. Solomon award for his paper "The hierarchy of ego-defence mechanisms in foreign policy decision making".

Pieczenik is fluent in five languages, including Russian, Spanish and French.

== Career ==
=== Civil service ===
In 1974, Pieczenik joined the United States Department of State as a consultant assisting in the restructuring of the Office for the Prevention of Terrorism. In 1976, he was made Deputy Assistant Secretary of State under Henry Kissinger, Cyrus Vance and James Baker. He also served the presidential administrations of Gerald Ford, Jimmy Carter, Ronald Reagan and George H. W. Bush in this role.

At the Department of State, Pieczenik served as a "specialist on hostage taking". He was credited with devising successful negotiating strategies and tactics, which were used in several high-profile hostage situations, such as the 1976 TWA Flight 355 hostage situation and the 1977 kidnapping of the son of Cyprus's president. Pieczenik also worked "side by side" with Police Chief Maurice J. Cullinane in the Washington, D.C. command center of Mayor Walter Washington during the 1977 Hanafi Siege.

On March 16, 1978, Pieczenik was a special envoy in Italy for President Carter to assist in the search for Italy's former Prime Minister Aldo Moro. As an international crisis manager and hostage negotiator, Pieczenik worked with Francesco Cossiga, the interior minister of Italy, on negotiations for Moro’s release. The role Pieczenik played in these negotiations is said to have been fraught with controversy.

Pieczenik said the committee was jolted into action by the fear that Moro would reveal state secrets in an attempt to free himself. Moro's widow, Eleonora, later said Henry Kissinger had allegedly warned her husband against his strategy of Historic Compromise (Compromesso Storico), allegedly saying, "you will pay dearly for it”. The leak of a false statement saying that Moro was dead was attributed to the Red Brigades (the group that had kidnapped Moro); however, in a documentary, Cossiga admitted the committee had made the decision to release the statement. Pieczenik stated that this had a dual purpose: to prepare the Italian public for the worst and to let the Red Brigades know that the state considered Moro dead, and therefore would not negotiate for him. Pieczenik said that Moro had been "sacrificed" for Italy's "stability".

Pieczenik claims to have been at Camp David on September 17, 1978, for the signing of the Camp David Accords, working out strategy and tactics based on psychopolitical dynamics.

In 1979, Pieczenik resigned as Deputy Assistant Secretary of State over the handling of the Iranian hostage crisis.

=== Post-civil service ===
In the early 1980s, Pieczenik wrote an article for The Washington Post in which he claimed to have heard a senior U.S. official in the Department of State Operations Center give permission for the attack that led to the death of U.S. Ambassador Adolph Dubs in Kabul, Afghanistan, in 1979.

In 1982, Pieczenik was mentioned in an article in The New York Times as "a psychiatrist who has treated C.I.A. employees". In a personal capacity, Pieczenik had been affiliated as a psychiatrist with the National Institute of Mental Health.

In 2001, Pieczenik operated as chief executive officer of Strategic Intelligence Associates, a consulting firm. As recently as October 6, 2012, Pieczenik was listed as a member of the Council on Foreign Relations (CFR). However, sometime between October 6 and November 18, 2012, his name was removed from the CFR roster.

Since 1979, Pieczenik has also consulted with the United States Institute of Peace and the RAND Corporation and lectured at the National Defense University.

== Writing ==
Pieczenik has made a number of ventures into fiction, as both an author and as a business partner of Tom Clancy. He co-authored the book Divide and Conquer. Pieczenik also received credit as co-creator for two of Tom Clancy’s best-selling novels Op-Center and Net Force.

Pieczenik has been credited under the pseudonym Alexander Court for writing the novels Active Measures (2001), and Active Pursuit (2002).

He has written two articles published in the American Intelligence Journal, a peer-reviewed journal issued by the National Military Intelligence Association.

Pieczenik co-authored a paper with John Neustadt which appeared in the July 2008 issue of Molecular Nutrition & Food Research.

== Controversies ==
In 1992, Pieczenik told Newsday that in his “professional opinion,” President George H. W. Bush was "clinically depressed". As a result of this statement, Pieczenik was brought up on ethics charges before the American Psychiatric Association and reprimanded. He then quit the APA.

=== Claims made on InfoWars ===
Pieczenik has appeared multiple times on InfoWars, the flagship radio program of Alex Jones, where he has made numerous statements, including that the Sandy Hook Elementary School shooting was a false flag operation. He has also claimed that the September 11 attacks were conducted by CIA agents.

After the 2020 United States presidential election, Pieczenik appeared on InfoWars claiming that the Trump administration had permitted the Democratic Party to engage in election fraud as a "sting operation" facilitated by a "QFS blockchain encryption code" on every ballot.

== Bibliography ==
=== Authored novels ===
- Mind Palace (1985)
- Blood Heat (1989)
- Hidden Passions (1991)
- Maximum Vigilance (1993)
- Pax Pacifica (1995)
- State of Emergency (1997)
- Active Measures (as Alexander Court, 2001)
- Active Pursuit (as Alexander Court, 2002)
- My Beloved Talleyrand (2005)
- Terror Counter Terror (2007)
- Steve Pieczenik Talks (2014)
- American Warrior in Crises (2019)

=== Series co-creator with Tom Clancy ===
- Tom Clancy's Op-Center
- Tom Clancy's Net Force

=== Other ===
- My Life Is Great! Why Do I Feel So Awful? (self-help, 1990)
- Foundations and Applications of Medical Biochemistry in Clinical Practice. With John Neustadt. (textbook, 2009)
