= The Gray Man (soundtrack) =

The Gray Man (Soundtrack from the Netflix Film)

Film score by Henry Jackman
- Released: July 22, 2022
- Recorded: 2021
- Studios: Abbey Road Studios, London; AIR Studios, London
- Genre: Film score
- Length: 1:20:50
- Label: Netflix Music
- Producer: Henry Jackman

Henry Jackman chronology
Ron's Gone Wrong (Original Motion Picture Soundtrack) (2021)	The Gray Man (Soundtrack from the Netflix Film) (2022)	Strange World (Original Motion Picture Soundtrack) (2022)

The Gray Man (Soundtrack from the Netflix Film) is the score album composed by Henry Jackman for the 2022 film of the same name. The film, directed and produced by Russo Brothers is based on the 2009 novel of the same name by Mark Greaney and the first film in a franchise based upon Greaney's Gray Man novels. The film stars Ryan Gosling, Chris Evans, Ana de Armas, Jessica Henwick, Regé-Jean Page, Wagner Moura, Julia Butters, Dhanush, Alfre Woodard, and Billy Bob Thornton.

Jackman began writing the entire scoring without watching any sequences from the film. He wrote a 17-minute suite for the film during March–December 2021, and derived the entire themes from the suite. Additional score recording and orchestration were done in April 2022. The score suite was released as a single from the album on July 15, and the soundtrack was released by Netflix Music on July 22, coinciding the film's release.

== Development ==
The film marked Jackman's fourth film with the Russo Brothers, following Captain America: The Winter Soldier (2014), Captain America: Civil War (2016) and Cherry (2021). He began writing the score in March 2021, with a 17-minute long score suite and completed within December. Initially, he did not write longer suites for films, excluding The Winter Soldier, which he had written a stand-alone piece. But for The Gray Man, he wrote a longer suite as it "contains almost all the ideas you need for the rest of the movie in some form or another."

During the period, Russo brothers asked him to write a score, for the scene, that focuses Six's (Ryan Gosling) internal trauma and "got a 'ghost in the machine' element showing that he was inarticulate for no reason". Jackman recorded demo pieces of the score in his IPhone and played it through piano, then he used a backward reverb effect and fine-tuned the cue. The theme started with an offbeat percussion sound, that invoked the classical 5/4 rhythm from Mission: Impossible theme and designed the percussion themes, that incorporates tick-tock figures, eerie music and minor chords, which Jackman described it as "very espionage". This suite served as the overture of all the film's themes.

Jackman chipped some parts of the piece, referring to record producer Trevor Horn's work in Art of Noise album, played few bar sounds. As the score getting expanded, he used atonal jazz chords with brass, referencing David Shire's score from The Taking of Pelham 123 (2009), that served as the theme for the antagonist Lloyd Hansen (Chris Evans). He used an expansive bass-line, and larger brass instruments, which referred Henry Mancini's signature-style brass sound. When the film's final edit was completed, Jackman sent the full score suite to Russo brothers, who finally approved, and Jackman later worked on specific pieces to be composed, except for most of the pieces as "it had its origin somewhere in the suite".

In April 2022, Jackman recorded the orchestral parts of the film in London at the Abbey Road Studios and AIR Studios. The orchestra, consisted of an 80-piece ensemble, mostly strings and brass, while an array of instruments include violin, viola, cello, double bass, trombones, French horn, trumpet, treble woodwinds, piano, harp and saxophone The musicians recorded the pieces separately due to the COVID-19 pandemic restrictions. Jackman used hand-made percussions, which recorded using synthesizers imported from 1970s, to make it sound analog; he engineered the sounds using sample collections of cymbals and bass to create unusual sound.

== Reception ==
Zanobard Reviews gave 6/10 to the score and wrote "Henry Jackman’s score for The Gray Man is an interesting one for sure. The opening seventeen minute long suite is the absolute highlight of the album, building quite a rich musical atmosphere for the score that initially shrouds itself in quiet, spy-like secrecy, before the music then slowly builds with some rather Blade Runner 2049-esque electronics until two rather enjoyable main themes then loudly and rather dramatically emerge; a distortedly jazzy, malevolent motif for Chris Evans' villain Lloyd Hansen, and a tense, brass-heavy theme for Ryan Gosling’s protagonist Sierra Six. The latter theme then builds the suite to a rather emphatic, in-your-face crescendo, making for quite an entertainingly loud finish to a pretty densely atmospheric track [...] the compositional style overall is good, and there are a couple of really solid action cues too dotted around the album, but the suite pretty much showcases all the thematic and stylistic ideation that you’re going to find in the full score, with the various thematic renditions across the score even playing pretty much exactly as they do in the suite, which leaves the full album overall feeling like little more than a larger extrapolation of the suite as a result. The suite and aforementioned action cues do make for a pretty compelling listen though, so if nothing else; give them a go."

Filmtracks.com gave a mixed review, saying "many listeners will find The Gray Man to be underachieving, but the extent to which it irritates the heck out of you will depend on your interest in the dominant manipulation of the sounds you hear. It's a really unpleasant work beyond its rather mindless constructs and unforgivable copying and pasting. On the other hand, there are actually a few compelling moments from Jackman, and they, not surprisingly, offer the orchestra in its full glory with minimal synthetic hackery of its mix. Just don't expect The Gray Man to impress much in the remainder of its exceedingly long and tedious album presentation."

== Track listing ==
All music is composed by Henry Jackman.

No.	Title	Length
1.	"The Gray Man"	17:10
2.	"Bangkok"	3:07
3.	"To Kill Your Own"	2:13
4.	"The Curse"	1:39
5.	"Shades of Gray"	2:03
6.	"A Question of Loyalty"	1:17
7.	"An Old Friend"	1:59
8.	"Lloyd Hansen"	2:55
9.	"Sky High"	3:06
10.	"Unstoppable, Uncatchable"	2:14
11.	"Ensnared"	2:31
12.	"Where’s the Target?"	3:08
13.	"A Timely Intervention"	1:42
14.	"Unexpected Ally"	2:00
15.	"An Honorable End"	3:07
16.	"Tango in Prague"	4:55
17.	"Lone Wolf"	2:38
18.	"Ghost in the Machine"	1:53
19.	"Against All Odds"	3:26
20.	"Missing a Wing"	2:35
21.	"Unhinged"	2:00
22.	"The Labyrinth"	3:51
23.	"Under the Blood-Red Sun"	3:11
24.	"Internal Affairs"	1:29
25.	"Bed of Secrets"	1:49
26.	"Exoneration"	1:43
27.	"Always Gray"	1:24

== Additional music ==
The film also featured several songs, that are not featured in the album. These include: "Lochloosa" (performed by JJ Grey & Mofro), "Clean Food" (performed by Boom Boom Cash, ft. F*kking Hero), "Tang High-Low (Playing Dice)" (performed by Waipog Petschsupan), "Toei From the Heart" (performed by Banyen Rakaaen), "Kol Slaven" (performed by The Sofia Brass Ensemble), "The Oogum Boogum Song" (performed by Brenton Wood), "Spinning Wheel" (performed by Shirley Bassey), "Silver Bird" (performed by Mark Lindsay), Tritsch-Tratsch-Polka, Op. 214 (performed by Wiener Sängerknaben, Gerald Wirth and Salonorechester Alt Wien), "Aline" (performed by Christophe) and "Wild Child" (performed by The Black Keys). The track "Silver Bird" was played in several instances, during moments in which Six and Claire (Julia Butters) are together. After the film's release, the track topped the LyricFind chart survey, nearly 50 years after the release.

== Chart performance ==
Chart (2022)	Peak position
UK Soundtrack Albums (OCC)	21
