= Roth/Kirschenbaum Films =

American film production company

- Logo used since 2019
- Formerly: Roth Films (2007–2016)
- Type: Private
- Industry: Motion pictures
- Founded: October 2007; 19 years ago
- Founder: Joe Roth; Jeff Kirschenbaum
- Headquarters: Los Angeles, California, U.S.
- Key people: Joe Roth; Jeff Kirschenbaum; Zack Roth; Dennis Stratton

Roth/Kirschenbaum Films (also known as RK Films) is an American film and television production company based in Los Angeles, California. It was founded in October 2007 by producer Joe Roth as Roth Films, and was renamed in 2015 following the addition of producer Jeff Kirschenbaum. The company is known for producing commercially successful films such as Alice in Wonderland (2010), Maleficent (2014), and entries in the Fast & Furious franchise. It has collaborated with major studios including Walt Disney Pictures, Sony Pictures, and Universal Pictures, and is primarily active in the fantasy, action, and family entertainment genres.

== History ==
In October 2007, following the conclusion of Revolution Studios' distribution agreement with Sony Pictures Entertainment, producer Joe Roth signed a new overall deal with Sony and established the production company originally known as Roth Films. The studio initially focused on producing big-budget, reimagined fairy tales and franchise films. Its first major production, Alice in Wonderland (2010), was a massive commercial success, grossing over $1 billion worldwide. Roth Films continued to produce high-profile fantasy films during this period, including Snow White and the Huntsman (2012), Oz the Great and Powerful (2013), and Maleficent (2014).

In August 2015, Jeff Kirschenbaum stepped down from his role as co-president of production at Universal Pictures to partner with Roth. Kirschenbaum and Roth had previously collaborated on Snow White and the Huntsman during Kirschenbaum's tenure at Universal. Upon his arrival, the company was officially rebranded to its current name, Roth/Kirschenbaum Films. Following the rebranding, the studio continued to develop major theatrical releases, including The Huntsman: Winter's War (2016), Alice Through the Looking Glass (2016), and the action sequel xXx: Return of Xander Cage (2017).

In the 2020s, Roth/Kirschenbaum Films expanded its output through extensive partnerships with major streaming platforms, particularly Netflix, while continuing to develop theatrical productions. The company produced the blockbuster franchise installments F9 (2021) and Fast X (2023) for Universal, as well as the critically acclaimed biographical drama The United States vs. Billie Holiday (2021). For Netflix, the company produced a string of high-profile films, including the Adam Sandler sports drama Hustle (2022), the big-budget action thriller The Gray Man (2022), the fantasy film Damsel (2024), and the action-comedy Jackpot! (2024). Additionally, the studio produced the 2023 box office hit romantic comedy Anyone But You for Sony Pictures.

== Filmography ==
=== Feature films ===
==== 2010s ====
Year	Title	Director	Distributor	Co-production companies	Budget	Gross (worldwide)
as Roth Films
2010	Alice in Wonderland	Tim Burton	Walt Disney Studios Motion Pictures	Walt Disney Pictures; The Zanuck Company; Team Todd	$150–200 million	$1.025 billion
2012	Snow White and the Huntsman	Rupert Sanders	Universal Pictures	N/A	$170 million	$396.6 million
2013	Oz the Great and Powerful	Sam Raimi	Walt Disney Studios Motion Pictures	Walt Disney Pictures; Curtis-Donen Productions	$200–215 million	$493.3 million
2014	Sabotage	David Ayer	Open Road Films	Albert S. Ruddy Productions; Crave Films; QED International	$35 million	$17.5-18.4 million
2014	Heaven Is for Real	Randall Wallace	Sony Pictures Releasing	TriStar Pictures; Affirm Films	$12 million	$101.3. million
2014	Million Dollar Arm	Craig Gillespie	Walt Disney Studios Motion Pictures	Walt Disney Pictures; Mayhem Pictures	$25 million	$39.2 million
2014	Maleficent	Robert Stromberg	Walt Disney Studios Motion Pictures	Walt Disney Pictures; The Zanuck Company	$180–263 million	$758.5 million
2015	In the Heart of the Sea	Ron Howard	Warner Bros. Pictures	Village Roadshow Pictures; RatPac-Dune Entertainment; COTT Productions; Enelmar Productions A.I.E. Spring Creek Pictures; Imagine Entertainment; Kia Jam	$100 million	$93.9 million
2016	Miracles from Heaven	Patricia Riggen	Sony Pictures Releasing	Affirm Films; Franklin Entertainment; Columbia Pictures	$13 million	$73.9 million
2016	The Huntsman: Winter's War	Cedric Nicolas-Troyan	Universal Pictures	Perfect World Pictures	$115 million	$165 million
2016	Alice Through the Looking Glass	James Bobin	Walt Disney Studios Motion Pictures	Walt Disney Pictures; Team Todd; Tim Burton Productions	$170 million	$299.5 million
as Roth/Kirschenbaum Films
2017	XXX: Return of Xander Cage	D.J. Caruso	Paramount Pictures	Revolution Studios; One Race Films	$85 million	$346.1 million
2019	Maleficent: Mistress of Evil	Joachim Rønning	Walt Disney Studios Motion Pictures	Walt Disney Pictures	$185 million	$491.7 million

==== 2020s ====
Year	Title	Director	Distributor	Co-production companies	Budget	Gross
2020	Dolittle	Stephen Gaghan	Universal Pictures	Perfect World Pictures; Team Downey	$175 million	$222.3 million
2021	The United States vs. Billie Holiday	Lee Daniels	Hulu	Lee Daniels Entertainment; New Slate Ventures; Sierra/Affinity	N/A	N/A
2021	F9	Justin Lin	Universal Pictures	Original Film; One Race Films; Perfect Storm Entertainment; China Film Co.	$200 million	$723 million
2022	Hustle	Jeremiah Zagar	Netflix	Happy Madison Productions; SpringHill Company	N/A	N/A
2022	The Gray Man	Anthony and Joe Russo	Netflix	AGBO	N/A	N/A
2022	The School for Good and Evil	Paul Feig	Netflix	Feigco Entertainment	N/A	N/A
2023	Fast X	Louis Leterrier	Universal Pictures	Original Film; One Race Films; Perfect Storm Entertainment; China Film Co.	$340 million	$714.6 million
2023	Anyone but You	Will Gluck	Sony Pictures Releasing	Columbia Pictures; SK Global; Fifty-Fifty Films; Olive Bridge Entertainment	$25 million	$216.9 million
2024	Damsel	Juan Carlos Fresnadillo	Netflix	PCMA	N/A	N/A
2024	A Family Affair	Richard LaGravenese	Netflix	N/A	N/A	N/A
2024	Jackpot!	Paul Feig	Amazon MGM Studios	Feigco Entertainment	N/A	N/A

==== Upcoming ====
Year	Title	Director	Distributor	Co-production companies
2028	Fast Forever	Louis Leterrier	Universal Pictures	One Race Films, Perfect Storm Productions, Original Film
TBA	13 Going on 30	Brett Haley	Revolution Studios	
TBA	Just Picture It	Lee Toland Krieger	Netflix	PCMA Productions

=== Television ===
Year	Title	Creator	Network	Co-production companies	Seasons	Episodes
2020	The Plot Against America	David Simon; Ed Burns	HBO	Annapurna Television; Blown Deadline Productions	1	6
2021	Panic	Lauren Oliver	Amazon Prime Video	Glasstown Entertainment; Adam Schroeder Entertainment; Picrow; Amazon Studios	1	10
