= Strange World (soundtrack) =

Strange World (Original Motion Picture Soundtrack)

Film score by Henry Jackman
- Released: November 23, 2022
- Recorded: 2022
- Studios: Sony Pictures Scoring Stage, Warner Bros. Eastwood Scoring Stage, The Village Studios
- Genre: Film score
- Length: 67:32
- Label: Walt Disney
- Producer: Henry Jackman

Henry Jackman chronology
The Gray Man (2022)	Strange World (Original Motion Picture Soundtrack) (2022)	Extraction 2 (2023)

Strange World (Original Motion Picture Soundtrack) is the score album to the 2022 animated film Strange World produced by Walt Disney Animation Studios. The original score is composed by Henry Jackman in his fifth scoring assignment for Disney film, after Winnie the Pooh (2011), Wreck-It Ralph (2012), Big Hero 6 (2014) and Ralph Breaks the Internet (2018). Jackman referenced most of James Horner and John Williams' electronic and symphony orchestral score for big-budget films, to create a "larger-than-life and fantastical, but organic" score suiting the world. He relied on orchestral music and harmonies, with exception for electronic and synth-infused score in few sequences.

The original soundtrack, consisted the song "They're the Clades!" composed by Jackman, written by Kevin Del Aguila and performed by James Hayden, also having a reprised version of the tracks. Jackman's score accompanied the remainder of the album. It was released by Walt Disney Records on November 23, 2022, the same day as the film and received generally positive response for Jackman's composition.

== Background ==
On September 5, 2022, it was announced that Henry Jackman, composer of Big Hero 6 and the Wreck-It Ralph films, would compose the score for Strange World, marking his third collaboration with Don Hall, after Winnie the Pooh and Big Hero 6, and his fifth overall feature-length scoring work with Walt Disney Animation Studios, which includes the Wreck-It Ralph films.

When Jackman was writing the score for The Gray Man (2022), he discussed with Hall on scoring for Strange World, which he simultaneously began after the former's completion. The score depicted a "fantastical, but organic and not so technological world" and a celebration of "symphony orchestra" which extends the color of the musical score. The orchestra, choir and synth-based electronic music brings the music of Strange World, "a bit like augmented reality". While writing the music, Jackman discussed with Hall on the musical references that inspired the score, including John Williams' score for Star Wars (1977), The Empire Strikes Back (1980) and Raiders of the Lost Ark (1981), where it "corresponds to a certain type of action-adventure, a certain use of committed thematic orchestra". Both Hall and Qui Nguyen had inspired Williams and James Horner's work which are referenced throughout the film. Hall called that "This is my favorite score that he's ever done. It's so much a part of the film and evoking what we wanted to evoke, those adventure films from the eighties. Those were the movies that he kept bringing up and felt like that would influence the sound of Strange World."

He wrote four harmonic portions, that had arranged in a series of arpeggios which was a four-chords sequence, adding that "When I first came out with them, I didn't analyze the harmony, I just wrote them as they came and felt happy with them. And because the four chords themselves were so unusual, when it came to writing a melody, there was only a certain amount of notes that were available to me, and it ended up pushing me into all sorts of unusual dissonances that were still melodic. It felt like beautiful-ish and melodic but also a bit dissonant." Since the theme, were written out of the picture, he wrote it as a three-and-a-half-minute piece cue titled as "Strange World Passacaglia". The arpeggiation of harp strings reminded him of Claude Debussy and Maurice Ravel's composition La mer, as well as the string portions felt like an Austro-Germanic tone poem inspired from Richard Wagner's composition.

As he wrote the cue outside the picture, he used it as the principal leitmotif for the score, which would be used for entities appearing the world. He felt the score is not scary as Alan Silvestri's score for Predator (1987) but odd as a similar to Jerry Goldsmith's Alien (1979) theme. The track "End Credits Suite" is "just every theme in the movie in a swashbuckling, three minute suite". Jackman referenced Williams' Superman theme where "the first thing that happens is you just get a load of swooping credits for about three and a half minutes while John Williams gets to blast through every single tune of "Superman." It's like, we haven't even started yet and we get a full operatic overture." The suite was indeed a "medley of all the themes he had composed", where he added "in this heritage of adventure music, firstly there's incredibly committed thematic material. There's no attempt to sort of be endlessly minimalistic."

Jackman used the 20th-century concert music harmony to produce a "slightly Dagobah system" where "strange and otherworldly harmonies that are much closer to concert music". The Avalonia theme, underlies the Clade family's emotional connection, which Jackman said "is much more the feeling of home and even the instrumentation, there's like a bass player and some guitars and things that. It feels safer and more like home. But you need that as a sort of foil, you need a sense of the safe world before you go on your mad adventure into the unknown." Hence, the first reel of the film, had the theme, which is "more of pop instrumentation and harmony, lesser epic and symphony".

== Track listing ==
All music is composed by Henry Jackman, except as noted.

No.	Title	Length
1.	"They're The Clades!" (written by Kevin Del Aguila; performed by James Hayden)	1:05
2.	"A Conflict of Visions"	3:48
3.	"Avalonia Part I"	1:37
4.	"Avalonia Part II"	1:07
5.	"Searcher's Quest"	2:27
6.	"The Descent"	3:43
7.	"Abundance of Life"	0:56
8.	"Crazy Creatures"	1:19
9.	"Callisto"	1:12
10.	"The Misadventures of Ethan Clade"	2:54
11.	"The Tale of Jaeger Clade"	2:59
12.	"Flesh and Blood"	1:26
13.	"Friend or Foe?"	1:31
14.	"Attack of the Reapers"	3:28
15.	"Voyage to the Heart"	2:08
16.	"Skin in the Game"	2:06
17.	"Flight of the Poot Pickles"	1:27
18.	"Winning Ways"	1:45
19.	"Like Father, Like Son"	1:25
20.	"In My Element"	1:27
21.	"The Heart of Pando"	3:24
22.	"An Eye-Opener"	2:55
23.	"Change of Plan"	1:55
24.	"A Great Effort"	3:11
25.	"The Fate of Strange World"	2:16
26.	"Resurrection"	2:34
27.	"Farewell to Arms"	1:38
28.	"A New Perspective"	2:15
29.	"End Credit Suite"	2:30
30.	"Strange World Overture"	3:45
31.	"They're The Clades! (Reprise)" (written by Kevin Del Aguila; performed by James Hayden)	1:19
Total length:		67:32

== Additional music ==
The track "Family Ties" by Bastille was featured in the special-look trailer; the track was used for promotional purposes, but was not featured in the soundtrack nor in the film. Additionally, "Lone Digger" by Caravan Palace is featured in the film, but it was not included in the soundtrack either.

== Reception ==
Filmtracks.com wrote "though, it's the main strange world theme summarized in 'Strange World Overture' that will tickle the fancy of listeners tired of otherwise effective but mundane children's adventure music. The remaining elements in Strange World are adequate to the task and at times admirable, though the two vocal performances of the Clade theme's song over the opening and closing moments of the film are a tad obnoxious in their intentionally bloated exuberance. Most importantly, Jackman's narrative is extremely well maintained in his themes, and the balance of orchestral and synthetic layers is superb. On the 67-minute, score-only album, a lossless presentation illuminates the intriguing harmonic layers of the strange world theme in ways compressed alternatives cannot. This entry is more intelligent than most of its peers in the genre, a welcome engagement for the mind." Belen Edwards of Mashable wrote "composer Henry Jackman's work tips its dusty fedora to John Williams's classic Indiana Jones theme." Jump Cut Online's "robust musical compositions only adds further to the film's adventurous side". Devansh Sharma of News9Live said "Henry Jackman's soundtrack, however, isn't as memorable as Disney-Pixar films that have scored Oscar wins for their music."

Strange World's score by Jackman is intended to be the possible contender for Academy Award for Best Original Score at the 95th Academy Awards. However, the film's box-office failure might impact the possibilities of further nominations.

== Credits ==
- Score composer and producer: Henry Jackman
- Additional music: Halli Cauthery • Sven Faulconer • Evan Goldman • Antonio Di Iorio • Alex Kovacs
- Music editor: Daniel Pinder
- Assistant music editor: Earl Ghaffari
- Vice president, music production: Andrew Page
- Score recorded and mixed by: Alan Meyerson
- Conducted by: Nick Glenne-Smith
- Orchestrations by: Andrew Kinney • Stephen Coleman • Michael James Lloyd
- Additional orchestrations: Edward Trybek • Henri Wilikinson • Jonathan Beard
- Score production services: Matthew Justmann
- Score contracted by: Peter Rotter
- Choir contracted and conducted by: Jasper Randall
- Music preparation by: Booker White
- Score technical engineers: Maverick Dugger • Joe Cho
- Score mix engineers: Jacob Johnston • Michael Gossard
- Digital score recordists: Larry Mah • Kevin Globerman
- Score mix editor: Jeff Gartenbau
- Scoring crew: Brian Brar • Greg Dennen • Tom Hardisty • Julianne McCormick • Peter Nelson • Ryan Nelson • Jamie Olivera • Assen Stoyanov • Keith Ukrisna • Brian van Leer • Brian Vibberts • Richard Wheeler, Jr.

=== Musicians ===
- Violins: Bruce Dukov - Concertmaster • Alyssa Park - Principal 2nd • Eun-Mee Ahn • Charlie Bisharat • Roberto Cani • Minyoung Chang • Nathan Cole • Nina Evtuhov • Lorenzo Gamma • Molly Rogers • Jessica Guideri • Tamara Hatwan • Amy Hershberger • Luanne Homzy • Ben Jacobson • Maia Jasper-White • Max Karmazyn • Dennis Kim • Ana Landauer • Songa Lee • Natalie Leggett • Philip Levy • Maya Magub • Helen Nightengale • Grace Oh • Joel Pargman • Sara Parkins • Kerenza Peacock • Heather Powell Ludmir • Neil Samples • Teresa Stanislav • Akiko Tarumoto • Josefina Vergara • Shalini Jivayan • Irina Voloshina • Roger Wilkie • Yelena Yegoryan
- Violas: Shawn Mann - Principal • Victor De Almeida • Rob Brophy • Meredith Crawford • Zach Dellinger • Andrew Duckles • Alma L. Fernandez • Matthew Funes • Michael Larco • Luke Maurer • Jonathan Moerschel • Carolyn Riley • David Walther
- Cellos: Steve Erdody - Principal • Helen Z. Altenbach • Jacob Braun • Eric Byers • Ross Gasworth • Dennis Karmazyn • Michael Kauffman • Christine Kim • Vanessa Freebairn-Smith
- Basses: Michael Valerio - Principal • Drew Dembowski • Steven Dress • Oscar Hidalgo • Christian Kollgaard • Geoffrey S. Osika • David Parmeter
- Flutes: Ben Smolen - Principal • Sara Andon • Julie Berkert • Jenni Olson • Amy Tatum
- Oboes: Lara Wickes • Jessica Pearlman • Leslie Reed
- Clarinets: Stuart Clark - Principal • Donald T. Foster • Joshua Ranz • Juan Gallegos Jr.
- Bassoons: Rose Corrigan - Principal • William May • Anthony Parnther • Damian Montano
- French Horns: Dylan S. Hart - Principal • Laura Brenes • David Everson • Adedeji Ongufolu • Jaclyn Rainey • Teag Reaves • Amy Rhine
- Trumpets: Jon Lewis - Principal • Dan Rosenboom • Rob Schaer • Thomas Hooten
- Trombones: Alex Iles - Principal • David Rejano • Craig Gosnell • Steve Holtman • Philip Keen • John Lofton • Bill Reichenbach • Steven Suminski • Steven Trapani
- Tuba: Doug Tornquist
- Harp: JoAnn Turvosky
- Percussion: Wade Culbreath - Principal • Edward Atkatz • Pete Korpela • Alex Acuna
- Timpani: Brian Kilgore
- Guitar: George Doering
- Electric Bass: Anthony Levin
- Piano & Celeste: Robert Theis
- Choir: Lindsay Patterson Abdou • Michael Bannett • Karen Hogle Brown • Amick Byram • Tim Campbell • Callista Hoffman-Campbell • Arnold Livingston Geis • Dylan Gentile • William Kenneth Goldman • Scott Graff • Kelci Hahn • Ayana Haviv • James Hayden • Elissa Johnston • Dermot Kiernan • Shawn Kirchner • Luc Kleiner • Michael Litchenauer • JJ Lopez • Sarah Lynch • Sara Mann • Marijke van Niekerk • Meredith Pyle • Jessica Rotter • Anna Schubert • Jessie Shulman • Mark Edward Smith • Todd Strange • Suzanne Waters • Gerald White • Andrea Zomorodian
