= Hustle (2022 film) =

2022 film by Jeremiah Zagar

- Official release poster
- Directed by: Jeremiah Zagar
- Written by: Taylor Materne; Will Fetters
- Produced by: LeBron James; Maverick Carter; Joe Roth; Joseph Vecsey; Jeff Kirschenbaum; Zack Roth; Adam Sandler; Allen Covert
- Starring: Adam Sandler; Queen Latifah; Juancho Hernangómez; Ben Foster; Kenny Smith; Anthony Edwards; Robert Duvall
- Cinematography: Zak Mulligan
- Edited by: Tom Costain; Brian Robinson; Keiko Deguchi
- Music by: Dan Deacon
- Production companies: Happy Madison Productions; Roth/Kirschenbaum Films; SpringHill Company
- Distributed by: Netflix
- Release dates: June 3, 2022 (theatrical); June 8, 2022 (Netflix)
- Running time: 118 minutes
- Country: United States
- Languages: English; Spanish
- Budget: $21 million

Hustle is a 2022 American sports comedy-drama film directed by Jeremiah Zagar, written by Taylor Materne and Will Fetters, and co-produced by and starring Adam Sandler as a down-on-his-luck National Basketball Association (NBA) scout who discovers a raw but talented basketball player in Spain (Juancho Hernangómez) and tries to prepare him for the NBA draft. The film also stars Queen Latifah, Ben Foster, Robert Duvall, Heidi Gardner, and current NBA player Anthony Edwards. LeBron James produced the film through his SpringHill Company banner.

Hustle was released in select theaters on June 3, 2022, and on Netflix on June 8. The film received critical acclaim from critics, with Sandler's performance singled out for praise. At the 29th Screen Actors Guild Awards, he received a nomination for the Outstanding Performance by a Male Actor in a Leading Role, his first SAG nomination in his career.

== Plot ==
Stanley Sugerman, a jaded international scout for the Philadelphia 76ers of the NBA, lives life on the road searching for future stars. His frequent travel takes a toll on his wife Teresa and daughter Alex. While he is liked by 76ers owner Rex Merrick, he clashes with Rex's son Vincent. Rex promotes Stanley to assistant coach, allowing him to remain at home with his family. The same evening, however, Rex dies, leaving Vince in charge. Three months later, Vince demotes Stanley again to scout, sending him overseas. His former college teammate Leon Rich encourages him to leave the 76ers and also become a player agent. When Stanley's plan to scout a player in Spain falls through, watching a local pick-up game, he is stunned by an incredibly talented unknown player.

Stanley attempts to speak with the man, Bo Cruz, but is rebuffed until he makes a FaceTime call to Dirk Nowitzki to prove his legitimacy. Bo and his mother Paola recount his life story: he was a talented player from an early age and was invited to play in the U.S. at age 15, but stayed in Spain after his girlfriend became pregnant with his daughter Lucia. Bo now works construction and makes extra money hustling at basketball. After an impressive workout with members of the Spanish national team, Stanley urges the 76ers front office to sign Cruz immediately, but Vincent is unconvinced. Taking matters into his own hands, Stanley pays to bring Cruz to the US, telling him he will be signed by the Sixers or enter the NBA draft. At the airport, Bo is detained for an aggravated assault conviction he received in Spain. He is released, but warned that he could be deported if he were to be arrested in the U.S.

Stanley takes Bo to play at a showcase organized by Leon, which is also attended by the presumptive second overall pick Kermit Wilts. Stanley advises Bo that if he successfully defends Wilts, it will significantly raise his stock with the Sixers. During the workout, Cruz shows flashes of talent, but struggles on offense and at guarding Wilts, who trash talks him and throws him off his game. When Vince passes on Bo, Stanley quits the 76ers to prepare Cruz for the NBA Draft Combine six weeks away. Telling Bo his only weakness is his sensitivity, he builds on his mental toughness. Teresa and Alex assist with the training by preparing meals and taping workouts. Bo improves dramatically through Stanley's coaching, but Leon cannot get him into the Draft Combine after Vince spreads information about Bo's assault charge.

Furious at Stanley, Bo eventually reveals the charge stemmed from a fight with Lucia's mother's boyfriend after she tried to claim sole custody of Lucia. Stanley admits his injured hand was from a drunk driving crash while in college, derailing his basketball team's season and putting him in jail for six months. Their trust renewed, Stanley works tirelessly to get Bo into the combine, without success. To create interest, the Sugermans enlist Julius Erving to create a viral video of "the Boa Challenge", where people, including 76ers player Tobias Harris, attempt to score on Bo for money. Cruz is eventually accepted into the combine, and Stanley flies Lucia and Paola to the US to support him. Bo impresses in the physical elements of the combine, but faces off with Wilts again in a five-on-five exhibition game. He initially performs well, but Kermit begins talking trash about Bo's daughter and mother, eventually breaking his composure as he pushes Kermit down the floor. Bo then storms out of the combine.

Thinking that their journey is over, Stanley accompanies Bo to the airport. However, before Bo's plane leaves for Spain, Stanley receives a call from Leon informing about a private game for players and front office members and that Bo and Kermit have both been invited to participate. Playing without pressure, Cruz locks down Wilts defensively and demonstrates his offensive abilities. Rex's daughter Kat, who recognizes Stanley's talent, reveals she is taking over from Vince and rehires him. Five months later, the 76ers and Boston Celtics tip off for a game against each other, with Stanley now the assistant coach of the 76ers and Bo playing for the Celtics.

== Cast ==
- Adam Sandler as Stanley Sugerman, a scout and coach for the 76ers
- Juancho Hernangómez as Bo Cruz, Stanley's basketball player recruit from Spain
  - Silas Graham as young Bo Cruz
- Queen Latifah as Teresa Sugerman, Stanley's wife
- Ben Foster as Vince Merrick, Rex's son and 76ers co-owner
- Robert Duvall as Rex Merrick, Vince's father and 76ers owner
- Jordan Hull as Alex Sugerman, Stanley's daughter
- Heidi Gardner as Kat Merrick, Rex's daughter
- María Botto as Paola Cruz, Bo's mother
- Ainhoa Pillet as Lucia Cruz, Bo's daughter
- Anthony Edwards as Kermit Wilts, a player and rival to Bo
- Kenny Smith as Leon Rich, a sports agent and Stanley's friend
- Jaleel White as Blake
- Jerry Lobrow as Sports Agent

Longtime Villanova head coach Jay Wright along with other at-the-time current and former NBA players and coaches portray themselves or other characters. Trae Young, Jordan Clarkson, Khris Middleton, Aaron Gordon, Kyle Lowry, Seth Curry, Luka Dončić, Tobias Harris, Tyrese Maxey, Matisse Thybulle, Aaron McKie, Julius Erving, Charles Barkley, Shaquille O'Neal, Allen Iverson, Dirk Nowitzki, Brad Stevens, Doc Rivers, Dave Joerger, Mark Jackson, Sergio Scariolo, José Calderón, Leandro Barbosa, Álex Abrines and Maurice Cheeks portray themselves, while Boban Marjanović plays the "Big Serbian" and Moritz Wagner as the German "Haas". Street ball legends Grayson "The Professor" Boucher, Larry "Bone Collector" Williams, and Waliyy "Main Event" Dixon appear. Felipe Reyes, Pierre Oriola and Juancho's brother Willy Hernangómez appear as members of the Spanish national team. Local Philadelphia journalist Anthony Gargano plays himself and Philadelphia rapper Tierra Whack plays herself.

== Production ==
In February 2018, Legendary Entertainment won the rights to the script by Taylor Materne in a bidding war with a six-figure sale. Dave Meyers was attached to direct.

In May 2020, Adam Sandler joined the cast of the film, with Jeremiah Zagar replacing Meyers as director and Netflix buying the rights from Legendary. Sandler had seen Zagar's 2018 narrative feature debut We the Animals, and asked him to take a look at the script for Hustle. Zagar was initially hesitant, before becoming intrigued at the idea of shooting basketball in a cinematic way and signing on to the project.

In September 2020, Queen Latifah announced she had joined the cast of the film. In October 2020, Robert Duvall, Ben Foster, Juancho Hernangómez, Jordan Hull, María Botto, Ainhoa Pillet, Kenny Smith, and Kyle Lowry joined the cast of the film.

Filming began in Philadelphia in October 2020, and continued at the Coatesville Area High School in Pennsylvania. Many Philadelphia school, college, and university buildings were filming locations, including Tom Gola Arena at La Salle University, where the combine scene was filmed, and the Liacouras Center at Temple University, where Sandler's character is depicted playing college basketball. Multiple scenes were filmed in Center City, Philadelphia, including on Market Street and the Italian Market, as well as in Manayunk and South Philadelphia. Additional filming took place in Camden, New Jersey, and in Wells Fargo Center on January 14, 2022, where the Celtics and 76ers played against each other in a regulated NBA game.

== Reception ==
=== Audience viewership ===
Hustle was released in select theaters June 3, 2022, and worldwide on Netflix on June 8. According to Netflix, it was the platform's most-viewed film between June 8–19.

=== Critical response ===
On review aggregator Rotten Tomatoes, the film has an approval rating of 94% based on 174 reviews, with an average rating of 7.2/10. It is the highest rated film made by Happy Madison Productions on the website. The website's consensus reads, "Hustle doesn't have any fancy moves, but it doesn't need them—Adam Sandler's everyman charm makes this easy layup fun to watch." Metacritic, which uses a weighted average, assigned the film a score of 68 out of 100, based on 41 critics, indicating "generally favorable" reviews.

Sandler's performance was singled out for praise. For ABC News, critic Peter Travers wrote: "It's always a slam dunk when Adam Sandler drops his doofus routine and really acts. And here, as a basketball scout who yearns to coach, he infuses every frame of this formulaic crowd-pleaser with a real-deal love of the game. Hot damn! We have a winner." Owen Gleiberman felt Sandler "plays Stanley with an inner sadness, a blend of weariness and resilience, and a stubborn faith in the game that leaves you moved, stoked, and utterly convinced." Robert Daniels for Polygon praised Sandler's "stunning, often unlikely intimacy", called Hernangómez "captivating", and complimented the filmmaking showcasing the basketball play, but felt the writers "struggle to develop their characters".

Nina Metz of the Chicago Tribune was critical of the script, stating, "There aren't really any characters, it's kind of remarkable. It's a film that doesn't even rely on archetypes, it simply populates the screen with people, some of whom occasionally say things."

=== Accolades ===
Award	Date of ceremony	Category	Recipient(s)	Result	Ref.
People's Choice Awards	December 6, 2022	The Comedy Movie of 2022	Hustle	Nominated	
People's Choice Awards	December 6, 2022	The Comedy Movie Star of 2022	Adam Sandler	Won	
People's Choice Awards	December 6, 2022	The Comedy Movie Star of 2022	Queen Latifah	Nominated	
People's Choice Awards	December 6, 2022	The Female Movie Star of 2022	Queen Latifah	Nominated	
Indiana Film Journalists Association	December 19, 2022	Best Lead Performance	Adam Sandler	Nominated	
Indiana Film Journalists Association	December 19, 2022	Best Musical Score	Dan Deacon	Nominated	
Indiana Film Journalists Association	December 19, 2022	Best Editing	Tom Costain, Brian M. Robinson, Keiko Deguchi	Nominated	
AARP Movies for Grownups Awards	January 28, 2023	Best Actor	Adam Sandler	Nominated	
Satellite Awards	February 11, 2023	Best Actor in a Motion Picture – Comedy or Musical	Adam Sandler	Nominated	
Screen Actors Guild Awards	February 26, 2023	Outstanding Performance by a Male Actor in a Leading Role	Adam Sandler	Nominated	

== See also ==
- List of basketball films
