= Anthony Keyvan =

American actor (born 2000)

- Born: August 13, 2000 (age 26); Long Beach, California, U.S.
- Occupation: Actor
- Years active: 2008–present

Anthony Keyvan (born August 13, 2000) is an American actor. He is best known for his roles in Love, Victor (2021), XO, Kitty (2023) and The Rookie.

== Early life ==
Keyvan was born on August 13, 2000, in Long Beach, California, to an Iranian father and Filipina mother.

== Filmography ==
=== Film ===
Year	Title	Role	Notes
2010	The Space Between	Omar Hassan	
TBA	Just Picture It	TBA	Post-production
TBA	Goodbye Girl	Buck	Post-production

=== Television ===
Year	Title	Role	Notes
2009	Lost	Young Sayid Jarrah	Episode: "He's Our You"
2010	iCarly	Jake	Episode: "iSell Penny Tees"
2011	Grey's Anatomy	Miguel Aranda	Episode: "I Will Survive"
2011	In Plain Sight	Vikram Kumar	Episode: "Kumar vs Kumar"
2011	Law & Order: Special Victims Unit	Arturo Rivera	Episode: "Blood Brothers"
2012	Necessary Roughness	Mukesh Jeevan	Episode: "Spell It Out"
2013	Twisted	Danny	Guest role
2013	Once Upon a Time in Wonderland	Young Jafar	Cameo
2014	Bad Teacher	Parker	Guest role
2015	NCIS: Naval Criminal Investigative Service	Elan Ghorbani	Episode: "Neverland"
2015	Bella and the Bulldogs	Tanner	Episode: "Third Degree Ba-Burn"
2015	Fresh Off the Boat	Chris	Guest role
2017	Major Crimes	Lucas Garza	Guest role
2018	Alexa & Katie	Nathan	Guest role
2019	Schooled	Don	Episode: "Lainey's All That"
2021	The Rookie	Diego de La Cruz	Recurring role
2021	Generation	Pablo	Guest role
2021	Love, Victor	Rahim	Main role
2023	XO, Kitty	Quincy "Q" Shabazian	Main role
2026	Chicago Med	Quentin Khani	Episode: "Spill Your Guts"
