= Just Picture It =

- Directed by: Lee Toland Krieger
- Written by: Jesse Lasky
- Produced by: Joe Roth; Jeff Kirschenbaum; Millie Bobby Brown; Robert Brown
- Starring: Millie Bobby Brown; Gabriel LaBelle; Anthony Keyvan; Amrit Kaur; Julian Dennison; Brec Bassinger; Idina Menzel; Margo Martindale
- Cinematography: David Lanzenberg
- Production companies: RK Films; PCMA Productions
- Distributed by: Netflix
- Country: United States
- Language: English

Just Picture It is an upcoming American romantic comedy film directed by Lee Toland Krieger and written by Jesse Lasky. It stars Millie Bobby Brown, Gabriel LaBelle, Anthony Keyvan, Amrit Kaur, Julian Dennison, Brec Bassinger, Idina Menzel, and Margo Martindale.

== Premise ==
Two college students are surprised when their phones glitch and start showing them pictures from 10 years in the future as a happily married couple with kids.

== Cast ==
- Millie Bobby Brown as Bea
- Gabriel LaBelle as Sam
- Anthony Keyvan
- Amrit Kaur
- Julian Dennison
- Ben Jackson Walker
- Brec Bassinger
- Idina Menzel
- Margo Martindale

== Production ==
In July 2025, it was announced that Lee Toland Krieger was directing a romantic comedy film starring Millie Bobby Brown and Gabriel LaBelle for Netflix. Brown also serves as a producer and developed the project from its inception.

Principal photography began in September 2025 in Georgia, with Anthony Keyvan, Amrit Kaur, Julian Dennison, Ben Jackson Walker, Brec Bassinger, Idina Menzel, and Margo Martindale joining the cast.
