= Jeff Kirschenbaum =

American film producer

Jeff Kirschenbaum is an American film producer and member of the Producers Guild of America. He is known for collaborating with Joe Roth.

== Filmography ==
He was a producer in all films unless otherwise noted.

=== Film ===
Year	Film	Notes
2017	XXX: Return of Xander Cage	
2019	Maleficent: Mistress of Evil	Executive producer
2020	Dolittle	
2021	The United States vs. Billie Holiday	
2021	F9	
2022	Hustle	
2022	The Gray Man	
2022	The School for Good and Evil	
2023	Fast X	
2023	Anyone but You	co-produced with Will Gluck, Joe Roth
2024	Damsel	
2024	A Family Affair	
2024	Jackpot!	
TBA	Just Picture It	

Miscellaneous crew

Year	Film	Role
1999	The General's Daughter	Production assistant

=== Television ===
Year	Title	Credit
2010	Bakugan Battle Brawlers	Production executive
2020	The Plot Against America	Executive producer
2021	Panic	Executive producer
