= Joe Roth =

American film executive, producer, and director

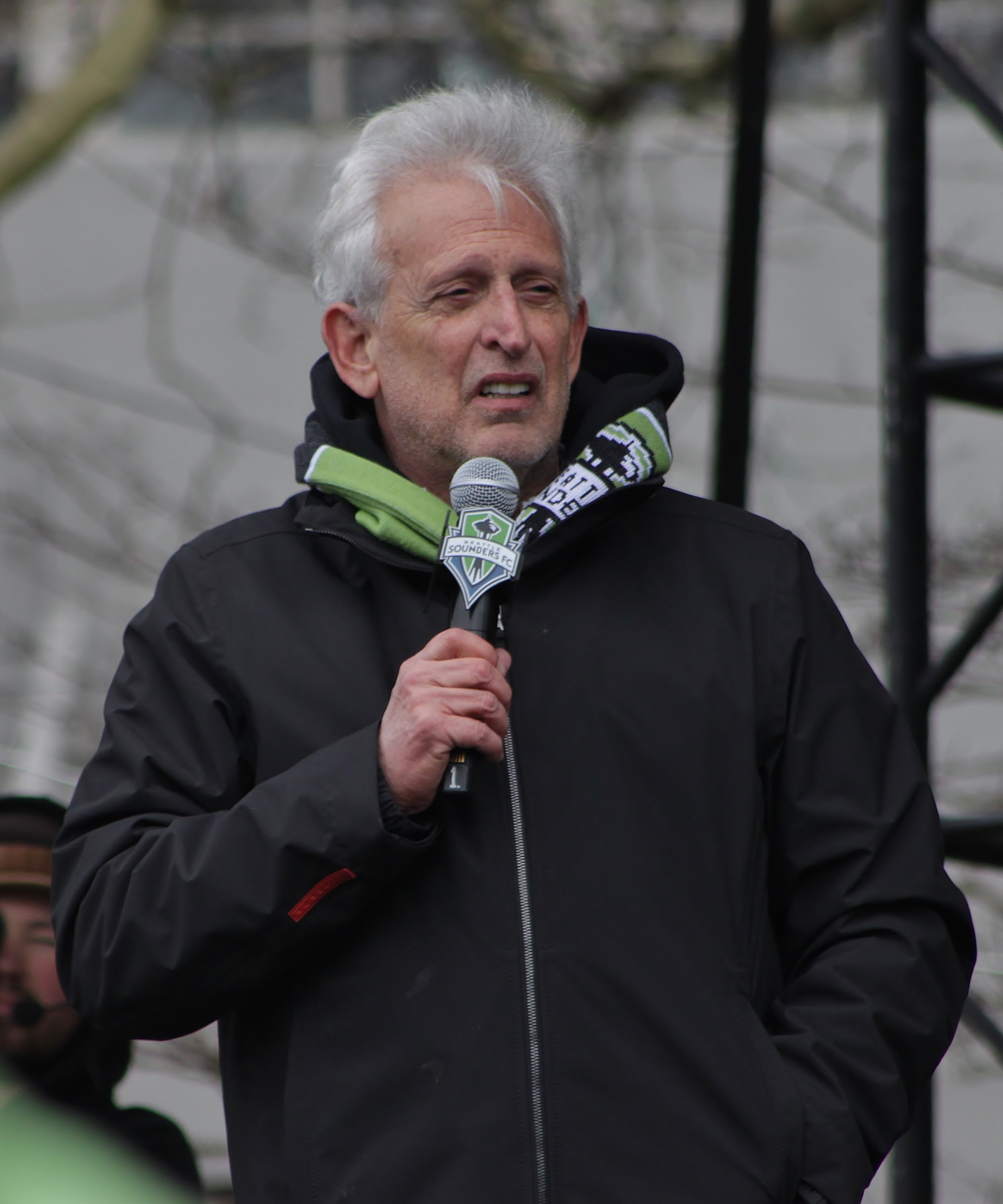
- Roth in December 2016
- Born: Joseph Emanuel Roth; June 13, 1948 (age 78); New York City, New York, U.S.
- Occupations: Film producer; film director; studio executive
- Years active: 1974–present
- Spouses: Donna Arkoff (m. 1980; div. 2004) Irene Oh (m. 2006)
- Children: 3

Joseph Emanuel Roth (born June 13, 1948) is an American film executive, producer and director. He co-founded Morgan Creek Entertainment in 1988 and was chairman of 20th Century Fox (1989–1993), Caravan Pictures (1993–1994), and Walt Disney Studios (1994–2000) before founding Revolution Studios in 2000, then Roth/Kirschenbaum Films in 2007.

== Early life ==
Roth was born on June 13, 1948 to Frances and Lawrence Roth. He grew up in New Hyde Park, Long Island, New York. In 1959, Roth's father volunteered Joe and his brother Daniel to be plaintiffs in a case against the New York State Board of Regents, as part of the ACLU's nationwide effort to abolish mandatory prayer in public schools. The case went through several appeals, finally reaching the U.S. Supreme Court in 1962. The Court ruled that such prayer was unconstitutional under the First Amendment, in the landmark case of Engel v. Vitale. Roth has stated that his Jewish family faced various forms of harassment. This involved incidents like "a cross being burned on the lawn and some of Roth's schoolmates crossed themselves before they would speak to him."

Roth attended Boston University, graduating in 1970 with a bachelor's degree in communication.

== Career ==
Over the course of his career, he has produced over 40 films, and has directed six to date, including 1990's Coupe de Ville, 2001's America's Sweethearts and 2006's Freedomland.

In 1988 by Roth and James Robinson co-founded Morgan Creek Entertainment. The name came from Roth's favorite film, The Miracle of Morgan's Creek. The company had box-office hits including Young Guns and Major League.

In 1989, Roth became chairman of 20th Century Fox, who were very successful under him, including hits Home Alone, Die Hard 2 and White Men Can't Jump. His contract expired in July 1992 but he agreed to stay on as Fox Inc. chairman Barry Diller had quit earlier in the year. He later announced in November 1992 that he was leaving Fox to set up an independent production company at The Walt Disney Studios.

In 1992, he co-founded Caravan Pictures with Roger Birnbaum, which had a production deal with The Walt Disney Studios. Roth moved on to be Disney studio chief on August 24, 1994. Disney CEO Michael Eisner was so set on replacing Jeffrey Katzenberg as Disney studio chief with Roth that he forgave the $15 million cost overrun debt for I Love Trouble and paid Roth $40 million of fees for 21 unproduced films under the deal.

Roth, who was ranked 6th in Premiere Magazine's 2003 Hollywood Power List, produced the 76th annual Academy Awards. Roth announced in October 2007 that, when Revolution's distribution deal with Sony Pictures ended, that he would depart from Revolution Studios to form his own production company, Roth Films.

On November 13, 2007, Roth was introduced as the majority owner of a Seattle, Washington–based Major League Soccer franchise along with Paul Allen. Seattle Sounders FC—which calls Lumen Field home—began regular season play in 2009. On November 12, 2015, Roth passed on majority ownership to Adrian Hanauer.

== Personal life ==
Roth was married to Donna Arkoff whose father was movie producer Samuel Z. Arkoff. They have three children.

The family resided in the Dolores del Río House, designed by architect Douglas Honnold for Irish production designer Cedric Gibbons and Mexican actress Dolores del Río in 1929 in Pacific Palisades, Los Angeles, California. In 2021, Roth paid $23 million for a 5,514 sq ft (512.3 m^{2}), 1960s Midcentury home designed by Dan Dworsky and renovated by Waldo Fernandez in Beverly Hills.

== Filmography ==
=== Film ===
Producer

- Tunnel Vision (1976)
- Our Winning Season (1978)
- Americathon (1979)
- Ladies and Gentlemen, The Fabulous Stains (1982)
- The Final Terror (1983)
- The Stone Boy (1984)
- Moving Violations (1985)
- Where the River Runs Black (1986)
- Streets of Gold (1986)
- P.K. and the Kid (1987)
- Young Guns (1988)
- The Three Musketeers (1993)
- Angels in the Outfield (1994)
- A Low Down Dirty Shame (1994)
- Houseguest (1995)
- The Jerky Boys: The Movie (1995)
- Heavyweights (1995)
- Tall Tale (1995)
- While You Were Sleeping (1995)
- The Forgotten (2004)
- The Great Debaters (2007)
- Alice in Wonderland (2010)
- Snow White and the Huntsman (2012)
- Oz the Great and Powerful (2013)
- Heaven Is for Real (2014)
- Million Dollar Arm (2014)
- Maleficent (2014)
- In the Heart of the Sea (2015)
- Miracles from Heaven (2016)
- The Huntsman: Winter's War (2016)
- Alice Through the Looking Glass (2016)
- XXX: Return of Xander Cage (2017)
- Maleficent: Mistress of Evil (2019)
- Dolittle (2020)
- The United States vs. Billie Holiday (2021)
- F9 (2021)
- Hustle (2022)
- The Gray Man (2022)
- The School for Good and Evil (2022)
- Anyone but You (2023)
- Damsel (2024)
- A Family Affair (2024)
- Jackpot! (2024)
- Just Picture It (TBA)

Executive producer

- Cracking Up (1977)
- Bachelor Party (1984)
- Revenge of the Nerds II: Nerds in Paradise (1987)
- Dead Ringers (1988) (Uncredited)
- Skin Deep (1989)
- Renegades (1989)
- Enemies, A Love Story (1989)
- Young Guns II (1990)
- The Exorcist III (1990)
- Pacific Heights (1990)
- Angie (1994)
- Before and After (1996)
- Tears of the Sun (2003)
- Daddy Day Care (2003)
- Hollywood Homicide (2003)
- Mona Lisa Smile (2003)
- An Unfinished Life (2005)
- Little Man (2006) (Uncredited)
- Knight and Day (2010)
- Sabotage (2014)
- The Exorcist III: Legion (2016)
- The Dreaming Man (2017)

Co-producer

- Off Beat (1986)
- Major League (1989)
- Nightbreed (1990)

Director

- Streets of Gold (1986)
- Revenge of the Nerds II: Nerds in Paradise (1987)
- Coupe de Ville (1990)
- America's Sweethearts (2001)
- Christmas with the Kranks (2004)
- Freedomland (2006)

Miscellaneous crew

Year	Film	Role	Notes
1974	The Conversation	Production assistant	Uncredited
1988	Young Guns	Presenter	
1988	Dead Ringers	Presenter	
1990	The Exorcist III	Presenter	

As an actor

Year	Film	Role	Notes
1976	Tunnel Vision	Player-Announcer	
1977	Cracking Up	Man	Uncredited

Production manager

Year	Film	Role	Notes
1998	Armageddon	Executive in charge of production	Uncredited

Thanks

Year	Film	Role
1995	Dead Presidents	Special thanks
2002	Punch-Drunk Love	Special thanks
2002	Gangs of New York	Special thanks
2009	Bandslam	Thanks

=== Television ===
Producer

Year	Title	Notes
2004	76th Academy Awards	Television special

Executive producer

Year	Title	Notes
2007	Demons	TV movie
2011	Drew Carey's Improv-A-Ganza	
2010–12	Are We There Yet?	
2012–14	Anger Management	
2019	This Is Football	Documentary
2020	The Plot Against America	
2021	Panic	

Thanks

Year	Title	Role	Notes
1990	American Masters	Special thanks	Documentary
2020	The Last Dance	Special thanks	Documentary
