= Sunshine (Liam Payne song) =

Song by Liam Payne

Single by Liam Payne

from the album Ron's Gone Wrong (Original Motion Picture Soundtrack)
- Released: 27 August 2021
- Genre: Pop
- Length: 2:44
- Label: Capitol Records
- Songwriters: Liam Payne; Savan Kotecha; Carl Falk; Albin Nedler
- Producers: Carl Falk; Albin Nedler

Liam Payne singles chronology
"Naughty List" (2020)	"Sunshine" (2021)	"Teardrops" (2024)

Music video
- "Sunshine" on YouTube

"Sunshine" is a song by English singer-songwriter Liam Payne for the 2021 20th Century Studios and Locksmith Animation film Ron's Gone Wrong. It was released as a single on 27 August 2021 by Capitol Records. The song has amassed 15 million streams as of October 2021.

== Background ==
On 19 August 2021, Liam Payne on Instagram wrote: "I am so excited to officially announce that my new single 'Sunshine' is out 27th August and that it's featured in the upcoming @ronsgonewrongmovie!!". Payne also stated that working with Disney was a "dream come true". On 23 September 2021, Payne released a remix "Sunshine" by Billen Ted, and an acoustic version of the song was released on 22 October 2021. Payne performed the song live on Good Morning America on 14 October 2021.

== Composition ==
"Sunshine" was written by Liam Payne, Savan Kotecha, Carl Falk and Albin Nedler, while production was handled by Falk and Nedler. The track runs at 107 BPM and is in the key of A-sharp minor. Speaking about writing the song for the film, Payne stated;

"It was a little bit of a different experience. We kind of had all the melodies and stuff done first and, as we knew we were writing a song for kids, one of the kids of one of the writers came into the room and we asked 'what did you think of the song?' And he was like 'I really like the song, I just wish it had more sunshine in it' and that's where the title came from."

== Music video ==
The music video for "Sunshine" features Liam Payne in a film-themed set as well as all-new film footage. In the video, Payne interacts with a chicken while animated scenes from Ron's Gone Wrong feature main character Barney Pudowski, interacting with his malfunctioning B-bot Ron.

== Track listing ==
Digital download
No.	Title	Length
1.	"Sunshine"	2:44

Billen Ted Remix
No.	Title	Length
1.	"Sunshine" (Billen Ted Remix)	2:55
2.	"Sunshine"	2:44

12" vinyl
No.	Title	Length
1.	"Sunshine"	2:44
2.	"Sunshine" (Instrumental)	2:44

== Personnel ==
Credits for "Sunshine" adapted from AllMusic.

=== Musicians ===
- Liam Payne – lead vocals
- Temu Bacot – backing vocals
- Carl Falk – guitar, bass guitar and keyboards
- Matt Flynn – clapping, drums and percussion
- Jimmy V – clapping and guitar
- Philip Krohnengold – keyboards
- Albin Nedler – keyboards and backing vocals
- Noah Passovoy – clapping

=== Production ===
- Liam Payne – writer and performer
- John Armstrong – assistant engineer
- Deewaan – engineering
- Carl Falk – writer, producer and programming
- Serban Ghenea – audio engineer and mixer
- John Hanes – audio engineer
- Savan Kotetcha – writer
- Randy Merrill – mastering engineer
- Albin Nedler – writer, producer and programming
- Noah Passovoy – engineering

== Charts ==
Chart performance for "Sunshine"
Chart (2021–22)	Peak position
Netherlands (Dutch Top 40 Tiparade)	23
Portugal (AFP)	76
UK Singles Downloads (Official Charts)	80
Venezuela Top Anglo (Record Report)	30

== Release history ==
Release dates and formats for "Sunshine"
Region	Version	Date	Format	Label
Various	Original	27 August 2021	Digital download	Capitol Records
Various	Remixes	24 September 2021	Digital download	Capitol Records
Italy	Original	3 September 2021	Radio airplay	Universal Music Group
Europe	Original	15 October 2021	Vinyl	Capitol Records
