= On Target (Greaney novel) =

2010 thriller novel by Mark Greaney

- Reissue cover
- Author: Mark Greaney
- Audio read by: Jay Snyder
- Language: English
- Series: The Gray Man
- Release number: 2
- Genre: Thriller
- Publisher: Jove Books
- Publication date: September 28, 2010
- Publication place: United States
- Media type: Print (paperback)
- Pages: 544
- ISBN: 978-0-515-14845-9
- Preceded by: The Gray Man
- Followed by: Ballistic

On Target is an action thriller novel by Mark Greaney, published on September 28, 2010, by Jove Books. It is the second book in the Gray Man series, featuring assassin and former CIA operative Court Gentry. It was preceded by The Gray Man and followed by Ballistic. The novel follows Gentry as he is tasked with apprehending the president of Sudan by both his Russian handler and his former CIA employers.

== Plot ==
In Dublin, Ireland, Court Gentry is tasked by his new handler, Russian mob boss Gregor Sidorenko, with assassinating Irish hitman Dougal Slattery. Upon being cornered, Slattery tells Gentry that Sidorenko had ordered the hit to take his place in the Russian's crime syndicate. After asking him to financially provide for his son, Gentry kills him.

Gentry meets Sidorenko in Saint Petersburg, Russia. The Russian offers him a new job: assassinating Sudanese president Bakri Ali Abboud. Sidorenko explains that the Russian government wanted him dead in order for them to drill newly discovered oil in the war-torn Darfur region instead of the Chinese, whom Abboud had given mineral rights to the area.

While considering the job, Gentry is ambushed by a CIA paramilitary unit led by his former team leader Zack Hightower. He convinces Court to take the Sudan job under orders from CIA's director of clandestine services Denny Carmichael except to render Abboud to the International Criminal Court (ICC), in exchange for relinquishing the shoot-on-sight directive against Gentry and offering contract work with the CIA. Gentry goes back to Sidorenko and accepts the job.

Gentry rides in a Russian plane transporting weapons to Khartoum, Sudan, but is diverted to Al-Fashir further east. ICC special investigator Ellen Walsh tries to find evidence of the plane violating weapons sanctions in Sudan, but Gentry turns her in to Sudanese intelligence (NSS) for disrupting his mission. However, he changes his mind and breaks her out of an NSS convoy transporting her to a detention facility.

Court and Ellen pass through the Sahel desert, where they hitch a ride with an Italian non-governmental organization transporting relief goods to Dirra up north. Ellen introduces herself to the NGO owner, causing the NSS to send a group of Janjaweed militia to capture and kill the convoy. Court rigs a makeshift truck bomb as a diversion, killing the Janjaweed men. Court and Ellen continue on horseback to Dirra, where they part ways.

Gentry goes back to Al-Fashir and informs Sidorenko and Hightower about the detour. He then boards another Russian plane and parachutes to Suakin near the Red Sea, where he meets Hightower and his team. The next day, Abboud arrives at the town square with the Sudanese military. They discover Hightower's men, who open fire. The president and his bodyguards retreat to a nearby bank, where Court waits. He snatches Abboud and escapes from the town square as Hightower and his men come under heavy fire from the military.

After stashing the president in a safe place, Gentry goes back to the town square to rescue Hightower's team, which had lost two men. While waiting for exfiltration from Sudan, Hightower informs Gentry that Carmichael had aborted the operation to capture Abboud due to Chinese casualties from the earlier battle, which would have jeopardized an incoming trade deal between China and the US. Realizing that Abboud's death would start a proxy war between the Russians and the Chinese in Sudan, Gentry disobeys Hightower's orders and decides to bring the president to the ICC.

After informing Ellen about Abboud, Court and the president move to the Red Sea coastline, where Hightower kills Abboud with a sniper rifle. Distraught, Gentry later tracks him down to a yacht in the Red Sea, wounded after a gunfight with the Sudanese authorities. Gentry and Hightower evade the Sudanese coast guard by escaping in a mini sub; they are rescued by an asset of Gentry's former handler Sir Donald Fitzroy and later part ways.

Two weeks later, Gentry tracks down the pilot of the Russian plane he had ridden to Sudan in Caracas, Venezuela. He tells him at gunpoint to inform the ICC about the Russian government's involvement in Abboud's assassination through Ellen. Gentry then calls Fitzroy, who warns him to lay low as the CIA, the FSB, and Sidorenko are hunting for him.

== Characters ==
- Courtland "Court" Gentry: aka the Gray Man, aka Sierra Six, aka Violator; the former CIA Special Activities Division (Ground Branch) paramilitary operations officer; the former operative of the CIA's Autonomous Asset Development Program
- Zack Hightower: aka Sierra One; CIA Special Activities Division (Ground Branch) paramilitary operations officer, Whiskey Sierra
- Brad: aka Sierra Two; CIA Special Activities Division (Ground Branch) paramilitary operations officer, Whiskey Sierra
- Dan: aka Sierra Three; CIA Special Activities Division (Ground Branch) paramilitary operations officer, Whiskey Sierra
- Milo: aka Sierra Four; CIA Special Activities Division (Ground Branch) paramilitary operations officer, Whiskey Sierra
- Spencer: aka Sierra Five; CIA Special Activities Division (Ground Branch) paramilitary operations officer, Whiskey Sierra
- Denny Carmichael: The director of National Clandestine Service, CIA; the former head of CIA Special Activities Division
- Gregor Ivanovic Sidorenko: The Russian mob boss
- Bakri Ali Abboud: The President of Sudan
- Ellen Walsh: The special investigator, International Criminal Court
- Mario Bianchi: The owner, Speranza Internazionale (SI)
- Gennady Orloff: The Il-76 senior pilot, Rosoboronexport
- Dougal Slattery: An Irish hitman

== Development ==
The novel's original title was Killer of Men. In an interview with the Memphis Flyer, Greaney compared On Target to The Gray Man: "It gets a little more introspective, more into the character of Court Gentry, his back story. The hero runs into people from his past." Gentry's addiction to painkillers was based on his own experience: "I'm a guy who went through several back surgeries. I had a whole bunch of pain medicine, and I definitely took 'em when I hurt. It's no joke. I went through a lot physically for a couple years, so I can totally relate."

== Critical reception ==
Publishers Weekly reviewed the book: "What could have been a storm of clichés becomes an action-filled yet touching story of a man whose reason has long ago been subsumed by his work ethic."
