= The Gray Man (novel) =

2009 thriller novel by Mark Greaney

- Reissue cover
- Author: Mark Greaney
- Audio read by: Jay Snyder
- Language: English
- Series: The Gray Man
- Release number: 1
- Genre: Thriller
- Publisher: Jove Books
- Publication date: September 29, 2009
- Publication place: United States
- Media type: Print (paperback)
- Pages: 464
- ISBN: 978-0-515-14701-8
- Followed by: On Target

The Gray Man is the debut novel by Mark Greaney, published on September 29, 2009 by Jove Books. It is also the first book in the Gray Man series, featuring assassin and former CIA operative Court Gentry, and was followed by On Target. The book follows Gentry on the run from a former CIA officer who wants him dead in order to safeguard his client's interests in Nigeria.

It was adapted into a film in 2022, starring Ryan Gosling as the title character.

== Plot ==
Court Gentry, known as the Gray Man, assassinates the Nigerian minister of energy in Syria. Escaping into nearby Iraq, he rescues the lone survivor of a U.S. Army Chinook helicopter shot down by local Al-Qaeda forces.

Gentry's handler Sir Donald Fitzroy is visited by Lloyd, a lawyer and former CIA officer working for the French conglomerate LaurentGroup, at his office in London. Lloyd demands that Fitzroy eliminate Gentry for killing the energy minister, a condition set by the Nigerian president (who is the minister's brother) before signing a contract with LaurentGroup to commence natural gas operations in his country. To ensure his compliance, Lloyd has Fitzroy's son, daughter-in-law, and twin granddaughters kidnapped and taken to a château in Normandy, France.

Fitzroy reluctantly orders Gentry's exfiltration team to kill him, but he manages to kill them all. Gentry then goes to nearby Turkey and boards a flight to Prague, Czech Republic. He identifies and kills an Albanian hit squad, one of twelve sent by Lloyd from around the world to eliminate him for a $20 million bounty. Gentry calls Fitzroy, who tells him that the Nigerians had kidnapped his family. Gentry decides to go to Normandy and rescue them.

Gentry makes a stop at Budapest, Hungary to obtain a forged passport from counterfeiter Laszlo Szabo, who had crossed paths with Gentry when he was part of a CIA paramilitary team. Szabo betrays him to the CIA, who had issued a shoot-on-sight directive on Gentry four years ago. He then demands a ransom from Fitzroy as Lloyd sends in an Indonesian hit squad. Gentry manages to escape from Szabo's trap as a CIA paramilitary team gets into a gunfight with the Indonesians, with Szabo killed in the crossfire.

Gentry next goes to a weapons cache in the mountains of Guarda, Switzerland known only to him and Fitzroy, but flees empty handed after an attack by a Libyan hit squad. Now aware that his handler had betrayed him, Lloyd threatens to release classified files on Gentry and his former CIA paramilitary colleagues unless he continues to Normandy. Court then takes a train to nearby Geneva, but he is arrested by local police for the attack at Guarda. A Venezuelan hit squad opens fire on the police, allowing Gentry to escape.

Gentry continues on foot to Geneva and meets with his former CIA instructor Maurice, who provides him with weapons and a car. He escapes just as a South African hit squad enters the house and corners Maurice, who sets off a gas explosion killing them all. Meanwhile, Fitzroy's son was killed after trying to chase one of his daughters who had tried to escape the chateau. LaurentGroup official Kurt Riegel, who had gathered the hit squads together in the hunt for Gentry, arrives in Normandy to salvage the operation.

Gentry arrives in Paris, France, where Riegel had summoned the rest of the hit teams. He is stabbed by a South Korean assassin, whom he later kills after a struggle, and jumps into the Seine River. Gentry makes contact with one of Fitzroy's French contacts, who hastily treats his injuries as he drives to Normandy. Gentry infiltrates the château, battling the remaining hit squads as the deadline for his capture passes and the Nigerian president signs the natural gas contract with LaurentGroup's competitor. He destroys the CIA personnel files and rescues Fitzroy and his family. He is cornered by Lloyd, who is then shot dead by Riegel. Riegel's boss Marc Laurent arrives at the château and offers Gentry a job: assassinating the Nigerian president.

== Development ==
Greaney previously worked as a waiter and bartender for ten years, then later in a surgical technology company, while working on two novels in his spare time. After finishing one of them, titled Goon Squad and was primarily about the aftermath of the Bosnian civil war, he gave the first 20 pages of his work to his favorite author Ralph Peters's agent, Scott Miller, in a book conference in September 2006. Miller liked the book but later did not go forward with it, saying that "it was unmarketable," according to Greaney. But he urged Greaney to write another one based from a character in Goon Squad named Court Gentry, which would later be The Gray Man. After finishing this novel, Miller agreed to represent him, and later found a publisher, Jove Books.

== Critical reception ==
Publishers Weekly reviewed the book: "Cinematic battles and escapes fill out the simplistic but satisfying plot, and Greaney deftly provides small details to show Gentry's human side, offset by the petty rivalries and greed of his enemies."

== Film adaptation ==
There have been several attempts to adapt The Gray Man into a film. Shine Group and New Regency Productions first optioned the book's film rights before its publication in 2009, with Adam Cozad later hired to write the screenplay and James Gray to direct. Brad Pitt was later in talks to star as the Gray Man.

Christopher McQuarrie was later attached to direct in 2016. After that version fell through, the project lay dormant until July 2020, when Netflix announced their plans to adapt it. Eventually it was directed by Joe and Anthony Russo, with Joe Russo also writing the screenplay, and Christopher Markus and Stephen McFeely performing a re-write. Starring Ryan Gosling, Chris Evans, Ana de Armas, Dhanush, Wagner Moura, Julia Butters, and Jessica Henwick, filming commenced in 2021 on a $200 million budget. It was released on July 22, 2022, with some differences from the novel.

Greaney said he is "extraordinarily satisfied" with the movie, adding: "The promises made to me by the Russo brothers, they absolutely lived up to everything they said they were going to do, which I didn't expect. They capture the heart and the soul of the story."
