= Damsel (2024 film) =

Film by Juan Carlos Fresnadillo

- Film poster
- Directed by: Juan Carlos Fresnadillo
- Written by: Dan Mazeau
- Produced by: Joe Roth; Jeff Kirschenbaum; Chris Castaldi
- Starring: Millie Bobby Brown; Ray Winstone; Nick Robinson; Shohreh Aghdashloo; Angela Bassett; Robin Wright
- Cinematography: Larry Fong
- Edited by: John Gilbert
- Music by: David Fleming
- Production company: Roth/Kirschenbaum Films
- Distributed by: Netflix
- Release date: March 8, 2024
- Running time: 110 minutes
- Country: United States
- Language: English
- Budget: $145.1 million (gross); $109.2 million (net)

Damsel is a 2024 American dark fantasy film directed by Juan Carlos Fresnadillo and written by Dan Mazeau. Millie Bobby Brown stars as Elodie, a young woman who accepts a marriage proposal only to realize that she is being used to repay a royal family's ancient debts and must now escape while surviving attacks from the dragon lurking in the chasm. The rest of the principal cast consists of Ray Winstone, Nick Robinson, Shohreh Aghdashloo, Angela Bassett, and Robin Wright.

Damsel began streaming on Netflix to mixed reviews on March 8, 2024.

== Plot ==
The first king of Aurea leads a futile attack on a dragon residing in his realm. All the king's men are killed, leaving the king at the Dragon's mercy.

Centuries later, Elodie, the daughter of Lord Bayford, receives a proposal from Queen Isabelle of Aurea to marry her son, Prince Henry. On her father's urging, Elodie agrees to the marriage so her bride price can help their impoverished people. Upon arriving in Aurea, Elodie and Henry are initially uninterested in each other, but begin to bond as they share a desire to travel. Elodie's stepmother, Lady Bayford, becomes suspicious of the motives of Queen Isabelle, leading her to futilely implore Elodie to end the engagement.

After the wedding, Elodie and Henry take part in an ancient ritual in the mountains, supposedly to celebrate their union. Isabelle describes the pact between the first king and the Dragon, where he had to sacrifice his three daughters to ensure peace between his people and the dragon. Following a ceremony where their palms are cut and held together, Henry carries Elodie across the narrow path over the Dragon's lair, then at Isabelle's behest throws her down the chasm.

Recovering from the fall, Elodie realizes that she is an actual sacrifice. She escapes the Dragon after it burns her leg, and discovers an illuminated cave filled with glowing silk worms, which she collects as a light source. Elodie reaches a chamber with the note "Safe Here She Cannot Reach", the names of past victims, and a map carved into the wall. While Elodie sleeps, the worms heal the burn on her leg.

Elodie follows the map to a dead end at a high vertical drop on the mountainside. She discovers the remains of dead dragon hatchlings, explaining the reason for the royal sacrifices. A rescue party led by Lord Bayford arrives. The Dragon kills them, including Lord Bayford, but the distraction allows Elodie to escape the mountain. She takes one of the rescue party's horses and hides under a rock as the Dragon burns the surrounding area in an unsuccessful pursuit.

Alerted by the conflagration that Elodie's sacrifice has failed, Isabelle resorts to kidnapping Elodie's younger sister Floria as a replacement. After learning this from a desperate Lady Bayford, Elodie returns to the mountain to rescue Floria, whom the Dragon has left alive as bait.

Elodie creates a diversion to reach Floria. Telling her sister to hide, she confronts the Dragon and tries to convince her that they were deceived by the Aureans: by joining their cut hands at the wedding, the blood of the brides and the Aurean royals mingled, making the Dragon think that the princesses were of Aurean descent. Refusing to believe Elodie, the Dragon states that the first king's assault was unprovoked, and then attacks her. The two battle until Elodie tricks the Dragon into burning herself. With the Dragon at her mercy, she convinces the Dragon of the truth and heals both of them with the glowing worms.

Elodie then interrupts the wedding of another sacrifice at the palace, exposing the Aurean royal family's treachery. Elodie advises the new bride and her family to flee, and the Dragon burns the palace with all the Aurean royals and nobles inside. Henry, remorseful for his actions, is shown accepting his fate, while Isabelle screams in defeat. Days later, Elodie, Floria, and Lady Bayford sail home, loaded with supplies and accompanied by the Dragon.

== Cast ==
- Millie Bobby Brown as Elodie, a young woman from an unnamed northern land
- Ray Winstone as Lord Bayford of an unknown northern land and Elodie's father
- Angela Bassett as Lady Bayford, the wife of Lord Bayford and Elodie's stepmother
- Brooke Carter as Floria, Elodie's younger sister
- Nick Robinson as Prince Henry, the prince of Aurea
- Robin Wright as Queen Isabelle, the queen regnant of Aurea and Prince Henry's mother
- Milo Twomey as King Roderick, the king consort of Aurea and Prince Henry's father
- Nicole Joseph as Princess Victoria, one of the previous princesses sacrificed to the dragon
- Shohreh Aghdashloo as the voice of the Dragon, an unnamed dragon that demands sacrifices of Aurea's princesses (Note: The novelization of the film referred to the dragon as Khaevis.)

== Production ==
Damsel was directed by Juan Carlos Fresnadillo from a script by Dan Mazeau, and produced by Joe Roth and Jeff Kirschenbaum through their production company for Netflix. Emily Ballou and Mark Bomback were credited for "additional literary material" off-screen.

In November 2020, Millie Bobby Brown was cast as Princess Elodie; she was also named as the film's executive producer. In April 2022, it was reported that Angela Bassett, Nick Robinson, Robin Wright, Ray Winstone, Brooke Carter, and Shohreh Aghdashloo were part of the cast.

Principal photography took place in early 2022. Cave scenes were shot at Troubadour Meridian Water Studios in London. Filming also took place in Portugal at Tomar, Sortelha, Serra da Estrela, and at the Batalha Monastery. The dragon was designed by Patrick Tatopoulos. Netflix spent $145.1 million producing the film, which came down to a net cost of $109.2 million after UK tax incentives.

The film's score was composed by David Fleming and produced by Hans Zimmer. The soundtrack includes a cover of the Johnny Cash song "Ring of Fire", performed by Lykke Li. Netflix Music released the soundtrack album digitally on March 5, 2024.

== Release ==
Damsel was scheduled to stream on Netflix on October 13, 2023. However, due to the impact of the 2023 SAG-AFTRA strike on the film's promotion, the original release date was postponed and the film began streaming on March 8, 2024.

=== Novel ===
Author Evelyn Skye released a novelization of the film in advance. She stated: "The easiest way to think about it is this: Dan Mazeau wrote the original screenplay. I was able to read an early draft and was given free rein to write my own version of the story, which ultimately became the novel. Both the novel and the movie may stem from the same origin, but they are also each their own unique works of art".

The novel was published by Penguin Random House on April 18, 2023.

== Reception ==
=== Audience viewership ===
According to Netflix, the film amassed 35.3 million views (or 64.8 million hours) in its first three days, placing first in 79 countries. Between its debut and the end of June, total views rose to 143 million, making it the most-watched Netflix film for the first half of 2024.

=== Critical response ===
The film received mixed reviews. On the review aggregator website Rotten Tomatoes, 56% of 127 critics' reviews are positive, with an average rating of 5.5/10. The website's consensus reads: "Damsel has an appealing action hero in Millie Bobby Brown, whose gutsy performance is often enough to balance the scales against the film's underpowered story and occasionally unconvincing effects." Metacritic, which uses a weighted average, assigned the film a score of 46 out of 100, based on 28 critics, indicating "mixed or average" reviews.

Mick LaSalle of the San Francisco Chronicle criticized Brown's character, but praised her commitment to the role, writing "The movie could have used a little less of Brown cowering behind boulders as the flames get closer and a little more of her getting even with the people who put her in this predicament". Peter Debruge of Variety wrote, "Deliciously improper at times, Damsel adheres to codes that can feel a bit calculated, less organic than crafted in response to a newly progressive corporate agenda (the signs are there at all levels, from inclusive casting to occasionally self-righteous dialogue)". Kate Erbland of IndieWire gave it a grade of "C+". Tim Robey of The Telegraph awarded it one star out of five, writing "If a straight-to-landfill quality is synonymous with the worst of Netflix, Damsel sums this up by having the tackiness of a plastic wedding cake."
