= The Plot Against America (miniseries) =

American television miniseries

- Genre: Drama; Alternate history
- Created by: David Simon; Ed Burns
- Based on: The Plot Against America by Philip Roth
- Starring: Winona Ryder; Anthony Boyle; Zoe Kazan; Morgan Spector; Michael Kostroff; David Krumholtz; Azhy Robertson; Caleb Malis; Jacob Laval; John Turturro
- Country of origin: United States
- Original language: English
- No. of episodes: 6

Production
- Executive producers: Joe Roth; Jeff Kirschenbaum; Megan Ellison; Sue Naegle; Susan Goldberg; Ed Burns; Nina K. Noble; David Simon
- Producer: Claire M. Shanley
- Cinematography: Martin Ahlgren
- Running time: 60 minutes
- Production companies: RK Films; Annapurna Television; Blown Deadline Productions

Original release
- Network: HBO
- Release: March 16 – April 20, 2020

The Plot Against America is an American alternate history drama television miniseries created and written by David Simon and Ed Burns, based on the 2004 novel of the same name by Philip Roth, that aired on HBO from March 16, 2020, to April 20, 2020.

== Premise ==
The Plot Against America "imagines an alternate American history told through the eyes of a working-class Jewish family in Newark, New Jersey, as they watch the political rise of Charles Lindbergh, an aviator-hero and xenophobic populist, who becomes president and turns the nation toward fascism."

== Production ==
HBO announced on November 8, 2018, that it had ordered a six-episode miniseries based on Philip Roth's novel The Plot Against America to be written by David Simon and Ed Burns and executive produced by Simon, Burns, and Roth, alongside Joe Roth, Jeff Kirschenbaum, Nina Noble, Megan Ellison, Sue Naegle, Susan Goldberg, and Dennis Stratton. Production companies involved with the series include Annapurna Pictures and Blown Deadline Productions. In April 2019, Winona Ryder, Zoe Kazan, Morgan Spector, John Turturro, Anthony Boyle, Azhy Robertson, and Caleb Malis joined the cast of the series.

"The Road is Open Again", written in 1933 for Franklin D. Roosevelt's National Recovery Administration, was used for the opening theme song, performed by actor Michael Kostroff.

Simon had read the novel in 2004, but thought it politically irrelevant; though approached by Tom Rothman in 2013 to adapt it for television, he declined. He decided to take on the project in the aftermath of the 2016 US election, in which Donald Trump was elected US President, saying that Roth's novel had proven "perversely...allegorical," and approaching his longtime collaborator Ed Burns, with whom he had worked on The Wire and Generation Kill, to co-write. Events such as the Unite the Right rally in Charlottesville influenced the adaptation.

A point of concern was the show's ending, about which Simon approached Roth, and to which Roth provided no solution. Simon and Burns chose a more ambiguous conclusion than the novel's, though one more directly involving characters in ending the Lindbergh administration, and expanded the perspective beyond just the novel's narrator, Philip. Roth himself expressed potential concerns, suggesting that the family name be changed to Weiss (Simon chose Levin), that the family be assimilated Americans, and for the production team to not "confuse" Lindbergh for Trump.

=== Filming ===
Filming location in Greenville, Jersey City
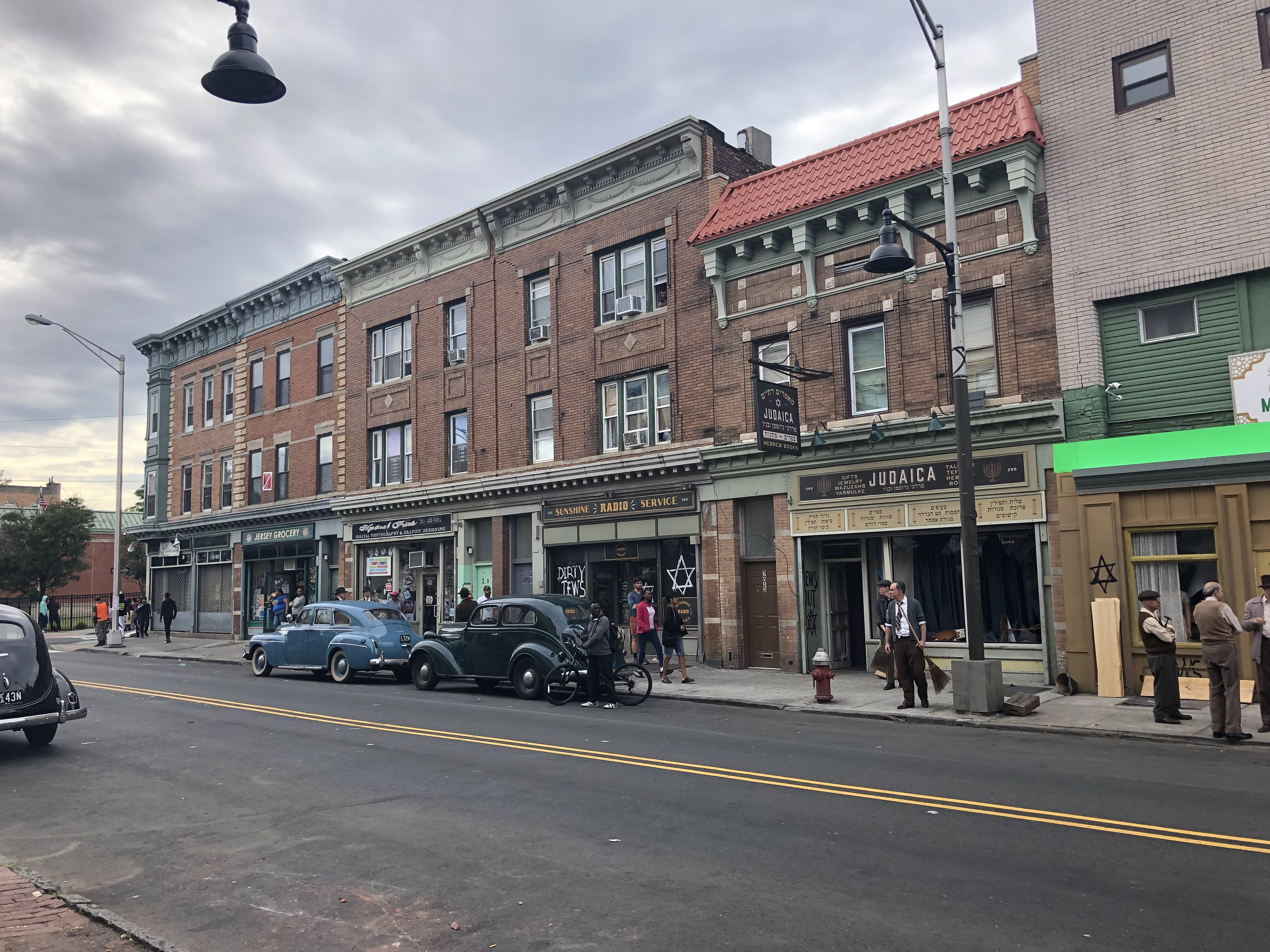
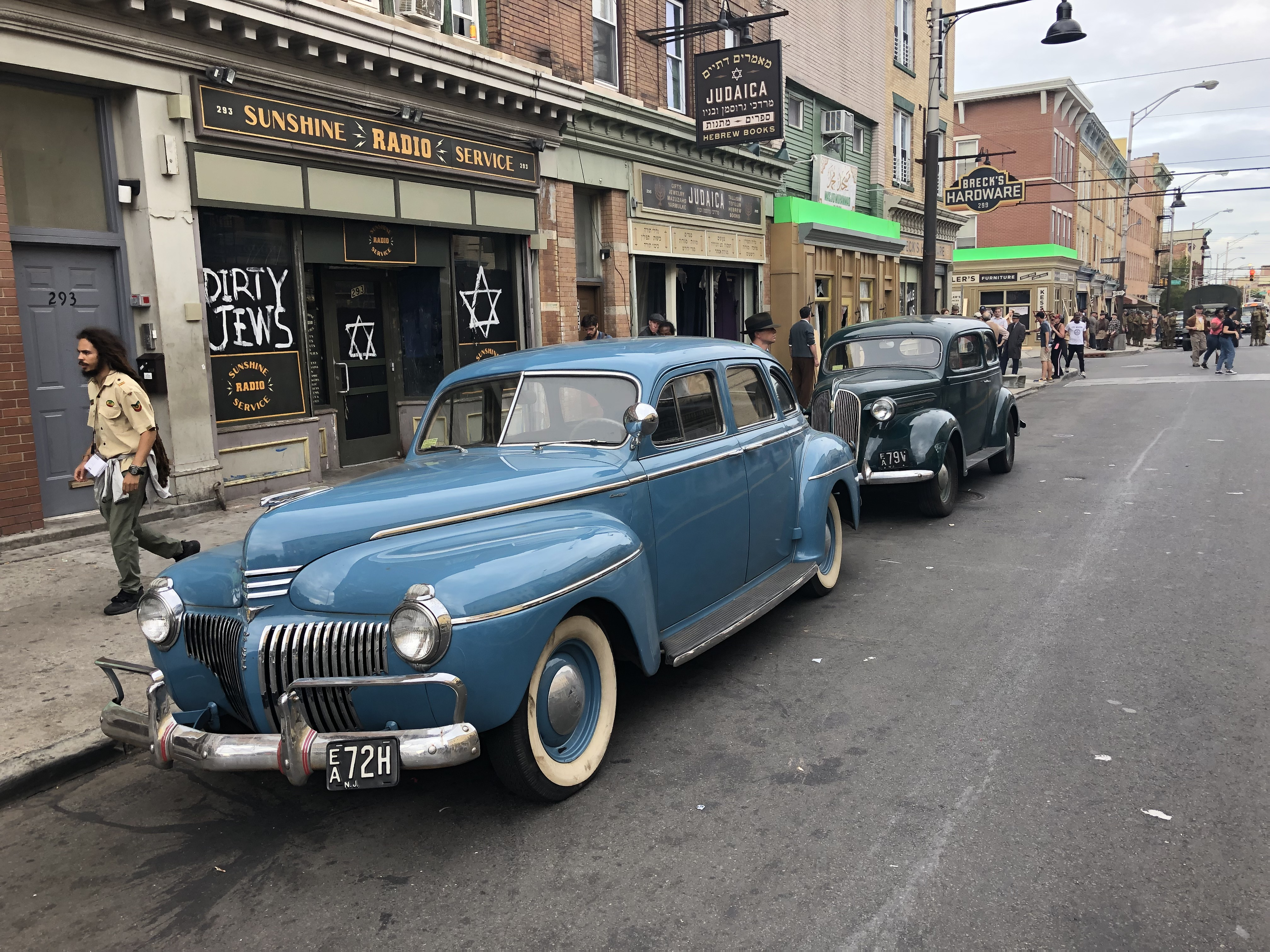
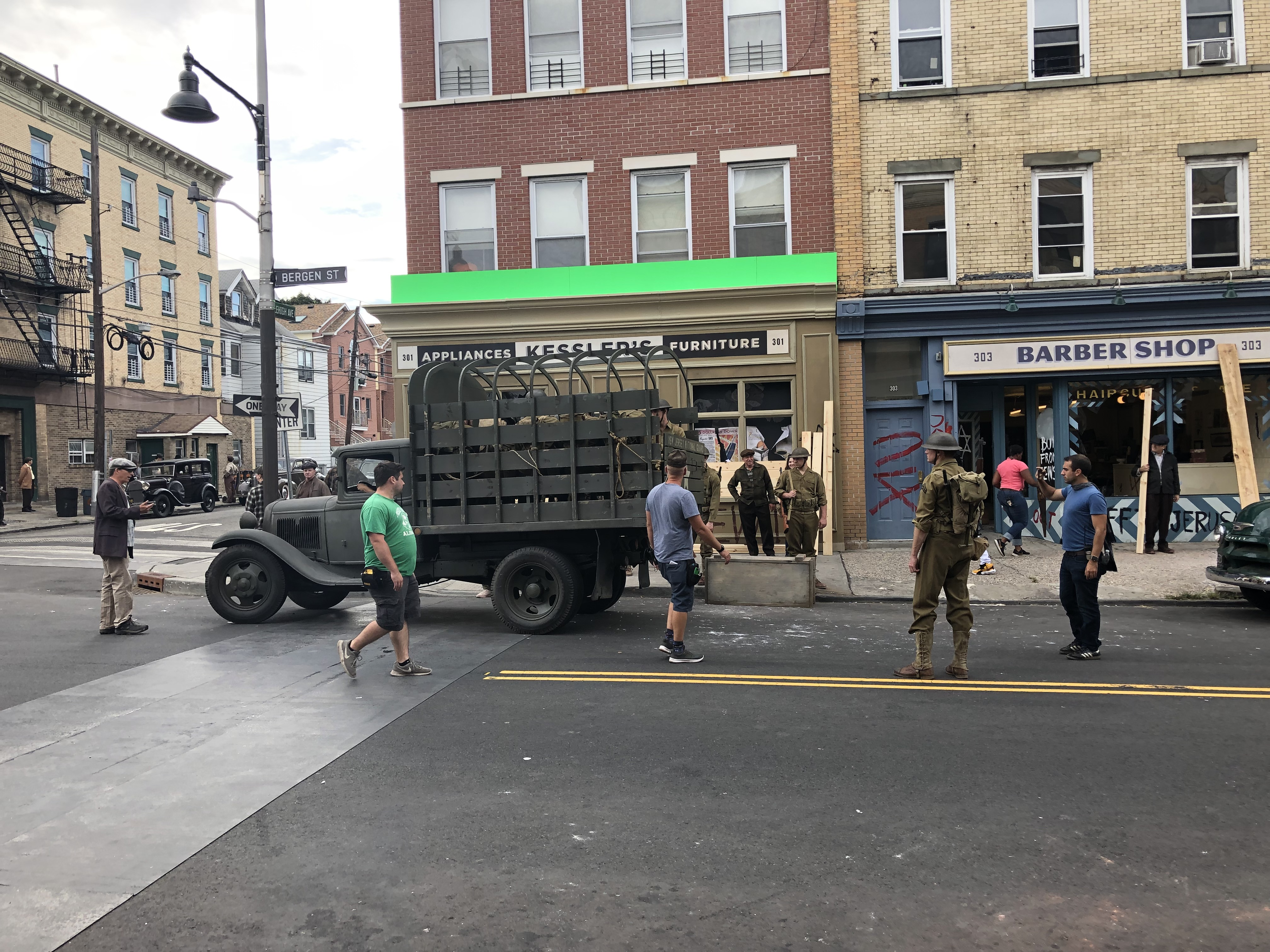

Filming took place in 2019 at a number of locations, including:

- Jersey City at Temple Beth-El and in the Greenville shopping district in May
- Downtown Paterson in May
- Newark in June
- Cranford, New Jersey, on August 29–30
- New York City in May and June
- Baltimore, on June 13–14, including on the deck of the SS John W. Brown, a WWII Liberty ship docked at the Canton Dock
- Washington, D.C., on June 14–16

== Cast and characters ==
=== Main ===
- Morgan Spector as Herman Levin, an insurance agent with a promising career, and an opinionated New Deal socialist
- Zoe Kazan as Elizabeth "Bess" Levin, Herman's wife and stay-at-home mother
- Winona Ryder as Evelyn Finkel, Bess's older, unmarried, independent-minded sister
- John Turturro as Rabbi Lionel Bengelsdorf, a charismatic leader and supporter of Charles Lindbergh, and Evelyn's lover
- Anthony Boyle as Alvin Levin, Herman's orphaned, young-adult nephew, who lives with him
- Michael Kostroff as Shepsie Tirchwell, Herman's friend, who manages a newsreel theater and discusses politics with Herman
- David Krumholtz as Monty Levin, Herman's older brother, a successful grocery supplier
- Azhy Robertson as Philip Levin, the Levins’ 10-year-old son
- Caleb Malis as Sanford "Sandy" Levin, their rebellious teenaged son, who is a talented artist
- Jacob Laval as Seldon Wishnow, a shy and awkward boy who lives in the downstairs section of the house, who is eventually fostered by the Levins

=== Recurring ===
- Ben Cole as Brigadier General Charles Lindbergh, a fictionalized portrayal of Lindbergh, as a xenophobic populist who runs for President on a ticket of opposition to U.S. involvement in the war
- Caroline Kaplan as Anne Morrow Lindbergh
- Billy Carter as Walter Winchell
- Ed Moran as Henry Ford
- Daniel O'Shea as Burton K. Wheeler
- Orest Ludwig as Joachim von Ribbentrop
- Kristen Sieh as Selma Wishnow
- Lee Tergesen as Agent Don McCorkle
- Graydon Yosowitz as Earl Axman, Philip's delinquent school friend
- Steven Maier as Shushy Margulis
- Zach McNally as Billy Murphy
- Michael Cerveris as Mr. Taylor

== Episodes ==
No.	Title	Directed by	Teleplay by	Original release date	U.S. viewers (millions)
1	"Part 1"	Minkie Spiro	Ed Burns & David Simon	March 16, 2020	0.407
June 1940. Herman is angred by the anti-war rhetoric of populist aviator hero Charles Lindbergh with its antisemitic overtones, but does not take seriously the possibility of his running for the Presidency. Herman is offered a promotion, but this would require the family to move to Union, where they would likely be the only Jewish family in the neighborhood. Disgusted by the patrons at a German-themed bar in Union, he decides to decline the offer. Alvin is fired from his job at a local Esso service station for stealing; he tells Sandy he took the blame for a friend. He moves out of the house after an argument with Herman. Bess's older sister Evelyn, who looks after their mother, is having an affair with a married man in New York; it soon becomes clear that he has no intention of divorcing his wife. Philip's friend Earl, whose mother has a scandalous reputation, is a corrupting influence on him. Evelyn and Bess meet Rabbi Bengelsdorf, who is sympathetic to Lindbergh's anti-war message; Evelyn is charmed. Alvin secretly stays with a friend whose father runs a candy store. At night, he and two friends wait outside the German bar in Union and beat up two drunk patrons on their way home, calling them fascists.
2	"Part 2"	Minkie Spiro	David Simon & Ed Burns	March 23, 2020	0.395
October 1940. Sandy eagerly attends a speech by Lindbergh, with Evelyn and Bengelsdorf present. Evelyn and Bengelsdorf later enter into a relationship, and Evelyn introduces him to her mother. Bengelsdorf assures Evelyn he will attempt to sway her family to his side politically. With Herman's assistance, Alvin takes a job as a driver for a wealthy man named Abe Steinheim, but quickly grows to find him crass and corrupt. To aid her family financially, Bess takes a retail job at an expensive department store, but soon becomes unnerved by the Lindbergh-supporting customers. Philip continues to learn delinquent behavior from Earl, including thieving and following strangers around the city. Speaking at a Lindbergh rally, Bengelsdorf lavishly endorses the candidate, with Evelyn by his side. Disgusted by Bengelsdorf and the direction of the country, Alvin quits his job and enlists in the Canadian Army. Lindbergh later wins the election and becomes President.
3	"Part 3"	Minkie Spiro	Ed Burns	March 30, 2020	0.357
May 1941. A few months after Lindbergh's inauguration, antisemitic incidents are on the rise in the United States. Lindbergh signs a neutrality agreement with Adolf Hitler. He also places Bengelsdorf in charge of a program called "Just Folks", as part of the Office of American Absorption, which temporarily places Jewish boys into rural families to make them "more American"; Evelyn signs up Sandy to participate. Philip begins to have nightmares about Nazis. Evelyn and Bess's mother's dementia is worsening. As Bess's concern for her family's safety grows, she places them on a waiting list to emigrate to Canada. The Levins take a trip to Washington, D.C., where they experience antisemitism among both citizens and the police. Herman ultimately gives his permission for Sandy to travel to Kentucky as part of Just Folks. Alvin flourishes in Canada's military program, and is recruited by British intelligence to help steal a German radar device and loses his leg in combat.
4	"Part 4"	Thomas Schlamme	David Simon & Reena Rexrode	April 6, 2020	0.420
September 1941. Bess and Evelyn's mother dies. Herman visits Alvin in the hospital and offers his support, but Alvin has grown aloof and disillusioned. Alvin is questioned by the Federal Bureau of Investigation (FBI) after which he is discharged and returns to New Jersey. In a synagogue, Sandy gives a presentation espousing Just Folks, after being designated a 'Recruitment Officer' by Evelyn. When Evelyn and Bengelsdorf join the Levins for Shabbat, Herman clashes with Bengelsdorf's views and upbringing, including his father fighting for the Confederacy. After Bengelsdorf proposes an expansion of Just Folks, Anne Morrow Lindbergh invites him and Evelyn to a state dinner with the German Foreign Minister Joachim von Ribbentrop (as all other Jewish representatives refused). Evelyn also secures an invitation for Sandy, which enrages Herman and Bess, who refuse to let Sandy attend. He responds by calling his parents "ghetto Jews" and "worse than Hitler". Evelyn dances with the German official at the dinner, which appears later on the newsreels. The FBI has been tracking Alvin after marking him a potential Communist. Earl leaves town to live with his grandmother after his mother is committed to a psychiatric hospital. Seldon's father dies. Philip, overwhelmed by everything happening around him, happily watches a Lindbergh newsreel, much to Herman's exasperation.
5	"Part 5"	Thomas Schlamme	Ed Burns	April 13, 2020	0.433
April 1942. The Levins are forcibly signed up by Evelyn to participate in Homestead 42, Bengelsdorf's Just Folks expansion that relocates entire Jewish families. Bengelsdorf informs Bess that their participation will convince the FBI to take some heat off of Alvin. Philip expresses curiosity and concern about a Ku Klux Klan presence in Kentucky, and angrily asks Evelyn why his neighbor Seldon Wishnow, and Seldon's widowed mother Selma, weren't relocated instead. Misinterpreting this as a desire to be with his friend, Evelyn signs them up as well. Despite FBI threats, Herman intends to sue the OAA, but learns the legal process will take at least a year; instead, he quits his job to avoid the Homestead 42 obligation. Philip is overwhelmed with guilt when he realizes that he was the cause of Seldon's relocation to Kentucky, where he will almost certainly be unhappy. The FBI resumes tailing Alvin. Evelyn and Bengelsdorf marry in an extravagant ceremony unattended by the Levins. Outspoken radio host Walter Winchell escalates his anti-Lindbergh rhetoric; Bengelsdorf quickly gets him fired. Winchell announces a presidential run, and Herman attends his rally, but violent Lindbergh supporters attack the attendees as the police stand aside. When Herman returns home bloodied, Bess threatens to leave him and take the children to Canada if he continues his resistance.
6	"Part 6"	Thomas Schlamme	David Simon	April 20, 2020	0.392
September 1942. Antisemitic violence escalates and spreads throughout the country. Winchell is assassinated in Louisville. At his funeral, New York Mayor Fiorello la Guardia eulogizes him and denounces Lindbergh. In response, Bengelsdorf urges the First Lady to convince Lindbergh to issue a statement, but Lindbergh's speech is short and lacking in substance. Billy Murphy, a fellow veteran from the Canadian Army, visits Alvin and introduces him to a British agent who persuades Alvin to join a secretive anti-fascist group that wants to assassinate Lindbergh; Alvin's radar expertise is needed to track Lindbergh's Spirit of St. Louis (aircraft) that vanishes soon after. German radio spreads propaganda of a Jewish conspiracy, claims that are taken up by Acting President Wheeler who declares martial law and orders the arrests of prominent Jews including Bengelsdorf. Concerned by reports from Kentucky, Bess attempts to contact Selma, but is able to reach only a distraught Seldon, whose mother hasn't returned home. Herman and Sandy drive to Kentucky to pick up Seldon, where they learn Selma has been murdered by the Ku Klux Klan. They encounter more Klan members on the way back to New Jersey. A terrified Evelyn asks Bess for sanctuary, but Bess tells her to leave and never return. The First Lady issues a statement calling for civic peace, the release of the Jewish detainees, and urges Congress to replace Wheeler and call an emergency Presidential election. Bengelsdorf returns to his synagogue, finding his congregation all but gone. His claims that Lindbergh's presidency and subsequent disappearance were the result of a German blackmail operation are met with skepticism from his colleagues. Alvin visits the Levins with his fiancée, but has a fight with Herman over Alvin's apparent indifference to national events. In November, the emergency election is marred by government disenfranchisement of Roosevelt voters, and the series ends without the results being revealed.

== Broadcasting and streaming ==
In New Zealand, the series is distributed by Neon streaming service and SkyGo, which are owned by satellite television company Sky Network.

== Reception ==
=== Critical response ===
The miniseries received critical acclaim. On Rotten Tomatoes, it has an approval rating of 87% with an average rating of 8.2/10, based on 76 reviews. The website's critical consensus reads, "A cautionary tale that hits close to home, The Plot Against America's handsomely realized revisionist history is disturbingly relevant, making it difficult, but essential viewing." On Metacritic, it has a weighted average score of 82 out of 100, based on 37 critics, indicating "universal acclaim".

Meghan O'Keefe of Decider wrote that it "is a bleak watch, but full of spectacular performances and masterful craftsmanship." Darren Franich of Entertainment Weekly stated that "Simon and Burns craft their story with remarkable texture" and that "the final hour is one of the most breathtakingly tense episodes of television I've ever seen, carrying you on a dark journey through a country on fire."

James Poniewozik wrote in The New York Times that the show was "more than a thought exercise in 'Here’s what might have happened then, and thank God it didn’t.' Instead, it’s: 'Here’s what could happen at any time. Here’s what does happen, all the time. Why should we think we’re so special?'," adding that the novel was "too feel-good" in comparison.

=== Accolades ===
Year	Award	Category	Nominee(s)	Result	Ref.
2020	Primetime Emmy Awards	Outstanding Cinematography for a Limited Series or Movie	Martin Ahlgren (for "Part 1")	Nominated	
2020	TCA Awards	Outstanding Achievement in Movies, Miniseries and Specials	The Plot Against America	Nominated	
2021	American Society of Cinematographers Awards	Outstanding Achievement in Cinematography in Motion Picture, Miniseries or Pilot Made for Television	Martin Ahlgren (for "Part 6")	Nominated	
2021	Critics' Choice Television Awards	Best Limited Series	The Plot Against America	Nominated	
2021	Critics' Choice Television Awards	Best Actor in a Limited Series or TV Movie	Morgan Spector	Nominated	
2021	Critics' Choice Television Awards	Best Supporting Actor in a Limited Series or TV Movie	John Turturro	Nominated	
2021	Critics' Choice Television Awards	Best Supporting Actress in a Limited Series or TV Movie	Winona Ryder	Nominated	
