= A Family Affair (2024 film) =

2024 film by Richard LaGravenese

- Release poster
- Directed by: Richard LaGravenese
- Written by: Carrie Solomon
- Produced by: Joe Roth; Jeff Kirschenbaum
- Starring: Nicole Kidman; Zac Efron; Joey King; Kathy Bates
- Cinematography: Don Burgess
- Edited by: Melissa Bretherton
- Music by: Siddhartha Khosla
- Production company: Roth/Kirschenbaum Films
- Distributed by: Netflix
- Release date: June 28, 2024
- Running time: 114 minutes
- Country: United States
- Language: English

A Family Affair is a 2024 American romantic comedy film directed by Richard LaGravenese and written by Carrie Solomon. The film stars Nicole Kidman, Zac Efron, Joey King, and Kathy Bates.

The film revolves around Zara, a 20-something personal assistant to self-absorbed popular actor Chris Cole, whose widowed best-selling author mother Brooke inadvertently meets then begins a relationship with her boss.

It was released by Netflix on June 28, 2024, and received mixed reviews from critics.

== Plot ==
24-year-old Zara, the personal assistant to self-absorbed Hollywood actor Chris Cole, is tired of being under-appreciated. She is expected to help him when he breaks up with women, and he ignores her advice to get a different writer to rewrite a bad script. When Chris changes the gate code on her while she is talking to a writer, Zara quits.

A short time later, Chris goes to Zara's house to offer her an assistant producer position as he misses her. Instead, he finds her widowed author mother Brooke, as Zara is running errands. Deciding to wait for her, Chris explains that his script is bad, and they soon hit it off.

By the time Zara returns, she unwittingly walks in on her mother and Chris having sex. He promises Zara it will not happen again, so she returns to work for him as associate producer. Chris invites Brooke to dinner, and they again connect intimately.

Zara discovers that Chris hired Brooke as his new writer, so confronts them at a gala. Brooke says she is happy with Chris and has not felt this happy since she was with her husband, disregarding her daughter's pain and her concern he will hurt Brooke as he often does with women he dates. The family and Chris visit Brooke's mother-in-law Leila's house for Christmas.

Leila convinces Zara to let her mom have fun. In confidence, Brooke tells Leila that she was having relationship problems with Zara's dad even before he died, and Zara overhears this. Later, while putting bags in the car, Zara notices diamond earrings in Chris's bag.

At home, Zara tells Brooke and Chris how bad he is, explaining that he buys the same earrings for everyone he breaks up with and already has a pair ready. This revelation prompts Brooke to ask Chris to leave. Later at the studio, Zara is asked to find Chris, who is upset and alone.

Chris confides in Zara, expressing doubt about playing the good guy. He clarifies that he was not planning to break up with Brooke; he just forgot the earrings were in his bag because he often ends relationships impulsively. Zara then goes to her mom, insisting she was wrong about Chris, but Brooke refuses to listen.

Zara orchestrates an encounter between her, Chris, and Brooke at the supermarket, explains her mistake, and apologizes to them both. Following this reconciliation, Chris and Brooke get back together. A year later, their relationship is still going strong. Zara has been further promoted as a producer working with Chris, and their relationship is also strong.

== Cast ==
- Nicole Kidman as Brooke Harwood, a writer
- Zac Efron as Chris Cole
- Joey King as Zara Ford, Brooke's daughter
- Liza Koshy as Eugenie
- Kathy Bates as Leila Ford, Brooke's mother-in-law and Zara's grandmother
- Sherry Cola as Stella

== Production ==
=== Development ===
On June 14, 2022, Nicole Kidman, Zac Efron, and Joey King were revealed to be cast as the three leads. On August 2, 2022, Kathy Bates and Liza Koshy were reported to join the cast. In a promotional interview, Efron stated that the film's working script title was Motherfucker, which Kidman clarified was "beeped out", with both laughing about the title keeping the script "at the top of the pile". The wording was cleaned up and included in a byline on the film poster, as "A Motherf*&#er of a Love Story." Joey King's character was inspired by Pamela Abdy, a friend of Richard LaGravenese who is currently co-chair and co-CEO of Warner Bros. Motion Picture Group.

=== Filming ===
Filming took place in Atlanta from August to October 2022. During the post-production phase, a reshoot was conducted two weekends in Trancas Country Market in Malibu, California, after 2023 WGA strike and 2023 SAG-AFTRA strike to capture the new ending.

== Release ==
A Family Affair was originally scheduled to be released by Netflix on November 17, 2023. However, the release of the film was postponed due to the impact of the 2023 SAG-AFTRA strike on the film's promotion. In April 2024, the finalized release date of June 28, 2024 was announced.

== Reception ==
=== Critical response ===
On the review aggregator website Rotten Tomatoes, 35% of 102 critics' reviews are positive, with an average rating of 4.8/10. The website's consensus reads: "Despite Zac Efron and Nicole Kidman's welcome return to rom-com territory, A Family Affair squabbles with its own tonality too much to elevate its litany of clichés." Metacritic, which uses a weighted average, assigned the film a score of 43 out of 100, based on 23 critics, indicating "mixed or average" reviews.

Tomris Laffly of Variety criticized the film in various aspects, from the acting as having "little chemistry", to the directing as "oddly rigid and dull", to the production design as inauthentic. William Bibbiani of TheWrap mentioned that "It’s almost worth watching for Zac Efron and Nicole Kidman’s magnetism alone. If by 'almost' you mean 'not really.'" Tania Hussain of Collider noted that the film "struggles to find its footing and unique style without ever standing out like the streamer’s previous originals", it "never finds its authenticity" and it "just never feels natural."

Angie Han of The Hollywood Reporter praised the performance of Kidman and Efron as having "a decently sweet chemistry that’s nothing like the tawdry dynamic they flaunted in The Paperboy". Pete Hammond of Deadline also noted that the highlight of the film was the chemistry between Kidman and Efron and that audiences "instantly believe the chemistry despite the 21-year age difference between the two stars."

Despite noting that the film "is not as fun as the premise initially promises, and no amount of star power can fix that", Mireia Mullor of Digital Spy pointed out that "the scene-stealer of the film, though, is Kathy Bates' Leila, Brooke's mother-in-law, and Zara's grandmother" due to her warm performance. Coleman Spilde of The Daily Beast, on the one hand, criticized the script as one of the weakest points of the film since "the balance between comedy and drama is not Solomon’s strong suit, and her script bounces between the two with frustrating incompetence." On the other hand, he praised the chemistry between Kidman and Efron.

Karl Quinn of The Sydney Morning Herald rated the film 2½ stars and noted that "In the end, [the film] plays like nothing so much as a better-produced and (mostly) better-acted version of the sort of rom-com the streaming production line has been pumping out in recent years. Cue the sunsets, beaches, candle-lit dinners, and endless costume changes. It’s generic, predictable, mildly enjoyable, and instantly forgettable." Critic Jamie Tram of ABC News said that the film "inexplicably makes the prospect of dating a famous actor seem hideously dull. The strategy behind these films seems less concerned with showcasing its acting talent, and more focused on assembling a cast that can look enticing on a thumbnail. Kidman and Efron merely exist to sell the illusion of prestige."

=== Audience viewership ===
Despite mixed reviews, the film debuted as the #1 Netflix original on the weekend of its release, according to the rankings from Netflix's domestic daily chart published on July 1, 2024. The film garnered 26.8 million views since its launch on June 28, 2024. According to Netflix's domestic daily chart released on July 8, 2024, the film held steady at No. 2 among Netflix originals during its second weekend of release. It accumulated 31.9 million views in its first full week of availability, an increase from 26.8 million views the previous week. The film held the No. 5 position in its third and fourth weeks, generating an additional 11.6 million and 5.5 million views, respectively. In its fifth week, the film secured the No. 7 spot, garnering an additional 3.3 million views. The film placed No. 7 in the top 10 movies on Netflix for the second half of 2024.
