= Jackpot! (film) =

2024 film by Paul Feig

- Release poster
- Directed by: Paul Feig
- Written by: Rob Yescombe
- Produced by: Joe Roth; Jeff Kirschenbaum; Paul Feig; Laura Fischer
- Starring: Awkwafina; John Cena; Ayden Mayeri; Donald Elise Watkins; Sam Asghari; Simu Liu
- Cinematography: John Schwartzman
- Edited by: Brent White
- Music by: Theodore Shapiro
- Production companies: Roth/Kirschenbaum Films; Feigco Entertainment
- Distributed by: Amazon MGM Studios
- Release date: August 15, 2024
- Running time: 106 minutes
- Country: United States
- Language: English

Jackpot! is a 2024 American dystopian action comedy film directed by Paul Feig and written by Rob Yescombe. It stars Awkwafina as Katie, a former child actor who wins a $3.6 billion lottery and must fend off people trying to kill her in a near-future California. The film also stars John Cena, Ayden Mayeri, Donald Elise Watkins, Sam Asghari, and Simu Liu.

Amazon Studios began developing the film under the title Grand Death Lotto in March 2023. Awkwafina, Cena, and the rest of the cast was announced, and filming began the same month. Jackpot! was released through Prime Video on August 15, 2024, and received mixed reviews.

== Plot ==
By 2030, the financially desperate government of California creates the deadly Grand Lottery: each Lottery Day, the randomly selected winner must survive until sundown; anyone with a losing ticket can kill the winner to claim the multi-million dollar prize instead, but no one may use guns.

Former child actor Katie Kim arrives in Los Angeles with hopes of reentering show business, unaware of the Lottery and its record $3.6 billion jackpot. Renting an Airbnb room from money-hungry Shadi and her boyfriend DJ, Katie attends a disappointing audition, and inadvertently enters and wins the Lottery.

Attacked on sight by everyone around her, Katie is soon found by Noel Cassidy, a freelance Lottery protection agent who offers his services in exchange for ten percent of her winnings. Fighting off dozens of Katie's murderous "fans" using non-lethal means, Noel and Katie escape in his car, and he explains that a drone tracking Katie will post her location every 14 minutes, but she can officially quit the Lottery by reaching the Grapevine on the outskirts of the city.

Unwilling to trust Noel, Katie realizes that even the police want to kill her and flees on foot. A sympathetic security guard lets her hide inside a wax museum, but a phone call from Shadi leads her and DJ to Katie’s location. She escapes and is rescued by Noel, pursued by Shadi, DJ, and a sightseeing bus full of tourists.

Driving to MGK’s mansion, they commandeer his panic room, shooting him with tranquilizer darts, and Noel assures Katie of his commitment to helping her. Shadi coerces MGK to give up the panic room’s passcode, forcing Noel to call in a favor with the Lewis Protection Agency. Before the mob can break in, the LPA short-circuits their phones and drives Katie and Noel to safety.

At LPA’s high-tech facility, Katie meets Louis Lewis, the head of the agency, who agrees to protect her in exchange for the LPA and Noel each receiving thirty percent of the prize money. Noel reveals that he and Louis are the sole survivors of a team of mercenaries, and Noel uses his protection earnings to support the families of their fallen comrades.

Katie is given an elaborate prosthetic disguise and prepares to be driven to safety, but Noel suspects that the LPA has been murdering their clients, keeping the winners anonymous and claiming their winnings. He allows the crowd of “fans” into the facility, allowing Katie to drive away alone, and is captured by Louis.

Before Katie can reach the Grapevine, Louis calls, threatening to kill Noel unless she surrenders. Louis brings Noel to an abandoned theater, admitting that he killed their fellow mercenaries to keep a stash of gold for himself. Katie arrives and forces Louis to spare Noel by threatening to kill herself and forfeit the jackpot, livestreaming on her phone as proof.

The livestream summons Katie’s “fans”, and she and Noel fight off the mob and the LPA. Cornered by Louis high above the stage, Katie manages to kill him with his own grenades, but falls from the scaffolding. However, she is caught by a crowd of genuine fans who have arrived to help, just as the Lottery deadline runs out. She and Noel celebrate her victory.

Six months later, Katie and Noel have used her prize money to open a variety of businesses and non-profits, including their own protection agency that guards Lottery winners for free. Mid-credits scenes reveal that they have bought a superyacht, acknowledging that money has changed them, while MGK orders an improved panic room and more darts, and the Grand Lottery prepares to expand across the country.

== Cast ==
- Awkwafina as Katie
- John Cena as Noel
- Ayden Mayeri as Shadi
- Donald Elise Watkins as DJ Donald
- Sam Asghari as Senior Agent Ash
- MGK as himself
- Simu Liu as Louis Lewis
- Seann William Scott as Rugged Man
- Marian Green as Lunch Lady
- Rosanna Scotto as News anchor
- Dolly de Leon as Grandma Tala
- Murray Hill as Johnny Grand
- Becky Ann Baker as Sweet Irene
- Adam Ray as Asshole Dad
- Monique Ganderton as Agent Hoyt
- Bobby Lee as himself
- Leslie David Baker as Earl the Fameland Guard
- Michael Hitchcock as Sleazy Ron Wexler

== Production ==
In March 2023, it was announced that an action comedy film titled Grand Death Lotto was in development at Amazon Studios. Paul Feig had been hired to direct, written by Rob Yescombe, and produced by Joe Roth, Jeff Kirschenbaum, Feig, and Laura Fischer. John Cena, Zack Roth and Yescombe served as executive producers. Cena, Awkwafina, and Simu Liu were cast in the main roles. Ayden Mayeri, Seann William Scott, Dolly de Leon and Donald Elise Watkins joined the cast later in the month. Principal photography began in March 2023 at Shadowbox Studios in Atlanta, Georgia. Jackpot! was released through Prime Video on August 15, 2024.

== Reception ==
On the review aggregator website Rotten Tomatoes, 32% of 79 critics' reviews are positive, with an average rating of 4.7/10. The website's consensus reads: "Despite having a cast and crew of comedy all-stars on hand, Jackpot! provides little payout thanks to a puerile script and erratic pacing." Metacritic, which uses a weighted average, assigned the film a score of 41 out of 100, based on 21 critics, indicating "mixed or average" reviews.
