= Ballistic (Greaney novel) =

2011 thriller novel by Mark Greaney

- First edition cover
- Author: Mark Greaney
- Audio read by: Jay Snyder
- Language: English
- Series: The Gray Man
- Release number: 3
- Genre: Thriller
- Publisher: Berkley Publishing Group
- Publication date: October 4, 2011
- Publication place: United States
- Media type: Print (paperback)
- Pages: 496
- ISBN: 978-0-425-24408-1
- Preceded by: On Target
- Followed by: Dead Eye

Ballistic is an action thriller novel by Mark Greaney, published on October 4, 2011, by Berkley Books. It is the third book in the Gray Man series, featuring assassin and former CIA operative Court Gentry. It was preceded by On Target and followed by Dead Eye. The novel follows Gentry as he takes on a Mexican drug cartel after the murder of an old friend.

== Plot ==
In Fonte Boa, Brazil, Court Gentry evades a Colombian paramilitary group ordered by a Dane manhunter. He tracks down the manhunter, who tells him he was sent by Russian mob boss Gregor Sidorenko to hunt him down after double crossing him on an operation in Sudan, and kills him.

In Puerto Vallarta, Mexico, police major Eddie Gamboa raids the yacht of Daniel de la Rocha, leader of the Los Trajes Negros (Black Suits) drug cartel, alongside a special assault task force. However, de la Rocha rigs the yacht to explode, killing Gamboa and all but two of his men.

Court finds out about Eddie's death and remembers him as Eddie Gamble, a DEA agent he had rescued from a prison in Laos in 2000 as a CIA operative. He visits his grave in his hometown of San Blas, where he meets his family members, including his pregnant wife Elena and his younger sister Laura, as well as his friend Chuck Cullen, a retired U.S. Navy officer. Court tries to leave town the next day, but Chuck convinces him to stay and watch the Gamboa family as they make an appearance at a protest rally for Eddie and his men in Puerto Vallarta.

De la Rocha arrives at the rally and interrupts Elena's speech before he is shot, causing a riot as Federal Police officers working for de la Rocha and his sicarios gun down most of the attendees. Chuck is killed while trying to protect Elena, while Court moves the surviving Gamboa family out of Puerto Vallarta. De la Rocha is revealed to have survived the shooting due to his Kevlar clothing, and subsequently puts a hit out on Elena and her unborn son.

After briefly leaving the Gamboa family, Gentry offers to escort them to a hacienda in the Sierra Madre mountains owned by the parents of Laura's deceased husband. Local police and the Mexican army prevent them from leaving San Blas, until a pair of Federal Police officers arrive and wave them off. They introduce themselves as Sergeant Martin Fernandez and Sergeant Ramses Cortillo, the surviving members of Eddie's task force. They accompany Gentry and the Gamboa family to the hacienda.

De la Rocha's intelligence chief Nestor Calvo pinpoints the Gamboa family's location through Martin and Ramses, who had killed Federal Police officers on their way to capture the Gamboa family in San Blas. The head of the Black Suits's assassination wing, Javier "Spider" Duarte, sends waves of killers to the hacienda, killing Laura's in-laws and brother Ignacio as Court, Martin and Ramses fight them off. The following morning, a group of Federal Police officers sent by Spider surround the hacienda, tossing a skinned face of Martin's brother stitched into a soccer ball to the property. Court convinces Martin and Ramses to leave to protect their families. Martin sacrifices himself by creating a diversion so that Ramses can escape.

Later that night, Gentry steals a medium command vehicle and drives it to the hacienda, picking up the Gamboa family and escaping from the Federal Police. They part ways near Guadalajara, as Court and Laura drive to Mexico City to meet with a U.S. Embassy employee and secure visas for the family to go to the U.S. However, the employee informs de la Rocha and also tells him that the CIA have a shoot-on-sight directive on Gentry. They agree to trade him for information on de la Rocha's rival, Los Vaqueros (Cowboys) cartel leader Constantino Madrigal.

Court and Laura make love that night. The next day, they are captured by Federal Police officers ordered by de la Rocha. Court is tortured as the CIA sends his former Special Activities Division (SAD) boss Matthew Hanley to identify him. Hanley kills his torturers and rescues him. After parting ways with Hanley, Gentry forces the embassy employee to ensure the Gamboa family’s safe passage to the U.S. through the border crossing at Tijuana.

Gentry sets up a meeting with Madrigal, who agrees to his one-man war against the Black Suits by disrupting their drug operations unless de la Rocha calls off the hunt for Elena and gives up Laura. De la Rocha declares war on the Cowboys, forcing Calvo to secretly make a deal with Madrigal and have Gentry killed to end the war. However, Gentry offers to kidnap Calvo, who then tells him about de la Rocha's mansion in Puerto Vallarta. After hiding Calvo, Gentry infiltrates the mansion and finds de la Rocha and Spider, who takes Laura hostage. Gentry kills Spider and saves Laura as the Cowboys storm the mansion. They catch up to de la Rocha as he escapes in a helicopter, where Laura shoots him dead.

Gentry frees Calvo, who replaces de la Rocha as the leader of the Black Suits. Laura decides to become a nun. Madrigal vows to hunt down Gentry for not giving him Calvo.

== Development ==
Greaney traveled to Mexico for research before writing Ballistic. In an interview with the Memphis Flyer, he talked about the Court Gentry character: "He wonders if he's gone too far. He wonders if he's turned into something that he can't turn away from. But I had lunch with my editor recently and he said, 'I never want to see this guy too nice.'"

Ballistic was nominated for Best Thriller at the 2012 Barry Awards, but lost to Thirteen Hours by Deon Meyer.

== Critical reception ==
Publishers Weekly reviewed the book: "Greaney once again pumps new life into familiar thriller conventions."
