= Ron's Gone Wrong (soundtrack) =

Ron's Gone Wrong (Original Motion Picture Soundtrack)

Soundtrack album by Henry Jackman
- Released: October 15, 2021
- Recorded: 2021
- Venue: London, England
- Studios: Abbey Road Studios; Air Studios
- Genre: Film soundtrack
- Length: 68:46
- Label: Hollywood
- Producer: Henry Jackman

Henry Jackman chronology
Cherry (2021)	Ron's Gone Wrong (2021)	The Gray Man (2022)

Singles from Ron's Gone Wrong (Original Motion Picture Soundtrack)
- 1. "Sunshine" Released: September 24, 2021

Ron's Gone Wrong (Original Motion Picture Soundtrack) is the soundtrack album to the 2021 animated film Ron's Gone Wrong. It was released digitally on October 15, 2021 by Hollywood Records, followed by a physical edition being published on October 22, the same day as the film's theatrical release. The soundtrack album features music composed by Henry Jackman, along with an original song titled "Sunshine" sung by Liam Payne, which was released as a part of the soundtrack on September 24.

== Development ==
Henry Jackman composed the film score. Speaking about the score, Jackman said that "it has its own identity, similar to Wreck-It Ralph or Big Hero 6" having the "same musical landscape and color in this film", and also had enjoyed working in the film, calling the scoring sessions as "enormous fun". Jean-Philippe Vine and Sarah Smith, the directors of the film, expressed gratitude to Jackman on how his score, elevated the film. In an interview to The Illuminerdi, he stated about how the music become important, especially for an animation film as they need to "give a sensational moment for audience to experience it in theatres". Smith had said that "working with Henry was the biggest blast ever. He's absolutely nuts and completely brilliant. And, I think we pushed him and pushed him, constantly kind of raising the bar for what we wanted with thematics and emotion and so on. And it's like he gives your movie back to you. And I know he's really proud of the score, and I'm really proud that he's really proud because I think he did some of his best work." Smith wanted the score to have a "contemporary John Hughes feel to it" while also asking him for "a classic 'high school movie' vibe and the orchestral scale and emotion of E.T. on top".

The score was recorded at Abbey Road Studios and Air Studios in London, England. Jackman composed most of the tracks, with two songs in collaboration with Dave Bayley of the indie-pop band Glass Animals. Liam Payne was reported to be composing and performing an original song in June 2021, On August 27, 2021, he released a music video for the film's soundtrack titled "Sunshine". Payne said that he wrote the song to impress his son Bear Payne, and he really "enjoyed working on the track".

== Track listing ==
No.	Title	Length
1.	"The Future of Friendship / New Friends" (with Dave Bayley)	3:59
2.	"Mark's Dream"	1:19
3.	"Happy Late Birthday"	1:18
4.	"Middle School Ain't So Bad"	1:28
5.	"Renegade Robot"	3:02
6.	"Welcome to the Bubble Store"	3:09
7.	"Night Light"	2:37
8.	"How to Be My Friend"	1:57
9.	"The Co-Founder"	1:22
10.	"Bonding"	1:17
11.	"Misguided Mission"	0:54
12.	"Unlocked and Out of Control"	1:47
13.	"Two-Way Street"	1:14
14.	"Unhinged"	1:26
15.	"Schoolyard Rave"	1:29
16.	"Best Friend Out of the Box"	1:29
17.	"Bot Pursuit"	0:56
18.	"Freedom in the Forest"	2:26
19.	"Missing"	1:24
20.	"Lost in the Woods"	2:41
21.	"My Life for Yours"	2:22
22.	"Rallying Cry"	3:06
23.	"Headquarters Heist"	3:45
24.	"Behold the Cloud"	1:42
25.	"We'll Find Each Other"	4:51
26.	"Fully Uploaded"	1:15
27.	"A Vision Restored"	0:23
28.	"Hanging Out"	1:59
29.	"Middle School"	4:26
30.	"New Friends" (with Dave Bayley)	1:41
31.	"Sunshine" (sung by Liam Payne)	2:44
32.	"A Quirk in the System"	3:18
Total length:		68:46

== Release ==
The soundtrack was released digitally on October 15, 2021, by Hollywood Records, making this the first 20th Century Studios animated feature film to have the film's soundtrack album released through the two musical record labels. It also had a physical release on October 22, the same day as the film's theatrical release and also a vinyl edition is scheduled for release later. A single titled "Sunshine" performed by Liam Payne, was earlier released as a music video format on August 27, 2021, for promotional purposes. The video featured silhouettes from the film, and a vocal performance by Payne. It was released as an official audio format on September 24, by Capitol Records.

== Critical reception ==
Nathan Diaz of Post Credit wrote "The score from Henry Jackman is electrifying. It blends traditional classical music with EDM and rock beats. This mixture leads to the soundtrack that captures the essence seamlessly." SLUG Magazine-based Patrick Gibbs wrote "The first rate musical score by Jackman, expertly moves between comically bouncy, rousingly adventurous and quietly touching, and it's one of the year's best." In a more critical review for the film, Associated Press based Mark Kennedy criticised the original song "Sunshine" by Liam Payne as a "pale imitation of Maroon 5's song".

== Personnel ==
Credits adapted from Tidal.

=== Technical ===
- Composer: Henry Jackman
- Additional music composers: Alex Kovacs, Anthony Willis, Halli Cauthery
- Additional arrangements: Maverick Dugger
- Music editors: Christoph Bauschinger, Paul John Chandler, Jack Dolman
- Score editor: John Traunwieser
- Score conductor: Matt Dunkley
- Score engineer: Chris Fogel, Nick Wollage
- Technical engineer: Felipe Pacheco
- Music mixing: Alan Meyerson
- Assistant mixing: Colby Donaldson
- Music executive: Patrick Houlihan
- Music preparation: Jill Streater, Dan Boardman
- Music consultant: Michelle De Vries
- Music production services: Matthew K. Justmann
- Music clearance: Ellen Ginsburg

=== Musicians ===
- Viola: Daniel Bhattacharya, Richard Cookson
- Violin: Marianne Haynes, Tom Pigott Smith, Patrick Savage
- Cello: Tanjeeb Khan, Masoud Sepah
- Piano: Jackey Mishra
- Double bass: Roger Linley, Laurence Ungless

=== Orchestra ===
- Orchestra: Isobel Griffiths Ltd.
- Orchestra contractor: Jenny Nendick
- Concertmaster: Everton Nelson
- Lead orchestrator: Stephen Coleman
- Sub-orchestrators: Andrew Kinney, Edward Trybek, Henri Wilkinson, Michael J. Lloyd
- Assistant orchestators: Benjamin Hoff, Jamie Thierman, Jonathan Beard, Sean Barrett
