= Waldo Fernandez =

Cuban-American interior designer

Waldo Fernandez is a Los Angeles–based interior designer and principal in Waldo's Designs.

== Personal life ==
Fernandez was born in Havana, Cuba, and moved with his family to New York City when he was a teenager. His father was a mechanical engineer and his mother had a flair for design.

While a student in architecture and design at UCLA, Fernandez worked for Academy Award–winning set designer Walter M. Scott on motion pictures such as Planet of the Apes and Doctor Dolittle. His first interior design project was decorating a house for award-winning director John Schlesinger, 1974. This marked the beginning of Waldo's Designs, located in West Hollywood.

Fernandez has homes in Beverly Hills, Manhattan, and East Hampton, New York.

== Work ==
Fernandez client roster has included top names in media and entertainment, including actors Brad Pitt, Will Smith and Elizabeth Taylor, movie executive Brian Grazer, chef Wolfgang Puck, real estate developer Rick Caruso, and songwriter Carole Bayer Sager.

He designed the Architectural Digest Greenroom at the 84th Annual Academy Awards®, in Hollywood.

== Awards and recognition ==
Waldo's Designs was named to the Architectural Digest AD100 in 2012 and in 2014.
