= Christopher Markus and Stephen McFeely =

American screenwriters and producers

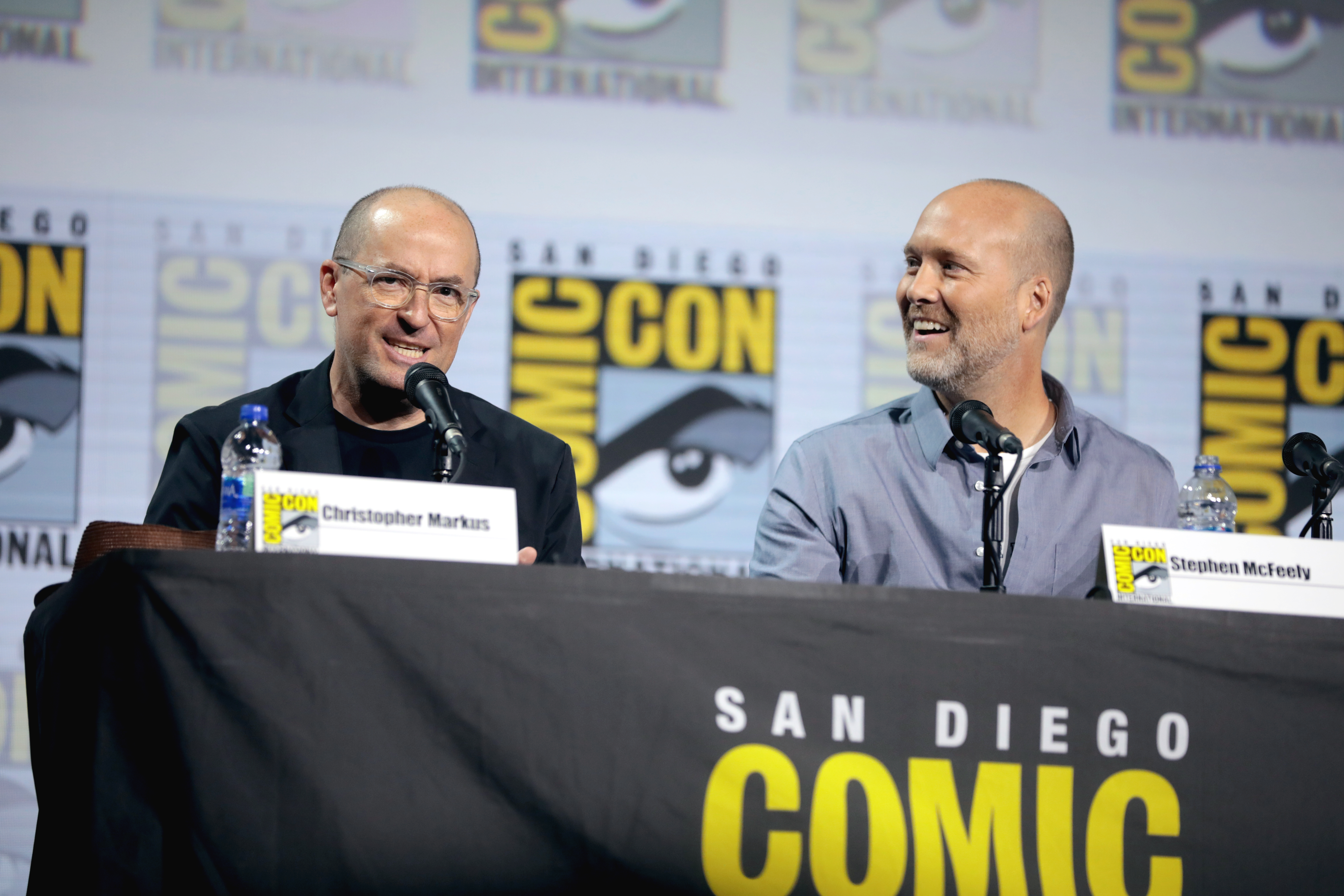
- Markus and McFeely in 2019
- Born: Markus: October 16, 1969 (age 56); Buffalo, New York, U.S. McFeely: February 24, 1970 (age 56); Walnut Creek, California, U.S.
- Education: Markus: Rutgers University; McFeely: University of Notre Dame; Both: University of California, Davis
- Occupations: Screenwriters; producers
- Years active: 2004–present
- Spouse: Markus: Claire Saunders (m. 2011)

Christopher Markus (born October 16, 1969) and Stephen McFeely (born February 24, 1970) are American screenwriters and producers. They are the first and second most successful screenwriters of all time in terms of U.S. box office receipts, with a shared total gross of $3.175 billion.

They gained worldwide recognition for their works that include The Chronicles of Narnia film franchise and the Marvel Cinematic Universe (MCU), having written the first three Captain America films (The First Avenger, The Winter Soldier and Civil War), in addition to Thor: The Dark World, Avengers: Infinity War, and Avengers: Endgame, which is currently the highest-grossing film of all time unadjusted for inflation. They also created ABC's Agent Carter TV series, set in the MCU.

== Early life, family and education ==
=== Christopher Markus ===
Markus was born on October 16, 1969, in Buffalo, New York. He is the son of Budapest, Hungary-born physician Dr. Gabor Markus and registered nurse Rosemary Golebiewski Markus. He has two siblings, sisters Jennifer and Elizabeth. Markus earned a B.A. in creative writing from Rutgers University in 1991. His father is Jewish while his mother is Catholic. As of April 2012, Markus was married to Claire Saunders.

=== Stephen McFeely ===
McFeely was born on February 24, 1970, in Walnut Creek, California, and grew up in the San Francisco Bay Area. He earned a B.A. in English from the University of Notre Dame in 1991.

== Career ==
=== Collaboration ===
Markus and McFeely met on the graduate program for creative writing at the University of California, Davis in 1994. They were inspired to become novelists. "We couldn't see how we could make [book] writing our full-time day job," McFeely said in 2011, and they turned to screenwriting instead. After earning their master's degrees in 1996, they moved to Los Angeles to pursue that career, working at such jobs as receptionist at movie production companies. After acquiring an agent, they became professional screenwriters in 1998 with an eventually unproduced script about a real-life Los Angeles murder. Interest generated from the purchased script led HBO Films to commission them to write a biographical drama about actor Peter Sellers. For The Life and Death of Peter Sellers in 2004, they won a Primetime Emmy Award for Outstanding Writing for a Miniseries, Movie or a Dramatic Special. Subsequent work on The Chronicles of Narnia film franchise set them up for the Marvel Cinematic Universe.

They wrote 2022's The Gray Man starring Ryan Gosling and Chris Evans and The Electric State starring Millie Bobby Brown and Chris Pratt. McFeely is also set to co-write the upcoming MCU films Avengers: Doomsday (2026) and Avengers: Secret Wars (2027) with Michael Waldron, Chris McKenna, and Erik Sommers, while Markus would continue to run AGBO, the Russo brothers' production company.

== Filmography ==
=== Film ===
Year	Title	Director	Notes
2004	The Life and Death of Peter Sellers	Stephen Hopkins	
2005	The Chronicles of Narnia: The Lion, the Witch and the Wardrobe	Andrew Adamson	
2007	You Kill Me	John Dahl	
2008	The Chronicles of Narnia: Prince Caspian	Andrew Adamson	
2010	The Chronicles of Narnia: The Voyage of the Dawn Treader	Michael Apted	
2011	Captain America: The First Avenger	Joe Johnston	1st collaboration with Marvel Studios
2013	Pain & Gain	Michael Bay	
2013	Thor: The Dark World	Alan Taylor	
2014	Captain America: The Winter Soldier	Anthony and Joe Russo	
2016	Captain America: Civil War	Anthony and Joe Russo	
2018	Avengers: Infinity War	Anthony and Joe Russo	
2019	Avengers: Endgame	Anthony and Joe Russo	Also co-producers
2022	The Gray Man	Anthony and Joe Russo	Also executive producers
2025	The Electric State	Anthony and Joe Russo	Also executive producers
2026	Avengers: Doomsday	Anthony and Joe Russo	Stephen McFeely only

Acting roles

Year	Title	Role	Notes
2014	Captain America: The Winter Soldier	SHIELD Interrogators	
2018	Avengers: Infinity War	Secretary Ross' Aide	Stephen McFeely only

=== Television ===
Year	Title	Writers	Producers	Creators	Notes
1999–2000	Good vs Evil	Yes	No	No	Episode "M Is for Morlock"
2015–2016	Agent Carter	Yes	Yes	Yes	
