= The Gray Man (2022 film) =

2022 American film by Anthony and Joe Russo

- Promotional poster
- Directed by: Anthony Russo; Joe Russo
- Screenplay by: Joe Russo; Christopher Markus Stephen McFeely
- Based on: The Gray Man by Mark Greaney
- Produced by: Joe Russo; Anthony Russo; Joe Roth; Jeff Kirschenbaum; Mike Larocca; Chris Castaldi
- Starring: Ryan Gosling; Chris Evans; Ana de Armas; Jessica Henwick; Regé-Jean Page; Wagner Moura; Julia Butters; Dhanush; Alfre Woodard; Billy Bob Thornton
- Cinematography: Stephen F. Windon
- Edited by: Jeff Groth; Pietro Scalia
- Music by: Henry Jackman
- Production companies: AGBO; Roth/Kirschenbaum Films
- Distributed by: Netflix
- Release date: July 15, 2022
- Running time: 129 minutes
- Country: United States
- Language: English
- Budget: $200 million
- Box office: $454,023

The Gray Man is a 2022 American action thriller film directed by Anthony and Joe Russo, from a screenplay Joe Russo co-wrote with Christopher Markus and Stephen McFeely, based on the 2009 novel of the same name by Mark Greaney. The film stars Ryan Gosling, Chris Evans, Ana de Armas, Jessica Henwick, Regé-Jean Page, Wagner Moura, Julia Butters, Dhanush (in his Hollywood debut), Alfre Woodard, and Billy Bob Thornton. Produced by the Russo brothers' company AGBO, it is the first film in a franchise based upon Greaney's Gray Man novels. The plot centers on CIA agent "Sierra Six" (portrayed by Gosling), who is on the run from sociopathic ex-CIA agent and mercenary Lloyd Hansen (Evans) upon discovering corrupt secrets about his superior.

An adaptation of Greaney's novel was originally announced in 2011, with James Gray set to direct Brad Pitt, and later Charlize Theron in a gender-swapped role, though neither version ever came to fruition. The property lingered in development hell until July 2020, when it was announced the Russo brothers would direct, with both Gosling and Evans attached to star. Filming took place in Los Angeles, Paris and Prague between March and July 2021. With a production budget of $200 million, it is among the most expensive films made by Netflix.

The Gray Man began a limited theatrical release on July 15, 2022, followed by its digital release on Netflix on July 22, 2022. It received mixed reviews from critics, with praise for the ensemble cast and action sequences, but criticism toward the "clichéd script and breakneck pacing." The film is being followed by a sequel, with Gosling and Dhanush reprising their roles, as well as a spin-off.

== Plot ==
In 2003, senior CIA official Donald Fitzroy visits a prisoner named Courtland Gentry in Florida. Eight years earlier, Courtland was a minor convicted of killing his abusive father to protect his brother. Fitzroy offers him his freedom in exchange for working as an assassin in the CIA's Sierra program, an elite black ops unit, which will allow him to exist in the gray.

In 2021, Courtland, now known as "Sierra Six", is working with fellow CIA agent Dani Miranda to assassinate a target named Dining Car suspected of selling off national security secrets in Bangkok during the national Songkran festival. Unable to do so stealthily without harming civilians, he attacks Dining Car directly, mortally wounding him. Before dying, he reveals he was also in the Sierra program as Sierra Four. He hands Six an encrypted drive detailing the corruption of CIA official Denny Carmichael, the lead agent on the assassination mission.

Carmichael is elusive about the true purpose of the mission and the contents of the drive when confronted by Six, and Six refuses evacuation from Bangkok with Carmichael's men. Sending the drive to former Sierra Program handler Margaret Cahill in Prague, he calls a now-retired Fitzroy to request extraction.

Carmichael hires mercenary Lloyd Hansen, a former CIA agent kicked out for his sociopathic tendencies, to track down Six and retrieve the drive. Lloyd does so by kidnapping Fitzroy's niece Claire, forcing Fitzroy to authorize Six's murder by the extraction team. However, Six kills them and escapes.

Frustrated, Carmichael sends his subordinate Suzanne Brewer to oversee Lloyd and keep him in line. Lloyd keeps Claire hostage in a mansion in Croatia, at his base of operations. He also puts a massive bounty on Six's head to get mercenaries and assassins to hunt him down.

Six heads to Vienna to find the serial number of Claire's pacemaker from Laszlo Sosa, but he betrays him for the bounty. Six escapes from Sosa's entrapment just as Lloyd arrives with his team and kills Sosa, while Six kills all of Lloyd's teammates and is rescued by Miranda from Lloyd. Her reputation is shot thanks to the Bangkok mission and she initially plans to bring him in to salvage her CIA career.

Six convinces her to drive him to Cahill's apartment in Prague, where she decrypts the drive. It reveals the extent of Carmichael's corruption on behalf of a mysterious benefactor working for a shadow government. Lloyd sends several teams of assassins to Cahill, and a terminally ill Cahill blows up her home, so Six and Miranda can escape.

Six is arrested and handcuffed in the square. A massive shootout in Prague results in all the police officers present slaughtered and Six escapes on a tram. After a long chase and gun battle, Six is once again saved by Miranda, in Cahill's bulletproof car. They infiltrate a hospital to track down Claire through her pacemaker's wireless signal.

Subsequently, an Indian Tamil mercenary, code-named "Lone Wolf", hired by Lloyd, tracks and overcomes Six and Miranda, retrieves the drive, and then brings it to Lloyd for the offered bounty. Six and Miranda follow the mercenary to Lloyd's base. She creates a distraction while he infiltrates the mansion rescuing Fitzroy and Claire. Mortally wounded as they flee, Fitzroy sacrifices himself, attempting to kill Lloyd. Miranda manages to reclaim the drive after Lone Wolf, disgusted by Lloyd's sociopathy and amoral tendencies, surrenders the drive to her before leaving.

Lloyd takes Claire hostage and drags her into a hedge maze. After a standoff, he lets go of Claire and fights with Six. Before Six can kill him, Suzanne shoots Lloyd dead. She then tells Six that she plans to pin Carmichael's actions on Lloyd to gain leverage over him. Furthermore, Suzanne pledges for Claire's safety, but only if Six continues to work for the CIA.

Six and Miranda are forced to cooperate in the cover-up, where ultimately no action is taken against Carmichael. After the debriefing at the CIA headquarters, Miranda threatens to kill Carmichael if any harm comes to Claire. Six escapes custody and after a shootout in which the fates of Carmichael and Suzanne are left unresolved, he rescues Claire and the two of them drive away to an unknown location.

== Cast ==
- Ryan Gosling as Courtland Gentry ("Sierra Six")
- Cameron Crovetti as Young Sierra Six
- Chris Evans as Lloyd Hansen
- Ana de Armas as Dani Miranda
- Billy Bob Thornton as Donald Fitzroy
- Jessica Henwick as Suzanne Brewer
- Regé-Jean Page as Denny Carmichael
- Wagner Moura as Laszlo Sosa
- Julia Butters as Claire Fitzroy, Fitzroy’s niece
- Dhanush as Avik San ("Lone Wolf") (Note: Though the character is credited as "Avik San", that name is never mentioned in the narrative.)
- Alfre Woodard as Margaret Cahill

In addition, Callan Mulvey appears as Dining Car ("Sierra Four") at the start of the film, setting the plot in motion whilst Shea Whigham appeared as Six's father in flashbacks. Robert Kazinsky and DeObia Oparei appear as Perini and Dulin respectively, two henchmen.

== Production ==
=== Development ===
The project was first set up at New Regency, with James Gray set to direct a screenplay written by Adam Cozad in January 2011. Brad Pitt was initially cast to star, but by October 2015 he and Gray were no longer involved with the film. Charlize Theron entered talks to star in a gender-swapped version of the film at Sony Pictures, with Anthony and Joe Russo writing the screenplay.

=== Casting ===
No further development was announced until July 2020, when the Russo brothers were announced to direct the film, from a screenplay by Joe Russo, Christopher Markus and Stephen McFeely, with additional material written by Anna Gregory, Charles Leavitt, Rhett Reese, Joe Schrapnel, and Paul Wernick, for Netflix, to spawn a franchise. Ryan Gosling and Chris Evans were cast to star in the film. In December, Ana de Armas, Jessica Henwick, Wagner Moura, Julia Butters and Dhanush were added to the cast. Regé-Jean Page, Billy Bob Thornton, Alfre Woodard, Eme Ikwuakor, and Scott Haze joined the cast in March 2021. An April article about shooting in Prague had Michael Gandolfini included in the cast. In May 2021, DeObia Oparei joined the cast of the film.

=== Filming ===
Filming was to commence on January 18, 2021, in Long Beach, California, but was pushed back to March 1. Page wrapped his role within the first month of shooting. It filmed in Europe in the spring, with locations including Prague, Czech Republic, the Château de Chantilly in France, and Croatia. Filming in Prague took place from June 27, 2021. Filming wrapped on July 31, 2021.

At a budget over $200 million, The Gray Man is one of Netflix's most expensive original films.

== Soundtrack ==
The film's score was composed by Henry Jackman, who previously collaborated with the Russos on several of their films. Jackman began writing the score in December 2021, beginning with a 17-minute-long suite.

== Release ==
The Gray Man began a limited theatrical release on July 15, 2022, followed by its release on Netflix on July 22, 2022. Though Netflix does not report theatrical grosses for its titles, distribution insiders estimated the film made around $200,000 from about 400 theaters in its opening weekend. IndieWire estimated the film made $300,000–375,000 over its first full week of theatrical release.

== Reception ==
=== Viewership ===
Netflix reported the film was streamed for a total of 88.55 million hours over its first three days, which would equal around 43.55 million viewers. It was the most-watched film in 84 countries. By September the film had totalled 253.8 million hours viewed.

=== Critical response ===
On the review aggregator website Rotten Tomatoes, 45% of 276 critics' reviews are positive, with an average rating of 5.5/10. The website's consensus reads: "The Gray Man has the star-studded outline of an entertaining action thriller, but it's filled in with lukewarm leftovers from far better films." Metacritic, which uses a weighted average, assigned the film a score of 49 out of 100, based on 55 critics, indicating "mixed or average" reviews.

== Accolades ==
The film was nominated for Outstanding Supporting Visual Effects in a Photoreal Feature at the 21st Visual Effects Society Awards.

== Future ==
=== Sequel ===
Scott Stuber, head of original films on Netflix, expressed his interest in future Gray Man films, saying: "We're excited to continue to partner with the Russo brothers and the team at AGBO as they build The Gray Man universe." After the film's debut weekend, a sequel was announced with Gosling, Dhanush, and the Russo brothers returning to their respective roles.

=== Spin-off ===
A spin-off film, which will explore a different element of The Gray Man universe, will be written by Paul Wernick and Rhett Reese. The Russo brothers stated that they were considering making a spin-off film about Dhanush's character Avik San (The Lone Wolf).
