= The Hard Line =

2026 novel by Mark Greaney

- First edition cover
- Author: Mark Greaney
- Audio read by: Jay Snyder
- Language: English
- Series: The Gray Man
- Release number: 15
- Genre: Thriller
- Publisher: Berkley Publishing Group
- Publication date: February 17, 2026
- Publication place: United States
- Media type: Print (hardback & paperback)
- Pages: 478
- ISBN: 978-0-593-95481-2
- Preceded by: Midnight Black
- Followed by: Dark Union

The Hard Line is an action thriller novel by American author Mark Greaney. It is the fifteenth book in the Gray Man series, featuring assassin and CIA operative Court Gentry. It was preceded by Midnight Black (2025). The novel follows Gentry as he is tasked with stopping a series of attacks on U.S. intelligence personnel while being hunted by a vengeful former assassin.

The book was released on February 17, 2026, by Berkley Books. It debuted at number three on the New York Times bestseller list.

== Plot ==
In Varna, Bulgaria, Court Gentry unsuccessfully seeks out a mob boss to help him infiltrate Russia, (Note: As depicted in Midnight Black) which ends in a gunfight. Gentry kills the Bulgarian gangster as well as his Northern Irish bodyguard Charlie Coyle, whose estranged father Campbell is a former assassin known as Whetstone. When he finds out about his son's death, he seeks out his killer.

Two months later, Gentry is tasked by his boss Matthew Hanley with extracting a CIA asset from Nicaragua. They find themselves ambushed by a pair of Chinese intelligence (MSS) operatives, whom Gentry kills. This forces MSS agent Gao Yuanyuan (alias Gracie Wu) to accelerate the timeline for Operation Marigold, a series of assassinations of intelligence personnel on U.S. soil. Gao recruits politician James Arthur “J.W.” Westwood III and private military company Gauntlet Group's senior operations officer Michael “Big Mike” Scardino to hire freelance assassins, which include Scott Kincaid (codename Lancer) and Coyle. Both try to seek information on Gentry, although Coyle settles for information on Hanley instead.

Hanley's new off-the-books direct action team Ghost Town, whose operatives include Gentry, his former team leader Zack Hightower, and former CIA paramilitary officer Chris Travers, is assigned to find the mole responsible for the ambush in Nicaragua as well as similar attacks in Tunis and Addis Ababa. They surveil Office of the Director of National Intelligence (ODNI) employee Irene Ortega in Washington, D.C. Later that night, Operation Marigold commences. Belarusian assassin Alexi Kravchuk (codename Spiral and Deep Space) tries to kill Ortega in her apartment but is stopped by Gentry, while Hightower and Travers kill Gauntlet contractors hired as Kravchuk's interdiction and isolation team. Ortega informs Hanley that she is being set up by her ODNI colleague Lewis Shaw, who is the actual mole.

Meanwhile, Coyle breaks into Hanley's home and leaves a note for Gentry. Court calls Campbell, who threatens him with killing more intelligence employees unless they meet. Gentry learns from his former handler Sir Donald Fitzroy that Coyle is the son of notorious IRA operative Rory Coyle and was an MI5 asset at one point. The next day, Hanley obtains Kravchuk's kill list, which includes a Gauntlet pilot about to be interviewed by former Washington Post reporter Catherine King (Note: King had previously appeared in Back Blast and Burner) at a Georgetown restaurant. He assigns Gentry and Hightower with extracting King after the pilot is assassinated. The two fight off Gauntlet men and Jordanian assassin Asem Shaban (codename Snare), who is killed by CIA senior operations officer Jim Pace.

Westwood and Scardino press Shaw for more information on Ghost Town and find out about Gentry and Hightower. They assign Kincaid with eliminating Hightower in Boulder, Colorado, and task Coyle with killing Gentry's father James in Glen St. Mary, Florida. Hanley learns about the breach and informs Gentry, who decides to go to Boulder first. Kincaid finds out about Hightower keeping tabs on his biological daughter Stacy, who is living in Boulder under witness protection as Andie Delaney, and kidnaps her at the Eldora Mountain Resort. After Hightower kills two of Kincaid's henchmen during an MRI appointment, Kincaid calls him and arranges a swap with Andie for Gentry, who put him in a Cuban prison months ago. (Note: As depicted in The Chaos Agent)

Having identified Kincaid's hideout in a remote cabin, Hightower meets and enlists the help of Andie's father Peter, a deputy fire chief. They storm the hideout with Gentry and rescue Andie, as Hightower kills Kincaid after a struggle. Afterwards, Gentry goes to Florida to pick up his father, only to find out that Coyle and his henchmen had also arrived there. They get into a gunfight at James's shoot house, where Coyle shoots Gentry's father dead.

Gentry goes to Northern Ireland to avenge his father and meets Coyle at his son's graveyard. They are interrupted by a group of schoolchildren arriving at the cemetery as Coyle leaves. Meanwhile, Ghost Town is taken off the mole hunt after Scardino kills Shaw; a cell of Russian military intelligence (GRU) assets is framed for the killings and eliminated by Gauntlet operators in Manhattan. Hanley tries to seek answers from CIA's deputy director of operations Trey Watkins about a possible conspiracy when they are attacked by an unknown party with an anti-tank rocket, killing Watkins and injuring Hanley. Learning about the attack after meeting with Coyle, Gentry also finds out that his brother Chance, thought to be dead, attended his father's funeral at Arlington National Cemetery.

== Characters ==
- Courtland Gentry: aka the Gray Man, aka Violator, aka Brian Webb, aka Six; Ghost Town asset; former CIA paramilitary operations (Ground Branch) officer
- Matthew Hanley: aka Pilgrim; director of Ghost Town; former deputy director for operations, CIA
- Zack Hightower: aka Night Train; Ghost Town asset; former CIA paramilitary operations (Ground Branch) officer
- Chris Travers: aka Teddy; Ghost Town asset; former CIA paramilitary operations (Ground Branch) officer
- Erin Childers: aka Conductor; Ghost Town assistant to the director
- Jill Mori: aka Gumdrop; Ghost Town intelligence analyst
- Arnold Reyes: aka Bricklayer; Ghost Town logistics coordinator
- Angela Lacy: senior operations officer, CIA
- Jim Pace: operations officer, CIA
- William “Trey” Watkins: deputy director for operations, CIA
- Olivia Anthony: director of national intelligence
- Chadwick Phillips: director of the Central Intelligence Agency (CIA)
- Michael “Big Mike” Scardino: senior operations officer for Gauntlet Group Inc.
- James Arthur “J.W” Westwood III: director of the Raymond C. Carter Center for Trends in Peace
- Gao Yuanyuan: aka Gracie Wu; field agent, Chinese Ministry of State Security
- Lewis Shaw: IT systems analyst, Office of the Director of National Intelligence (ODNI)
- Irene Ortega: mission integration specialist, ODNI
- Roderick “Rory” Coyle: operative, Provisional Irish Republican Army; father of Campbell Coyle
- Charlie Coyle: security contractor; father of Ronan Coyle
- Campbell Coyle: aka Whetstone; father of Charlie Coyle; freelance assassin from Northern Ireland
- Alexi Kravchuk: aka Spiral, aka Deep Space; freelance assassin from Belarus
- Scott Kincaid: aka Lancer; freelance assassin from the USA
- Asem Shaban: aka Snare; freelance assassin from Jordan
- Marcus Maragos: Greek international security consultant
- Andrea “Andie” Delaney: café employee, competitive snowboarder
- Peter Delaney: deputy fire chief, Boulder Fire and Rescue; father of Andie
- James Gentry: retired firearms instructor; father of Courtland Gentry
- Stanley “Skip” Echols: private investigator from Jacksonville, Florida
- Catherine King: author; former lead national security reporter for the Washington Post

== Development ==
In an interview with Rome News-Tribune, Greaney said about the novel's theme of revenge: "It’s something that my editor and I have talked about for a long time, the kind of human cost of this. I like to make my stories as visceral as I can make them, and you see wounds, and there are effects of the battles and the action. But I also think about the psychological tolls — and the tolls that this would have on people."

== Release ==
The Hard Line is scheduled to be released and publishing date by Berkley Publishing Group in the United States on February 17, 2026.

== Reception ==
The Hard Line debuted at number three at the Combined Print and E-Book Fiction category of the New York Times bestseller list for the week of March 8, 2026, making it Greaney's tenth top 10 novel in the Gray Man series. It also debuted at number four on the Hardcover Fiction category of the same list.

Kirkus Reviews praised the book as "action-packed" and "fun for fans of fictional mayhem".
