= Burner (novel) =

2023 novel by Mark Greaney

- First edition cover
- Author: Mark Greaney
- Audio read by: Jay Snyder
- Language: English
- Series: The Gray Man
- Release number: 12
- Genre: Thriller
- Publisher: Berkley Publishing Group
- Publication date: February 21, 2023
- Publication place: United States
- Media type: Print (hardback & paperback)
- Pages: 512
- ISBN: 978-0-593-54810-3
- Preceded by: Sierra Six
- Followed by: The Chaos Agent

Burner is an action thriller novel by Mark Greaney, published on February 21, 2023, by Berkley Books. It is the twelfth book in the Gray Man series, featuring assassin and former CIA operative Court Gentry. The novel follows Gentry and his partner Zoya Zakharova as they separately track down a Ukrainian banker on the run from the Russian government. It debuted at number five on the New York Times bestseller list.

== Plot ==
In Zurich, Switzerland, Ukrainian banker Alexander Velesky is approached by Russian financial planner Igor Krupkin. He gives him one of two iPhones with data showing the Russian government funding illegal operations in the West through shell companies. Krupkin asks him to cross-reference some of the data with cryptocurrency transaction records from Velesky's bank, which the banker later uploads to a website on the Dark Web. He writes down the web address and mails it to forensic accountant Ezra Altman in New York City.

Russian Security Council director Daniil Spanov tasks Swiss fixer Sebastian Drexler (Note: Drexler had previously appeared in Agent in Place) and Russian military intelligence (GRU) major Luka Rudenko with recovering the stolen data. Rudenko tortures and kills Krupkin before meeting with Drexler. He also kidnaps Velesky, killing a CIA officer also after the phone. They are ambushed by freelance mercenary Zoya Zakharova, who is working on behalf of a competing Swiss bank looking for the transaction records Velesky had stolen from his employers. She captures Velesky and puts him in a hideout in the Wengen mountain village with other freelance mercenaries hired by her French broker Broussard.

Former CIA contract agent and Zoya's former lover Court Gentry takes on a freelance job blowing up yachts owned by Russian oligarchs along the Caribbean Sea. He is contacted by CIA assistant to the deputy director of operations Suzanne Brewer through senior operations officer Angela Lacy. Brewer tasks him with retrieving a second iPhone that Krupkin had sent to offshore banking lawyer Eddison John in nearby Saint Lucia, believing it to contain classified information about CIA operations in Russia. Gentry makes contact with Eddison just as Rudenko parachutes into his property; he overhears the lawyer telling Court that he had hidden the phone in his office. Rudenko manages to secure the phone after a car chase with Gentry. Brewer instructs Gentry and Lacy to proceed to Switzerland and track down Velesky instead.

While in captivity, Velesky tells Zoya about the phone and the bank records. They are later double crossed by Broussard to GRU agents sent by Drexler, but Zoya manages to kill them all. She agrees to accompany Velesky to New York City, stopping at her place in Milan, Italy. They take a train to Geneva, Switzerland, where they separately get flagged by Rudenko's colleague Ulan Bakiyev, who learns of Zoya's identity as a former Russian foreign intelligence (SVR) operative with a kill order from her employers, and Lacy, who tells Gentry about GRU operatives hunting for Velesky inside the train. Rudenko and his men as well as Gentry both enter the train and engage in a three-way gunfight with Zoya. With Bakiyev dead, Rudenko narrowly escapes after having his foot shot by Gentry, who later briefly recognizes Zoya before Velesky pushes him off the moving train. Lacy catches up to Velesky, who tells him about the phone's contents before he and Zoya also escape.

Lacy demands answers from Brewer, who is later ordered by CIA director Jay Kirby to meet Drexler in Washington, D.C. She finds herself working with Drexler to capture Velesky in New York City, where a trade summit aiming to reinstate Russia's most favoured nation status with the World Trade Organization is taking place. Gentry, who had survived the fall from the train by wearing an alpine airbag vest, teams up with Lacy (who had lied to Brewer about his supposed death) and reunites with Zoya, who had arrived in New York to accompany Velesky to Altman's office. Fearful about being surveilled, Altman provides Velesky with his home address and a burner phone for communication.

Court and Zoya infiltrate Altman's house later that night to give him the phone. Brewer, working with Drexler, finds out about Velesky's meeting with Altman, leading Rudenko and his men to storm Altman's house with a sleeper cell of pro-Russian separatists from Ukraine. Gentry rescues Altman, although Rudenko kidnaps his family and puts them with the Ukrainians in a safehouse in New Jersey. Deducing that Gentry had survived and is working with Lacy, Brewer also finds out that Kirby is on the Russians' payroll.

The next day, Court, Zoya and Lacy pinpoint the Altman family's location, as Velesky accompanies Altman to his office to compile the data and send it to Washington Post journalist Catherine King. (Note: King had previously appeared in Back Blast) The Ukrainian separatists hand over the hostages to Rudenko and his men, who transport them to Teterboro Airport, where Court, Zoya and Lacy follow them. The separatists storm Altman's office and kill Velesky and later Altman, who nevertheless manages to email the files to King.

Court and Zoya storm the airport, where Drexler and Brewer had arrived. Court kills Rudenko after a struggle as Zoya rescues the hostages. She finds herself cornered by Brewer, who is then shot dead by Lacy. Court implores Lacy to let himself take the fall for Brewer's death, as she is later promoted within the CIA. While the trade summit is successful, King's report leads to resignations of politicians reported to be under the Kremlin's payroll, Spanov's death, and Kirby's resignation from the CIA, while the Ukrainian separatists are later arrested by the NYPD. Court and Zoya decide to stay together.

== Characters ==
- Courtland "Court" Gentry: aka the Gray Man, aka Violator, aka Sierra Six; a freelance intelligence asset; a former CIA contract officer; a former CIA Special Activities Division (Ground Branch) paramilitary operations officer
- Vitali Peskov: The president of the Russian Federation
- Eddison John: The attorney-at-law, Castries, Saint Lucia
- Daniil Spanov: The director of the Security Council, Russian Federation
- Igor Krupkin: The Russian financial planner
- Alexander Velesky: A banker for Brucker Söhne Holdings, Zurich, Switzerland
- Luka Rudenko: CIA code name Matador; The major GRU (Russian military intelligence), Unit 29155
- Ulan Bakiyev: The starshina (sergeant major), GRU (Russian military intelligence), Unit 29155
- Ezra Altman: The American forensic accountant
- Petro Mozgovoy: The intelligence officer, Donetsk People's Republic Security Service Battalion
- Henry Calvin: The attorney, Hartley, Hill, and Prescott, LLC, New York City
- Sebastian Drexler: The Swiss freelance intelligence asset
- Angela Lacy: The senior operations officer, Directorate of Operations, CIA
- Suzanne Brewer: The special assistant to the deputy director for operations, CIA
- Jay Kirby: The director, CIA
- Zoya Zakharova: code name Banshee; the freelance intelligence asset; former SVR (Russian foreign intelligence) operative; former CIA contract asset

== Development ==
Burner was inspired by the Russian invasion of Ukraine in 2022. In an interview with WECT, Greaney said: "It’s not a war novel. It’s an espionage novel. Not one page takes place inside Ukraine. But the Kremlin’s dealings around the world is at the backdrop of it. So I spent last spring and summer trying to figure out where the world would be next February and writing a book about it."

== Reception ==
=== Commercial ===
Burner debuted at number five at the Combined Print and E-Book Fiction category of the New York Times bestseller list for the week of March 12, 2023, making it Greaney's seventh top 10 novel in the Gray Man series. It also debuted at number seven on the Hardcover Fiction category of the same list.

=== Critical ===
Kirkus Reviews praised the book: "Hardcore action here. Greaney and the Gray Man are on their game." Thriller novel reviewer The Real Book Spy hails Greaney, stating that the author "delivers another heat-seeking thrill ride that’s not to be missed".
