= Mission Critical (disambiguation) =

A mission critical factor of a system is any factor that is essential to its operation.

Mission Critical may also refer to:

- Mission Critical (novel), a 2019 novel by Mark Greaney
- Mission Critical (video game), a 1995 DOS adventure game
- Mission Critical, a type of Operating Environment for HP-UX
