= Deadeye (disambiguation) =

A deadeye is an item used in the standing and running rigging of traditional sailing ships.

Deadeye or dead eye may also refer to:

== Arts and entertainment ==
- Deadeye (Amalgam Comics), a comic book character from Amalgam Comics
- Deadeye (DC Comics), various characters from DC Comics
- The Dead Eye, an album by The Haunted
- "Deadeye", a song by New Model Army
- Dead Eye (novel), a 2013 novel by Mark Greaney
- Dead-Eye Dick, a character in the folk ballad "The Ballad of Eskimo Nell"
- The title character of Deadeye Dick, a 1982 novel by Kurt Vonnegut
- Deadeye Duck, a fictional four-armed duck in the Bucky O'Hare comic book series
- Dead-Eye, a character from the fifth season of Once Upon a Time
- The title character of the 1975 musical film Dick Deadeye, or Duty Done
- "Dead Eye", an episode of Ghost Whisperer
- A gameplay mechanic in the Red Dead series
- Grifter (character), a comic book character also known as Deadeye

== Other uses ==
- A very skilled and accurate marksman.
- Deadeye, nickname of American ten-pin bowler Walter Ray Williams Jr. (born 1959)
- Dead eye (drink), a mix of coffee and espresso

== See also ==
- Philip H. Ross (1905–1981), World War II US Navy submarine commander nicknamed "Deadeye Phil"
