= Gunmetal Gray =

2017 novel by Mark Greaney

- First edition cover
- Author: Mark Greaney
- Audio read by: Jay Snyder
- Language: English
- Series: The Gray Man
- Release number: 6
- Genre: Thriller
- Publisher: Berkley Publishing Group
- Publication date: February 14, 2017
- Publication place: United States
- Media type: Print (hardback & paperback)
- Pages: 494
- ISBN: 978-0-451-48973-9
- Preceded by: Back Blast
- Followed by: Agent in Place

Gunmetal Gray is an action thriller novel by Mark Greaney, published on February 14, 2017 by Berkley Books. It is the sixth book in the Gray Man series, featuring assassin and CIA operative Court Gentry. It was preceded by Back Blast and followed by Agent in Place. The novel features Gentry on his first contract job back at the CIA, which involves extracting a rogue Chinese hacker on the run from his former employers.

It debuted at number ten at the New York Times bestseller list, making it the first Gray Man book to chart on the list.

== Plot ==
Court Gentry goes to Hong Kong to track down Chinese hacker Fan Jiang, a member of PLA Unit 61398 who had gone rogue, on his first contract job with the CIA after clearing his name. After eliminating two Ministry of Defense (MOD) agents sent to surveil him, he inquires about his former handler Sir Donald Fitzroy, who was originally tasked by Unit 61398's security director Colonel Dai Longhai with capturing Fan. The first two teams Fitzroy had assigned to find the hacker were killed by the Wo Shing Wo triad, whom Fan had hired for protection; Colonel Dai takes Fitzroy hostage for his failure. After having Gentry brought in to see him, Colonel Dai hires him to capture and kill Fan.

Gentry follows up on Fan's last sighting at the island of Po Toi, where he finds out that the hacker had escaped to Vietnam and is now under the protection of the Con Ho Hoang Da (Wild Tigers), a Vietnamese crime syndicate. Unbeknownst to him, Russian foreign intelligence (SVR) officer Zoya Zakharova is also looking for Fan, and has also found his location. Court and Zoya separately proceed to Wild Tigers's headquarters in Ho Chi Minh City, but Colonel Dai sends MOD operatives to storm the building without consulting Gentry. Court ends up following a car with Wild Tigers leader Tu Van Duc, which flees into a Wild Tigers compound near the Cambodian border.

Gentry infiltrates the compound later that night and sees Zoya and her Zaslon paramilitary unit sneak in as well. He creates a diversion by opening fire, forcing Zoya's team into a firefight with the Wild Tigers as well as People's Army of Vietnam (PAVN) soldiers hired as extra protection for Fan. Court sees Fan escaping from the compound with Tu and a henchman and captures him, killing his protectors. Zoya is later burned by her superiors for failing to capture Fan. Desperate, she goes undercover in Thailand.

Fan tells Court the reasons for his defection as they proceed to Cambodia. He decided to run after his parents died in a car accident, making him a liability to Unit 61398 as he had no other next of kin to be used as their collateral. Major Song Julong, his parents's bodyguard, had arranged for Fan to be extracted by Taiwanese intelligence (NSB) at a border crossing towards Hong Kong, but they abandoned him after Colonel Dai started his manhunt and ordered Song killed. Court and Fan were later captured by Thai river pirates, but Court escapes, leaving Fan behind. He calls his handler Suzanne Brewer and asks her to exfiltrate him to the USS Boxer nearby.

Court goes to Bangkok, Thailand to resume his search for Fan after Brewer intercepts an encrypted message from the hacker to Taiwanese intelligence stating that he is captured by the Chamroon Syndicate, a Thai criminal organization. Gentry tries to capture one of its leaders, Nattapong Chamroon, in a nightclub, and informs Colonel Dai, who sends MOD operatives led by his second-in-command Major Xi. He orders them to storm the nightclub without informing Gentry, leading to a three-way gunfight with Chamroon gangsters as well as the Zaslon unit, now led by SVR officer Oleg Utkin. Court manages to rescue Nattapong and his call girls; one of them turns out to be Zoya, who takes the Thai gangster away from Court. Zoya learns from Nattapong that his brother Kulap is with Fan; after killing him, she joins the Zaslon team as they escape the nightclub with heavy losses. Zoya argues with Utkin about the failed operation and ends up killing him. Court witnesses Zoya as she exits the nightclub and follows her using a tracking device. He captures her and decides to enlist her help with finding Fan.

Court and Zoya go to the island of Phuket, where the Chamroon estate is located. They get close as they surveil the estate from a nearby hotel, and Court eventually recruits Zoya as a CIA asset. Meanwhile, Brewer intercepts an email from Fan to the U.S. embassy in Bangkok asking to be rescued from the estate. She assigns Gentry with taking care of Zoya, as a Special Activities Division Ground Branch unit is tasked to extract Fan later that night. Zoya and Court are then captured by Major Xi and brought to Colonel Dai, who supervises another attack at the estate and has brought Fitzroy with him. Fitzroy reveals to Gentry that he was originally contracted by MI6 to assassinate Song, a double agent working for the CIA, before he kills Fan's parents.

After Court reveals his identity as the Gray Man to Zoya, they deduce that Fan's email is a set-up since the hacker wanted to defect to Taiwan instead of the United States. They also pinpoint his likely location to a nearby yacht owned by the 'Ndrangheta, Kulap's business partners. Court and Zoya escape, leaving Fitzroy behind. Gentry tells Brewer to call off the Ground Branch team before joining Zoya as they infiltrate the yacht and rescue Fan. Meanwhile, Colonel Dai and his men are ambushed by Thai insurgents hired by Kulap at the estate.

Gentry calls Colonel Dai and arranges for a prisoner swap with Fan and Fitzroy. He disappears with Fan and leaves Zoya to be extracted by the Ground Branch team. Two days later, Court calls director of clandestine services Matthew Hanley, who confirms that Song was a CIA asset and that his predecessor Denny Carmichael had sanctioned his assassination of Fan's parents to ensure the hacker's defection. Brewer pinpoints Gentry's location to a hotel in Phang Nga and sends the Ground Branch unit, which ends up rescuing Fitzroy.

Three days later, Gentry enlists Fitzroy's help with securing Fan's move to Taiwan. However, they are both captured by the Ground Branch team and contract agent Zack Hightower after Gentry hands off Fan to NSB officers at an airport. Gentry learns from Brewer that Fan will be forced to defect to the United States since he is safer with them, and that Colonel Dai had also offered to defect to escape death back in China. After meeting with Zoya in Frankfurt, Germany before she leaves for Washington, D.C. to be turned into a CIA contract asset, Court goes off grid.

== Reception ==
=== Commercial ===
Gunmetal Gray debuted at number 10 at the Combined Print & E-Book Fiction category of the New York Times bestseller list, as well as number 11 at the Hardcover Fiction category of the same list. This is the first time a Gray Man novel has charted in the list.

=== Critical ===
The book received generally positive reviews. In a starred review, Kirkus Reviews praised the novel as "fat, fast, and fun". Carol Memmott of The Washington Post said: "Fans of RPG, Hong Kong action films and high-octane storytelling will love the Gray Man, who battles full-bore through this fast-paced series." In a starred review, Publishers Weekly hailed the novel as "outstanding" and added that "Gray Man fans will close the book happily fulfilled and eagerly awaiting his next adventure." Prominent literary reviewer The Real Book Spy remarked: "From start to finish, Gunmetal Gray impresses with a well-laid-out plot and enough action to satisfy even the pickiest thriller fans. Between the Clancy books and the Gray Man series, nobody is on a hotter streak right now than Mark Greaney."
