= H. Ripley Rawlings IV =

American novelist

Hunter "Rip" Rawlings IV
- Born: Boulder, Colorado
- Occupations: Author and veteran
- Notable work: Red Metal
- Father: Hunter R. Rawlings III
- Military career
- Allegiance: United States
- Branch: United States Marine Corps
- Rank: Lieutenant colonel
- Wars: War in Afghanistan

Lieutenant Colonel Hunter Ripley "Rip" Rawlings IV is the New York Times bestselling co-author (with Mark Greaney) of the military fiction novel Red Metal and a former United States Marine Corps officer.

== Early life, family and education ==
Hunter R. Rawlings IV was born in Boulder, Colorado. His father, Hunter R. Rawlings III, is the former President of Cornell University and his mother, Irene Rawlings, is a travel author and radio personality in Denver, Colorado. He is married with three children and lives outside Washington, D.C. Rawlings completed his first year of college at the Virginia Military Institute, then transferred to Hobart and William Smith Colleges, in Geneva, New York where he received degrees in English and German Literature. He holds a master's degree in Operational Planning from the Marine Corps' School of Advanced Warfighting, Marine Corps University and is a Fellow from the Massachusetts Institute of Technology (MIT) Seminar XXI program.

== Involvement in Ukraine ==
Shortly after the beginning of the 2022 Russian invasion of Ukraine, Rawlings created an organization, Ripley's Heroes, in order to network, raise funds, and provide nonlethal military gear and medical equipment to the soldiers fighting in front-line military units in Ukraine against the Russian armed forces. Ripley's Heroes is recognized as a 501(c)(3) tax-exempt organization.

Rawlings, along with other retired U.S. and U.K. military personnel, participated in military operations with the Ukrainian armed forces in Ukraine.  > Rawlings appeared before the U.S. Helsinki Commission in July 2022 to discuss Ukrainian equipment needs and logistical support.[8][9]

== Writing career ==
Rawlings began his writing career as a co-Author with Mark Greaney, the author of over fifteen works of thriller and espionage fiction. Rawlings' first book, Red Metal, released by Penguin Publishing House on 16 July 2019. It received bestseller status from the New York Times, USA Today and Amazon on its release week.

In August 2019, Rawlings signed a multiple book deal with Kensington Publishing of New York City for a military fiction series titled Assault by Fire. The novel takes place in the near future and involves citizens and remnant military fighters repelling a Russian invader and releases on 29 September 2020.

In March 2020, Rawlings announced via Twitter and Facebook that he had been contracted to continue his series with Kensington. The second installment has not been given a release date, but is to be entitled "The Kill Box" with the series called the "Tyce Asher" series named for the lead character, a Marine infantry Major with a prosthetic leg.

In August 2020, Mark Greaney and Rip Rawlings confirmed in interviews and on social media that they had been contracted to write another work of military fiction in the Red Metal series from publisher Penguin, Random house.

== Bibliography ==
- Red Metal (2019)
- Assault by Fire (2020)
- The Kill Box (2021)
