= Midnight Black =

2025 novel by Mark Greaney

- First edition cover
- Author: Mark Greaney
- Audio read by: Jay Snyder
- Language: English
- Series: The Gray Man
- Release number: 14
- Genre: Thriller
- Publisher: Berkley Publishing Group
- Publication date: February 18, 2025
- Publication place: United States
- Media type: Print (hardback & paperback)
- Pages: 506
- ISBN: 978-0-593-54818-9
- Preceded by: The Chaos Agent
- Followed by: The Hard Line

Midnight Black is an action thriller novel by Mark Greaney. It is the fourteenth book in Gray Man series, featuring assassin and former CIA operative Court Gentry. It was preceded by The Chaos Agent (2024) and followed by The Hard Line (2026). The novel follows Gentry as he infiltrates Russia to rescue his partner Zoya Zakharova.

The book was released on February 18, 2025, by Berkley Books. It debuted at number two on the New York Times bestseller list.

== Plot ==
Six months after former Russian foreign intelligence (SVR) officer Zoya Zakharova was captured in Cuba and extradited to her home country, (Note: As depicted in The Chaos Agent) her lover Court Gentry takes on a series of assassination jobs in eastern Europe in exchange for a way inside Russia. His former CIA boss Matthew Hanley convinces him to meet with Latvian podcaster Dr. Milda Berzina, who had helped smuggle CIA assets into the Soviet Union during the Cold War.

Meanwhile, Zoya is a prisoner at the IK-2 Yavas penal colony in Mordovia, where dissident Nadia Yarovaya is also incarcerated; Nadia's husband, opposition leader Natan Yarovoy, is imprisoned at the IK-17 Orzenyi penal colony nearby. Russian state security (FSB) major colonel Eriks Baronov plots to lure Gentry to Mordovia after Zoya had involuntarily told him about his identity during interrogation, intentionally leaking security footage of her sentencing at a court in Saransk to be intercepted by the CIA.

Gentry meets Berzina at her apartment in Riga, where he is spotted by a Russian military intelligence (GRU) surveillance team. GRU lieutenant colonel Karol Dvorak, who has been leading sabotage missions against NATO in eastern Europe, sends a Shark direct action unit to capture them. After Gentry goes back to rescue the podcaster, the two escape and unsuccessfully evade the Shark team in a nearby forest. Just then, a group of foreign contractors led by former CIA contract agent Zack Hightower, tasked by CIA senior operations officer Angela Lacy to capture Dvorak on behalf of dissident Russian oligarch Mikhail Sorkin's rebel organization New Russia Council, arrive and rescue Gentry and Berzina.

After dropping off Berzina in Tallinn, Estonia, Gentry lies low with Hightower and his team at a commune near Helsinki, Finland. Baronov informs Dvorak about Hightower's location through a spy in Sorkin's organization, allowing the latter to storm the commune with two Shark units and kill all of Hightower's men, although Gentry manages to dispatch some of the GRU operatives. Hightower captures Dvorak as he tries to get away and then parts ways with Gentry, who secures a ride at a container ship bound for the Russian border through the Gulf of Finland.

Gentry enters Russia under cover as a Nicaraguan diplomat. He proceeds to Moscow to meet with Berzina's contact Arkady Rubenov, whose granddaughter Katarina Orlova is one of the leaders of the Freedom of Russia Legion, a group of Russian resistance fighters. He is later discovered and pursued by FSB Alpha Group special forces sent by Baronov, but he manages to evade them after a chase at the Moscow Metro. Gentry meets with Orlova as well as Legion cell leader Denis Maskaev, who both agree to help him break out Zoya and Nadia from IK-2 Yavas.

Meanwhile, Hightower goes to the New Russia Council base in Poland, where Dvorak is interrogated and the FSB mole is discovered. He is tasked by Sorkin with training a special forces team made up of former Russian soldiers. Hanley later meets with Sorkin at the base and organizes a raid at IK-17 Orzenyi to free Yarovoy at the same time as Gentry and the Legion breaking out Zoya and Nadia from IK-2 Yavas, modifying an earlier plan where the Ukrainian Air Force targets radar installations between Ukraine and Voronezh; the Russian special forces teams trained by Hightower will then proceed to IK-17 Orzenyi via V-22 Ospreys to pick up Yarovoy.

Hightower decides to join the raid at IK-17 Orzenyi, where he finds an ailing Yarovoy and extracts him. Meanwhile, Gentry, Maskaev, and Legion operatives storm IK-2 Yavas with Ukrainian air support; at the same time, Zoya breaks herself out of prison and picks up Nadia on the way. She reunites with Gentry as they flee the prison while also capturing Baronov, who had sent FSB Alpha Group soldiers in an unsuccessful attempt to capture them. They link up with Hightower, Yarovoy, and the surviving Russian special forces soldiers and flee Mordovia in a V-22 Osprey.

After the operation, CIA's deputy director of operations Trey Watkins assigns Hanley to a new private firm with Gentry and Hightower as its sole contract employees, while Zoya recovers at a CIA safe house in Charlottesville, Virginia.

== Characters ==
- Courtland "Court" Gentry: aka the Gray Man, aka Violator, aka Sierra Six, aka Chayka; a former CIA paramilitary operations officer; former CIA operations officer, former CIA contract agent
- Zoya Zakharova: aka Anthem, aka 7379; a former SVR (Russian foreign intelligence) officer; former CIA contract agent
- Zack Hightower: aka Romantic; a former DEVGRU (SEAL Team 6) officer; former CIA paramilitary operations officer; former CIA contract agent
- Matthew Hanley: The deputy chief of station, Bogotá, CIA
- Angela Lacy: The senior operations officer, CIA
- William "Trey" Watkins: The deputy director for operations, CIA
- Natan Yarovoy: The Russian politician and dissident, prisoner in Men's Correctional Colony IK-17 Orzenyi
- Nadia Yarovaya: The Russian dissident, prisoner in Women's Correctional Colony IK-2 Yavas
- Vitaly Peskov: The president of the Russian Federation
- Karol Dvorak: The lieutenant colonel of podpolkovnik, Russian military intelligence of GRU
- Eriks Leonidovich Baronov: The major colonel of polkovnik, Russian state security service of FSB
- Mikhail Sorkin: The director of New Russia Council, dissident Russian oligarch
- Denis Maskaev: The cell leader, Freedom of Russia Legion, Russian resistance fighter
- Katarina Orlova: The battalion leader, Freedom of Russia Legion, Russian resistance fighter
- Tatyana Kurilo: The Freedom of Russia Legion, Russian resistance fighter
- Sasha: The Freedom of Russia Legion, Russian resistance fighter
- Dima: The Freedom of Russia Legion, Russian resistance fighter
- Albert Maximov: The warden, Women's Correctional Colony IK-2 Yavas
- Dr. Milda Berzina: A Latvian podcaster
- Arkady Rubenov: The Russian apartment building manager

== Development ==
Midnight Black was inspired by the Russo-Ukrainian war as well as the 1982 film Firefox directed by and starring Clint Eastwood. In an interview with NPR, Greaney added: "This book, for me, is kind of an homage to these Cold War novels that I was reading in the 1980s, Tom Clancy and all those guys, because what's happening over there now, sadly, is very similar, and I wanted to kind of tell that type of a story."

== Release ==
Midnight Black is scheduled to be released and publishing date by Berkley Publishing Group in the United States on February 18, 2025.

== Reception ==
=== Commercial ===
Midnight Black debuted at number two at the Combined Print and E-Book Fiction category of the New York Times bestseller list for the week of March 9, 2025, making it Greaney's ninth top 10 novel in the Gray Man series. It also debuted at number six on the Hardcover Fiction category of the same list.

=== Critical ===
Publishers Weekly hailed the book as "one of Greaney's best yet", adding: "Greaney’s action scenes are as kinetic and chaotic as ever—especially an exhilarating chase through the Moscow subway—but it’s Court’s tender humanity when it comes to protecting his allies that shines brightest." Thriller novel reviewer The Real Book Spy praised the book and its author: "This is the book that Gray Man fans have hoped for, and rest assured, Greaney dials it way up, fully unleashing Court Gentry and holding nothing back to give his readers an unmatched experience that not only resets the bar but will, in all likelihood, ultimately prove to be the measuring stick future thrillers are judged against." In a review for The Cipher Brief, former CIA officers Jay and Anne Gruner points out that the book may be of particular interest to members of the military and those who have served in CIA's paramilitary operations.
