= Relentless (Greaney novel) =

2021 novel by Mark Greaney

- First edition cover
- Author: Mark Greaney
- Audio read by: Jay Snyder
- Language: English
- Series: The Gray Man
- Release number: 10
- Genre: Thriller
- Publisher: Berkley Publishing Group
- Publication date: February 16, 2021
- Publication place: United States
- Media type: Print (hardback & paperback)
- Pages: 528
- ISBN: 978-0-593-09895-0
- Preceded by: One Minute Out
- Followed by: Sierra Six

Relentless is an action thriller novel by Mark Greaney, published on February 16, 2021, by Berkley Books. It is the tenth book in the Gray Man series, featuring assassin and CIA operative Court Gentry. The novel centers on efforts by Gentry to find a missing NSA agent and later to stop a proxy war between Iran and the United States. It debuted at number four on The New York Times Best Seller list.

== Plot ==
While recovering from a freelance operation in Los Angeles, Court Gentry is tasked by his boss Matthew Hanley with apprehending former NSA computer scientist Clark Drummond. Drummond had faked his death and is in hiding in Caracas, Venezuela under the protection of the local intelligence unit (SEBIN). Hanley had previously sent Gentry’s fellow contract agent Zack Hightower to capture Drummond, but was imprisoned by SEBIN operatives.

Gentry tracks down Drummond, who informs him about a database-linked software application named PowerSlave, which provides information on every employee in the U.S. intelligence community with the means to identify them through facial recognition software. He had sent a copy of PowerSlave to a mysterious woman named Miriam, who is actually Annika Dittenhofer, a former German intelligence officer now working for private intelligence unit Shrike International Group, to surveil Iranian nationals in Berlin, Germany. The two are later attacked by a mercenary unit led by former special forces operative Keith Hulett (call sign Hades), who kills Drummond as Gentry barely survives.

Hades is summoned by Sultan al-Habsi, deputy director of United Arab Emirates’s intelligence unit and Shrike Group’s sole client. He tasks him and his team with assassinating Iranian anti-regime operatives in Berlin using intelligence unwittingly provided by Shrike Group, as he plots a proxy war between Iran and the United States in the hopes of succeeding his ailing father, the crown prince of UAE, and to reinstate the European Union's sanctions on Iran.

Meanwhile, CIA contract agent and Gentry’s former lover Zoya Zakharova infiltrates Shrike Group, where she is tasked by her superior Ric Ennis with monitoring Iranian nationals in Berlin. With Ennis aware of her identity as a former Russian foreign intelligence operative on the run, the Kremlin sends a team of her former colleagues employed by the Russian mafia, led by the skilled yet alcoholic assassin Maksim Akulov, to eliminate Zoya.

Gentry finds out about Zoya’s mission and asks Hanley to run counter surveillance in Berlin. He meets with Dr. Azra Kaya, who provides him with medication. Gentry is picked up by security cameras as he leaves Venezuela and enters Berlin; al-Habsi tasks Hades and his team with eliminating Gentry. They encounter each other one night as Gentry surveils Zoya, leading to a gunfight resulting in the loss of one of Hades’s men.

The next day, Akulov and his team attempt to eliminate Zoya in her hotel room, killing Ennis in the process. Gentry enters the room from the windows and rescues her. Akulov survives a fall from the hotel room window and vows to eliminate them both. Zoya later arranges for the release of Hightower from prison in Venezuela using her connections with SEBIN as Gentry tracks down Dittenhofer. Hightower later reunites with Gentry in Berlin.

Al-Habsi provides intel leading to the assassination of Iranian Quds Force commander Vahid Rajavi in a U.S. drone strike. This leads Quds agent Haz Mirza to activate his sleeper cell and stage an attack at the U.S. embassy in Berlin. Al-Habsi reaches out and instead offers him a larger crew to stage an attack on the U.S. ambassador to Germany using autonomous attack drones, leading Mirza to abandon his sleeper cell to be dispatched by embassy security.

Hanley discreetly arrives in Berlin to inform Gentry about al-Habsi and how the CIA had advanced his career in Emirati intelligence, rendering him untouchable. Gentry and Hightower later follow Dittenhofer as she tracks down the location of Mirza’s burner phone to an abandoned factory complex near Lake Mecklenburg, where she runs into Hades and his men. They get into a gunfight with Gentry and Hightower, who both rescue Dittenhofer as Zoya arrives and spirits them out. Having survived the gunfight alone, Hades demands answers from al-Habsi but is killed by Mirza.

Hanley decides to invite himself to an art exhibit at the ambassador’s residence despite the latter’s objections, with Gentry, Hightower and Zoya posing as bodyguards. Later that night, Mirza launches a drone attack outside the residence and detonates a semi-trailer at the front gates, killing security personnel. He and his men storm the residence in search of the ambassador, taking hostages including Hanley. Hightower shoots the drones as Gentry and Zoya dispatch Mirza’s men. With help from DSS personnel, they kill Mirza.

Gentry returns to Dr. Kaya’s apartment with Zoya and Hightower to find out that Akulov had survived and had taken the doctor hostage. They have a tense standoff before Zoya intervenes and Gentry shoots Akulov dead. The next day, Hanley discreetly orders Gentry to assassinate al-Habsi, who had become prince of Dubai after his father's death, at the Palm Islands. Hanley is later reassigned to Papua New Guinea for insubordination and warns Gentry that he is effectively disavowed by the CIA.

== Characters ==
- Courtland Gentry: Code name Violator, former CIA paramilitary operations officer; CIA contractor, Poison Apple program
- Matthew Hanley: Deputy director for operations, CIA
- Zack Hightower: Code name Romantic; former CIA paramilitary operations officer; CIA contractor, Poison Apple program
- Zoya Zakharova: Code name Anthem; former SVR (Russian Foreign Intelligence Service) officer; CIA contractor, Poison Apple program
- Suzanne Brewer: Operations officer, Programs and Plans, CIA
- Clark Drummond: Former NSA computer scientist
- Ric Ennis: Former CIA operations officer; intelligence officer for Shrike International Group
- Sultan al-Habsi: Code name Tarik; deputy director of the Signals Intelligence Agency, United Arab Emirates; son of the crown prince of the UAE and the ruler of Dubai
- Sheikh Rashid al-Habsi: Father of Sultan; prime minister of the United Arab Emirates; crown prince of the UAE and ruler of Dubai
- Rudolf Spangler: Owner of Shrike International Group; former executive, East German Ministry of State Security
- Annika Dittenhofer (Miriam): Shrike International Group employee; former German military intelligence officer
- Dr. Azra Kaya: Turkish/German doctor of internal medicine
- Chris Travers: CIA Special Activities Division (Ground Branch) paramilitary operations officer
- Keith Hulett: Code name Hades; mercenary; former U.S. Army Special Forces
- Haz Mirza: Former Iranian Quds Force commander; Iranian Quds sleeper agent
- Kamran Iravani: Member of MeK (People's Mojahedin Organization of Iran); anti-regime operative
- Maksim Akulov: Russian mafia assassin; former soldier, Spetsnaz, Vega Group; Federal Security Service of the Russian Federation
- Semyon Pervak: Russian mafia assassin
- Inna Sorokina: Russian intelligence asset for Solntsevskaya Bratva; former officer, Foreign Intelligence Service of the Russian Federation
- Anya Bolichova: Russian intelligence asset for Solntsevskaya Bratva
- Ryan Sedgwick: U.S. ambassador to Germany

== Reception ==
=== Commercial ===
Relentless debuted at number four at the Combined Print and E-Book Fiction category of The New York Times Best Seller list for the week of March 7, 2021, making it Greaney's fifth top 10 novel in the Gray Man series. It also debuted at number eleven on the Hardcover Fiction category of the same list.

=== Critical ===
Kirkus Reviews regarded the book as "not for the squeamish but a jolt for thriller junkies". Thriller novel reviewer The Real Book Spy praised it as Greaney's "most thrilling novel to date, and some of the best plotting we’ve seen from him yet".
