= Sierra Six =

2022 novel by Mark Greaney

- First edition cover
- Author: Mark Greaney
- Audio read by: Jay Snyder
- Language: English
- Series: The Gray Man
- Release number: 11
- Genre: Thriller
- Publisher: Berkley Publishing Group
- Publication date: February 15, 2022
- Publication place: United States
- Media type: Print (hardback & paperback)
- Pages: 528
- ISBN: 978-0-593-09899-8
- Preceded by: Relentless
- Followed by: Burner

Sierra Six is an action thriller novel by Mark Greaney, published on February 15, 2022, by Berkley Books. It is the eleventh book in the Gray Man series, featuring assassin and former CIA operative Court Gentry. The novel features two storylines, in which Gentry tracks down a Pakistani terrorist he had crossed paths with twelve years ago as a member of a CIA paramilitary operations unit. It debuted at number four on the New York Times bestseller list.

== Plot ==
=== Twelve years ago ===
A CIA paramilitary operations unit named Golf Sierra is tasked with capturing Omar Mufti, deputy commander of Pakistani terrorist group Kashmiri Resistance Front (KRF), at an abandoned UAV base near the Khyber Pass. The six-man team led by Zack Hightower runs into an ambush that claims the life of their sixth member, codenamed Sierra Six.

Seeking a replacement to continue the hunt for Mufti and his superior Pasha the Kashmiri, CIA Special Activities Division head Denny Carmichael brings in 25-year-old Court Gentry, a non-official cover operative codenamed Violator, as the new Sierra Six. Golf Sierra's group chief Matthew Hanley introduces Gentry to the team, who take issue with his age, lack of military experience, and reputation as a lone wolf.

Hightower trains Gentry for two weeks, after which Golf Sierra is deployed to Lahore, Pakistan to monitor a chemical plant that the KRF had staked out for its ammonium nitrate (AN) material to create car bombs. Led by Mufti, the terrorists raid the factory, steal its AN supply, and kill its workers. Golf Sierra follows them to a deserted hotel, where Gentry takes pictures of Mufti and two of his companions; one of them is Pakistani intelligence (ISI) officer Murad Khan, revealed to be Pasha the Kashmiri. Hanley sends the images to Pakistan's CIA station chief Ted Appleton, who informs his ISI asset and lover Aimal Viziri, tipping off Khan.

Hanley orders Golf Sierra to raid the hotel. Hightower orders Gentry to follow a minibus carrying half of the ammonium nitrate as it leaves the hotel for a shopping center, where KRF fighters stage a terrorist attack. Hightower and the rest of his team attempt to raid the hotel but are arrested by Pakistani police. Having been alerted to the shopping mall attack, they drive there just as the minibus is detonated. Hightower and his team break free and rescue Gentry, who accidentally shoots one of his teammates. Hanley and Hightower order Gentry dismissed from Golf Sierra, but persuade him to stay in Pakistan for the remainder of the operation.

CIA junior analyst Julie Marquez deduces that Khan had stolen nuclear waste from a disposal facility in Punjab and plans to mix it with the rest of the ammonium nitrate to create dirty bombs, and that the abandoned UAV base that Golf Sierra had previously raided is being used as a staging ground for the KRF. This leads to a joint operation with fellow paramilitary ops team Lima Foxtrot, SEAL Team Ten, and U.S. Army Rangers to raid the base. Meanwhile, Khan plans to drop the dirty bombs at U.S. military bases in Pakistan and Afghanistan through four repainted American transport helicopters, with the fourth one equipped with an improvised explosive device.

As the American troops stage a raid at the UAV base, Mufti flies Khan out in the fourth helicopter as the three helicopters leave for their targets. He drops Khan off at an undisclosed location and proceeds for the Afghan border, as Golf Sierra pursues the other helicopters with Gentry as the pilot. They manage to shoot them down but are unable to stop Mufti from flying to the military base in Khost. Marquez shoots at the helicopter as it detonates, killing her and some of the base personnel.

Having become close to Marquez, Gentry is distraught as he finds out about her death. Hightower decides to let him stay in Golf Sierra.

=== Present day ===
On the run from the CIA after the events of Relentless, Gentry takes on freelance work through Indian private broker Arjun Bandari, where he is tasked with monitoring the visit of an ISI official to the Turkish embassy in Algiers, Algeria, who turns out to be Khan. Gentry unsuccessfully tries to kill him, which leads to his colleague and Arjun's niece Priya being kidnapped by Khan's men and taken to Mumbai, India.

Khan interrogates Priya about Gentry's identity and her uncle, who then gives up Court's location. Meanwhile, Gentry tracks down Priya's location to an apartment building heavily guarded by henchmen from the Indian crime organization B-Company under orders from Khan. After finding out that Arjun had set him up, he proceeds to rescue his niece. They later go to Arjun's residence, only to find him dead after being tortured by Khan.

Gentry informs his former boss Hanley, now CIA station chief in Papua New Guinea, about Khan. The latter tells him to reach out to Appleton, now retired from the CIA and living as a schoolteacher in Mumbai. Meanwhile, Priya goes back to her uncle's house to retrieve a flash drive with a record of Arjun's contracts as a broker, where she learns that Appleton had ordered the Algiers operation and specifically requested Gentry. At the same time, Gentry rescues Appleton from being kidnapped by Khan's henchmen.

Meeting with Priya at their safehouse, Appleton explains that he chose Gentry to hunt down Khan as revenge for what happened twelve years ago; the Pakistani had had his lover Viziri killed after finding out she was a double agent. They later pinpoint Khan's location to a skyscraper at Nariman Point at the southern tip of Mumbai, where Khan plans to detonate a radioactive bomb in the middle of an approaching monsoon. He later captures Priya and Appleton as Gentry closes in on them, battling B-Company gangsters and Khan's Pakistani henchmen. He kills Khan, but not before the latter starts the countdown. Gentry reluctantly contacts CIA assistant to the deputy director of operations Suzanne Brewer to help the Indian SWAT team disarm the bomb as he escapes.

== Characters ==
- Courtland “Court” Gentry: aka Golf Sierra Six, aka Violator, aka the Gray Man; former CIA Special Activities Division (Ground Branch) paramilitary operations officer; freelance intelligence operative
- Zack Hightower: aka Golf Sierra One; CIA Special Activities Division (Ground Branch) paramilitary operations officer
- Kendrick Lennox: aka Golf Sierra Two; CIA Special Activities Division (Ground Branch) paramilitary operations officer
- Keith Morgan: aka Golf Sierra Three; CIA Special Activities Division (Ground Branch) paramilitary operations officer
- Jim Pace: aka Golf Sierra Four; CIA Special Activities Division (Ground Branch) paramilitary operations officer
- Bernardino “Dino” Redus: aka Golf Sierra Five; CIA Special Activities Division (Ground Branch) paramilitary operations officer
- Murad Khan: Operations officer, Foreign Coordination Unit, Inter-Services Intelligence Agency (Pakistan)
- Omar Mufti: Major, Pakistan Army Aviation Corps
- Terry Vance: Director of analysis, CIA Special Activities Division (Ground Branch), Task Force Golf Sierra
- Julie Marquez: Junior tactical analyst, CIA Special Activities Division
- Priyanka Bandari: Freelance intelligence, surveillance and reconnaissance specialist
- Arjun Bandari: Freelance intelligence broker
- Ted Appleton: Former CIA operations officer, former CIA chief of station, Islamabad, Pakistan
- Matthew Hanley: CIA chief of station, Port Moresby, Papua New Guinea; former deputy director of operations, CIA; former group chief, CIA Special Activities Division (Ground Branch), Task Force Golf Sierra
- Suzanne Brewer: Assistant deputy director of operations, CIA
- Aimal Viziri: Code name Leopard; Inter-Services Intelligence Agency (Pakistan) operative; Foreign Coordination Unit
- Nassir Rasool: Pakistani counterintelligence technical specialist

== Development ==
While Greaney usually travels to foreign countries for research on his novels, the COVID-19 pandemic meant he had to rely on an author living in India for writing the scenes set in Mumbai. He "scouted locations for me, sent pictures and other tips about the area, and read an early draft to make sure I depicted the essence of the city correctly," Greaney added.

== Reception ==
=== Commercial ===
Sierra Six debuted at number four at the Combined Print and E-Book Fiction category of The New York Times Best Seller list for the week of March 6, 2022, making it Greaney's sixth top 10 novel in the Gray Man series. It also debuted at number six on the Hardcover Fiction category of the same list.

=== Critical ===
Publishers Weekly praised Greaney for "seamlessly adjust[ing] focus between the timelines, jumping from one exhilarating roller-coaster ride to the other". Kirkus Reviews hailed the book's "over-the-top thrills" and pointed out the two storylines's "strong, brave, and appealing women".
