= Red Metal =

2019 military thriller novel

- First edition
- Author: Mark Greaney; H. Ripley Rawlings IV
- Audio read by: Marc Vietor
- Language: English
- Genre: War novel; Techno-thriller; Military fiction
- Publisher: Berkley Publishing Group
- Publication date: July 16, 2019
- Publication place: United States
- Media type: Print (Hardcover), Audio, eBook
- Pages: 638
- ISBN: 9780451490414

Red Metal is a war novel, written by Mark Greaney and Rip Rawlings and released on July 16, 2019. Set in late December 2020, it features a military conflict between NATO and Russian military forces across two continents, as the latter plots to retake a rare-earth metal mine in East Africa. Red Metal is Greaney's first stand-alone novel and is Rawlings' debut novel. The book debuted on The New York Times, USA Today and Amazon bestseller's lists.

== Plot summary ==
Three years ago, the Russian Ground Forces are forced to relinquish control of a rare-earth mine in Mrima Hill near Mombasa, Kenya. Bitter about the retreat, Spetsnaz officer Yuri Borbikov formulates Operation Red Metal, an extensive military strike across Europe as a large diversion to retake the mine.

In the present day, Chinese Sea Dragon naval commandos infiltrate Taiwan and assassinate the presidential candidate of the pro-Beijing Taiwan Democratic Communist Party. The Chinese Communist Party publicly frames the ruling Kuomintang party for the assassination and threatens military intervention over the elections. In Arlington, Virginia, Marine Lieutenant Colonel Daniel Connolly, an Afghanistan infantry veteran, works in the Joint Staff office of the Pentagon with Army Major Bob Griggs. The two are tasked to investigate an intelligence leak of an extra-marital affair between two high-ranking officers of the Indo-Pacific Command that causes both of them to be relieved and disrupts the chain of command. Connolly and Griggs consult NSA analyst Nik Melanopolis who deduces that the leak was engineered by Russian GRU hackers. The Joint Chiefs, however, are predisposed to a war in the Pacific and deploy Carrier Strike Group 5 to Taiwan.

In Moscow, Russia, President Anatoly Rivkin authorizes Operation Red Metal without the approval of the Ministry of Defence in response to crippling economic sanctions. He assigns Colonel General Eduard Sabaneyev to lead a lightning raid via militarized trains into Europe to destroy the US African and European Commands in Stuttgart, Germany, under the guise of military exercises with Belarus. Meanwhile, Colonel General Boris Lazar is tasked to lead an invasion force to seize Mrima Hill by travelling overland through Iran, also under the guise of military exercise, and covertly sail to Djibouti where they will be free to advance into Kenya before the US can mount a response. General Sabaneyev and Colonel Borbikov are confident that the operation will succeed, but General Lazar is disturbed by Borbikov's contingency plan to destroy the rare-earth mine with nuclear-tipped artillery shells if they fail to capture it.

Tensions spike in the Pacific when the destroyer USS Stethem sinks an attacking Chinese submarine in the international waters near Taiwan. The United States National Security Council consequently decides to fully commit to deterrence against China and deploy the Global Response Force to US Pacific bases, effectively isolating NATO forces in Europe. Colonel Connolly and Major Griggs attempt to advise the Joint Chiefs on the Russian machinations but are ignored and rebuffed. Poland, however, is disturbed by the Russian military buildup and begins activating the civilian Territorial Defence Force to prepare for a possible invasion.

In Djibouti City, French DGSE intelligence officer Pascal Arch-Blanchette notices Russian Spetsnaz activity in the country. His investigation is ignored by the French government, but he tips off his son, Captain Apollo Arch-Blanchette of the 13th Parachute Dragoon special reconnaissance regiment, who discovers Russian satellite phone signals at mountain peaks in Germany, Austria, and the Czech Republic. Apollo's platoon recons the sights and repels Spetsnaz teams under Colonel Borbikov, but do not realize that Borbikov's men are broadcasting false all-clear radar signals to NATO's airborne early warning and control stations.

Operation Red Metal officially begins on Christmas Eve when a Russian Air Force Su-57 stealth fighter squadron simultaneously shuts down communications across Europe by launching anti-satellite missiles, as GRU "Fancy Bear" hackers penetrate NATO's communications relays, causing an internet and cellular blackout across Europe. General Sabaneyev then launches the raiding force from Belarus through Poland and into Germany, using the covert assault train Red Blizzard 1 as his mobile headquarters. The Polish Land Forces and Territorial Defence Force (TDF) are quickly overrun. A young TDF volunteer named Paulina Tobiasz becomes a local hero and is promoted to sergeant after her entire company is wiped out by a Russian armoured column. Maintenance detachments of the US 37th Armor Regiment in Grafenwöhr are also alerted to the invasion, having been sent ahead of their combat counterparts to prepare for training exercises. Despite being primarily composed of maintenance units, Lieutenant Colonel Tom Grant scrapes together a composite M1A2 Abrams tank regiment supported by a German Army Leopard 2 tank battalion, Apache sections from the 3rd Aviation Regiment, and US Air Force A-10 Warthogs from the US Air Force 57th Wing. Despite their attempted defense, the US-German forces take heavy casualties as the Russian armour units lay waste to AFRICOM, EUCOM, Katterbach Kaserne, and Ramstein Air Base, severely crippling NATO's military and logistical strength. Having completed their objectives in Europe, the Kremlin contacts the White House and demands a ceasefire and safe return of all Russian forces through Germany and Poland into neutral Belarus, which the US and NATO accept. Colonel Grant wants to commit the 37th Armor to a full counterattack, but US forces in Europe are ordered to escort the Russians back to Belarus.

Meanwhile, General Lazar marches his forces southeast through Iran for Oman, where they embark on a heavily guarded flotilla escorted by Iranian container ships west for Djibouti City. Back in the Pentagon, Colonel Connelly is finally able to convince the Joint Chiefs of Russia's true objective. The Pentagon then deploys the Marine Regimental Combat Team 5 under the command of Colonel Ken Caster to sail to East Africa aboard the USS Boxer (LHD-4) and prevent the Russians from taking Mrima Hill. Connolly is assigned to RCT-5 as a Pentagon liaison and acts as an assistant operations officer thanks to his friendship with Caster and his subordinates. A flight of USAF B-1 Lancer bombers attempt to intercept the Russian-Iranian flotilla over the Gulf of Aden but are shot down by anti-air missiles.

In Europe, the Polish government plans to violate the ceasefire by funneling the withdrawing Russians through Wrocław to be ambushed by the TDF and GROM special forces. Polish Air Force fighter-attack aircraft destroy several bridges along the Oder River, forcing the Russians into a pitched battle with the TDF militia in the streets of Wrocław where they suffer heavy casualties as they push through the city and across the Oder. Mistaking them as being allied with the Poles, Russian BTR-80s fire on the US 37th Armor units escorting them. President Henry then authorizes lethal action against the Russians in Europe and the US-German forces in Poland begin attacking Sabaneyev's force with combined land and air assets as they retreat through Wrocław. NATO forces continuously pursue the Russians through south-central Poland while TDF pockets carry them through the countryside. President Henry later convinces the president of Taiwan to postpone the country's upcoming elections in order to forestall an imminent Chinese invasion and therefore provide more reinforcements to Africa.

Upon arriving at the port of Djibouti City, Lazar's flotilla is attacked by the submarine USS John Warner, destroying oil tankers and rendering his T-90 battle tanks useless. Nevertheless, Lazar, accompanied by Borbikov, presses on and marches his forces south for the mine. Pascal manages to transmit intelligence of the Russian forces to the DGSE but is captured and executed by Borbikov's Spetsnaz. Apollo's Dragoon platoon also arrives in Djibouti and harasses the Russian columns as they march through Ethiopia. Meanwhile, the USS Boxer lands RCT-5 in Dar es Salaam, Tanzania. Upon receiving intelligence from Apollo's Dragoons, the 1st Light Armored Reconnaissance Battalion conducts delaying ambushes against the Russians at Moyale, Ethiopia, and Mount Kenya. RCT-5 is then able to establish a hasty defense base at Mrima Hill with support from a French Foreign Legion battalion.

Back in Europe, USAF Warthog pilot Major Ray "Shank" Vance destroys the Russian attack train in Poland and Sabaneyev is forced to move out the rest of his forces overland. A Russian supply train is sent from Belarus to reinforce Sabaneyev but TDF militia led by Sergeant Tobiasz switch the tracks to divert the train's course, causing it to be ambushed and destroyed by PLF PT-91 Twardy tanks. After being shot down by an Su-57, Shank joins Tobiasz's militiamen and assists them in destroying a Russian armor column by coordinating airstrikes from other Warthogs of his squadron. He and Tobiasz develop romantic feelings for each other afterwards. Shank even has a promissory ring forged for her, but he is killed as a PLF platoon attempts to return him to US forces. The Russians eventually reach Belarus and cross the Bug River, where General Sabaneyev leaves a T-14 Armata platoon as a rearguard to fire on the pursuing NATO forces, confident that they will not retaliate. Colonel Grant, however, is enraged after receiving fire from the T-14s and orders the 37th Armor to press the attack into Belarus, violating their neutrality and shocking Sabaneyev. Running desperately low on fuel, Sabaneyev attempts to coerce a supply base in Slonim to surrender their reserves but the Belarusians refuse to comply. The 37th Armor then attacks the base, destroys the remaining Russian armor, and captures Sabaneyev, defeating Operation Red Metal in Europe.

In Kenya, General Lazar's force attacks Mrima Hill and start gradually obliterating the Marine defenses using accurate artillery strikes and frontal assaults with their BTRs while ZSU-23-4 Shilka tanks defend against Marine airstrikes. As the Marines are pressed to their breaking point, however, the USS John Warner slips through a Russian-Iranian blockade off the Kenyan coast and fires Tomahawk cruise missiles that destroy most of the Russian artillery batteries. Lazar goes missing in action as his BTR is destroyed and is presumed dead by Colonel Borbikov, who assumes command and orders a VDV regiment of the 76th Guards Air Assault Division to launch a final attack. Sensing the dire situation, Apollo leads his Dragoon platoon and a Marine squad on a recon sortie to mark the Russian paratrooper's staging areas for artillery strikes. They then stage a diversionary ambush against a VDV convoy at a large stating area. With the staging areas marked, Connolly gives the Marine artillery batteries Pentagon authorization for a massive "Shake 'n Bake" fire mission that decimates the VDV regiment and destroys many BTRs. With his final attack thwarted, Borbikov orders a reserve Russian artillery battery to shell the mine with the nuclear-tipped artillery shells as a last resort. A wounded Lazar storms in and has Borbikov arrested, who then tries to kill Lazar but is gunned down himself. Lazar negotiates a ceasefire with RCT-5 the next day. The remnant of his force retreats back to Djibouti with orders from Moscow and Operation Red Metal is decisively defeated.

The political fallout causes Rivkin to be ousted from office by the Duma, as Sabaneyev is tried for war crimes by the International Criminal Court. In Warsaw, Poland, Tobiasz is commissioned as a PLF officer and receives the Virtuti Militari medal but is heartbroken by Shank's death. Colonel Grant returns to Germany expecting a court-martial for violating Belarusian neutrality but is instead reassigned to Fort Bliss, he and his subordinates share a celebratory round of beer with their German counterparts. Apollo receives the Legion of Merit and buries Pascal's body in the Saint-Vincent Cemetery in Paris. He and his platoon sergeant then sets about the difficult task of apologizing to the families of their dead Dragoons. In Arlington, Connolly and Griggs are promoted and the former receives the Navy Cross.

Taiwan resumes their presidential election and the Kuomintang win again despite the objections of the Chinese government. The People's Liberation Army then muster for naval invasion of Taiwan. The novel ends as Sea Dragons prepare to infiltrate the country once again.

== Characters ==
=== United States military ===
- Colonel Ken Caster (USMC): Commander, Regimental Combat Team 5
- Lieutenant Darnell Chandler (U.S. Army): Assistant maintenance officer, 37th Armor Regiment
- Lieutenant Colonel Dan Connolly (USMC): infantry officer, assigned to the Pentagon. Former commander of 3rd Battalion, 2nd Marines; former platoon commander with 3/5
- Commander Diana DelVecchio (U.S. Navy): Captain, USS John Warner
- Lieutenant Sandra “Glitter” Glisson (U.S. Army): Apache pilot
- Lieutenant Colonel Tom Grant (U.S. Army): tank logistics and maintenance officer; interim commander, 37th Armor Regiment, deployed to Grafenwöhr, Germany
- Major Bob Griggs (U.S. Army): Infantry and Ranger officer; Army infantryman, Ranger tab; on assignment to the Joint Staff Office for Strategy, Plans & Policy (J5).
- Lieutenant Colonel Eric McHale (USMC): Operations officer, RCT-5
- Captain Brad Spillane (U.S. Army): Interim operations officer, 37th Armor Regiment
- Captain Raymond “Shank” Vance (USAF): A-10 pilot

=== The Russians ===
- Colonel Yuri Vladimirovich Borbikov: Russian Federation special forces commander
- Colonel Danilo Dryagin: Russian Federation infantry commander
- Captain Georg Etush: Submarine commander, Kazan (K-561)
- Colonel Dmitry Kir: Chief of staff and de facto chief of operations for Colonel General Boris Lazar
- Colonel General Boris Lazar: Russian Federation colonel general
- President Anatoly Rivkin: President of the Russian Federation
- Colonel General Eduard Sabaneyev: Russian Federation colonel general
- Colonel Feliks Smirnov: Deputy commanding officer to Colonel General Sabaneyev
- Colonel Ivan Zolotov: Russian Air Force Su-57 pilot, Red Talon Squadron

=== Other characters ===
- Captain Apollo Arc-Blanchette: French special forces officer, 13th Parachute Dragoon Regiment
- Pascal Arc-Blanchette: Officer in Direction Générale de la Sécurité Extérieure (DGSE), the French foreign intelligence agency; Captain Apollo Arc-Blanchette's father
- Captain Chen Min Jun: Chinese special forces officer
- Dr. Nik Melanopolis: Analyst, National Security Agency
- Major Blaz Ott: German Bundeswehr armor maintenance officer
- Paulina Tobiasz: Polish Civilian Militia member

== Development ==
In researching for the novel, Greaney and Rawlings flew to Poland, Germany and France. They met up with Brigadier General Klaus Feldmann, the last German armored brigade commander before reforms reduced the size of the German tank corps. They met with a French special forces commander in Paris from the 13th Parachute Dragoon Regiment, and spent a day aboard the USS John Warner (SSN-785), a nuclear powered Virginia-class attack submarine of the United States Navy. Both flew to Nellis Air Force Base where they spent two days at the USAF tactical fighter center for the US A-10 Thunderbolt II learning flight tactics, each night meeting the officers off duty in the "Hog-Trough", the squadron's famed bar. In addition, Greaney and Rawlings acknowledge over a dozen other personal, military service-members they contacted to gain information to write the novel.

== Reception ==
=== Commercial ===
The novel debuted at number fifteen and Hardcover Fiction categories of the New York Times bestseller list for the week of August 4, 2019, making it Greaney's second NYT bestseller for the year of 2019. In addition, it debuted on the USA Today Best Selling Books list for the week of 4 August 2019. Red Metal achieved the Amazon Chart rating for the week of 21 July 2019. Apple Books listed Red Metal in sixth place for Mysteries & Thriller Bestsellers on July 21, 2019.

=== Critical ===
Publishers Weekly gave the book a Starred Review, praising the book as "The various battles—fought on land, sea, and in the air—are exciting, realistic, and technically detailed, complete with the high emotions experienced by the combatants. As in the best of this genre, there are no cartoon villains, just dedicated warriors who are given a mission and are determined to carry it out. This is powerful material, required reading for anyone interested in modern warfare." In November 2019, they selected Red Metal as one of the "Best Books of 2019" in the Thriller/Mystery category.

Kirkus Reviews wrote, "Readers will be humming "The Marines’ Hymn” after finishing this paean to the U.S. Marines. Hoorah! As with all of Greaney's work, this is a fun read. If only all our wars were fiction."

Thriller novel reviewer The Real Book Spy stated that "While it’s already drawn comparisons to Tom Clancy’s Red Storm Rising, Red Metal boasts even more action and tension, reading like a modern-day Game of Thrones (without the dragons and White Walkers), as individuals go all-in fighting for their cause—often with little regard for the rest of the world. Much like George R.R. Martin’s epic fantasy saga, Greaney and Rawlings rely more on their characters to drive the story than the explosions, gunfights, and eye-candy, of which there is still plenty. The wargaming is impressive to be sure, but it all works as well as it does because the characters are so well fleshed out, and the conflict so perfectly captured."
