= One Minute Out =

2020 novel by Mark Greaney

- First edition cover
- Author: Mark Greaney
- Audio read by: Jay Snyder
- Language: English
- Series: The Gray Man
- Release number: 9
- Genre: Thriller
- Publisher: Berkley Publishing Group
- Publication date: February 18, 2020
- Publication place: United States
- Media type: Print (hardback & paperback)
- Pages: 493
- ISBN: 978-0-593-09891-2
- Preceded by: Mission Critical
- Followed by: Relentless

One Minute Out is an action thriller novel by Mark Greaney, published on February 18, 2020 by Berkley Books. It is the ninth book in the Gray Man series, featuring assassin and CIA operative Court Gentry. The novel follows Gentry as he tracks down a global sex trafficking organization across eastern Europe. To date, One Minute Out is the only Gray Man novel to be written in the first person.

One Minute Out debuted at number one on the New York Times bestseller list, making it Greaney's first number one solo entry.

== Plot ==
Court Gentry is tasked with assassinating former Serbian general Ratko Babic at his compound in Bosnia and Herzegovina. While infiltrating his house, Gentry discovers that it is also a way station for young girls waiting to be transported east and sold into sex slavery. After killing Babic, Gentry manages to escape with one of the girls named Liliana while taking heavy fire from the general's men, leaving the other girls behind.

Liliana informs Gentry about Captain Niko Vukovic, a police chief stationed in the nearby city of Mostar who is Babic's associate. After sending the girl home safely, Gentry goes to Mostar and surveils the police officer, later apprehending Hungarian mobsters sent to kill him. While there, he encounters Talyssa Corbu, a Romanian financial analyst working for Europol. She had embarked on a personal mission to find her sister Roxana, who is missing and presumed dead or sold into sex slavery. They agree to work together to save the trafficked girls as well as Roxana.

Gentry snatches Vukovic and tortures him for information. The police officer reveals that the next way station or "pipeline" for the trafficked girls is in Dubrovnik, Croatia, and that he works for a global enterprise called the Consortium, which deals in money laundering and sex trafficking. Gentry and Corbu then proceed to Croatia, where he uses her as bait to attract Consortium men by asking around about the organization. Eventually, Albanian mobsters working for the Consortium kidnap Corbu. Gentry then chases them through the streets of Dubrovnik, eventually saving the analyst and killing her captors. While captive, Corbu overhears of a Consortium hideout near the Croatian coast. They venture there, where Gentry finds a yacht where the young girls are being transported and decides to follow it.

The Director of the Consortium, Hollywood-based businessman Kenneth Cage, sends security contractor Jaco Verdoorn and his men to Croatia in an effort to dispatch Gentry and Corbu. The former South African special forces member is also tasked with shepherding the yacht full of trafficked young girls to an auction in Venice, Italy. Meanwhile, Gentry infiltrates the yacht and finds Roxana, who now goes by the name of Maja and is selected as one of the VIPs to be personally delivered to Cage. However, she refuses to be rescued, vowing to help her sister identify the Consortium's top players. Gentry reluctantly leaves her, narrowly escaping the yacht while under pursuit from Verdoorn and his men.

Court then tries to enlist the CIA's help for resources. However, his boss Matthew Hanley declines, claiming to have no knowledge about the Consortium and sternly telling him that he is needed stateside. Gentry then asks for help from an Italian crime family he had previously worked with in infiltrating the Venice auction, while he instructs Corbu to travel to the Netherlands and coerce a blackhat hacker into accessing the Consortium's financial records.

Unknown to Gentry, Hanley sends a Ground Branch paramilitary team led by his former black ops team leader Zack Hightower into Venice to apprehend the mercenary. They soon get into a gunfight with Verdoorn and his men and are forced to move out. Gentry witnesses this and demands to know how Hanley knew his whereabouts. His boss replies that Cage is an important Agency asset and must not be harmed, but reluctantly allows Court to rescue Roxana and the girls as long as he does not kill the Consortium head. Gentry then joins Hightower and the Ground Branch team as they return to the United States.

Corbu travels to the United States as well, where she tracks down a ranch outside Los Angeles where Roxana and the girls are being kept. At Hightower's recommendation, Gentry enlists the services of a group of veterans led by former Delta Force officer Shep Duvall, who used to raid brothels and rescue trafficked girls in the Philippines until they got caught, imprisoned, and later extradited to the United States. Together they storm the ranch, dispatching most of the security and rescuing the girls. However, Duvall is killed in the firefight, and Verdoorn manages to escape with Cage and Roxana. They later regroup to the Consortium head's mansion in the city.

The next day, Roxana manages to inform her sister about her whereabouts. Court and Duvall's surviving teammates then stage an assault on the mansion. Gentry eventually kills Verdoorn after a brutal fight and catches up to Cage, who lets Roxana go. Court decides not to kill him and castrates him instead. Roxana and Corbu then reunite, as Gentry is picked up by Hightower and summoned for a new mission.

== Development ==
In researching for One Minute Out, Greaney went to Bosnia and Herzegovina, Croatia, Italy, and Los Angeles, locations that would later be featured in the novel. On how he came up with the plot, the author said: "The initial idea for this one began with me picturing the Gray Man on a vengeance mission for something far in the past, but in the process of discovering something unrelated, that’s bigger and more deadly. I soon decided on focusing on human trafficking after doing some research on the subject."

== Reception ==
=== Commercial ===
One Minute Out debuted at number one in the Combined Print and E-Book Fiction category of the New York Times bestseller list for the week of March 8, 2020, making it Greaney's first number one solo entry. His last number one was with co-author Tom Clancy in his final novel Command Authority (2013). In addition, the book charted at number four in the Hardcover Fiction category of the same list.

=== Critical ===
The book received positive reviews. Publishers Weekly called it "memorable" and continued: "Gentry is up to the task. Spy thriller fans will be enthralled." Kirkus Reviews hailed it, stating: "Great storytelling about the pursuit of extrajudicial justice." Thriller novel reviewer The Real Book Spy praised the book's first person point of view: "Greaney’s style is unique, and allowing Gentry to speak directly to readers creates a powerful dynamic as fans will love hearing from the super-assassin and seeing the plot through his eyes. It all works incredibly well and is paired perfectly with the dark subject matter at hand."
