= Armored (novel) =

2022 thriller novel by Mark Greaney

- First edition cover
- Author: Mark Greaney
- Audio read by: Adam Gold
- Language: English
- Series: Armored
- Release number: 1
- Genre: Thriller
- Publisher: Berkley Publishing Group
- Publication date: July 5, 2022
- Publication place: United States
- Media type: Print (Hardcover), Audio, eBook
- Pages: 512
- ISBN: 9780593436875
- Followed by: Sentinel

Armored is an action thriller novel by Mark Greaney, originally released as an audio drama through Audible on December 9, 2021 and in book form on July 5, 2022. It is the first book in a new original series featuring main character Joshua Duffy, a high-risk security contractor. It was followed by a sequel, Sentinel, released in 2024.

== Plot summary ==
Former U.S. Army infantryman Joshua "Josh" Duffy works as a bodyguard for a presidential candidate in Beirut, Lebanon. They run into an ambush after a campaign stop, killing the candidate. Duffy manages to rescue the candidate's wife from their attackers but loses his lower left leg.

Three years later, Duffy barely supports his wife Nichole (a former Army officer and helicopter pilot) and two children as a mall security guard. He runs into his former colleague Mike Gordon, who tells him of a job opportunity with the private military company Armored Saint in Mexico. Desperate to earn money, Duffy meets the agent-in-charge Shane Remmick, who hires him as team leader for the Charlie team providing counterassault. They are assigned with escorting the Mexican Deputy Minister of Interior, his assistant, and two United Nations officials on a peacekeeping mission with Rafael "Rafa" Archuleta, leader of the Los Caballeros Negros (Black Knights) drug cartel, at the Devil's Spine in the Sierra Madre mountains.

El Patron, head of the Guadalajara Cartel and Archuleta's rival, plots to disrupt the peacekeeping mission, which would cause the Mexican army to invade the mountains. He enlists consultant Oscar Cardoza with reaching out to other cartels such as Los Zetas and the Sinaloa Cartel with providing sicarios to attack the UN delegation. At the same time, Cardoza meets with Archuleta and offers to sell surface-to-air missiles that the Black Knights had stolen from the Venezuelan army.

The UN delegation proceeds to Mexico. They are accompanied by cultural liaison Dr. Gabriella Flores, whose warnings about the mission are often ignored by the diplomats and Remmick, who later assigns Duffy to protect her. They are ambushed on their way to the mountains by Los Zetas sicarios, killing most of Gordon's Bravo team. Gordon identifies the Deputy Interior Minister's assistant as a mole working for the Sinaloa Cartel and incapacitates him.

The delegation arrives at the Devil's Spine to meet with Archuleta, where they agree to send a peacekeeping team to the area and allow him to continue his drug empire in exchange for surrendering the missiles. Remmick is revealed to be working with Cardoza, having framed the Deputy Interior Minister's assistant. He detonates a car bomb with the assistant inside into the municipal hall where the diplomats and Archuleta are meeting, killing them all.

Realizing that Remmick had set them up, Duffy and his team as well as Gordon and Dr. Flores get into a gunfight with Black Knights sicarios as they flee the scene. They catch up to Remmick and his Alpha team at an airstrip where they had helped Cardoza load the missiles into a C-130 cargo plane. Remmick shoots Gordon dead as one of Duffy's men wounds him; he then escapes with the C-130 just as Duffy and his team find a smaller cargo plane and pursue them. They launch a missile into the C-130, killing Remmick and his team and destroying the rest of the missiles. Cardoza narrowly escapes the crash and tasks the Los Zetas sicarios, led by the lieutenant Lobo, with hunting down Duffy and his team.

After safely crashing into a nearby canyon, Duffy, his team, and Dr. Flores continue to evade Black Knights and Los Zetas sicarios, stopping at a deserted town. Meanwhile, Nichole goes to Mexico in an attempt to save her husband but is arrested by local police. She is visited by Cardoza, who is revealed to be a corrupt FBI agent. They make contact with Duffy and fly to his location in a Black Hawk helicopter, where Lobo and his sicarios dressed as Federal Judicial Police officers are waiting.

Cardoza takes Nichole hostage as they arrive at the town, where Lobo and his men attack Duffy and his team. Duffy kills Lobo and wounds Cardoza as he rescues Nichole, who then pilots the helicopter and flies her husband, the remaining Charlie team, and Dr. Flores out of Mexico. Cardoza is captured and killed by Black Knights sicarios. Dr. Flores later testifies about the conspiracy behind the peacekeeping mission as Duffy is hailed as a hero by the media.

== Characters ==
=== Armored Saint ===
- Joshua "Josh" Duffy: The security contractor; Charlie team leader (Charlie One); former U.S. Army, Eleven Bravo infantry
- Shane Remmick: The agent-in-charge; Alpha team leader (Alpha One)
- Mike Gordon: The Bravo team leader (Bravo One)
- Dr. Gabriella Flores: The regional analyst
- Scott Wolfson: Charlie Two; a former SEAL Team Three
- Jean Francois "Frenchie" Allard: Charlie Three; a former French special operations
- Tony Cruz: Charlie Four; a former U.S. Army Special Forces (Fifth Group)
- Larry "Nascar" Evans: Charlie Five; a former Atlanta SWAT
- Darnell "Squeeze" Brockington: Charlie Six; a former 3rd Battalion, 5th Marines

=== The peacekeeping team ===
- Reinhardt Helm: The deputy director, United Nations Department of Peace Operations
- Michelle LaRue: The Latin America field manager, United Nations High Commissioner for Refugees
- Hector Herrera: The Mexican Deputy Minister of Interior
- Adnan Rodriguez: Herrera's assistant

=== Mexico ===
- Oscar Cardoza: The consultant for Mexican drug cartels; the supervisory special agent in Mexico, Federal Bureau of Investigation
- Rafael "Rafa" Archuleta: The leader, Los Caballeros Negros
- Lobo: The lieutenant, Los Zetas
- El Patron: The leader, Guadalajara Cartel
- El Escopeta: The leader, Sinaloa Cartel

=== Other characters ===
- Nichole Duffy: Josh's wife; a former U.S. Army officer
- Max Henderson: The CEO, Henderson Aviation; a former Apache helicopter pilot, 12th Combat Aviation Brigade
- Elias Khabbaz: The Lebanese presidential candidate, codename Panther
- Rafka Khabbaz: Elias's wife, codename Tabby

== Development ==
Greaney originally wrote Armored as a screenplay in 2011 before shelving it. He later turned it into an audio play for Audible before expanding it into a novel. “There are a lot of positive things about writing an audio book because it gives you a lot of creative tools that you don’t have when writing a book,” he said.

Greaney described the book as "one part Black Hawk Down and one part Apocalypse Now". He was also inspired by taking training classes with high-risk civilian contractors. “These are fascinating people,” he added. “It is a super blue collar job. There is a lot of super patriotism and sheepdog mentality.”

== Reception ==
=== Commercial ===
Armored charted at number 14 at the Mass Market Books category of The New York Times Best Seller list in June 2023.

=== Critical ===
Publishers Weekly praised the book's "explosive action sequences" and its main character Duffy, who "proves to be more than just a hardened military tactician". Kirkus Reviews reviewed the book: "Greaney dumps a ton of trouble on the hero, and there’s never a dull page." Mystery and Suspense Magazine hailed the book for its "constant action, interesting characters, funny moments, and a high body count".

== Film adaptation ==
Armored was optioned by Sony Pictures in 2020 before the audio play release for a future film adaptation to be directed by Michael Bay and produced by Erwin Stoff as of 2022.
