= Sentinel (novel) =

2024 novel by Mark Greaney

- First edition cover
- Author: Mark Greaney
- Audio read by: Adam Gold
- Language: English
- Series: Armored
- Release number: 2
- Genre: Thriller
- Publisher: Berkley Publishing Group
- Publication date: June 25, 2024
- Publication place: United States
- Media type: Print (Hardcover), Audio, eBook
- Pages: 496
- ISBN: 9780593436912
- Preceded by: Armored

Sentinel is an action thriller novel by Mark Greaney, published on June 25, 2024, by Berkley Books. It is the second book in the Armored series featuring high-risk security contractor Josh Duffy, as he finds himself and his wife Nichole in the middle of a coup in Ghana.

== Plot summary ==
After the events of Armored, Joshua Duffy works as a special agent for Diplomatic Security in the U.S. Department of State. His wife Nichole also works in the same department as a political officer. They are assigned to the U.S. embassy in Accra, Ghana, with Duffy as part of the protection detail for ambassador Jennifer Dunnigan. She embarks on a cross-country trip with European Union diplomat Johanna Aldenburg (whom Duffy had been assigned to protect six months ago and had saved her daughter from a violent demonstration in Washington, D.C.) and Ghanaian president Francis Amanor.

Meanwhile, Chinese MSS officer Kang Shikun plots a coup in Ghana as a cover to expand Chinese interests in the nation. He hires South African private military contractor Conrad Tremaine of Sentinel Security Inc. (an iteration of Armored Saint from the previous novel) to train rebel forces led by Professor Mamadou Addo from the neighboring country of Togo in the east and then act as a force multiplier as they attack the Akosombo Dam to the west and the capital of Accra. Kang also enlists a group of Russian mercenaries led by Lev Belov to accompany Tremaine and the rebels as they attack the dam, as well as Nigerian Islamic terrorists led by Iranian Quds Force colonel Hajj Zahedi to storm Accra. Aiming to set up Russia for the coup with Belov's unwitting involvement, Kang reaches out to General Kwame Boatang to eliminate Professor Addo and his men and take over as president once the coup is successful.

The joint US-EU-Ghana delegation leaves from Accra. When bad weather prevents them from proceeding further north, they take a detour to Akosombo Dam for an event. Volta River Authority police officer Isaac Opoku discovers Belov and the rebels disguised as his colleagues preparing for the attack and gets into a gunfight with them, forcing Kang to start the attack at the dam by jamming communications there as Belov forces the dam employees to cut off power to the entire country. With Tremaine on the way, they also find out about the delegation arriving at the dam early, forcing the South African to improvise and assassinate President Amanor.

Duffy recognizes Tremaine as a sniper and prevents the assassination, leading to a gun battle with the rebels as the delegation retreats to the facility building. After rescuing the dam employees, Duffy kills Belov’s men and pursues the Russian as he tries to set up explosives at the dam, introducing himself as having previously worked with Tremaine as a military contractor in Afghanistan. Belov informs Tremaine, who unsuccessfully tries to prevent Duffy from retrieving his tablet computer with evidence of Sentinel’s involvement in the coup. Duffy kills Belov and retrieves the tablet, which he had shot in the process.

Helicopters arrive at the dam to retrieve the delegation, with the first helicopter carrying the Ghanaian president back to Accra. Tremaine shoots down the second helicopter carrying Aldenburg with an RPG, killing its occupants, and the third carrying the ambassador and Nichole, which crashes into a nearby forest. After Duffy links up with Opoku, they go to the crash site, where Duffy reunites with his wife and the survivors, including the ambassador. They evade the rebels and proceed to the U.S. embassy clinic.

In a desperate effort to retrieve the tablet, Tremaine kidnaps Duffy’s children, who had been staying at the embassy’s residential compound. CIA officer Robert Gorski, who had shared his suspicions about the coup with Duffy, pinpoints Kang’s headquarters to a residential area in Aburi Hills. Deducing that Tremaine had taken their children there, Duffy and Nichole infiltrate the area with Isaac as the Ghanaian military invades the area. After Kang escapes, his associate Chen Jia helps rescue Duffy’s children as Nichole retrieves them, while Duffy kills Tremaine after a struggle.

Kang is later arrested in Togo, while Chen cooperates with the CIA, which also obtains information on Sentinel employees from the tablet Duffy had retrieved. President Amanor maintains his position and has General Boatang arrested for treason.

== Characters ==
- Joshua "Josh" Duffy: Special Agent, Bureau of Diplomatic Security, U.S. Department of State
- Nichole Duffy: Foreign Service Officer, U.S. Department of State
- Amanda "Mandy" Duffy: Age 8
- Harry "Huck" Duffy: Age 6
- Javier "Jay" Costa: Regional Security Officer, Bureau of Diplomatic Security, U.S. Department of State
- Chad Larsen: Assistant Regional Security Officer, Bureau of Diplomatic Security, U.S. Department of State
- Benjamin Manu: Foreign Service National Intelligence, U.S. Embassy, Accra, Ghana
- Jennifer Dunnigan: U.S. Ambassador to Ghana
- Robert Gorski: Senior Operations Officer, Central Intelligence Agency
- Richard Mace: Chief of Station, Ghana, Central Intelligence Agency
- Kang Shikun: Senior Operations Officer, People's Republic of China, Ministry of State Security
- Hajj Zahedi: Colonel, Islamic Republic of Iran, Revolutionary Guard Quds Force
- Francis Amanor: President of the Republic of Ghana
- Conrad "Condor" Tremaine: Former South African National Defence Force Lieutenant Colonel, Director of African Operations — Sentinel Security Inc.
- Lev Belov: Former Russian military officer, former Wagner private military contractor, Sentinel mercenary
- Cornelius (Krelis): Sentinel mercenary — Netherlands
- Isaac Opoku: Police officer, River Command — Volta River Authority
- Junior: Sentinel mercenary — South Africa
- Kwame Boatang: General, Ghana Armed Forces (GAF) Central Command
- Professor Mamadou Addo: Leader of the Dragons of Western Togoland Restoration Front (Ghanaian rebel force)
- Johanna Aldenburg: High Representative of the European Union for Foreign Affairs and Security Policy
- Julian Delisle: Director of the high representative's protection detail, European Union
- Chen Jia: Senior Technical Contractor, People's Republic of China, Ministry of State Security

== Development ==
Greaney researched the book by traveling to Ghana. He dedicated Sentinel to his mother-in-law.

== Reception ==
Crime novel review site Criminal Element reviewed the book: "Sentinel is more than just a mere shoot-em-up. The human side of the equation elevates this to more than just a page-turner."
