= Mark Greaney (novelist) =

American novelist (born 1967)

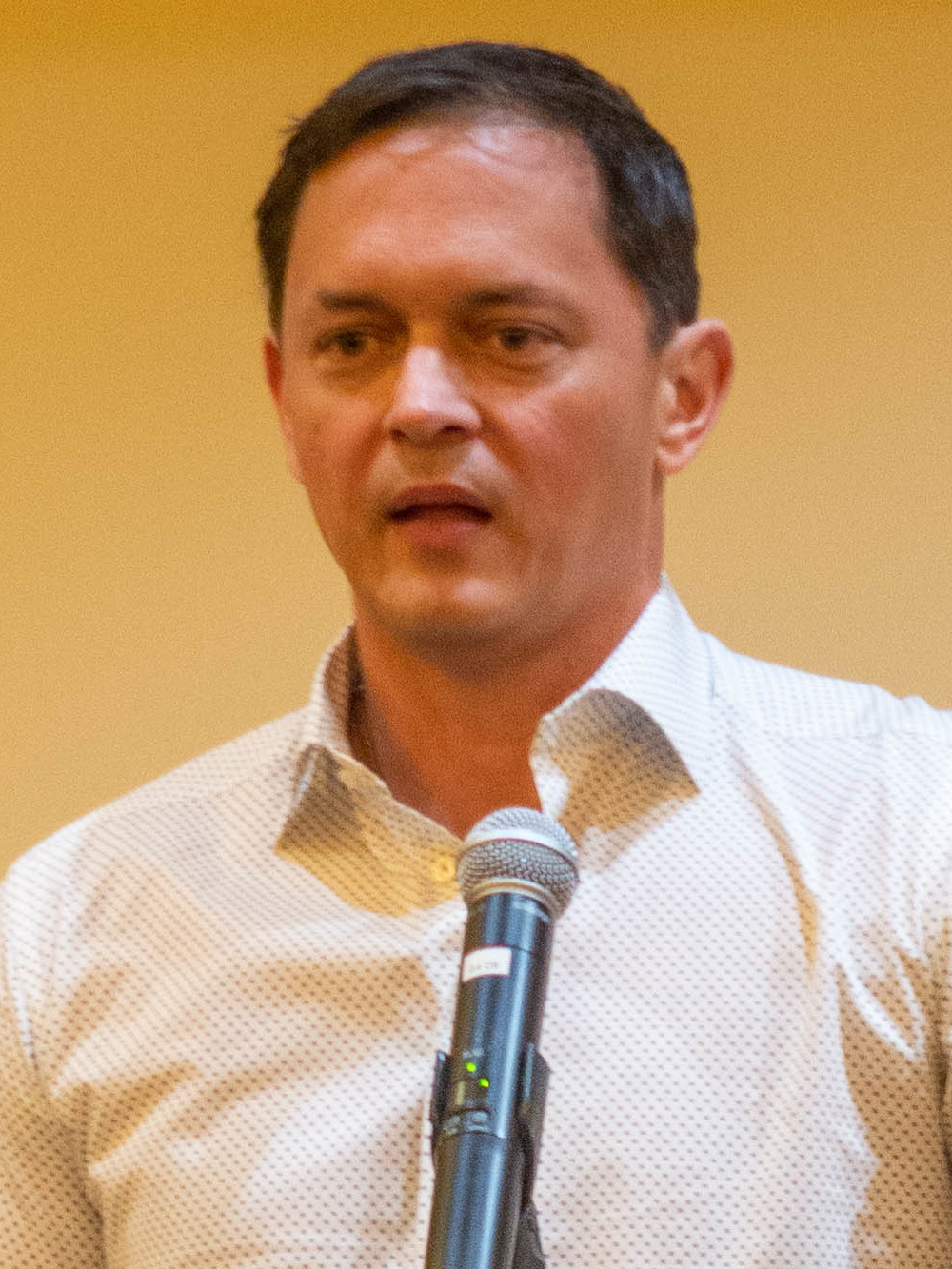
- Greaney in 2020
- Born: Mark Strode Greaney; July 11, 1967 (age 59); Memphis, Tennessee, U.S.
- Occupation: Writer
- Writing career
- Genres: Thriller, war fiction
- Notable works: The Gray Man; Locked On
- Website: markgreaneybooks.com

Mark Greaney (born July 11, 1967) is an American author. He is known for his Gray Man series of action thriller novels, which feature assassin and CIA operative Court Gentry. Greaney is also known for co-authoring Tom Clancy’s final works and for continuing the Ryanverse after his death in 2013 and until 2017.

== Early life and education ==
Born in Memphis, Tennessee, he is the son of Ed Greaney, a presence at WMC-TV Memphis for over 50 years and the namesake for the station's current newsroom. Greaney has degrees in political science and international relations, subjects which became major focuses of his writing career.

== Career ==
=== The Gray Man ===
Greaney previously worked as a waiter and bartender for ten years, then later in a surgical technology company, while working on two novels in his spare time. After finishing one of them, titled Goon Squad and was primarily about the aftermath of the Bosnian civil war, he gave the first 20 pages of his work to his favorite author Ralph Peters's agent, Scott Miller, in a book conference in September 2006. Miller liked the book but later did not go forward with it, saying that "it was unmarketable," according to Greaney. But he urged Greaney to write another one based from a character in Goon Squad named Court Gentry, which would later be The Gray Man. After finishing this novel, Miller agreed to represent him, and later found a publisher, Jove Books.

The national success of The Gray Man made Greaney quit his job in the medical devices company and make the transition to becoming a full-time writer. He was later given a three-book deal by his publisher in 2009. In addition, The Gray Man's success spawned an equally successful series, with 14 more sequels as of 2026.

A film adaptation of The Gray Man was released by Netflix in 2022, directed by Joe and Anthony Russo and starring Ryan Gosling as Gentry and Chris Evans as his antagonist Lloyd. After its success on the streaming platform, a sequel and a spin-off have been announced with the Russo brothers and Gosling reprising their respective roles, with the spin-off to be written by Paul Wernick and Rhett Reese.

=== Working with Tom Clancy ===
Greaney has been a fan of Tom Clancy for years and has read all of his books, beginning with Patriot Games. So when Clancy was looking for a new co-author, Greaney found out that his editor at Berkley Books, Tom Colgan, was also Clancy's editor at G. P. Putnam's Sons. His editor later referred to his agent, who asked Greaney to be Clancy's co-author. Commenting on the experience, Greaney recalled: "I wish I could say I was excited, but the truth is, I was terrified. After I caught my breath, I offered to 'try out' because there were some other authors also in the running." Greaney wrote 25 pages, turned them in, and soon met with Clancy. They collaborated on his last three novels before his death in October 2013: Locked On (2012), Threat Vector (2013), and Command Authority (2013).

After Clancy's death and with the backing of his family and estate, Greaney continued the Jack Ryan character and the Ryanverse, writing four more novels. Regarding the publisher's decision to feature Clancy's name at the top in massive letters and having his name in smaller letters for the covers of the post-Clancy novels, Greaney commented: "It really feels like a humongous honor to do it. I get pretty good billing. The Tom Clancy name is one thing you can put on your book that will make it stand out from across the room."

In 2017, Greaney announced that he will exit the franchise. He was succeeded by author Marc Cameron. Greaney later said of his departure from the Jack Ryan universe:

The truth is that I was afraid I was going to run out of things to do. At that point, I had done six books in five years. I had plenty of macro story ideas. Big, overall ideas. But the micro ideas, you know like, here’s a guy following someone down a street. There’s only so many ways you can tell that and keep it fresh, and I did not want to overstay my welcome in the Clancy universe. So, after six books, my editor sort of talked me into doing a seventh, and I’m really glad I did. I’m glad I wrote True Faith and Allegiance, but when that one was over, I knew it was time.

=== Other works ===
In 2019, Greaney released a war novel titled Red Metal, co-written with Lieutenant Colonel H. Ripley Rawlings IV, which has drawn comparisons to Clancy's novel Red Storm Rising (1986).

In 2021, Greaney released the action thriller Armored as an Audible Original audio drama; it was released in book form the following year. It was optioned by Sony Pictures for a future film adaptation to be directed by Michael Bay and produced by Erwin Stoff as of 2022. Featuring a new character, high-risk military contractor Josh Duffy, it was followed by Sentinel, released in 2024.

== Personal life ==
Greaney continues to reside in Memphis with his wife Allison.

Greaney is known for doing extensive research for his novels, including testing guns, traveling to foreign countries, and doing battlefield medicine.

== Published works ==
=== The Gray Man series ===
- The Gray Man (2009)
- On Target (2010)
- Ballistic (2011)
- Dead Eye (2013)
- Back Blast (2016)
- Gunmetal Gray (2017)
- Agent in Place (2018)
- Mission Critical (2019)
- One Minute Out (2020)
- Relentless (2021)
- Sierra Six (2022)
- Burner (2023)
- The Chaos Agent (2024)
- Midnight Black (2025)
- The Hard Line (2026)
- Dark Union (2027)

=== Jack Ryan series ===
Featuring characters created by Tom Clancy

- Locked On – with Tom Clancy (2011)
- Threat Vector – with Tom Clancy (2012)
- Command Authority – with Tom Clancy (2013)
- Tom Clancy: Support and Defend (2014)
- Tom Clancy: Full Force and Effect (2014)
- Tom Clancy: Commander in Chief (2015)
- Tom Clancy: True Faith and Allegiance (2016)

=== Armored series ===
- Armored (2022)
- Sentinel (2024)

=== Standalone ===
- Red Metal (with Lieutenant Colonel H. Ripley Rawlings IV) (2019)

=== Short stories ===
- "Tower Fall" (with Joshua Hood) - From Audible Original short story collection Pursuit (October 2026)
