= Dead Eye (novel) =

2013 novel by Mark Greaney

- First edition cover
- Author: Mark Greaney
- Audio read by: Jay Snyder
- Language: English
- Series: The Gray Man
- Release number: 4
- Genre: Thriller
- Publisher: Berkley Publishing Group
- Publication date: December 3, 2013
- Publication place: United States
- Media type: Print (paperback)
- Pages: 479
- ISBN: 978-0-425-26905-3
- Preceded by: Ballistic
- Followed by: Back Blast

Dead Eye is an action thriller novel by Mark Greaney, published on December 3, 2013 by Berkley Books. It is the fourth book in the Gray Man series, featuring assassin and former CIA operative Court Gentry. It was preceded by Ballistic and followed by Back Blast. The novel follows Gentry on the run from a fellow assassin connected to his past.

== Plot ==
In Roshchino, Russia, Court Gentry infiltrates the residence of Russian mob boss Gregor Sidorenko, his former handler who wanted him dead after he double crosses him on an operation in Sudan. At the same time, private contractor agency Townsend Government Services has been tracking Gentry on orders from CIA's director of clandestine services Denny Carmichael, who had issued a shoot-on-sight sanction five years ago. After Gentry kills Sidorenko, Townsend House head Leland Babbitt sends assassin Russell "Russ" Whitlock, codenamed Dead Eye, to hunt him down.

Russ tracks down Court to a hotel in Tallinn, Estonia and informs Babbitt, who sends an eight-man strike team. However, Russ reaches out to Court and warns him of the impending assault. They escape the hotel and fight the pursuing strike team, killing seven of them but wounding Russ. After Court treats his wound, Russ partially tells him the truth and also informs him that they were both in the CIA's Autonomous Asset Development Program, a classified training program for singleton operatives. They part ways, as Court goes to Stockholm, Sweden to lie low.

Introducing himself as the Gray Man, Russ makes contact with the Iranian Quds Force in Beirut, Lebanon and offers to assassinate Israeli prime minister Ehud Kalb. Skeptical about his identity, the Quds officer tasks him with assassinating filmmaker Amir Zarini, who has been openly critical of the Iranian government. This prompts Mossad targeting officer Ruth Ettinger to reach out to Carmichael and Babbitt and work together on capturing Gentry, even as she is doubtful about his motive and CIA's reason for targeting him.

Gentry is identified by facial recognition in Stockholm, leading Ettinger and her surveillance team there. Townsend House sends another strike team, which is opposed by Ettinger due to the potential for collateral damage, but Babbitt dismisses her. She later spots Gentry and follows him, keeping Townsend House in the dark. The raid is unsuccessful, and after Ruth sees Court at the Gamla Stan area of Stockholm, she decides to reach out. Meanwhile, Russ assassinates Zarini on a convoy in Nice, France but also ends up killing innocent bystanders. The Quds officer is not convinced of his identity and forces him to provide details about an operation in Kiev, Ukraine three years ago that had become an urban legend associated with the Gray Man. In exchange for information about the Kiev operation, Russ tells Court that Mossad is also hunting for him and that Ruth is one of them. Court forces Ruth to confirm his suspicions and then escapes.

Court calls Russ and confirms his involvement in the Kiev operation, where he singlehandedly stopped an exchange of nuclear secrets from the Russians to the Iranians. Russ informs Quds Force, who assigns him with the Kalb hit. He is then called to Stockholm to meet with the Townsend strike team, who tell him that the surviving strike team member from Tallinn has a different account of the assault. Just then, Gentry is spotted by facial recognition at a bus station. The strike team is deployed there while Russ goes to a nearby train station. Ruth and her team also find out about the Gentry sighting and head there. Russ finds one of her teammates and kills him with a garrote, allowing Court to escape. Distraught, Ruth is ordered by her colleague Yanis Alvey to stand down, but she follows Gentry to the train.

Russ informs Court about the Mossad operative's death, leading him to find out about his plot to frame him for Kalb's assassination. Court later finds Ruth in the train and tells her about Russ. They work together to stop him from killing Kalb, who has an upcoming visit at a cemetery in Brussels, Belgium. Russ also goes there, but finds his passport flagged by Babbitt, who had learned about the plot from Ruth. Carmichael later reinstates Russ's passport, informing Babbitt that they intend to use the prime minister as bait for Russ to kill Gentry and prevent any blowback to the CIA.

Hours after leaving the train at Helsingborg, Court and Ruth are spotted by the Townsend strike team. They escape by stealing a private plane in Travemünde, Germany, landing in Hamburg where they part ways, as Ruth proceeds to Brussels and Court tries to buy a weapon in the St. Georg area. Alvey goes to Hamburg with an Israeli special operations team, where they find the Townsend strike team as they locate Gentry at St. Georg. Court kills two of the Townsend men as Alvey chases him. Gentry accidentally shoots him, but spares his life and flees.

The next day, Babbitt arrives in Brussels and offers Ruth a deal: exchange Court for Russ. After informing Gentry, they devise a plan to track down Townsend's safe house by following its drone that had been following them in the city. Meanwhile, the strike team captures Russ, who suggests that they snatch Ruth as well in order to speed up the exchange. Gentry finds Townsend's drone and forces its operators to track down the safehouse. Russ suddenly breaks free and kills Ruth, escaping after using Babbitt as a human shield.

Gentry catches up to Babbitt's convoy as they flee the safe house, killing most of the strike team. He locates a sniper's nest near the cemetery, forcing Russ to confront him. They fall into a frozen pond and fight for their lives. After seemingly drowning, Gentry picks up a nearby weapon and shoots Russ dead. After the events in Brussels, Carmichael distances himself from Babbitt. Alvey thanks Gentry for saving his life and offers him a chance to enter the United States and clear his name.

== Development ==
As in his previous novels, Greaney did a lot of extensive research for Dead Eye by traveling to Europe. Having collaborated with Tom Clancy on his final three books, Greaney was able to interview law enforcement and security officers. He added: "I met a lot of people who brag about how they never read books...novels. But when they hear the name Tom Clancy, they want to help. They're fascinated that someone like me is interested in a specific aspect of what they do. They're not passing classified information to me, obviously, but my meeting with them is a one-stop place for me to get good, open-source material. It's become the most interesting part of the entire writing process for me...the people I've met in the past three years, working with Tom Clancy."

Dead Eye was later released on the same day as Greaney's final collaboration with Clancy, Command Authority, in December 2013.

== Critical reception ==
Publishers Weekly reviewed the book: "The various moves of each of the skilled and ruthless principals play out against a constantly shifting background of changing goals and allegiances. Fans of superhuman antiheroes will hope the Gray Man survives to fight another day."
