= Agent in Place =

2018 novel by Mark Greaney

- First edition cover
- Author: Mark Greaney
- Audio read by: Jay Snyder
- Language: English
- Series: The Gray Man
- Release number: 7
- Genre: Thriller
- Publisher: Berkley Publishing Group
- Publication date: February 20, 2018
- Publication place: United States
- Media type: Print (hardback & paperback)
- Pages: 507
- ISBN: 978-0-451-48890-9
- Preceded by: Gunmetal Gray
- Followed by: Mission Critical

Agent in Place is an action thriller novel by Mark Greaney, published on February 20, 2018 by Berkley Books. It is the seventh book in the Gray Man series, featuring assassin and CIA operative Court Gentry. It was preceded by Gunmetal Gray and followed by Mission Critical. The novel places Gentry at the forefront of the civil war in Syria, as he helps a group of expatriates take down the Syrian president's brutal regime.

The book debuted at number seven at the New York Times bestseller list.

== Plot ==
Two months after his CIA operation in Hong Kong, Court Gentry is hired by Syrian husband-and-wife doctors Tarek and Rima Halaby through former French intelligence officer Vincent Voland for a contract job in Paris, which is to kidnap Spanish fashion model Bianca Medina, the mistress of Syrian president Ahmed al-Azzam. He extracts her from a private apartment at Rue Tronchet, evading an Islamic State terrorist cell from Belgium sent by Azzam's wife Shakira. After delivering Medina to the Halabys, leaders of a group of Syrian exiles, Gentry angrily leaves them for their faulty intelligence.

The Halabys try to secure Medina's cooperation by asking her about a secret meeting between Azzam and the Supreme Leader of Iran in Tehran in which she was present, which the Halabys believe could lead to the destabilization of Azzam's regime since his Russian allies would strongly oppose a partnership with the Iranians. Bianca reveals that she has a child with Azzam named Jamal, and that she would rather return to war-torn Syria to be with her child rather than betray Azzam. The Halabys reach out to Gentry for another job, which is to extract the four-month-old Jamal and his babysitter Yasmin from Damascus. Court initially refuses, but after rescuing the Halabys from being tortured by corrupt French police detectives sent by Swiss fixer and Shakira's right-hand man Sebastian Drexler, he agrees to go to Syria. Drexler is tasked by Azzam with rescuing Medina in France with Mukhabarat operatives led by Malik, although he is a fugitive from Europe and is working for Shakira.

Gentry secures a job as a contractor for a German-based private military company working with the Desert Hawks Brigade, a pro-Azzam militia, which serves as his cover as he enters Syria. He arrives at Latakia and joins a convoy with Mukhabarat officers that survives an ambush by the local Al-Qaeda outfit Al Nusra Front before proceeding to Damascus. From there, Gentry makes contact with Medina, who gives him the location of her residence, where he extracts Jamal and Yasmin amidst gunfire from pursuing Syrian forces. Meanwhile, Drexler finds the location of the safe house where Medina is being kept at La Brosse through French police captain Henri Sauvage. He forces Voland to surrender and let Malik and his men search the house, killing Tarek in the process. Rima manages to let Medina escape and sets fire to the house before Malik kills her. As Drexler and his henchmen flee the burning safe house, Sauvage and Malik find Medina and capture her.

Gentry informs Voland about the successful extraction of Jamal, but the latter tells him about Medina's abduction. Court decides to assassinate Azzam to salvage the failed operation. He leaves Jamal and Yasmin with Syrian doctor Shawkat Saddiqi, a friend of the Halabys, and maintains his cover as a mercenary. While clearing a ruined refinery with his fellow contractors, Gentry gathers information about Azzam's upcoming trip to a Russian military base in Palmyra. Court tries to alert the nearby enemy to his team's presence as a diversion so that he can inform Voland. However, he is captured by a Special Forces unit in the ensuing firefight. Meanwhile, Drexler, Sauvage, Medina, Malik and his men arrive in Athens, Greece to smuggle themselves back to Syria. As they prepare to board the ship for Damascus, Drexler tries to carry out his plan, which is to kill Medina and fake his death. However, he is shot unconscious by Sauvage, whom he also shoots dead. Voland, who had followed them, rescues Medina, as Drexler is rescued by Mukhabarat operatives waiting at the ship bound for Syria.

After identifying himself to his captors, Court calls CIA's director of clandestine services Matthew Hanley to authorize his assassination of Azzam. After the Syrian president arrives at the Russian military base in Palmyra, Gentry shoots him in the face with a sniper rifle. He and his Syrian interpreter Abdul try to evade the pursuing Russian forces, but are captured by Islamic State fighters. The next day, they are brought to a lake with other prisoners to be executed. When it becomes his turn, Gentry breaks free and kills his executioners, while Abdul and the other prisoners disable their guards. Court and Abdul are rescued by the Special Forces unit, who tell them that Azzam had died from his gunshot wound.

Jamal and Yasmin are extracted to Jordan, where they reunite with Medina. Shakira was forced into exile in Switzerland after her husband's death, accompanied by Drexler. Months later, Voland tracks them down and sends Gentry to assassinate them. He kills Medina and wounds Drexler, who escapes. Afterwards, Gentry returns to the CIA for his next operation.

== Development ==
The book had a working title of Weaponized, and was originally centered on Court Gentry trying to stop the transport of sarin gas into Syria. But Greaney said: “That was already going on, and I just felt like by the time this book comes out, the Syrian government gassing their people was going to have been going on for years. Once I changed that, ‘Weaponized’ no longer meant anything to the story.” The title Agent in Place was suggested by his editor Tom Colgan, who thought fit the story, since the term refers to an operative who has penetrated into an intelligence target, which is Gentry’s role in the novel.

The author researched for the novel on location in Paris and did some research on the Syrian Civil War. Greaney pointed out that Agent in Place is different from previous Gray Man novels: “Court’s motivations are different this time out. He has new allies and new enemies, and you’ll meet some new characters you can expect to see in later installments.” He furthermore stated, “It’s a spy novel and an action novel, but at its core, it’s a story about valor and vengeance, and the perseverance of the human spirit despite the horrors of war.”

== Reception ==
=== Commercial ===
Agent in Place debuted at number seven at the Combined Print & E-Book Fiction category of the New York Times bestseller list during the week of March 11, 2018, making it Greaney's second top 10 novel in the Gray Man series after Gunmetal Gray. It also charted at number ten at the Hardcover Fiction category of the same list.

=== Critical ===
The book received positive reviews. In a starred review, Publishers Weekly praised it as a "can't miss", citing "Greaney’s steady escalation of the risks that Court faces, and the exceedingly clever ways he tackles them." Kirkus Reviews stated that "Readers of the great Tom Clancy will salivate over this fast-moving and well-plotted yarn, which is part of a consistently appealing series in which each assignment is billed as the most dangerous ever." Thriller novel reviewer The Real Book Spy hailed its main character Court Gentry as "represent[ing] the future of the thriller genre", adding: "Greaney once again develops his character brilliantly as he continues to slowly break away from the pack as the apparent heir to the throne currently held by Brad Thor and Daniel Silva."
