= The Chaos Agent =

2024 novel by Mark Greaney

- First edition cover
- Author: Mark Greaney
- Audio read by: Jay Snyder
- Language: English
- Series: The Gray Man
- Release number: 13
- Genre: Thriller
- Publisher: Berkley Publishing Group
- Publication date: February 20, 2024
- Publication place: United States
- Media type: Print (hardback & paperback)
- Pages: 543
- ISBN: 978-0-593-54814-1
- Preceded by: Burner
- Followed by: Midnight Black

The Chaos Agent is an action thriller novel by Mark Greaney, published on February 20, 2024 by Berkley Books. It is the thirteenth book in the Gray Man series, featuring assassin and former CIA operative Court Gentry. The novel follows Gentry and his partner Zoya Zakharova as they face off against a powerful AI. It debuted at number five on the New York Times bestseller list.

== Plot ==
Four months after the events of Burner, Court Gentry and Zoya Zakharova lay low in Panajachel, Guatemala. Zoya is approached by Russian businessman and family friend Borislava Genrich, who asks her for help with extracting a Russian computer software engineer in Mexico City. Genrich is flagged by an ISR drone nearby, tagging Zoya in the process. Contract killer Scott Kincaid (codename Lancer), who had recently taken part in assassinations of several experts in artificial intelligence and robotics around the world under orders from a mysterious client named Cyrus, is sent to Guatemala but fails to kill Zoya and Court, although he later eliminates Genrich and the engineer in Mexico City.

The CIA assigns senior operations officer Jim Pace to investigate the killings. Accompanied by a Special Activities Center paramilitary operations unit led by Chris Travers, he finds a list with names of the targeted scientists that includes billionaire Anton Hinton, who had survived an assassination attempt in Oxford, England. His chief operating officer Gareth Wren hires former CIA paramilitary officer Zack Hightower (Pace and Gentry's former team leader) as Hinton's new security chief. They go to Hinton's residence and lab in Cuba, where they later survive another assassination attempt from a group of Jamaican convicts.

Learning about the assassinations and recognizing Lancer as a former colleague, Gentry asks his former handler Sir Donald Fitzroy for information. He learns that Kincaid is employed by former MI5 officer Jack Tudor, who had founded a risk management company after Fitzroy retired and had taken over his contracts. Fitzroy arranges a meeting with Tudor at his residence in Tulum, Mexico, with Court and Zoya posing as his bodyguards. They are attacked by lethal autonomous weapons (LAWs) sent by Cyrus, killing Tudor.

Gentry tracks down his former boss Matthew Hanley, now working as CIA deputy chief of station in Bogota, Colombia. He informs him about the events in Mexico while giving him a piece of the circuit board from one of the killer robots Zoya had disabled. Hanley gives the circuit board to Pace, who finds it to be manufactured by a company based in Hong Kong; they had recently shipped some components to Florida and Singapore (where Cyrus had set up an operations center for the killings and eliminated the personnel with killer robots afterwards), with a third shipment to arrive in Cuba. Pace asks Gentry to provide countersurveillance as he acts as overwatch for Travers's team, who examine the shipment at the Havana port and find disassembled parts for killer robots.

Cyrus sends Kincaid to Havana to assassinate Pace with ISR support. Gentry follows him as Travers and his men evade Cuban police officers while leaving the port. Kincaid is captured by Cuban police as Gentry and Pace get away. Zoya captures the ISR drone pilot, who tells them about Cyrus, revealed to be a powerful AI developed by Hinton. The billionaire's plan is to upload the AI into Chinese servers from a Cold War-era Soviet SIGINT headquarters building, while building an army of killer robots to be controlled by Cyrus, who had perceived Hinton's colleagues in the AI industry as a threat and ordered them killed.

Accompanied by three CIA paramilitary ops teams, Pace, Travers, Gentry and Zoya stage a raid on Hinton's lab, battling his killer robots and linking up with Hightower, who had discovered Hinton's plan. Cyrus overrides Hinton's safeguards and attacks the advancing Cuban army, allowing Pace, Travers, and Zoya to corner Hinton in the server room. Pace initially orders Hinton to cancel the upload and instead deliver Cyrus to US servers, but later destroys the server room, deleting Cyrus and disabling all killer robots. Hightower kills Wren after a struggle.

Zoya is captured by Hinton's personal assistant, who is revealed to be a Chinese PLA SSF officer, and is later extradited to Russia. Gentry blames Hinton, who is shot dead by Hightower. He later meets with Hanley in Bogota to work on a plan to rescue Zoya.

== Characters ==
- Courtland "Court" Gentry: aka the Gray Man, aka Violator, aka Sierra Six; a former CIA Special Activities Division paramilitary operations officer; a former CIA Directorate of Operations singleton operator
- Zoya Zakharova: aka Anthem, aka 7379; a former SVR (Russian foreign intelligence) officer
- Zack Hightower: aka Romantic; a former CIA Special Activities Division paramilitary operations officer and team leader
- Matthew Hanley: The CIA deputy chief of station, Bogota, Colombia
- Sir Donald Fitzroy: The former MI5 (British domestic intelligence) officer; former owner of Cheltenham Security Services
- Chris Travers (Victor One): The CIA Special Activities Center paramilitary operations officer and team leader
- Joe "Hash" Takahashi (Victor Two): The CIA Special Activities Center paramilitary operations officer
- Jack Tudor: The owner of Lighthouse Risk Control Ltd.; former MI5 (British domestic intelligence) officer
- Angela Lacy: The CIA senior operations officer
- Anton Hinton: The entrepreneur, software developer, inventor, futurist, owner of Hinton Lab Group
- Gareth Wren: The vice president (operations) for Hinton Lab Group; former warrant officer 1, SAS (Special Air Service)
- Xinyue "Kimmie" Lin: The personal assistant to Anton Hinton, Hinton Lab Group
- Kotana Ishikawa: The doctor of information science, Osaka University, Japan
- Tomer Basch: The lethal autonomous weapons (LAW) and artificial intelligence (AI) expert
- Ju-ah Park: The doctor of electrical and computer engineering, Yonsei University, Korea
- Richard Watt: The director of Defense Innovation Unit, U.S. Department of Defense
- Lars Halverson: The chief technology officer, Massachusetts Automation Endeavors, Inc.
- Dr. Vera Ryder: The artificial intelligence ethicist
- William "Trey" Watkins: The deputy director for operations, CIA
- Carlos Contreras: A Mexican intelligence, surveillance, and reconnaissance (ISR) technician
- Martina Sommer: The former German Federal Police communications specialist

== Development ==
In an interview with KAXE, Greaney explains the book's focus on the tech industry: "You see these mega billionaires with these massive artificial intelligence labs and governments that want to steal their information. And so, I thought there's potential there for something. Also, when you write as many books as I have, there's only so many peer villains you can go up against. So, I'm always looking for something to make the books different and unique."

== Reception ==
=== Commercial ===
The Chaos Agent debuted at number five at the Combined Print and E-Book Fiction category of the New York Times bestseller list for the week of March 10, 2024, making it Greaney's eighth top 10 novel in the Gray Man series. It also debuted at number ten on the Hardcover Fiction category of the same list.

=== Critical ===
Publishers Weekly gave the book a mixed verdict: "The chilling central question of who will win the race to integrate AI and weapons of mass destruction is the best feature of a novel that otherwise reads like subpar Tom Clancy or the hasty novelization of a CGI-heavy streaming series." Kirkus Reviews reviewed the book: "Greaney could dial back the bloodletting a notch and still have an exciting story." Thriller novel reviewer The Real Book Spy praised the book as "lightning-fast and packed full of intense, high-flying action", recommending it to fans of Robert Ludlum, Vince Flynn, and Jack Carr.
