= Mission Critical (novel) =

2019 novel by Mark Greaney

- First edition cover
- Author: Mark Greaney
- Audio read by: Jay Snyder
- Language: English
- Series: The Gray Man
- Release number: 8
- Genre: Thriller
- Publisher: Berkley Publishing Group
- Publication date: February 19, 2019
- Publication place: United States
- Media type: Print (hardback & paperback)
- Pages: 513
- ISBN: 978-0-451-48894-7
- Preceded by: Agent in Place
- Followed by: One Minute Out

Mission Critical is an action thriller novel by Mark Greaney, published on February 19, 2019 by Berkley Books. It is the eighth book in the Gray Man series, featuring assassin and CIA operative Court Gentry. It was preceded by Agent in Place and followed by One Minute Out. The novel follows Gentry as he tracks down a mole inside the CIA and later stops a biological attack on an international conference in Scotland.

It debuted at number five on the New York Times bestseller list.

== Plot ==
After a freelance operation in Syria, Court Gentry is ordered home by his CIA handler Suzanne Brewer. The Agency-owned transport plane he is in makes a stop at Luxembourg to bring aboard an MI6 rendition team carrying a prisoner, a Dutch banker connected to a mole in the Agency. Upon arriving at Ternhill Airbase in England, they are attacked by a group of armed men, who kidnap the prisoner. After unsuccessfully pursuing them, Court is tasked with finding out who ordered the ambush. Brewer accelerates the mole hunt, eventually bringing in contract agent and Court's former black ops team leader Zack Hightower to intimidate the mole and reveal himself in the process.

Meanwhile, former Russian foreign intelligence (SVR) officer and Court's former lover Zoya Zakharova is being turned into a CIA asset at a safe house in Virginia. She is also trained to become part of Poison Apple, a codeword CIA program made up of singleton operatives like Gentry and Hightower. Through Brewer, she finds out the circumstances surrounding the death of her father Feodor Zakharov, a former head of Russian military intelligence, in Dagestan fifteen years ago. Convinced that he is still alive, Zoya escapes from the safe house, dispatching a group of Mexican sicarios attacking it at the same time. She travels to London to find out the truth about her father.

Unbeknownst to Zoya, her father had faked his death to become a deep cover agent for the Russian government under the identity of English businessman David Mars. Bent with revenge for the supposed deaths of his wife and children by the American and British intelligence communities, he plans a biological attack on the upcoming Five Eyes conference in Scotland with the help of North Korean intelligence agent Janice Won, who specializes in biological warfare, and an agent inside the CIA, revealed as executive Marty Wheeler, providing him with classified information. Additionally, he had ordered the attacks on Ternhill and Virginia in order to safeguard his real identity when he finds out that his old GRU file was accessed, later executing the banker.

Zoya and Court meet again while tracking down one of Feodor's associates. They later find out about Mars separately; Zoya reunites with her father, who then abducts her for betraying her country, while Court deduces his plan with help from his former handler Sir Donald Fitzroy. Meanwhile, having identified Wheeler as the mole, Hightower captures him as he tries to escape upon arrival in the UK for the conference. Brewer then orders Court to eliminate Mars as well as his associate Roger Fox, who is actually Artyom Primakov, a made man in the Russian mafia. However, Gentry goes off mission and instead rescues Zoya from a hideout, capturing Won in the process.

Won reveals her part in Mars's impending attack. Zoya escapes once again, determined to kill her own father for inadvertently causing the death of her brother in one of his previous failed attacks. Meanwhile, after pinpointing Mars's staging area for his attack to an abandoned church near the venue of the conference at Loch Ness, Brewer sends a CIA Ground Branch unit as well as Gentry and Hightower to assault the area. While they dispatch Russian mafia soldiers and some former Spetsnaz mercenaries and shoot down a crop-duster carrying the weaponized bacteria meant for the conference, Mars and Fox manage to escape, with Zoya in pursuit.

Undeterred, Mars storms the conference venue with Fox, his remaining mercenaries, and fellow sleeper agents working amongst the building's security, taking the attendees hostage as a diversion to release the rest of the weaponized plague he had kept for himself. Having moved to the venue in anticipation of Mars's next move, Gentry, Hightower, and the surviving Ground Branch operatives, as well as Zoya and Brewer, eventually dispatch Mars's men. Much to the displeasure of Zoya, Court kills her father in the building's subterranean area. Brewer then tries to murder Court in order to salvage her own career when she is shot by Zoya, who is then shot by Court, who mistakes her for one of Mars's henchmen. While the two women survive, Brewer is quietly but sternly warned by her superior Matthew Hanley not to have Court killed next time.

The conference attendees who were in contact with the plague are later issued antibiotics to offset its effects. After meeting with Zoya one last time, Court goes off grid.

== Development ==
About the book's tendency to mirror current news, Greaney states, “Mission Critical is a story that definitely takes a lot of things that are going on with the world — North Korea, Russia, U.S. intelligence circles, leaks, all that sort of stuff. But it’s not, you know, ‘ripped from the headlines.’ It's more like this is the real world going on around us, and what can I create from that that makes it an interesting story?”

== Reception ==
=== Commercial ===
Mission Critical debuted at number five at the Combined Print and E-Book Fiction category of the New York Times bestseller list for the week of March 10, 2019, making it Greaney's third top 10 novel in the Gray Man series. It was also at number seven on the Hardcover Fiction category of the same list.

=== Critical ===
The book received positive reviews. Kirkus Reviews praised it as "good, Clancy-esque entertainment", adding: "May the evildoers of the world have nightmares that Violator becomes a real person." Publishers Weekly stated: "Greaney knows what military action fans want and delivers in spades." In a featured review, prominent literary reviewer The Real Book Spy praised the author, stating: "Mark Greaney continues his dominant run with Mission Critical, his most impressive novel yet and the clear-cut early favorite for best thriller of the year."
