= Back Blast =

2016 novel by Mark Greaney

- First edition cover
- Author: Mark Greaney
- Audio read by: Jay Snyder
- Language: English
- Series: The Gray Man
- Release number: 5
- Genre: Thriller
- Publisher: Berkley Publishing Group
- Publication date: February 16, 2016
- Publication place: United States
- Media type: Print (hardback & paperback)
- Pages: 513
- ISBN: 978-0-425-28279-3
- Preceded by: Dead Eye
- Followed by: Gunmetal Gray

Back Blast is an action thriller novel by Mark Greaney, published on February 16, 2016, by Berkley Books. It is the fifth book in the Gray Man series, featuring assassin and former CIA operative Court Gentry. It was preceded by Dead Eye and followed by Gunmetal Gray. The novel follows Gentry as he seeks answers for the shoot-on-sight sanction by his former CIA employers against him.

== Plot ==
After five years overseas as the Gray Man, Court Gentry goes to Washington, D.C. to seek answers for the shoot-on-sight sanction imposed by the CIA's director of clandestine services Denny Carmichael against him. He robs a meth stash house owned by the Aryan Brotherhood to steal cash and a weapon, which attracts Carmichael's attention as well as Washington Post investigative reporters Andy Shoal and Catherine King.

Carmichael and his deputy Jordan Mayes bring in programs officer Suzanne Brewer and Gentry's former team leader Zack Hightower to a task force dedicated to hunting down Gentry. They also task a Joint Special Operations Command (JSOC) unit instead of the CIA's Special Activities Division (SAD) due to Carmichael's rivalry with its head and Gentry's former boss Matthew Hanley. In addition, Carmichael secretly reaches out to Saudi intelligence's D.C. station chief Murquin "Kaz" al-Kazaz for help with capturing Gentry.

Meanwhile, Townsend Government Services head Leland Babbitt threatens Carmichael with leaking classified information to the United States Congress after Carmichael distances himself from Townsend House following their recent failed attempt to capture Gentry in Europe. (Note: As depicted in Dead Eye) Carmichael brings in Babbitt to the task force, but orders him killed. Gentry watches Babbitt in his house when he is assassinated by Hightower with a sniper rifle. He evades Babbitt's security force but is wounded by Saudi assassins disguised as D.C. police before escaping.

The next night, Gentry visits Hanley at his house. Hanley tells him that Carmichael, the CIA director, and then-chief counsel Max Ohlhauser signed off on the shoot-on-sight because Gentry had killed a non-combatant in his last CIA operation codenamed Back Blast, where he extracted a Mossad deep-penetration agent codenamed Hawthorn in Trieste, Italy who was compromised by Al Qaeda, killing an AQ assassin sent to eliminate him. After thwarting a robbery at a convenience store, Gentry tracks down Ohlhauser, who repeats Hanley's answer while also revealing that the Autonomous Asset Program (AAP), a classified training program Gentry was part of before joining the SAD, is still operational. Gentry is identified through facial recognition by JSOC operatives, allowing Kaz's men to capture him at a Washington Metro station at Dupont Circle. Suspicious of his captors, Gentry fights them off and escapes while Ohlhauser is killed in the crossfire.

A Crime Stoppers tip leads to Gentry's hideout being raided by D.C. police, forcing him to set up camp in an abandoned Civil War-era grain mill outside the capital. He also reads an article written by King about a domestic terrorist targeting CIA personnel, unaware that Carmichael is using her as bait. Gentry tracks down the reporter and discovers Hightower following her. Gentry abducts his former team leader, who tells him about the hunt and admits his involvement in Babbitt's death. They part ways, as Hightower later relays Gentry's concerns about the Saudi proxy force to Hanley.

Gentry next reaches out to King and asks her to confirm details about Operation Back Blast with Mossad officer Yanis Alvey, who had helped him get to the United States but was briefly placed under house arrest afterwards. He also learns that Carmichael told her about his birthplace in Jacksonville, Florida, which he interprets as a threat. He goes to Glen St. Mary, Florida to find his estranged father James, who is interrogated by CIA officers about his son's whereabouts. He sees Gentry and warns him to stay away. After finding out that his father's interrogators are AAP trainees, Gentry decides to infiltrate their training grounds at Harvey Point in North Carolina.

Meanwhile, Shoal finds evidence of the Saudi proxy force being involved in Ohlhauser's death, which is intercepted by Mayes. He confronts Carmichael, who admits to his secret pact with Kaz as Shoal is later assassinated by the Saudis. Fearful for his life, Mayes meets with Brewer and tells her about the Saudis as well as Operation Back Blast, intending to inform the Justice Department. They are attacked by the Saudi assassins. Brewer crashes her car, killing Mayes, and blackmails Carmichael into calling off Kaz's men.

Arriving in Harvey Point, Gentry finds his old AAP training ground empty and abandoned. He receives a call from King, who had met with Alvey in Tel Aviv and reveals that he had mistakenly killed Hawthorn in Trieste. Distraught over his failure, Gentry is then visited by Hightower, who informs him that Hanley has assigned them both to hunt down the Saudi proxy force. Heading back to D.C. and using Gentry as bait, they lure the Saudis to a hotel and kill them all. Kaz panics and informs Carmichael, who urges him to go to a CIA safe house in Alexandria, Virginia.

Hanley finds the location of the safe house and relays it to Gentry and Hightower. Gentry decides to storm the safe house on his own, taking Carmichael and Kaz hostage inside. JSOC operatives surround the safe house, bypassing the FBI's Hostage Rescue Team. King later asks Gentry to let herself in and reveals more details about Operation Back Blast, which she had learned from Brewer. Carmichael had ordered Gentry to rescue the Al Qaeda assassin, revealed to be Kaz, Saudi Arabia's own deep-penetration agent in the organization. A year later, Kaz sent a photo of Gentry with Hawthorn's dead body through back channels to Mossad, forcing Carmichael to sacrifice Gentry. Since then, Kaz has been providing intelligence to Carmichael in a way that would benefit the Saudis.

Just then, the JSOC operatives breach the safehouse. Gentry takes King with him and leaves Carmichael and Kaz with a submachine gun. Carmichael kills Kaz just as the JSOC operatives enter and shoot him dead. Gentry and King proceed to the attic, where he leaves the reporter and escapes by using an experimental ground-to-air retrieval device. He is then rescued by Hightower and his former SAD colleague Chris Travers. Two weeks later, Hanley, now acting director of clandestine services, offers Gentry a contract job in Hong Kong with Brewer as his handler.

== Development ==
Back Blast is Greaney's first Gray Man novel since continuing the Ryanverse franchise following creator Tom Clancy's death in 2013, which also saw the publication of the previous Gray Man book Dead Eye. About Back Blast's focus on main character Court Gentry trying to clear his name, which had been a recurring subplot in the series, Greaney said: "I realized I had teased it long enough. I was a reader long before I became a professional writer, and I always look at everything from a reader’s point of view. I felt that this was the right time, and I wanted to give my fans that pay off." He described the result as a mix of the 1988 film Die Hard and All the President's Men (1976).

== Critical reception ==
Publishers Weekly reviewed the book: "Greaney’s unraveling of the Back Blast mystery is masterly, but it’s the Gray Man’s ability to outthink and outgun the scores of men who are hunting him throughout the streets of Washington, D.C., that will keep readers glued to the pages." Kirkus Reviews gave a mixed verdict: "From time to time the tale feels rather bloated, but readers may not mind as they witness the hero’s unerring aim and semiplausible derring-do," while adding that Tom Clancy fans "will have a blast". Thriller novel reviewer The Real Book Spy praised the book: "If you enjoy spy novels, whether you’re a longtime fan or a newcomer to the series, you won’t be disappointed with this book. Back Blast rocks, and is one of Greaney’s best books to date."
