= List of Hobart and William Smith Colleges alumni =

Hobart and William Smith Colleges are private liberal arts colleges in Geneva, New York. Hobart was known as Geneva Academy from 1784 to 1822 and Geneva College from 1822 to 1852. Geneva Medical College was a department of the college from 1834 to 1871. Following are some of their notable alumni and alumnae.

== Academia ==
- Willis Adcock (1944), professor of electrical and computer engineering at the University of Texas at Austin
- Willard Myron Allen, MD (1926), professor and chairman of the Department of Obstetrics and Gynecology at Washington University School of Medicine
- John D'Agata (1995), M.F. Carpenter Professor of English at the University of Iowa
- William Watts Folwell (1857), first president of the University of Minnesota
- John P. Grotzinger (1979), Fletcher Jones Professor of Geology at California Institute of Technology and chair of the Division of Geological and Planetary Sciences
- Moses Gunn, MD (1846), original faculty member and holder of the first chair of surgery at the University of Michigan Medical School. The Moses Gunn Research Conference is named in his honor.
- Michael Ann Holly (1973), Starr Director of the Research and Academic Program at the Sterling and Francine Clark Art Institute; professor of Art History at the University of Rochester
- Stephen Kuusisto (1978), University Professor of Disability Studies at Syracuse University
- William Latimer (1985), president of Chestnut Hill College
- Elizabeth J. Perry (1969), Henry Rosovsky Professor of Government at Harvard University, director of the Harvard-Yenching Institute, fellow of the American Academy of Arts and Sciences, a corresponding fellow of the British Academy, and recipient of a Guggenheim Fellowship
- Edward Regan (1950), president of Baruch College 2000–2004
- David M. Robinson (1988), Robert H.N. Ho Professor in Asian Studies at Colgate University
- Priscilla Schaffer (1964), Professor of Microbiology and Molecular Genetics at Harvard Medical School and the University of Pennsylvania Medical School
- Theodore Sterling, MD (1848), Eleventh President of Kenyon College
- Gregory J. Vincent (1983), president of Talladega College and former president of Hobart and William Smith Colleges
- Ralph Wyckoff (1916), professor of Microbiology and Physics at the University of Arizona

== Arts and Entertainment ==
- Eric Bloom (1967), singer, songwriter, guitarist, and keyboardist, most recently of Blue Öyster Cult
- Janet Braun-Reinitz (1973), muralist
- Christian Camargo (Minnick) (1992), actor, various movies and series, including Dexter, Fast, Inc., All My Sons (Broadway)
- Arthur Dove, early American modernist often considered the first American abstract painter
- Brad Falchuk (1993), television writer, director, and producer best known for American Horror Story and Glee
- Alan Kalter (1964), actor, announcer of the Late Show with David Letterman
- Christopher McDonald (1977), movie, television, and stage actor (Happy Gilmore, Requiem for a Dream, The Perfect Storm, Quiz Show)
- Greg Mullavey (1955), actor (Mary Hartman, Mary Hartman, The Rockford Files, Hawaii Five-O, iCarly)
- Mark Neveldine (1995), screenwriter and director of films such as Gamer and Crank
- Leslie Peirez (1992), television producer
- Gerrit Smith (1876), composer, organist, and educator
- John Trivers (1969), songwriter and bassist with Blue Öyster Cult
- Jonas Wood (1999), contemporary artist
- Brock Yates (1955), screenwriter of the film The Cannonball Run

== Business ==
- Abigail Johnson (1984), CEO and president of Fidelity Investments
- Reynold Levy (1966), former president of Lincoln Center for the Performing Arts and formerly of Robin Hood Foundation
- Warren Littlefield (1974), head of programming for Sony Pictures Television, former president of NBC Entertainment
- Dan Rosensweig (1983), business executive; president, and chief executive officer of Chegg
- William "Bill" Scandling (1949), founder of Saga Corporation (sold to Marriott Corporation in 1986)
- Dana Telsey (1984), CEO, Telsey Advisory Group

== Law ==
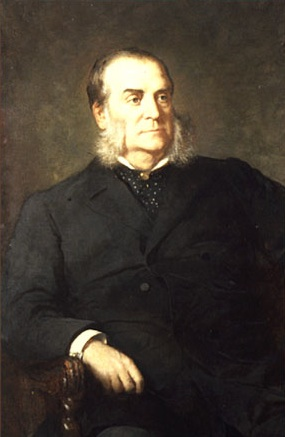
Charles J. Folger

- Jeffrey Amestoy (1968), chief justice of the Vermont Supreme Court and Vermont attorney general; as chief justice, authored the opinion in Baker v. Vermont, 744 A.2d 864 (Vt. 1999), which held that the state's denial of marriage rights to same-sex couples violated the Vermont Constitution
- Harold Baer Jr. (1954), judge of the United States District Court for the Southern District of New York
- Richard Brown (1953), associate justice of the New York Supreme Court, Appellate Division and longest-serving district attorney in New York City
- Charles J. Folger (1836), chief judge of the New York Court of Appeals
- Ward Hunt, associate justice of the Supreme Court of the United States
- Herbert J. Stern (1958), judge of the United States District Court for the District of New Jersey and United States attorney who prosecuted Malcolm X's killers
- John Paul Wiese (1962), judge of the United States Court of Federal Claims
- George Washington Woodward, chief justice of the Supreme Court of Pennsylvania

== Literature and journalism ==
- Byron Andrews (1876), journalist for Chicago Inter Ocean and National Tribune, owner of the National Tribune newspaper and publishing company, and private secretary to President Ulysses S. Grant; received an honorary degree at Hobart in 1900
- Melissa Bank (1982), author of The Girls' Guide to Hunting and Fishing
- Michael Burkard (1968), poet, recipient of the Whiting Award and the Jerome Shestack Poetry Award
- John D'Agata (1995), essayist, author of The Lifespan of a Fact
- Cynthia DeFelice (1973), author
- Thomas Christopher Greene (1993), author
- Evelyn Tooley Hunt (1926), originator of the American style of Haiku; her poem inspired the book The Color Purple by Alice Walker
- Holman W. Jenkins Jr (1982), The Wall Street Journal editorial board member and policy commentator
- Uzma Aslam Khan (1991), author
- Jessica Knoll (2006), novelist, author of best-seller Luckiest Girl Alive
- Stephen Kuusisto (1978), poet
- Eric Lax (1966), author, biographer of Woody Allen and Humphrey Bogart
- Taylor Lorenz (2007), journalist and columnist for The Washington Post
- Hunter "Rip" Rawlings IV (1994), New York Times bestselling author of Red Metal
- Milissa Rehberger (1993), news reporter for MSNBC
- Laura Sydell (1983), digital culture correspondent for NPR
- Ben J. Wattenberg (1955), host of the PBS program Think Tank
- Bill Whitaker (1973), Emmy-winning CBS News correspondent for CBS Evening News and 60 Minutes
- Brock Yates (1955), editor-in-chief of Car and Driver magazine
- Mark Zusman (1976), editor-in-chief of Willamette Week

== Military ==
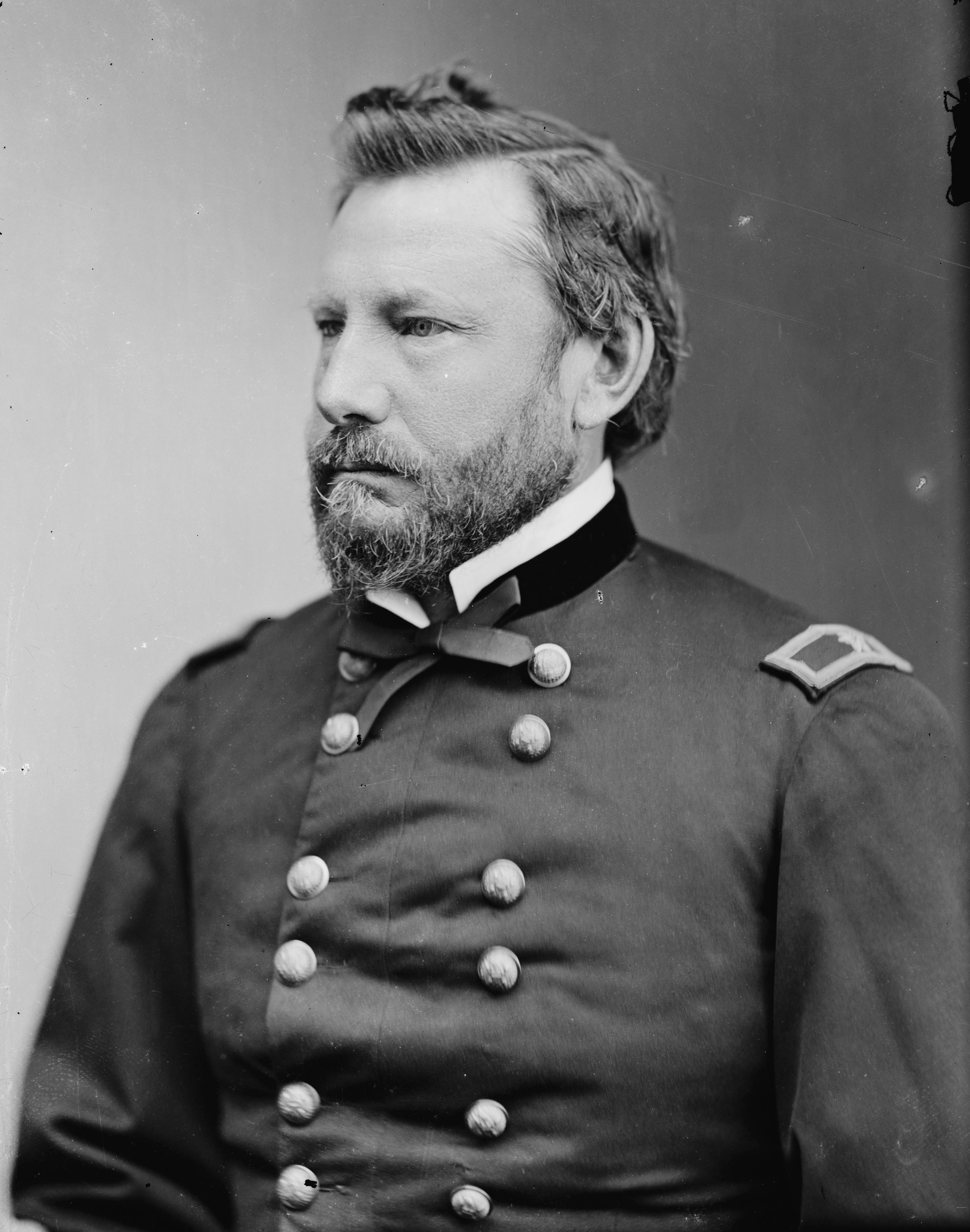
Albert J. Myer

- Edward Stuyvesant Bragg (1848), brigadier general of the Union Army
- DeWitt Clinton Littlejohn, brigadier general of the Union Army
- Frederick S. Lovell (1835), brigadier general of the Union Army
- Robert Mitchell, MD (1845), surgeon of the 10th Wisconsin Infantry Regiment and the 27th Wisconsin Volunteers at the Battle of Perryville, the Battle of Stones River, and the Battle of Jenkins' Ferry
- Albert J. Myer, MD (1847), father of the U.S. Army Signal Corps and a founding member of the International Meteorological Organization

== Politics ==
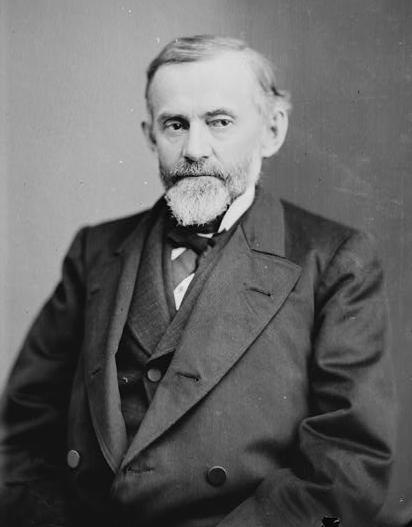
Edward S. Bragg

- Edward Stuyvesant Bragg (1848), United States representative from Wisconsin
- Jeremy Cooney, New York state senator
- James Rood Doolittle (1834), United States senator from Wisconsin
- Peter Myndert Dox (1833); United States representative from Alabama, 1869–1873
- Charles J. Folger (1836), United States secretary of the treasury
- Rodney Frelinghuysen (1969), United States representative for New Jersey
- Henry R. Gibson (1862), United States representative for Tennessee's 2nd congressional district
- Richard R. Kenney (1878), United States senator from Delaware
- Joseph M. Kyrillos (1982), New Jersey state senator
- DeWitt Clinton Littlejohn, United States representative from New York
- Frederick S. Lovell (1835), 11th speaker of the Wisconsin State Assembly
- Alan Lowenthal (1962), United States representative for California's 47th congressional district
- Wanjira Mathai (1994), managing director for Africa and Global Partnerships at the World Resources Institute, named one of the TIME 100 Most Influential People in the World (2023)
- Truman A. Merriman (1861), United States representative for New York's 11th congressional district
- Donald J. Mitchell (1949), United States representative for New York's 31st congressional district
- Robert Mitchell, MD (1845), member of the Wisconsin State Assembly
- Edward Regan (1950), comptroller of New York
- David Rumsey, United States representative from New York
- Horatio Seymour (1823–1825), 18th governor of New York, Democratic candidate for 1868 president
- Ben Wattenberg (1955), speechwriter for Lyndon B. Johnson 1966–1968; adviser to Hubert Humphrey's 1970 Senate race
- George Washington Woodward, United States representative from Pennsylvania

== Religion ==
- Leigh Richmond Brewer (1863), bishop of the Episcopal Diocese of Montana
- Albert Arthur Chambers (1950), seventh bishop of the Episcopal Diocese of Springfield
- Michael B. Curry (1975), first African-American bishop and primate of the Episcopal Church, presided at the wedding of Prince Harry and Meghan Markle
- Thomas Frederick Davies, Sr. (1889), third bishop of the Episcopal Diocese of Michigan 1889–1819
- Isaiah DeGrasse, minister of the Protestant Episcopal Church
- Oliver J. Hart (1913), bishop of the Episcopal Diocese of Pennsylvania
- Arthur Wheelock Moulton (1897), bishop of the Episcopal Diocese of Utah
- George Elden Packard (1966), Episcopal suffragan bishop of the Armed Forces
- William Persell (1965), bishop of the Episcopal Diocese of Chicago
- Robert Rusack (1947), fourth bishop of the Episcopal Diocese of Los Angeles
- Edward R. Welles (1850), third bishop of the Episcopal Diocese of Milwaukee

== Science and medicine ==
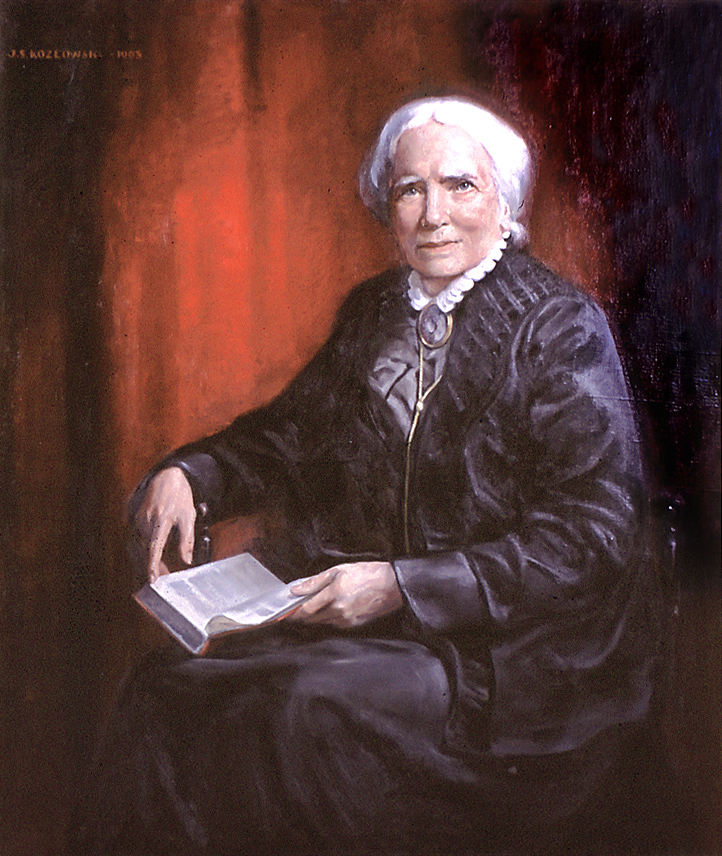
Elizabeth Blackwell

- Willis Adcock (1944), inventor of the silicon transistor, member of the team that developed the atomic bomb
- Willard Myron Allen, MD (1926), co-discoverer of progesterone with George W. Corner; received the first Eli Lilly Award in Biological Chemistry in 1935
- Darrick E. Antell, MD (1973), New York plastic surgeon known for his studies on aging and twins
- Elizabeth Blackwell, MD (1849), first woman awarded a Doctor of Medicine degree in the United States
- Harry Coover (1941), inventor of super glue
- Robert Peter Gale, MD (1966), leukemia and bone marrow disorders expert; coordinated medical relief efforts for victims of the Chernobyl nuclear power accident
- John P. Grotzinger (1979), mission leader and project scientist for NASA's Mars Science Laboratory
- Matt Lamanna (1997), paleontologist responsible for several major discoveries
- Ralph Walter Graystone Wyckoff (1916), pioneer inventor of X-ray crystallography

== Sports ==
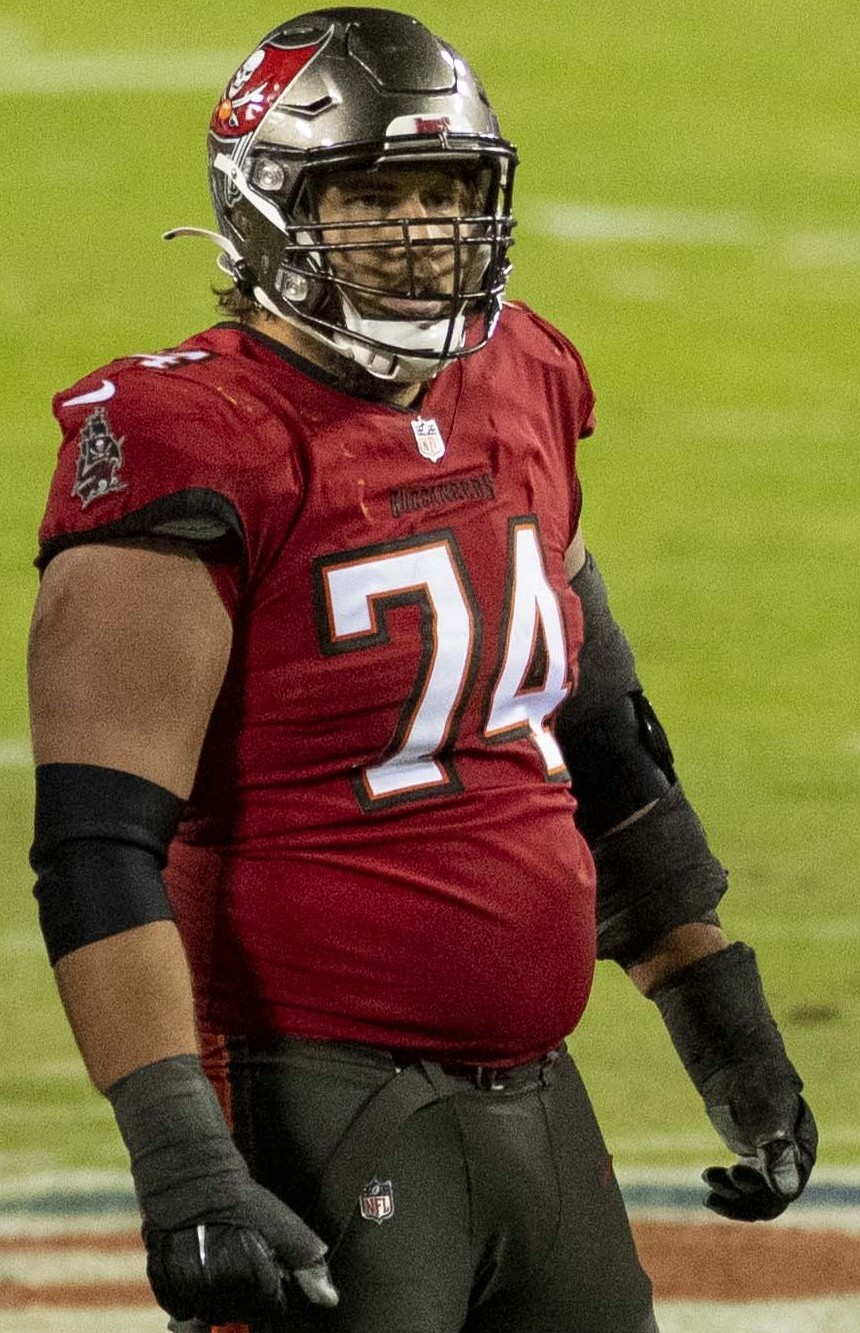
Ali Marpet

- Frank Dwyer (1889), Major League Baseball player
- Jeremy Foley (1974), athletics director at the University of Florida
- Fred King (1937), first Hobart Statesman to play in the NFL
- Ali Marpet (2015), NFL football player, left guard on the Tampa Bay Buccaneers team that won Super Bowl LV, and member of 2022 Pro Bowl Team
- Nate Milne (2003), head football coach, Muhlenberg College
- Pierre McGuire (1983), two-time Stanley Cup winner; hockey commentator for NBC Sports Network
- Kent Smack (1997), 2004 Athens Olympic rower for Team USA
- Jon Wallach (1989), sports broadcaster, WEEI, WBZ-FM (The Toucher and Hardy Show)
