= Buckley Country Day School =

Location
- 2 I.U. Willets Road; Roslyn, New York; United States; 40°46′5.3″N 73°40′40.8″W

Information
- Type: Private Independent Co-Ed
- Motto: Opening The Eyes And Awakening The Mind
- Established: 1923
- Headmaster: Jean-Marc Juhel, Ed.D.
- Faculty: 7:1 ratio
- Grades: Toddler - 8th grade
- Enrollment: approx. 350
- Campus: Suburban, 25 acres (100,000 m^{2})
- Colors: Red and Blue
- Mascot: Bulldog
- Accreditation: NYSAIS
- Yearbook: Scripta
- Affiliation: NAIS
- Website: www.buckleycountryday.com

Buckley Country Day School is an independent, coeducational day school providing elementary and middle education to 336 students in grades pre-nursery through eight in Roslyn, New York, United States. Buckley was founded in 1923 and opened the doors of its first building in Great Neck to a class of twenty-three children. It was begun as a day school but for a period accepted boarding students in the middle grades.

In 1955, as the school's enrollment continued to increase, Buckley moved to its current location in the Village of North Hills in Roslyn. It is operated on a not-for-profit basis by an appointed twenty-two-member Board of Trustees. It is chartered by the Board of Regents of the University of the State of New York. The school is accredited by the New York State Association of Independent Schools and is a member of the National Association of Independent Schools.

== The campus ==
Buckley has a 28-acre (110,000 m^{2}) campus, which includes two classroom buildings, library, three athletic fields, tennis courts, and three playgrounds. The buildings house all the classrooms, two science labs, an art studio, a woodshop, and three gymnasiums. The Hagedorn Library Learning Center contains over 16,000 volumes and is used by students from pre-nursery to eighth grade.

The campus includes four outdoor swimming pools, which are open only in the summer during Buckley Camp and end-of-the-year parties, and a pond.

The campus was developed on the former Lawrence Hobart Shearman estate, and its main mansion "Northcourt" (constructed circa 1918) is still utilized by the school.

== Traditions ==
Buckley maintains a number of traditions. Every 8th grader designs and carves a square foot wooden plaque; these are installed in the hallways of the school and remain displayed on campus forever. These plaques contain the name and graduation year of the individual student; they date to 1927. Both the 8th grade and 3rd grade produce annual plays. Each year the 1st graders perform The Nutcracker ballet. Since 1973, the school has held an annual Fall Fair in October.

=== Athletics ===
Red-Blue Field Day is held annually in the spring. The school's two "red" and "blue" teams compete. This tradition started in 1935 and as of 2024 the Red team is leading 47 to 40. Student records on field day are kept, the oldest being from 1981.

== Pop culture ==
Some scenes in School of Rock, such as those in the cafeteria and the teacher's lounge (The Reception Room, formerly known as Room One), were filmed at Buckley.

== Notable alumni ==
- Marshall Cassidy, class of 1959, horse race official and announcer
- Lyn Coffin, class of 1957, author
- Barbara Cooney, children's author and illustrator, winner of two Caldecott Medals
- Melissa Errico, actress
- Thelma Golden, class of 1980, Director and Chief Curator of the Studio Museum in Harlem
- Julian Lombardi, computer science professor at Duke University
- John McEnroe, former World No. 1 professional tennis player
- Patrick McEnroe, professional tennis player
- Christian McFarlane, professional soccer player
- Leslie Peirez, class of 1984, television producer
- Nicole Petallides, class of 1984, Fox Business Network anchor
- Esther Rantzen, class of 1950, broadcaster
- Gregory Raposo, pop singer, formerly a member of teen boy band Dream Street
- Amber Scott, former child actress (Maggie Banning in Hook)
- Marjory Gengler, class of 1965, professional tennis player
- William Zinsser, class of 1936, writer and historian

== Notable faculty ==
- Roby Young, former captain of the Israel national football team
