= Joy Rose =

American musician

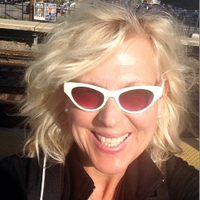
M. Joy Rose

Martha Joy Rose is a musician and the president and founder of Mamapalooza, a company which advocates for the value of motherhood in society. Rose is also executive director of the Motherhood Foundation, a 501c3 non-profit organization. Mamapalooza and the Motherhood Foundation have established the Museum of Motherhood in New York City, which opened in 2011.

She was a songwriter and club singer in the 1980s with two dance charts hits, "In and Out of Love Affairs," and "Sexual Voodoo," and founded the rock band Housewives on Prozac in 1997, which by 2004 had recorded two live albums. She is the mother of Ali Marpet, an American football offensive lineman for the Tampa Bay Buccaneers of the National Football League (NFL).

In 2015 Joy was featured in Peter Freed's Prime Book. The book features images of Christy Turlington and NBC newscaster Natalie Morales among others.

== Early and personal life, and education ==
Rose holds a Masters' in mother studies from CUNY, The Graduate Center and a Bachelor of Fine Arts in theater from Denison University.

She was formerly married to Bill Marpet, an Emmy Award-winning videographer and director who heads B Productions and produces fashion videos in New York.

She is the mother of Ali Marpet, an American football offensive lineman for the Tampa Bay Buccaneers of the National Football League. She has three other children; her son Blaze who was as of 2015 studying for his doctoral degree in ancient Greek philosophy at Northwestern University, her son Brody lived in St. Petersburg, Florida, and her daughter Zena was studying to be a nurse practitioner at Eckerd College. Rose and Bill Marpet are divorced.

== Career ==
In the early 1980s Rose sang on the New York Club scene with songs hitting the Billboard Dance Charts and was an MTV Basement Tapes Winner in 1984 with her video for "In and Out of Love Affairs" which was issued on the Tribeca Records label. The video would later be re-released by Jem/Important Records and receive additional airplay on MTV in 1985. She lived in the Lower Manhattan village of Soho, New York City, where she opened designer Betsey Johnson's first Soho Store.

She was a songwriter and club singer in the 1980s with a dance charts hit, the aforementioned "In and Out of Love Affairs" single on Tribeca Records with composer Michael Gordon, and "Sexual Voodoo," and later founded the rock band Housewives on Prozac in 1997, which by 2004 had recorded two live albums. Also in 1997 she moved to the suburbs. “Live CD” was released in 2003 and the “I Broke My Arm Christmas Shopping at the Mall and Others” CD in 2004.

In 2001, the band's first CD entitled New Prescription Required was released. Rose and her group members were interviewed as “Mom Rockers” on CNN, Fox, and NBC, and in Ladies’ Home Journal, Billboard, USA Today, and The London Times.

She is the founder of Mamapalooza, a music and arts festival in Manhattan, New York. Spin-off festivals have been held in several other cities, including Dallas and Toronto Mamapalooza includes music by "Mom bands" as well as health and arts education, social services for families, kids activities, vendors and women-owned businesses.

She also founded the Museum of Motherhood, a popup museum that focuses on motherhood and the role of the mother.

In 2006, Rose was presented with a key to the city of Seneca Falls. That same year, Rose was appointed to a committee for the Westchester Office for Women and The Women's Hall of Fame in White Plains, New York. Also in 2006 the “Housewives on Prozac’s” release the CD “Mrs. President”. The next year, in 2007, Rose was a featured speaker at the “What Women Want” Expo in Great Falls, Montana, followed by other speaking engagements and conference partnerships with the Women's Media Center in NYC.

In 2009, NOW-NYC recognized Rose's work on behalf of women and girls and bestowed the Susan B. Anthony award to her. The same year, Rose's film The Motherhood Movement—You Say You Want a Revolution was released, sponsored by the Association for Research on Mothering, now renamed MIRCI in partnership with Andrea O'Reilly. Rose also appeared in Kate Perotti's award-winning film Momz Hot Rocks.

In recent years, Rose has blogged about motherhood on the websites of the Women's Media Center and First Wives World, Moms Rising.org, and Working Mother magazine. She is the founder of The Mom Egg has contributed to the Hot Moms Handbook as well.

In 2009, Rose partnered with Telly award-winning producer, director, and editor Catherine Brabec to launch MamaZtv.

Rose is a contributing author to the Encyclopedia of Motherhood, a three-volume reference series published by Sage Publications, and The 21st Century Motherhood Movement edited by Andrea O’Reilly, and the Sociology of the Family, published by Sage Publications (2014). In 2011, Rose's play, entitled Built for Extremes, was selected for the 20th anniversary Writers/Directors Hand to Mouth Players Production, garnering a roving adjudicator award from Tany's. She has been met with educators at Minnesota State University Mankato (2011), Marymount Manhattan College (2011), and Columbia Teachers College (2012). As a result, she pioneered a master's degree level program in mother studies and is currently teaching online through the Museum of Motherhood and at Manhattan College in the Bronx (2015, 2016, 2018). Rose co-edited a collection of academic essays titled Music of Motherhood in 2018. The book was published by Demeter Pres s.
