= Ali Marpet =

American football player (born 1993)

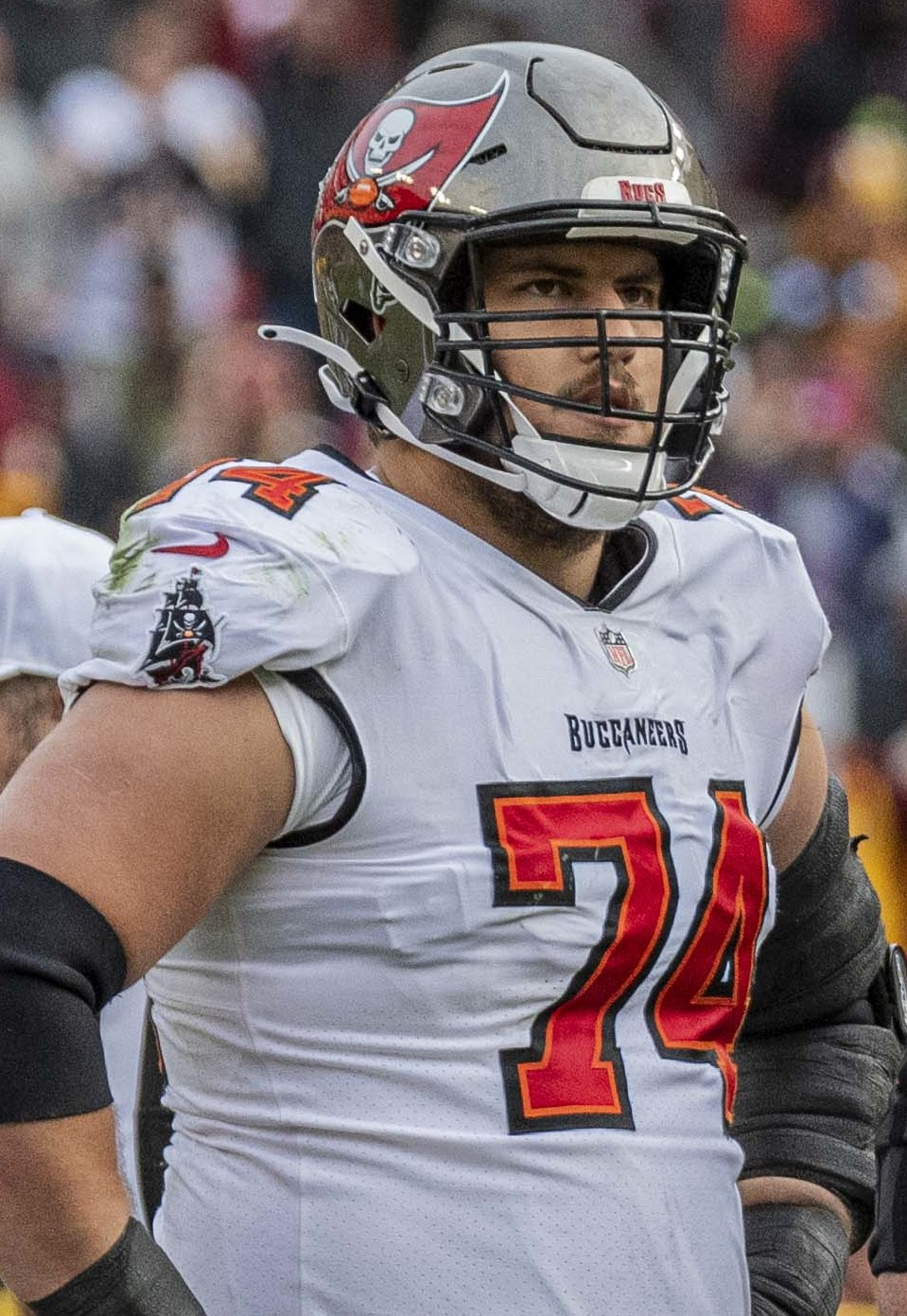
- Marpet with the Tampa Bay Buccaneers in 2021

No. 74
- Position: Guard

Personal information
- Born: April 17, 1993 (age 33); Hastings-on-Hudson, New York, U.S.
- Listed height: 6 ft 4 in (1.93 m)
- Listed weight: 307 lb (139 kg)

Career information
- High school: Hastings
- College: Hobart (2011–2014)
- NFL draft: 2015: 2nd round, 61st overall pick

Career history
- Tampa Bay Buccaneers (2015–2021)

Awards and highlights
- Super Bowl champion (LV); Pro Bowl (2021); PFWA All-Rookie Team (2015); First-team DIII All-American (2014); 3× First-team All-Liberty League (2012–2014)

Career NFL statistics
- Games played: 101
- Games started: 101
- Stats at Pro Football Reference

Alexander "Ali" Marpet (/ˈæli mɑːrˈpɛt/; born April 17, 1993) is an American former professional football player who was a guard for seven seasons with the Tampa Bay Buccaneers of the National Football League (NFL).

Marpet played college football for the Hobart Statesmen, an NCAA Division III program. In 2014, he was a Lindy's preseason All-American first-team, American Football Coaches Association (AFCA) All-American, D3football.com All-America first-team, and Liberty League Co-Offensive Player of the Year.

He attended the 2015 Senior Bowl, as the first NCAA Division III player picked to play in the all-star game in 25 years. Sports Illustrated named Marpet the "biggest riser" at the game, and included him on its All-Offense team. At the Scouting Combine in February 2015, he ran the fastest 40-yard dash among offensive line prospects eligible for the 2015 NFL Draft (4.98), the fastest 10-yard (9.1 m) split (1.74 seconds), and also the second-best time in the three-cone drill (7.33) and 20-yard shuttle (4.47), while scoring the highest "Speed, Power, Agility, Reaction and Quickness" (SPARQ) score. He also performed 30 repetitions at 225 pounds (102 kg) in the bench press, tied for fifth-best among offensive linemen. He also had a vertical leap of greater than 30 inches, and a Wonderlic test intelligence score of over 30.

Drafted in the second round, 61st overall, of the 2015 NFL draft by the Buccaneers, Marpet is the highest-drafted pick in the history of Division III football.

== Early life ==
Marpet grew up in Hastings-on-Hudson, New York. The village is in Westchester County, 20 miles (32 km) northeast of New York City.

His father, Bill Marpet, is a videographer and director and his mother is Joy Rose. She was in a rock band called "Housewives on Prozac," and founded the Mamapalooza music and arts festival and the popup museum Museum of Motherhood. His parents are divorced. He has three siblings.

Marpet, who is Jewish, is an alumnus of Birthright Israel. Marpet joined then-current Jewish National Football League (NFL) offensive linemen Geoff Schwartz, Mitchell Schwartz, Adam Bisnowaty and Gabe Carimi.

At Hastings High School, Marpet played offensive tackle and defensive end for the Yellowjackets, was a three-time varsity letterman, named second-team All-State, earned all-section honors, and was a two-time all-league selection. He played the offensive line as a 160 pounds (73 kg) ninth-grader. Marpet quit playing football after his freshman year to focus on basketball where he earned all-league selection twice. Marpet rejoined the football team in his junior year, by which time he weighed 210 pounds (95 kg). Marpet helped lead the Hastings squad to the section finals in 2010. Hastings lost to Bronxville, the eventual state champions.

== College career ==
Marpet attended Hobart College, subsequent to being sought after to play football by Holy Cross, Fordham University, and Marist College. He graduated with a bachelor's degree in economics and a minor in philosophy and public policy in spring 2015.

Hobart is a small private liberal arts college of 2,271 students in Geneva, in Upstate New York. The school competes in NCAA Division III, which does not award athletic scholarships. Only one other Hobart football player was selected by the NFL before Marpet—in 1937, when halfback Fred King was drafted and ultimately played one game for the NFL's Brooklyn Dodgers.

Marpet was not highly recruited out of high school by larger collegiate programs. He weighed 250 pounds (110 kg) as a freshman, increased his weight to 280 pounds (130 kg) by sophomore year, and 290 pounds (130 kg) by his junior year by eating a 7,000–9,000 calories a day diet. He originally wanted to play both basketball and football in college.

A four-year member of the Hobart football team, he was a three-year starter at left tackle. Marpet started 37 of the 43 games he played, helping the Statesmen win four consecutive Liberty League Championships. Marpet and the Statesmen made four consecutive NCAA Division III Football Championship appearances, advancing to the quarterfinal rounds in 2012 and 2014. During his career, Hobart posted a record of 41–5, losing just one regular-season game.

In 2012, Marpet started all 13 games and was All-Liberty League first-team, and D3football.com All-East second-team. In 2013, he was captain of the football team and Lindy's preseason All-American first-team. He started all 11 games during the season and was All-Liberty League first-team, Liberty League All-Academic, Jewish Sports Review All-American, D3football.com All-East second-team, Eastern College Athletic Conference (ECAC) North All-Star second-team, and won the Tryon Football Award.

In 2014, he was again captain of the team and Lindy's preseason All-American first-team, a Beyond Sports Network (BSN) preseason All-American, and was D3football.com preseason All-American second-team. Marpet started all 13 games at left tackle, did not allow a quarterback sack, and was Liberty League Co-Offensive Player of the Year—the first offensive lineman in league history to be so honored. He was an American Football Coaches Association (AFCA) All-American, a unanimous All-Liberty League first-team, D3football.com All-America first-team, D3football.com All-East first-team, ECAC North first-team All-Star, Jewish Sports Review All-American, and Associated Press Little All-America (top players from Division II, III, and NAIA) second-team. He won the William C. Stiles '43 Memorial Award and the Bill Middleton Memorial Award.

Marpet attended the 2015 Senior Bowl college football all-star game. He was the third Division III player picked to play in the Senior Bowl, following in the footsteps of Ferrum College alumnus Chris Warren and Wheaton College Alumnus Chad Thorson who both played in the all-star contest in 1990. During practice and during the game, he played tackle, guard, and center. He was one of the only linemen who was able to block University of Washington defensive tackle and first round pick Danny Shelton. Sports Illustrated named Marpet the "biggest riser" at the Senior Bowl, and included him on its All-Offense team.

== Professional career ==
=== Pre-draft ===
At the NFL Scouting Combine in February 2015, Marpet's performances identified him as one of the 2015 NFL draft's most athletic offensive linemen. Among offensive linemen, he ran the fastest 40-yard dash, with 4.98, and the fastest 10-yard (9.1 m) split, at 1.71 seconds. He also had the second-best time in both the three-cone drill (7.33) and 20-yard shuttle (4.47). He performed 30 repetitions at 225 pounds (102 kg) in the bench press, tied for fifth-best among offensive linemen. He also had a vertical leap of greater than 30 inches, and a noteworthy intelligence measurement Wonderlic test score of over 30 .

Marpet also scored the highest "Speed, Power, Agility, Reaction and Quickness" (SPARQ) score among all offensive line prospects eligible for the draft. After this superlative combine performance, nearly all NFL teams were interested in drafting Marpet.

WalterFootball.com's mock draft predicted Marpet going 63rd overall to the Seattle Seahawks. Sports Illustrated's second-round mock draft predicted Marpet going 64th overall to the New England Patriots. Sports Illustrated initially rated Marpet as the 89th-rated player among those draft eligible, and 14th among offensive linemen.

Lance Zierlein of NFL.com praised him for his speed and good use of his hands. CBS Sports wrote that Marpet was a "quick thinker with a high football IQ, with NFL toughness and play speed". Fox Sports reported that he had "solid foot quickness and a strong explosion out of his stance."

Pre-draft measurables
Height	Weight	Arm length	Hand span	40-yard dash	10-yard split	20-yard split	20-yard shuttle	Three-cone drill	Vertical jump	Broad jump	Bench press
6 ft 3 7/8 in (1.93 m)	307 lb (139 kg)	33 3/8 in (0.85 m)	10 in (0.25 m)	4.98 s	1.71 s	2.87 s	4.47 s	7.33 s	30.5 in (0.77 m)	9 ft 0 in (2.74 m)	30 reps
All values from NFL Combine

=== 2015–2017 ===
Marpet was drafted in the second round, 61st overall, of the 2015 NFL Draft by the Tampa Bay Buccaneers on May 1, 2015. The Buccaneers traded with the Indianapolis Colts back up four spots to the 61st pick in order to select Marpet, with the Colts also sending the 128th pick of the draft to the Buccaneers, in exchange for Tampa's 65th and 109th picks.

Marpet was the highest-drafted pick in the history of NCAA Division III football. He was the 20th Division III player to be drafted since 1990. Marpet was the first Division III player to be selected in the top 100 players in an NFL draft since 1990, when the Seattle Seahawks chose Ferrum College's running back Chris Warren with the 84th pick. He signed a four-year contract with the team on June 10, 2015.

Marpet began his 2015 rookie season as the Tampa Bay Buccaneers starting right guard, and Pro Football Focus (PFF) graded him as the 12th-best run-blocking guard that season and, in Week 8, graded him as the best in the league, although he missed three games (from Week 10 to Week 12) with an ankle injury. He was named to the PFWA All-Rookie Team. He played 819 snaps on the season, and was graded 77.2 by PFF, which ranked him 31st among 84 qualifying players at the position that year, and was the 10th-best ever recorded by a rookie offensive guard who played at least 500 offensive snaps in their rookie season. PFF ranked him the best at pass blocking efficiency of any rookie guard.

In 2016 he played 1,135 snaps on the season, 2nd-most of all NFL guards, and he was one of only two Tampa Bay offensive linesmen to play every snap. PFF gave him a grade of 84.5, ranking him 13th among NFL guards. His run-blocking grade of 84.4 was 5th-best in the NFL, and he was graded 84.1 in pass blocking.

During 2017, the team moved Marpet to center from his original guard position, replacing previous starting center Joe Hawley. He started 11 games at center before being placed on injured reserve on November 29, 2017, with a knee injury, and played 723 snaps on the season. When he was on the field in 2017, the quarterback was sacked only 4.5 percent of the time on passing plays, as opposed to when he was off the field, when the quarterback was sacked over 9 percent of the time on passing plays.

=== 2018–2021 ===
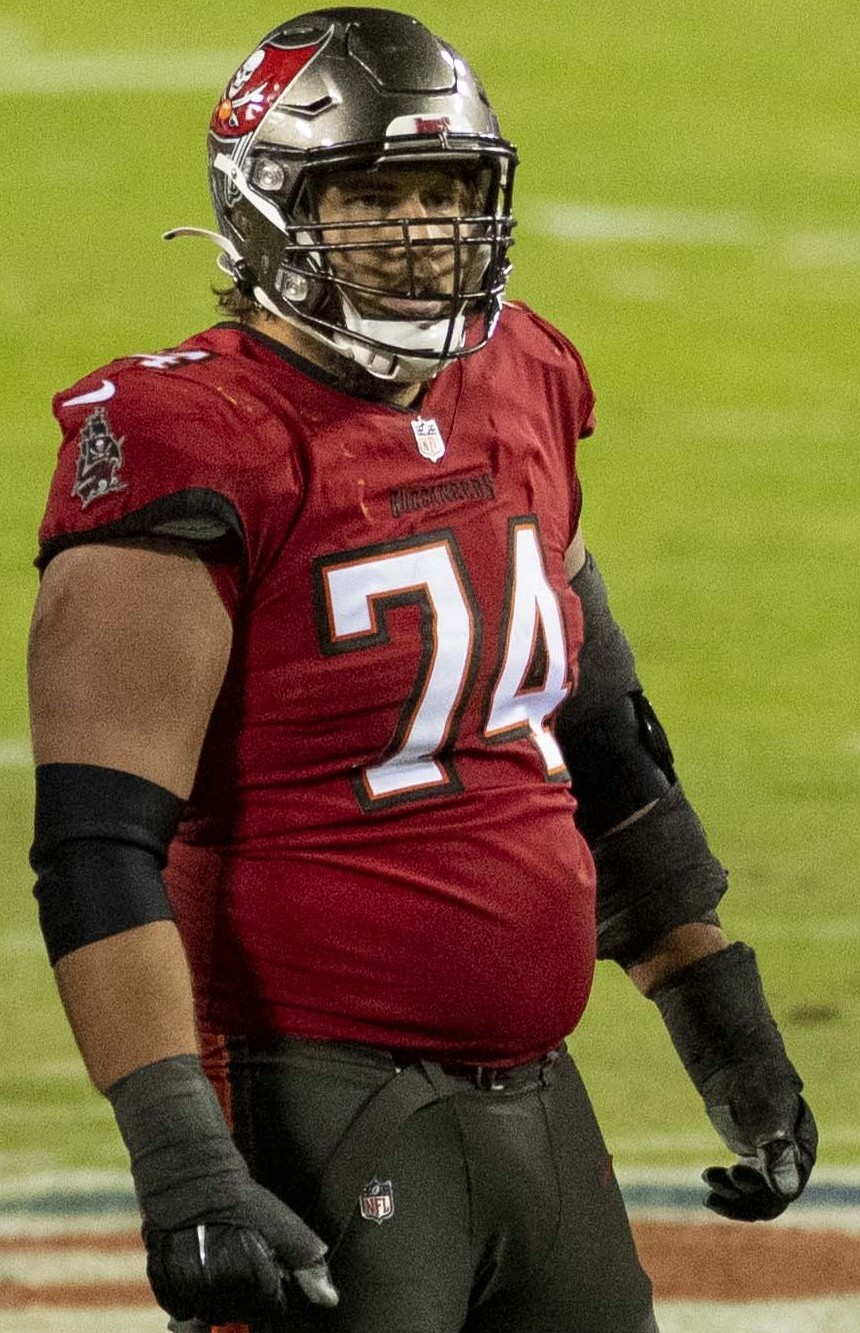
Marpet In 2021

During the 2018 offseason, head coach Dirk Koetter said that Marpet would be moved back to left guard after the team signed former Ravens' starting center Ryan Jensen. In 2018, Marpet was voted a team captain by his fellow players. He played 1,117 snaps in 2018, 4th-most of all NFL guards. He was given a grade of 82.1 for his performance in 2018 by Pro Football Focus.

On October 9, 2018, Marpet signed a five-year, $55.125 million contract extension with the Buccaneers through the 2023 season, with $27.125 million in guarantees. He became the seventh-highest paid guard in the NFL in average salary at $10.825 million per season, and the third-highest at left guard behind the Jaguars' Andrew Norwell ($13.3 million) and the Raiders' Kelechi Osemele ($11.7 million).

He was named to the Pro Football Focus All-Underrated Team entering 2019. Marpet was again voted a team captain in 2019. Marpet played in and started 13 games in the 2020 regular season. Marpet played in all four games in the Buccaneers' playoff run that resulted in the team winning Super Bowl LV. In the 2021 season, Marpet started and played in 16 of the 17 regular season games and both playoff games.

=== Retirement ===
On February 27, 2022, Marpet announced his retirement from professional football at age 28 after seven seasons via an Instagram post. He retired with two years left on his contract, with an annual salary of $10 million. Many former teammates, including Tom Brady, wished Marpet congratulations on his retirement via various social media platforms.

== See also ==
- List of select Jewish football players
