= Evelyn Tooley Hunt =

American poet

Evelyn Tooley Hunt (1904–1997), also known as Tao-Li, was a poet who was famous for writing the poem "Taught Me Purple" which inspired the novel The Color Purple by Alice Walker. She also was one of the first Americans to use the Haiku poem style.

She was born in Hamburg, New York and graduated from William Smith College. In 1961, she came out with her first poetry collection, Look Again, Adam that received the Sidney Lanier Memorial Award of 1963.
