= Willis Adcock =

Canadian-American chemist

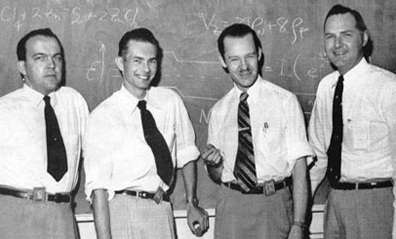
- TI's silicon transistor team, from left to right, W. Adcock, M. Jones, E. Jackson, and J. Thornhill, 1954
- Born: November 25, 1922; Saint-Jean-sur-Richelieu, Quebec, Canada
- Died: December 16, 2003 (aged 81); Austin, Texas
- Occupations: Chemist; Professor; Electrical engineer

Willis Alfred Adcock (November 25, 1922 – December 16, 2003) was a Canadian-American physical chemist, electrical engineer, and university professor who worked on the first atomic bomb and assisted with the invention of the silicon transistor, as well as the integrated circuit. He held several US patents.

== Early life ==
Adcock was born in Saint-Jean-sur-Richelieu, Quebec, Canada on November 25, 1922. He went to grade school in Clarenceville, Quebec. In 1936 he went to live with his uncle in nearby Champlain, New York to attend high school, as Clarenceville did not have a high school at the time.

Under the mentorship of the Champlain High School principal, a Hobart alumnus, he attended Hobart College where he obtained a B.S. in Math and Chemistry in 1944. After graduating Adcock joined the US Army where he became a technical staff member in the Clinton Laboratories in Oak Ridge, Tennessee. While in the Army, he applied for and received United States citizenship and he was a member of the team that developed the atomic bomb. He left the Army in 1948 to pursue his PhD in Physical Chemistry at Brown University.

== Work ==
He had a brief stint as a technical staff member for Stanolind Oil and Gas Company in Tulsa, Oklahoma, later known as Pan American Oil Co., later still a part of Amoco, before becoming manager of development at the Integrated Circuits Department at Texas Instruments, in Dallas, Texas. At Texas Instruments, he grew silicon boules for construction of the first silicon transistor, he later assisted with the development of the first silicon integrated circuits built at TI. Adcock later became the first TI Principal Fellow.

He left Texas Instruments for a year in 1964 to work as technical director for Sperry Semiconductor in Norwalk, Connecticut, but returned to TI in 1965 as manager of advanced planning and technical development. He was later assistant vice president and finally vice president of corporate staff from 1982 until his retirement from TI in 1986.

After retiring from TI, Adcock moved to Austin, Texas and became a professor of electrical and computer engineering at the University of Texas at Austin where he contributed articles to professional journals and developed a novel SEMATECH Research Center of Excellence at the University. Adcock was a fellow of the I.E.E.E. and A.A.A.S., and was a member of the National Academy of Engineering, the American Chemical Society and Sigma XI. He was a Phi Beta Kappa Principal Fellow of the Texas Institute. Adcock was awarded an honorary degree from Hobart College in 1989. He also provided oral commentary for an Electronic Watch exhibit at the Smithsonian Institution.

Adcock was awarded patents for the first electronic photography system (originally filed in 1972, patents 4057830 and 4163256 were awarded in 1976 and 1977). Adcock most recently received a government patent for his Gyroscopic Torque Converter in 2003.

== Personal life ==
Adcock married his college sweetheart, Eleanor Goller (William Smith College class of 1944). They had four children before Eleanor died in 1970. He was remarried to Sara McCoy Whiddon. Adcock died on December 16, 2003, in Austin, Texas.

== See also ==
- List of University of Texas at Austin people
- List of Brown University people
- List of Southern Methodist University people
