= Thomas Christopher Greene =

American novelist

- Born: 1968 (age 57–58); Worcester, Massachusetts, U.S.
- Education: Hobart College (BA); Vermont College of Fine Arts (MFA)
- Occupation: Novelist
- Parent(s): Richard Greene; Dolores Greene

Thomas Christopher Greene (born 1968) is an American novelist and former college president. His sixth novel, The Perfect Liar, was published by St. Martin's Press in January 2019. His fiction has been translated into thirteen languages and has found a worldwide following. He is best known for the international bestseller, The Headmaster's Wife, which both Library Journal and Publishers Weekly called "brilliant."

== Early life and education ==
Greene was born and raised in Worcester, Massachusetts, to Richard and Dolores Greene, the sixth of seven children. He was educated in Worcester public schools and then Suffield Academy in Suffield, Connecticut. He earned his BA in English from Hobart College in Geneva, New York, where he was the Milton Haight Turk Scholar. His MFA in writing is from the former Vermont College. His brother, David, is the current president of Colby College in Waterville, Maine.

== Career ==
Since 1993, Tom has lived and worked in central Vermont. He is the founder and founding president emeritus of Vermont College of Fine Arts (VCFA), a graduate fine-arts college in Montpelier, Vermont, with degrees in visual art, writing, writing for children and young adults, graphic design, music composition, film, writing & publishing, and art & design education.

Prior to founding VCFA, Greene had a long career as a higher education administrator, working as a member of the leadership team at Norwich University, as an admissions and marketing professional, as the director of public affairs for two universities, as a professor of writing and literature, and as the director of a graduate program. He has also worked as an oyster shucker, delivered pizza, on the line in a staple factory, and as a deputy press secretary for a presidential campaign.

== Works ==
- Mirror Lake (Simon & Schuster, 2003)
- I'll Never Be Long Gone (HarperCollins, 2005)
- Envious Moon (HarperCollins, 2007)
- The Headmaster's Wife (Thomas Dunne Books / St. Martin's Press, 2014)
- If I Forget You (Thomas Dunne Books / St. Martin's Press, 2016)
- The Perfect Liar (St. Martin's Press), 2019
- Notes from the Porch: Tiny True Stories to Make You Feel Better about the World (Rootstock Publishing, 2024)
