= John D'Agata =

American writer

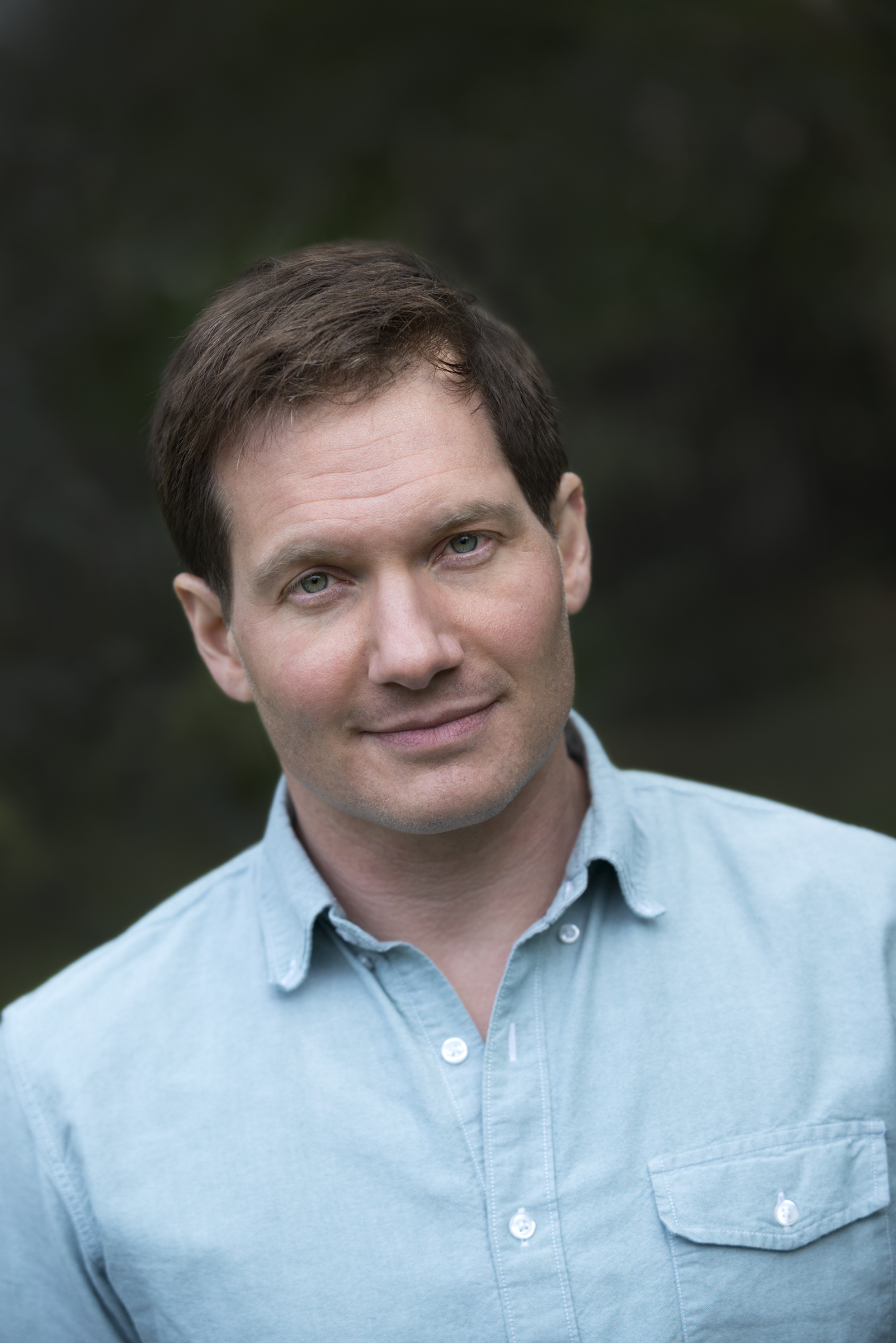
- Born: 1975 (age 50–51); Cape Cod, Massachusetts, U.S.
- Education: Deep Springs College; Hobart College; University of Iowa
- Occupation: Writer
- Writing career
- Genre: essay non-fiction
- Notable works: "The Lost Origins of the Essay", "The Next American Essay", "The Making of the American Essay", The Lifespan of a Fact, "Halls of Fame", and "About a Mountain"
- Website: johndagata.com

John D'Agata (born 1975) is an American essayist. He is the author or editor of six books of nonfiction, including The Next American Essay (2003), The Lost Origins of the Essay (2009) and The Making of the American Essay—all part of the trilogy of essay anthologies called "A New History of the Essay". He also wrote The Lifespan of a Fact, "Halls of Fame", and "About a Mountain".

D'Agata has received fellowships from the Guggenheim Foundation, the National Endowment for the Arts, the Howard Foundation and the Lannan Foundation. He is the M.F. Carpenter Professor of Writing in the Nonfiction Writing Program at the University of Iowa.

== Personal life ==
D'Agata has said that he grew up in an unstable environment and figured out he was gay when he was 12 years old. "And I figured out that I was gay just as AIDS was hitting the mainstream consciousness, so that my sexual awareness was not only a reluctant identification with a thing that my culture was telling me was “wrong,” it was an identification with a thing that was so “wrong” it was apparently going to kill me. So, you know, if you're 10 or 12 years old and God seems to be on a rampage to kill all the faggots, how do you trust your own feelings (how do you trust your gut, your instincts, your very nature) when even Nature itself seems to be telling you that you're mistaken, that you're on the wrong path, that your very heart cannot be trusted. If the feelings in your heart don't go away, what do you do? What do you trust?" After growing up in Boston and on Cape Cod, Massachusetts, D'Agata attended the liberal preparatory school Northfield Mount Hermon on a scholarship. He graduated from Hobart College with a bachelor's degree in classics and English literature.

In 1997 D'Agata moved to Iowa City, where he went on to complete his MFA in poetry at the University of Iowa Writers' Workshop, and then an additional MFA in nonfiction at the University's Nonfiction Writing Program. He subsequently taught writing and research at a number of different schools, including Colgate University, Columbia University, and the California Institute of the Arts in Los Angeles, before returning to the University of Iowa in 2006, where he now directs the Nonfiction Writing Program.

== Professional life ==
D'Agata is the editor of a three-volume series on the history of the essay, A New History of the Essay. It is made up of the volumes The Next American Essay (2003), The Lost Origins of the Essay (2009), and The Making of the American Essay (2016) for which the critic James Wood provided a foreword in which he writes:

For well over a decade now, John D'Agata has been the renovator-in-chief of the American essay. As practitioner and theorist, writer and anthologist, as example and the enabler of examples, D'Agata has refused to yield to the idea of non-fiction as stable, fixed, already formed. . . . Instead, he has pushed the essay to yield more of itself, to find within itself an enactment of its own etymology—an essaying, a trying, a perpetual attempt at something (after the French verb essayer, to try). He has emphasized that the essay should make, and not merely take; that it should gamble with the fictive and not just trade in the real; that it should entertain uncertainty as often as it hosts opinion; that the essay can be as lyrical, as fragmented, as self-interrupting, and as self-conscious as the most experimental fiction or verse.

D'Agata is also the author of Halls of Fame, a collection of experimental nonfiction about which David Foster Wallace wrote, "In nothing else recent is the compresence of shit and light that is America so vividly felt and evoked". He called D'Agata "one of the most significant U.S. writers to emerge in the past few years." About a Mountain is a book-length rumination on the Yucca Mountain nuclear waste repository. The New York Times Book Review called the book "a breathtaking piece of writing" and listed it among the 100 best nonfiction books ever written.

Called by NPR "the most improbably entertaining book ever written," The Lifespan of a Fact is a retrospectively reconstructed and embellished exchange between D'Agata and his one-time fact-checker, Jim Fingal. The book illustrates their heated seven-year battle over a single essay by D'Agata that was ultimately published in The Believer magazine. In the book, D'Agata and Fingal discuss whether it is appropriate to change facts in writing that is both nonfiction and art. In 2018, The Lifespan of a Fact was made into a Broadway, one-act play starring Daniel Radcliffe, Cherry Jones, and Bobby Cannavale.

== Bibliography ==
- Halls of Fame (Graywolf Press, 2001)
- The Next American Essay (Graywolf Press, 2003)
- The Lost Origins of the Essay (Graywolf Press, 2009)
- About a Mountain (W.W. Norton, 2010)
- The Lifespan of a Fact (with Jim Fingal) (W.W. Norton, 2012)
- The Making of the American Essay (Graywolf Press, 2016)
