= George W. Corner =

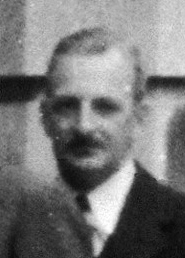
George Washington Corner in 1935

George Washington Corner FRS FRSE (12 December 1889 – 28 September 1981) was an American physician, embryologist and pioneer of the contraceptive pill. He received an outstanding ten honorary degrees from various universities. He played a critical role in the discovery of progesterone. He was described as both a medical historian and a humanist.

He was the person responsible for educating a number of persons important in the world of sexual health, including: William Masters, Mary Calderone and Alan Frank Guttmacher. As such he can be viewed as the grandfather of sexual health and contraception in America. Mary Calderone, in particular, acknowledged a huge debt to Corner in allowing her onto the medical course at Rochester.

His name (along with Willard Myron Allen) attaches to two medical terms: the Corner-Allen Test (for progestation) and the Corner-Allen Unit (a unit of progestational activity in rabbits).

== Life ==
He was born in Baltimore in the United States on 12 December 1889 the son of George Washington Corner II, a local merchant, and his wife, Florence Evans. He attended Baltimore Boys Latin School.

He then attended Johns Hopkins University graduating in 1909 and obtaining a postgraduate degree in medicine in 1913. He taught as an assistant professor at the University of California, Berkeley, 1915–19 and returned to his alma mater as assistant professor, 1919-23. In 1923 he was chosen by University President Benjamin Rush Rhees as the first professor of medicine for the University of Rochester, funded by George Eastman and the Rockefeller Foundation on a salary of $6000 per year. He took up the role in Rochester in 1924, having spent the intervening period since 1923, working in Ernest Starling’s laboratory in England. His title here was director of the anatomy department. In 1940 he moved to the Carnegie Embryological Laboratory in Baltimore, where he worked until 1954.

He was given the Dwight H. Terry Lectureship for 1943-44 for his book Ourselves Unborn.

He served as the 27th president of the American Association of Anatomists from 1946 to 1948.

He was made an Honorary Fellow of the Royal Society of Edinburgh in 1951 and a Fellow of the Royal Society of London in 1955.

He died at his son’s home in Huntsville, Alabama on 28 September 1981. He was a sufficiently respected citizen for his obituary to appear in the New York Times. He is buried in Tioga Point Cemetery in Pennsylvania.

== Family ==
He met Betsy Lyon Copping whilst volunteering at the Grenfell Medical Mission in Battle Harbor, Labrador, and married her in 1915.

== Publications ==
- Anatomical Texts of the Early Middle Ages (1927)
- Anatomy: Clio Medica (1930)
- Ourselves Unborn: An Embryologists Essay on Man (1943)
- Anatomist at Large (1958), his first autobiography
- George Hoyt Whipple and his friends : the life-story of a Nobel prize pathologist (1963)
- A History of the Rockefeller Institute 1901-1953: Origins and Growth (1964)
- The Seven Ages of a Medical Scientist (autobiography) (published 1982)
- Attaining Manhood (aimed at pre-pubescent males)
- Attaining Womanhood (aimed at pre-pubescent females)

== Other Positions of Note ==
- Member, United States National Academy of Sciences
- Member, American Philosophical Society
- Member, American Academy of Arts and Sciences
- Executive Officer of the American Philosophical Society 1960-77
