= The Lifespan of a Fact =

2012 book by John D'Agata and Jim Fingal

- First edition
- Author: John D'Agata, Jim Fingal
- Publisher: W.W. Norton & Company
- Publication date: 2012

The Lifespan of a Fact is a book co-written by John D'Agata and Jim Fingal and published by W.W. Norton & Company in 2012. The book is written in a non-traditional format consisting of D'Agata's 2003 essay "What Happens There" in black text centered on each page with Fingal's black and red comments (and occasional correspondence with D'Agata) making up two columns that surround and note certain portions of the essay.

Readers follow not only the essay as originally written in 2003 by D'Agata, but also the fact checking process in which Fingal and D'Agata engage during the seven-year gap between the original submission of the essay to The Believer in 2005, and the publishing of the book by Norton in 2012. As D'Agata and Fingal discuss the various liberties taken during the composition of the original text, the discourse leads to explorations of the importance of narrative flow in non-fiction and the role of fact checking when writing creatively about true events.

== Content of "What Happens There" ==
D'Agata's 2003 essay "What Happens There" examines the culture of suicide in Las Vegas, Nevada following the 2002 death of sixteen year old Levi Presley. Presley, having died by suicide by jumping off of the Stratosphere Hotel, becomes the core of D'Agata's exploration of Las Vegas' tourist-centered culture. D'Agata relates stories from his personal research, including his experience working for the city's suicide hotline, to highlight Vegas' attitudes towards traditionally high suicide rates.

This essay was originally commissioned in 2003 by Harper's Magazine, but was pulled from publication after the author and editors disagreed about D'Agata's literary approach. D'Agata was then approached by The Believer magazine, which offered to publish the essay. An edited version (fact-checked by Jim Fingal) was published in January 2010 in The Believer.

== Creation of The Lifespan of a Fact ==
After D'Agata's essay was accepted by The Believer, Jim Fingal (a recent Harvard graduate who majored in English) was assigned to fact-check the work. The resulting document ultimately took the form of a book combining the text of the essay and the fact-checking details.

In addition to a discussion of the intentional and unintentional use of inaccuracies in the creation of "What Happens There," the text of The Lifespan of a Fact includes personal opinions from both authors about the importance of facts versus the importance of creative license, and the definition of non-fiction.

The final compilation of essay and comments was edited by Jill Bialosky and published by W.W. Norton & Company in 2012.

== Reception ==
The Lifespan of a Fact received critical attention from multiple publications including NPR, The New York Times, and The Los Angeles Times. It was subsequently named a "Top 10 Most Crucial Book" by the editors of Slate, a "Best Book of the Year" by The Huffington Post, and an Editor's Choice by The New York Times Book Review.

== Broadway production ==
In October 2018, The Lifespan of a Fact was adapted into a Broadway play starring Daniel Radcliffe, Cherry Jones, and Bobby Cannavale. The play was written by Jeremy Kareken & David Murrell and Gordon Farrell, and makes deviations from the text. As part of his research for the role, Radcliffe spent a day working in the fact checking department of The New Yorker.
