= Stephen Kuusisto =

American poet

Stephen Kuusisto is an American poet who is known for his work on depicting disabilities, specifically blindness. He is a professor at Syracuse University, where he teaches poetry and creative non-fiction. He also directs the Interdisciplinary Programs and Outreach Initiative at the university's Burton Blatt Institute.

== Biography ==
=== Early life ===
Stephen Kuusisto was born in March 1955 in Exeter, New Hampshire, where he spent most of his childhood. His father worked as a professor of government at the University of New Hampshire and wanted to study the Cold War, so he moved his family to Helsinki, Finland, from 1958 to 1960. Later in 1963, his father took a job working for New York's governor, Nelson Rockefeller, to improve the state's university system, so the Kuusisto family moved to Albany, New York. He was born three months premature, along with his identical twin brother, who died at one day old. Kuusisto's blindness is a result of a condition called "retinopathy of pre-maturity," where the eyes' retinas do not fully develop in the third trimester of pregnancy. As a result, his retinas were permanently scarred, so he could only "see colors and torn geometries". There were numerous complications because of ROP: nystagmus, also known as, "darting eyes" when the eyes cannot focus, and strabismus or "crossed eyes." At five years old, he underwent multiple eye surgeries to correct his crossed eyes. Kuusisto says that during this recovery "is when [he] learn[ed] to hear," which influenced his 2006 memoir, Eavesdropping: A Memoir of Blindness and Listening. Kuusisto also has a photographic memory.

In rural New Hampshire in the 50s and 60s, he was categorized alongside World War II veterans, as he went unnoticed in society. Additionally, there was no information available during Kuusisto's childhood and adolescence on how to raise blind children. Instead, Kuusisto was taught to "disavow [his blindness]" and attempt to "live like other children" through his kaleidoscope lens. Kuusisto's mother had to "fight with the local district to gain [him] admission to an ordinary first-grade classroom," since it would be "another thirty years before people with disabilities are guaranteed their civil rights in the United States".

=== College and career ===
Stephen Kuusisto graduated from Hobart and William Smith Colleges and the Iowa Writers' Workshop and is also a Fulbright Scholar. He became a dual faculty member at the University of Iowa where he taught creative nonfiction in the English Department and also acted as a public humanities scholar at the university's Carver Institute of Macular Degeneration. For years, he has acted as a speaker on education, diversity, public policy and disability. Kuusisto learned to read Braille at the age of thirty-nine and has produced, and continues to produce professional works of poetry and literature.

In his writing career, Stephen wrote a memoir entitled Planet of the Blind (1998) which jump-started his career, landing his poems and essays in such magazines as Harper's, The New York Times Magazine, Partisan Review and other various anthologies. He also made appearances on The Oprah Winfrey Show, Dateline NBC, and BBC. This memoir catalogs the lifelong struggle of societal acceptance as well as personal acceptance of his blindness. Some of his other works include Only Bread, Only Light (2000), a collection of poems that portray the strangely beautiful world of visual imagery and extraordinary yet delicate language.

Letters to Borges, a collection of poems, was published by Copper Canyon Press in 2013. His third memoir, Have Dog, Will Travel: A Poet's Journey, was published by Simon & Schuster in 2018. He also founded Kaleidoscope Connections LLC with his wife Connie, which helps to raise awareness of disability.

He is currently University Professor at Syracuse University, New York, where he teaches poetry and creative non-fiction. In addition, he directs the Interdisciplinary Programs and Outreach Initiative at the university's Burton Blatt Institute.

== Selected works ==
=== Poetry ===
- Only Bread, Only Light (Copper Canyon Press, 2000)
- Letter To Borges (Copper Canyon Press, 2013)
- Someone Falls Overboard: Talking Through Poems (with Ralph James Savarese) (Nine Mile Art Corporation, 2021)

=== Memoir ===
- Planet of the Blind (Dial Press, 1998)
- Eavesdropping: A Memoir of Blindness and Listening (W. W. Norton, 2006)
- Have Dog, Will Travel: A Poet's Journey (Simon & Schuster, 2018)

== Summary of major works ==
=== Planet of the Blind ===
Planet of the Blind is the first of Kuusisto's two memoirs. It was published in 1998 by Dial Press and quickly became a New York Times "Notable Book of the Year". Planet of the Blind tracks Kuusisto's life from a fervent youth into his adulthood as a poet and writer. As a youth, Kuusisto was willing to climb trees, ride a bike and submit himself to perils that tested his visual impairment. Kuusisto admits that his family was unprepared to deal with his disability. In Planet of the Blind he writes "There are no books about blind children or how to bring them up, no associations of parents or support materials, at least not in rural New Hampshire. Instead there are assumptions: Blindness is a profound misfortune, a calamity really, for ordinary life can't accommodate it." (p. 13) Because of the stigma attached to disability, Kuusisto's parents enrolled him into public school (as opposed to a school for the blind) against the advice of officials. As an adult, Kuusisto traveled, went bird watching, and eventually became a published poet and writer. Of Planet of the Blind, Donna Seaman of Booklist Magazines writes "... as Kuusisto muses on how blindness is perceived by the sighted world and relates his fearsome and wonderful adventures before and after he finally teamed up with a guide dog, his incredible resolve, good humor, and irrepressible love for life remind us of the awesome power of the imagination, and the true meaning of vision."

=== Only Bread, Only Light ===
Only Bread, Only Light is Stephen Kuusisto's debut collection of poetry, published in 2000 by Copper Canyon Press. Kuusisto writes, "I see like a person who looks through a kaleidoscope, my impressions of the world are at once beautiful and largely useless." In Only Bread Only Light, Kuusisto contradicts poetry's traditional reliance on visual imagery and faces readers with multiple levels of rich sensual imagery, particularly sound imagery, to cultivate a new world of poetic "listeners". In Beth L. Virtanen's review of Only Bread Only Light entitled Stephen Kuusisto's Work Delights and Surprises she writes "He speaks unabashedly about being blind, about love, about poetry, about dependence on a dog, about finding beauty in surprising places."

=== Eavesdropping: A Memoir of Blindness and Listening ===
Eavesdropping: A Memoir of Blindness and Listening is Stephen Kuusisto's second memoir to date, published in 2006. Written in the form of linked essays, Kuusisto offers his story of living a life by ear, developing an aural landscape so that he hears "layers of space" rather than sees them—Reed Elsevier of Publishers Weekly contends: "A crowd is not a crowd to him; instead it is a series of sound points, indicating space, pace, rhythm and mood"—and of overhearing the world taking place about him. Eavesdropping becomes an art for Kuusisto, the attentive, active listener and keen observer that he is, and the memoir is composed of countless anecdotes recounting his experiences doing just that. He discusses his childhood and reveals that he was more of a recluse, his constant companion being music—from the rhythm of the wind, to the sound of trees tapping on windows, to the song of birds, to the Victrola he discovers in his grandmother's attic—but particularly the sounds of Enrico Caruso, a famous Italian tenor. Kuusisto also confides that his grandmother was his first "guru of listening". Donna Seaman of Booklist writes of his memoir:

As Kuusisto recounts further seminal moments and improbable adventures, he presents exquisitely rendered soundscapes that capture aspects of the world most of us barely register, from the storm of traffic to the cacophony of our myriad machines to the songs of trees. As he goes "sight-seeing by ear" in places as diverse as Iceland and Venice, and celebrates the music and literature that sustain him, Kuusisto foregrounds the aural realm and evinces great tenacity and trust in his candid tales of life as an acute and contemplative listener in a loud and hectic world.

== Kaleidoscope Connections ==
Kaleidoscope Connections LLC was founded by Stephen Kuusisto and his wife Connie in order to promote disability awareness and to work toward forming stronger ties between those who have disabilities and those who don't. Their foundation works in union with the Americans with Disabilities Act (ADA) to make a move toward providing adequate customer service for disabled people—to bridge the gap between the mere willingness to provide and a certain 'comfort level' in doing so". Kaleidoscope Connections paves the way for a "kaleidoscope of change" by creating opportunities for branching out and sharing experiences with a wide range of people. The program encourages disability awareness through:

- Customized entertainment (i.e. music and comedy)
- Disability Etiquette 101
- Keynotes
- Literary readings and discussions
- Talks and workshops on college campuses
- Workshops: Customer service for people with disabilities
