= Fred King (American football) =

American football player (1912–2003)

Profile
- Position: Halfback

Personal information
- Born: March 4, 1912; New York, New York, U.S.
- Died: January 11, 2003 (aged 90); U.S.

Career information
- College: Hobart

Career history
- Brooklyn Dodgers (1937)
- Stats at Pro Football Reference

Fred James King (March 4, 1912 — January 11, 2003) was a professional football player who played one game in the National Football League (NFL) during the 1937 season as a member of the Brooklyn Dodgers. The Dodgers were a team based in Brooklyn, New York.

In 1987, King became a member of the Hobart College hall of fame.

He was the first Hobart Statesman to play in the NFL, and the last to be drafted until Ali Marpet was drafted in 2015 by the Tampa Bay Buccaneers.

King has two daughters, Freddi-Jean and Donna.
