= Willard Myron Allen =

American gynecologist and co-discoverer of the hormone progesterone

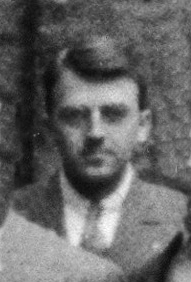
- Willard Myron Allen, 1935
- Born: November 5, 1904; Farmington, New York
- Died: August 15, 1993 (aged 88)
- Education: Hobart and William Smith Colleges; University of Rochester
- Known for: co-discoverer of the hormone progesterone
- Scientific career
- Fields: Medicine; Gynaecology
- Institutions: Washington University in St. Louis; University of Maryland, Baltimore

Willard Myron Allen (November 5, 1904 – August 15, 1993) was an American gynecologist.

== Early life and education ==
Allen was born in 1904 in Farmington, New York, near Rochester, New York.

As an undergraduate student at Hobart College (now Hobart and William Smith Colleges) in Geneva, New York, Allen had studied organic chemistry. This would come in handy for his medical school research that would reserve a special place for him in the annals of medical history. He graduated from Hobart in 1926.

Allen studied medicine at the University of Rochester School of Medicine and Dentistry and supported himself by working as an assistant in his anatomy professor, George W. Corner’s embryology laboratory. Corner and Allen are credited with the discovery of progestin, the original name for progesterone and not to be confused with progestin, a synthetic progestogen, in 1930. He was also credited with the first isolation of progesterone in 1933 (described below and in W.M. Allen "My Life with Progesterone", 2005 below). He graduated with honors in 1932. Allen received the first Eli Lilly Award in Biological Chemistry in 1935.

== Career ==
After several years of teaching at Rochester, Allen was appointed professor and chairman of the Department of Obstetrics and Gynecology at Washington University School of Medicine in St. Louis. He contributed original papers on the histology and physiology of the female reproductive organs, bringing him many national and international awards. He was the first graduate of the Medical School in Rochester to be elected to that university's board of trustees.

When Allen joined Washington University in 1940, he was the youngest chairman of a clinical department. He served as chairman for thirty years until his retirement from Washington University to accept the position of Dean of Admissions at the University of Maryland School of Medicine in Baltimore.

He is credited as a co-discoverer who also named the universal, pregnancy-maintaining hormone progesterone. He was awarded an honorary D.Sc. degree in 1940 for his medical discoveries at the University of Rochester.

The day Allen isolated pure progestin (later named by him progesterone) was a very significant day in his life: "...The isolation of the hormone from the waxy material obtained by high-vacuum distillation was a laborious and exasperating experience. However, the month of May 1933 was a glorious month. On May 5, I had the crystalline corpus luteum hormone. On May 18, my daughter, Lucille, was born. My friends gave me double congratulations and I was sitting on top of the world. ..."
