= Museum of Motherhood =

Museum in St. Petersburg, FL

- Established: 2003
- Director: Martha Joy Rose
- Website: Museum of Motherhood

The Museum of Motherhood, also known as M.O.M or MOM, was conceived in 2003 and first opened to the public on Main St. in Dobbs Ferry, NY with a small exhibition gallery. The focus of the museum is to explore and understand American mothers, fathers, and families. M.O.M. was founded under the non-profit Motherhood Foundation Inc. 501c3, and has participated in events throughout New York state, including a village-wide display called "The Moms of Rock" in Seneca Falls, home of the Suffragette Movement (2010), as well as family activities each year at the Museum Mile Festival in New York City.

In 2011, local Gymboree franchise owners Deb Whitefield and Barry Hanson donated a popup museum space in the Yorkville neighborhood of Manhattan's Upper East Side. It is believed to be the only museum to focus on motherhood and the role of the mother. M.O.M. also features the work of international artists and student-made art. An article in the July 2013 issue of the Wall Street Journal addressed the museum's goals of ascribing value to the role of caregiving.

The museum's founder, Martha Joy Rose, lead singer of Housewives on Prozac also founded the concept of a "Mom Rock Movement" and coined the phrase "Moms Rock" after founding the Mamapalooza Festival. The festival highlights the value of mothers and their talents, and is organized in conjunction with New York Parks Dept. Rose is believed to be the first person to receive a Master's in Mother Studies, graduating CUNY, The Graduate Center in 2015.

Originally scheduled to be open in Upper East Side location through December 2011, the museum remained open on the UES through the summer of 2014. The museum took its exhibits online in 2015 and M.O.M. participated in several international arts presentations including The Art of Motherhood as part of the 2nd annual Jerusalem Biennale for Contemporary Jewish Art at the Hechal Sclomo Museum in Israel.

On June 1, 2016, the Museum of Motherhood relocated to an exhibition and teaching space in the Historic Kenwood Artists Enclave at 538 27th St. N. St. Petersburg, Florida 33713. As of 2025 and after at least one other location in the area, it is a one-room museum in a space in St. Peterburg known as The Factory.
