= Leslie Peirez =

American television producer

Peirez, Leslie
- Occupation: Television producer

Leslie Peirez is an American television producer. She currently works at Verizon Media.

== Productions ==
- The Meredith Vieira Show
- The Million Second Quiz
- The Chew
- The Oprah Winfrey Show, 2008–2011
- Martha, 2005–2008
